= Gustavus Murray =

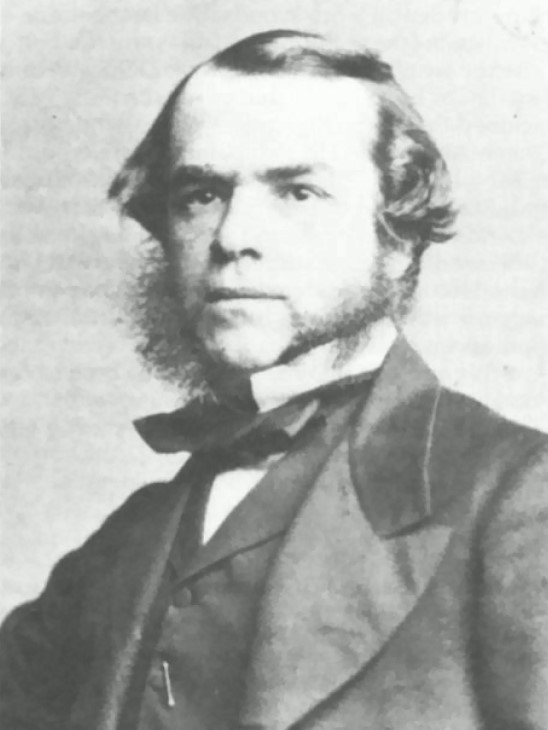
- Born: 1831; Port of Spain, Trinidad
- Died: 7 August 1887 (aged 55–56); London, England
- Education: University of Edinburgh
- Medical career
- Profession: Physician
- Sub-specialties: Obstetrics

Gustavus Charles Philip Murray (1831 – 7 August 1887) was a British obstetrician who may have been the inspiration for Luke Fildes' 1891 painting The Doctor. His work in the examination of pregnant women was recognised by Adolphe Pinard in 1889 but ignored in England. He was popular with his patients and had a thriving practice with many professional appointments but as a result wrote little. He died at the age of 56 years from heart failure.

== Early life and family ==
Gustavus (sometimes Gustavo) Murray was born at Port of Spain, Trinidad, West Indies, in 1831, the youngest son of Edward Murray (c.1800–1874), registrar of slaves and later Marshal of Trinidad. Murray received his schooling mainly at private schools in England. His health was poor and he was twice forced to return to Trinidad for that reason.

He married Fanny Tryphena Yearsley (born Trinidad) at St George's, Hanover Square, in 1856, daughter of John Yearsley of The Moors, Cheltenham. They had six sons and one daughter. In 1861 he was living in Green Street, Mayfair, in central London. In 1871 the family were in the same area but had no servants according to the census return. By 1881 they were living in Great Cumberland Place, Marylebone, and employed four servants. Their second son, Stormont Murray, became a physician who practiced in London.

== Medical career ==
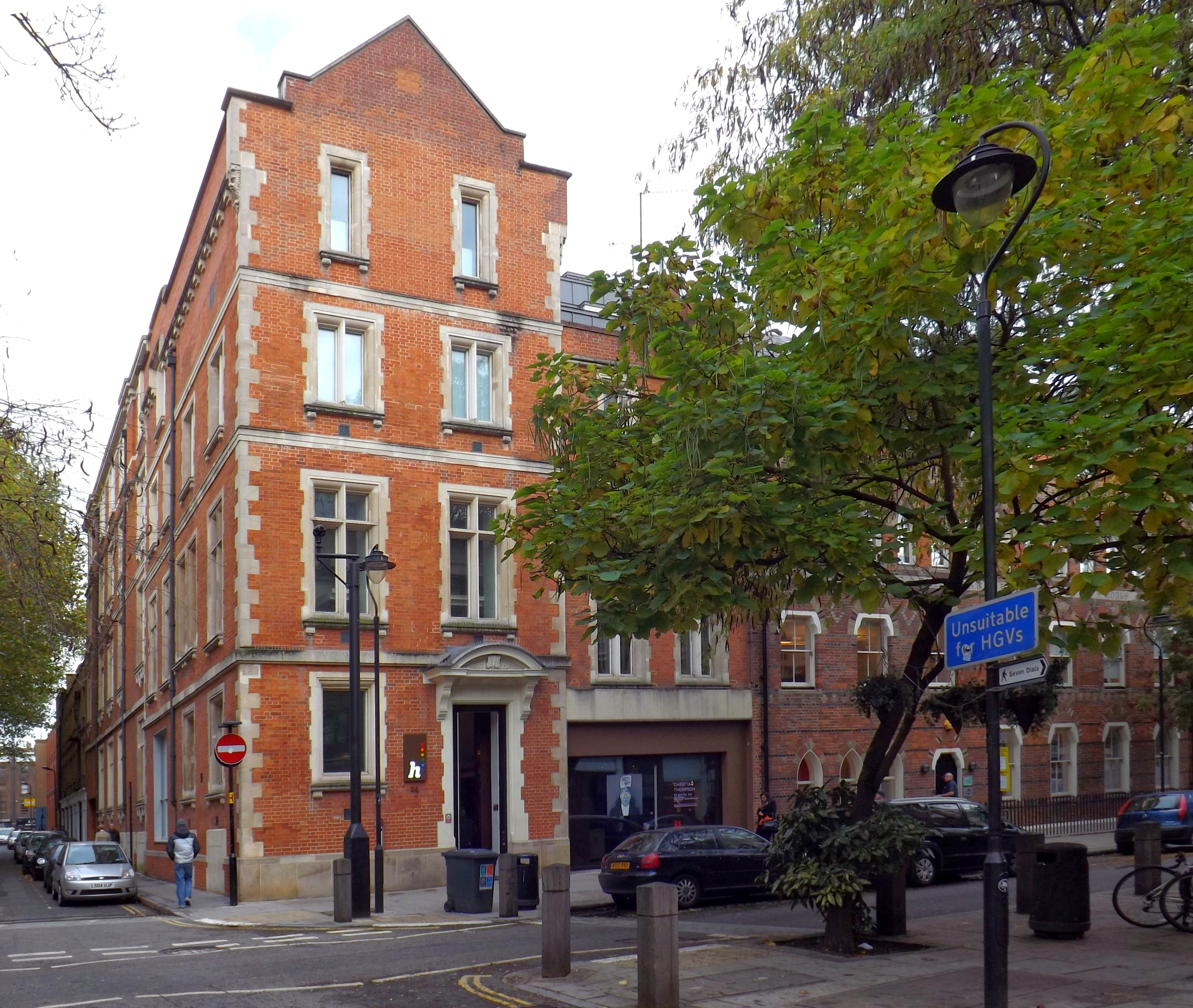
The former British Lying-In Hospital, Endell Street, London.

Murray enrolled in the medical school of King's College, London, when Arthur Farre was professor of obstetrics and became a member of the Royal College of Surgeons in 1856. He studied at the Vienna General Lying-in Hospital where puerperal fever had been tackled by Ignaz Semmelweis. Subsequently, he received his M.D. from the University of Edinburgh in 1860 for a thesis titled "On the Medico-Legal aspect of certain morbid conditions that may be mistaken for pregnancy".

In 1858, Murray claimed, in a paper in The Lancet, to be able to tell the exact parts of a fetus, including each vertebra and the cleft between the buttocks, through feeling the abdomen of the pregnant woman. At the time, these women would have been examined only at labour and to be able to distinguish fetal parts during the antenatal period was felt to be unbelievable. His work was recognised by Adolphe Pinard, an eminent obstetrician and pioneer of listening to the fetal heartbeat, in Pinard's 1889 book on abdominal palpation in pregnancy, but his innovations in the examination of pregnant women were ignored in England.

At the start of his career he had consulting rooms at his home at 17 Green Street, Mayfair, a fashionable location for doctors. He was physician-accoucheur and physician for the diseases of women and children to the St George's and St James's Dispensary. He was physician and later consulting physician-accoucheur to the St Pancras Provident Dispensary and was closely associated with the Establishment for Gentlewomen in Harley Street. He was also obstetric physician to the British Lying-In Hospital in Endell Street, London, where he was a governor, and then to the Great Northern Central Hospital, Caledonian Road, Islington.

He was a fellow of the Edinburgh Obstetrical Society and elected a fellow of the Obstetrical Society of London in 1859. Towards the end of his career he was to become president of the London society but was unable to take up the position due to ill health.

== The Doctor ==
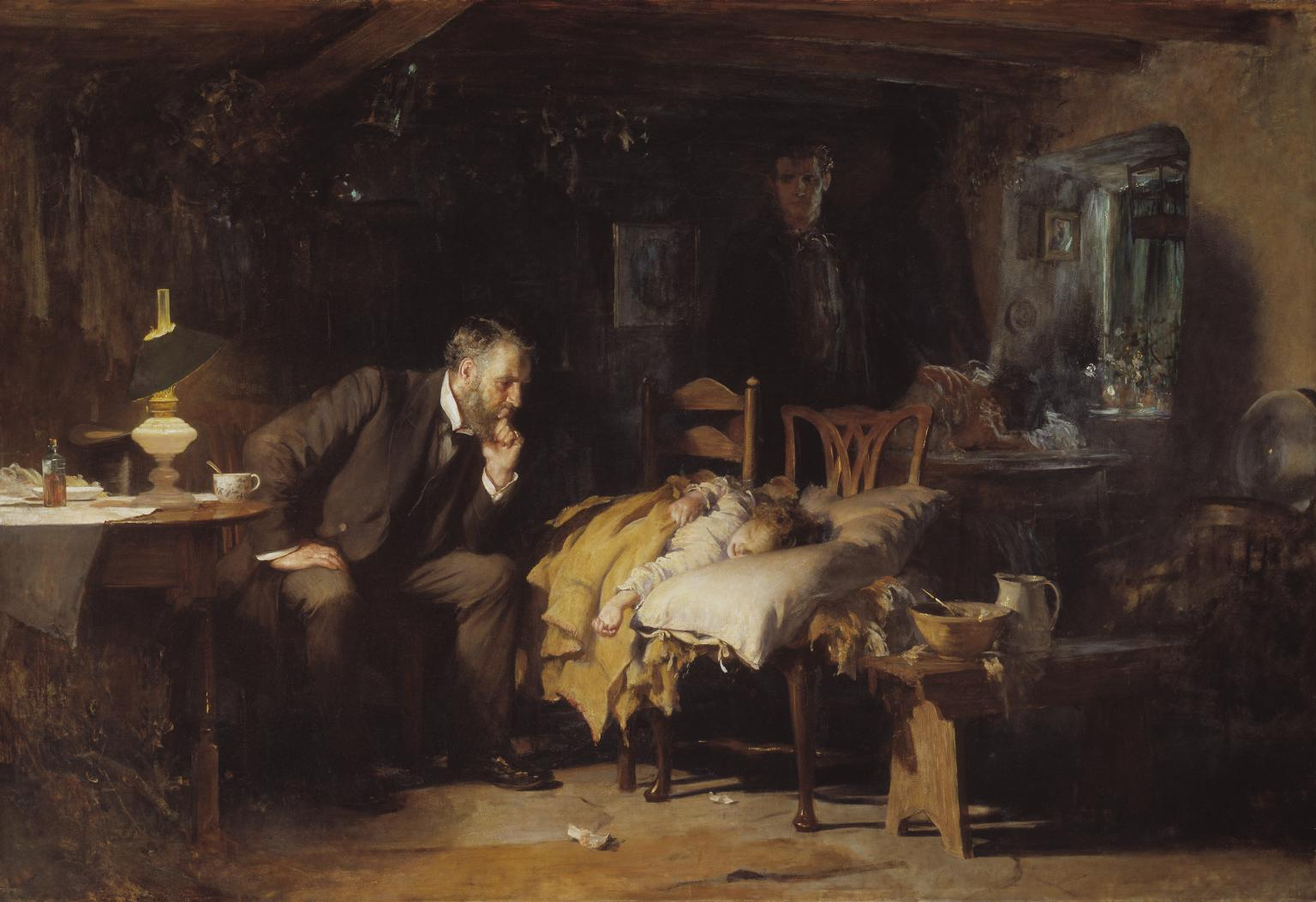
The Doctor, Luke Fildes, 1891. Oil-on-canvas, Tate Gallery, London.

Murray's professional demeanor may have been the inspiration for the attentive and concerned physician in Luke Fildes's painting The Doctor (1891) after he attended the artist's first child, Philip, when he became ill and died at Christmas 1877. Murray and Fildes were well known to each other, and Murray had delivered all the Fildes children. The artist's son, also Luke Fildes, wrote in his biography of his father:

"The character and bearing of their doctor throughout the time of their anxiety, made a deep impression on my parents. Dr Murray became a symbol of professional devotion which would one day inspire the painting of The Doctor." And: "The Doctor had been on my father's mind ever since Dr Murray watched over Philip".

Fildes junior made it clear in his book, however, that the figure in the painting was a composite of several people, including Fildes's friend Dr Thomas Buzzard.

== Death ==
Murray died on 7 August 1887 at 66 Great Cumberland Place, London, after becoming weak with stomach and liver problems. His death has been attributed to heart failure. He left an estate of £4,132.
