= Petrov (Hodonín District) =

- Municipality
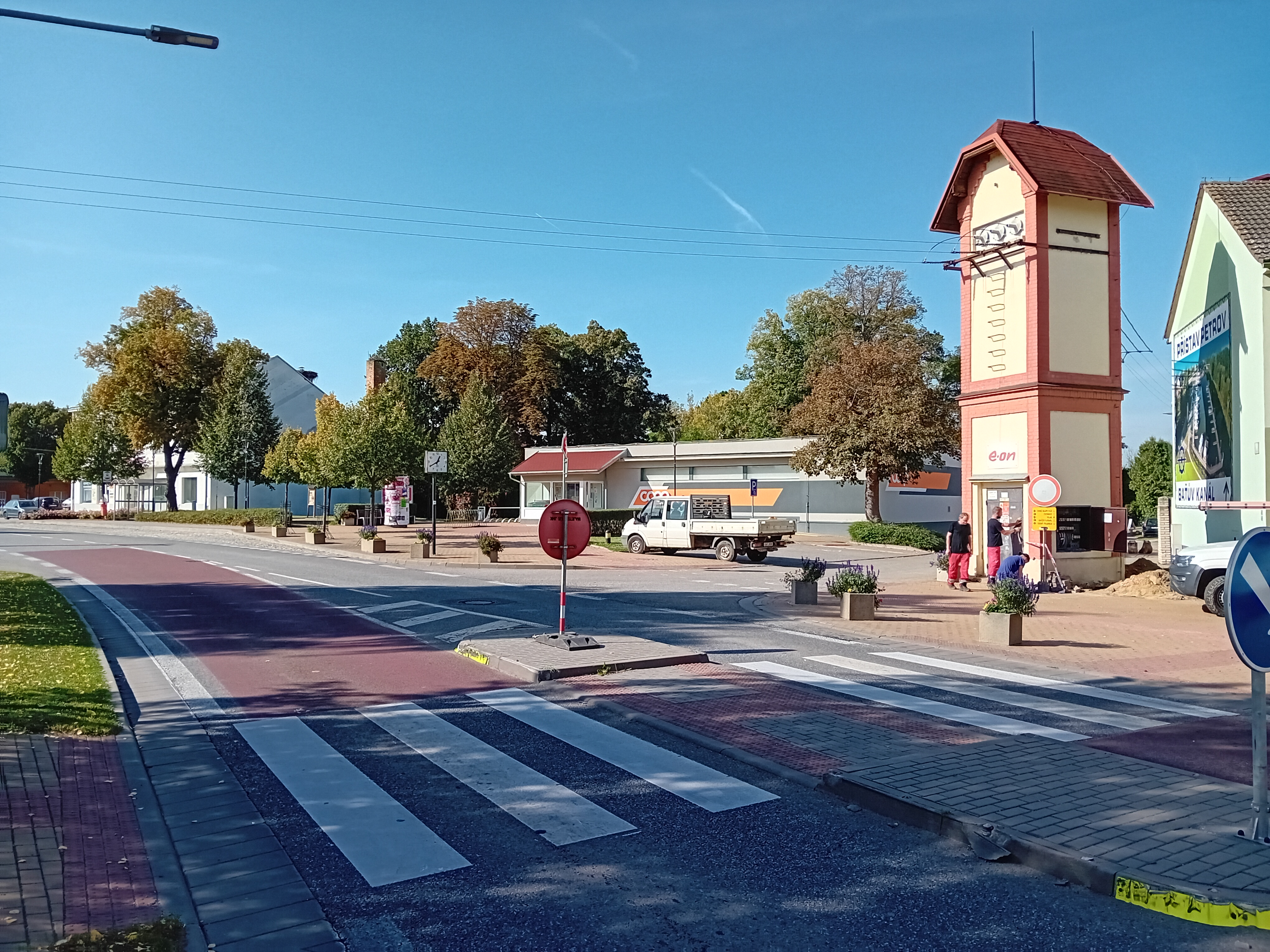
- Centre of Petrov

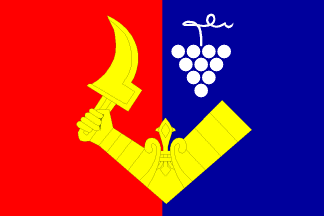
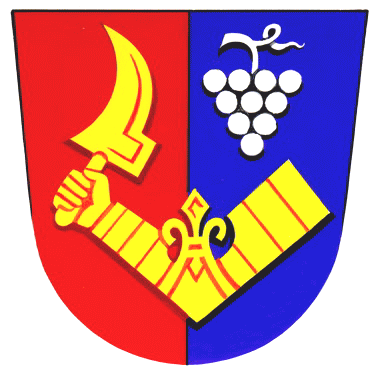
- Flag Coat of arms

- Location in the Czech Republic
- Coordinates: 48°52′55″N 17°16′41″E
- Country: Czech Republic
- Region: South Moravian
- District: Hodonín
- First mentioned: 1412

Area
  - Total: 11.65 km^{2} (4.50 sq mi)
- Elevation: 171 m (561 ft)

Population (2026-01-01)
  - Total: 1,302
  - Density: 111.8/km^{2} (289.5/sq mi)
- Time zone: UTC+1 (CET)
  - Summer (DST): UTC+2 (CEST)
- Postal code: 696 65
- Website: www.obec-petrov.cz

Petrov (Czech pronunciation: [ˈpɛtrof]) is a municipality and village in Hodonín District in the South Moravian Region of the Czech Republic. It has about 1,300 inhabitants. The municipality is located in the Lower Morava Valley, at the confluence of the Radějovka Stream with the Baťa Canal.

Petrov is known for the locality of Plže with above-ground wine cellars and presses, which is protected as a village monument reservation.

== Geography ==
Petrov is located about 11 kilometres (7 mi) east of Hodonín and 58 km (36 mi) southeast of Brno. It lies in a flat landscape in the Lower Morava Valley. The Radějovka Stream and the Baťa Canal flow through the municipality. The Morava River flows along the northern municipal border.

== History ==
The first written mention of Petrov is from 1412, however it was founded probably between 1391 and 1400. The founder of Petrov was the nobleman Petr of Křavaře, after whom it is named.

=== Spa ===
The spa in Petrov was first mentioned on a map from 1569. The alkali-sulphurous ferruginous water from local springs was valued in the treatment of joint pain and skin diseases and later in musculoskeletal diseases. The spa was in operation until 1987. Today there is only one spring left.

== Demographics ==
Historical population

Year	Pop.	±%
1869	1,178	—
1880	1,230	+4.4%
1890	1,300	+5.7%
1900	1,273	−2.1%
1910	1,256	−1.3%

Year	Pop.	±%
1921	1,200	−4.5%
1930	1,246	+3.8%
1950	1,234	−1.0%
1961	1,395	+13.0%
1970	1,447	+3.7%

Year	Pop.	±%
1980	1,455	+0.6%
1991	1,386	−4.7%
2001	1,382	−0.3%
2011	1,307	−5.4%
2021	1,272	−2.7%

Source: Censuses

== Economy ==
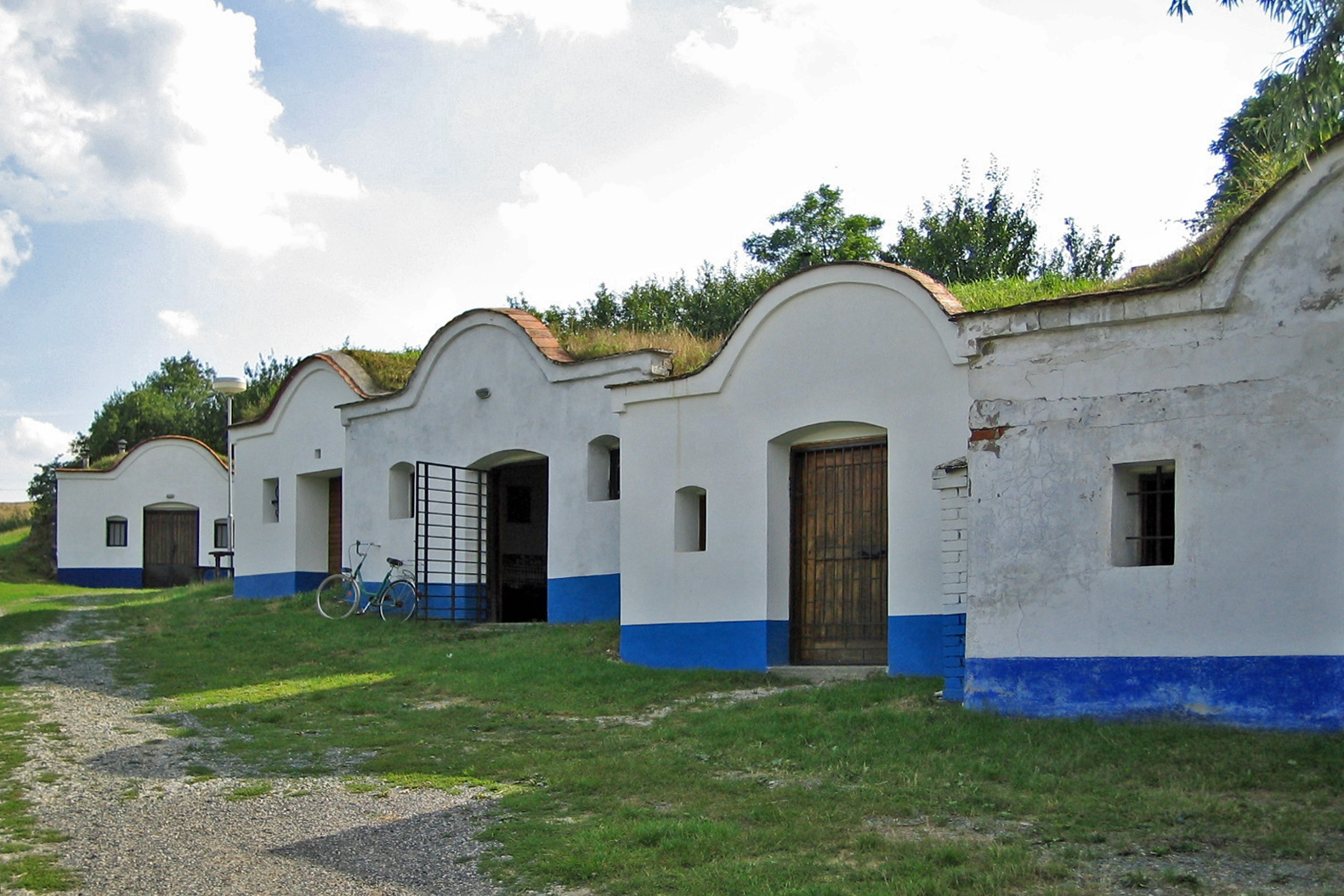
Plže wine cellars

Petrov is known for viticulture. The municipality lies in the Slovácká wine subregion.

== Transport ==
The I/55 road (the section from Hodonín to Uherské Hradiště) runs through the municipal territory.

Petrov is located on the railway line Hodonín–Javorník, but trains only run on weekends.

== Sights ==
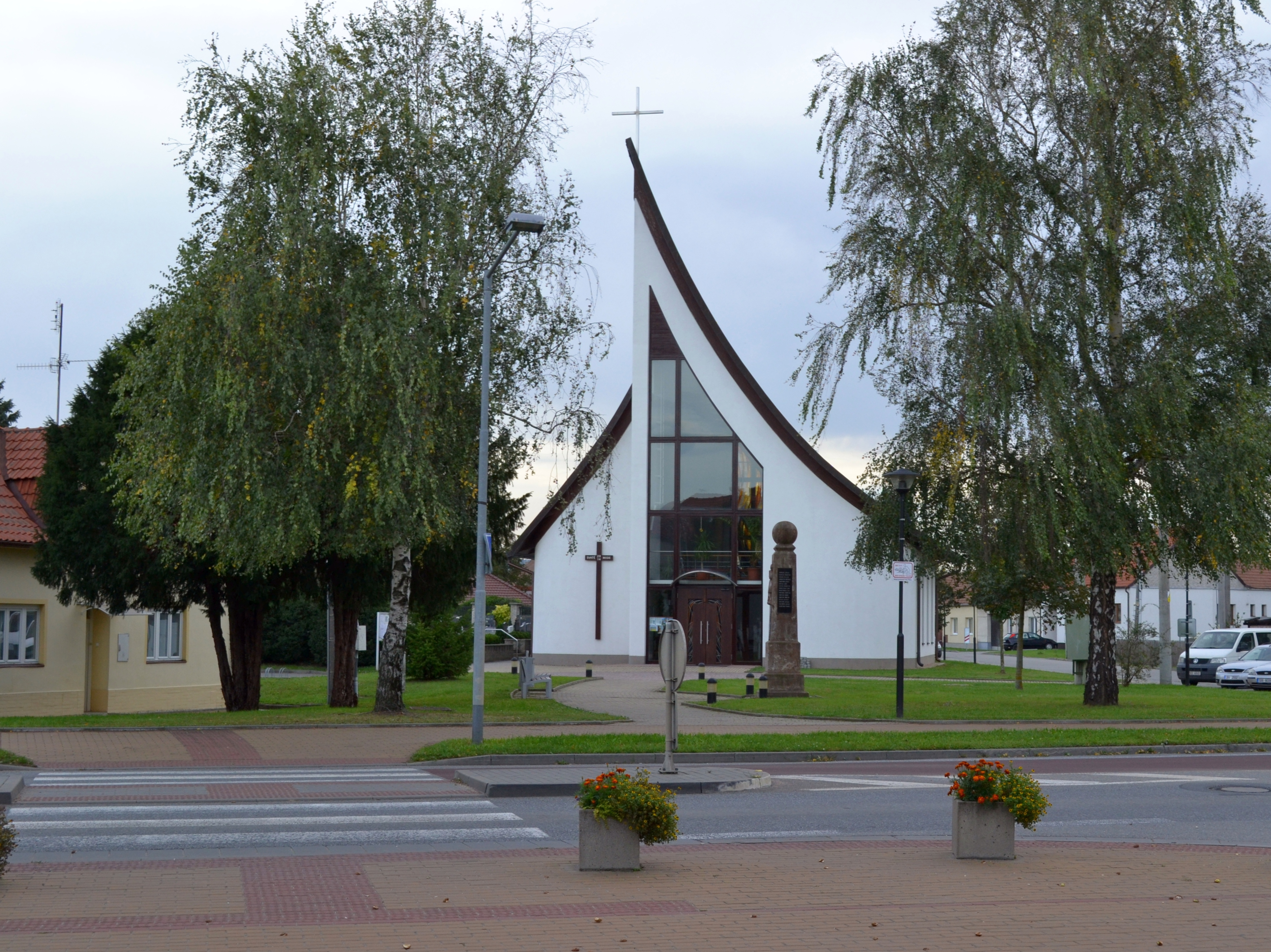
Church of Saint Wenceslaus

In the municipality there is a complex of búdy (above-ground wine cellars and presses) called Plže. The complex consists of 80 of these folk buildings built since the 15th century. The area is protected as a village monument reservation.

The main landmark of Petrov is the Church of Saint Wenceslaus. It is a modern church, built in 1997–2000.
