= Strážnice =

- Town
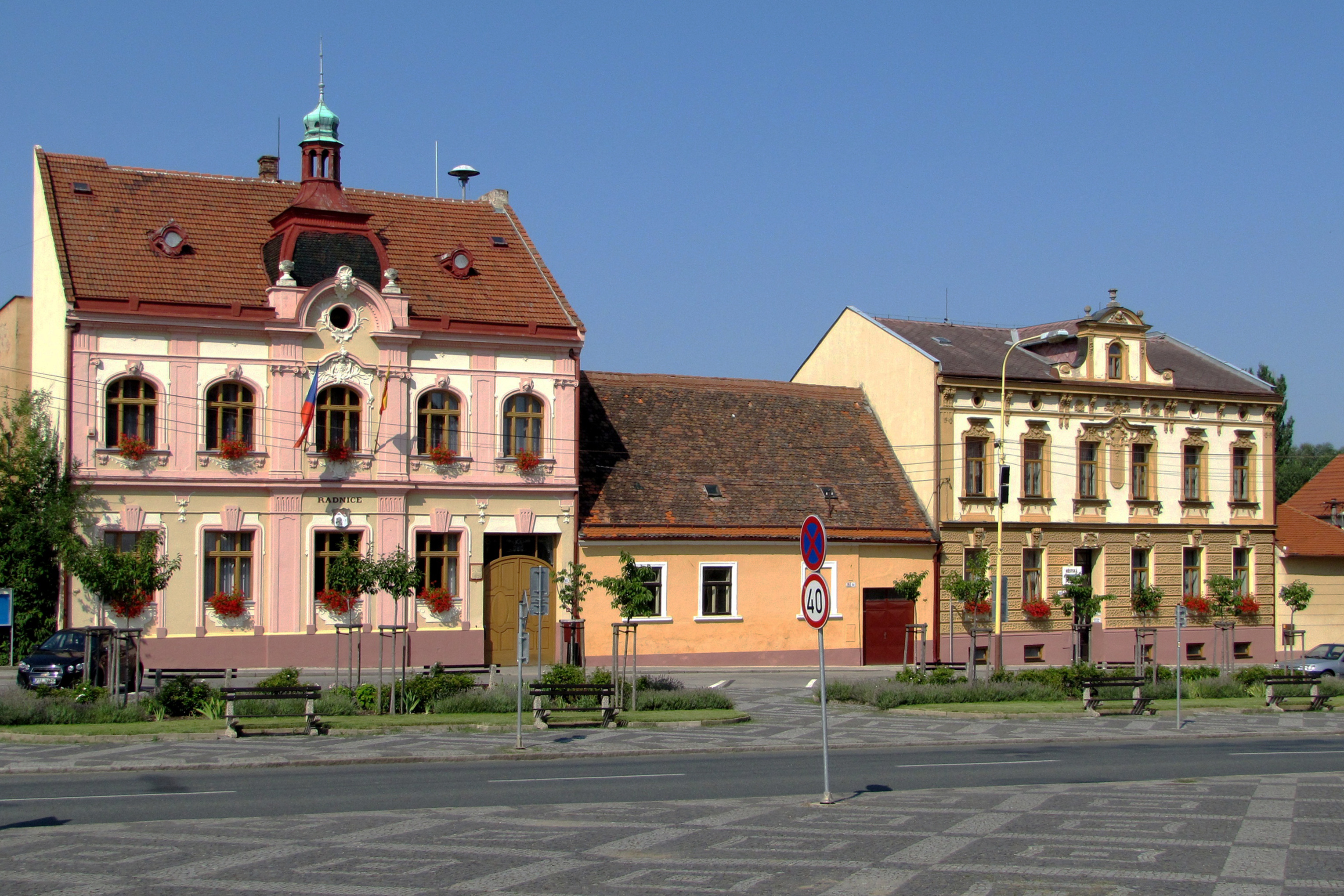
- Town square with the town hall

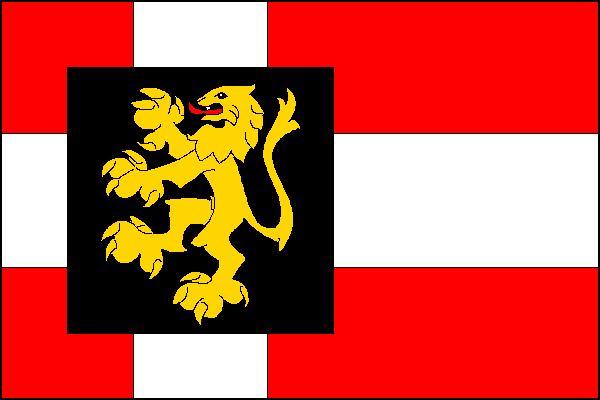
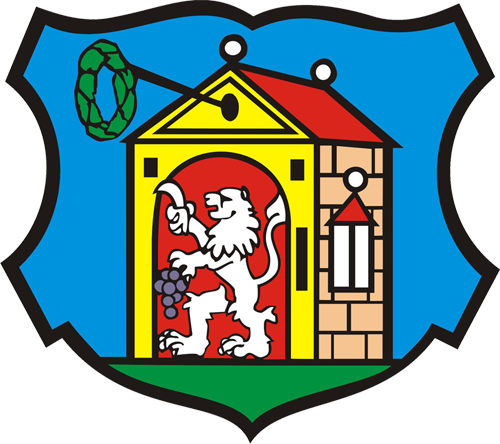
- Flag Coat of arms

- Location in the Czech Republic
- Coordinates: 48°54′4″N 17°19′0″E
- Country: Czech Republic
- Region: South Moravian
- District: Hodonín
- First mentioned: 1302

Government
  - Mayor: Risto Ljasovský

Area
  - Total: 31.41 km^{2} (12.13 sq mi)
- Elevation: 177 m (581 ft)

Population (2026-01-01)
  - Total: 5,282
  - Density: 168.2/km^{2} (435.5/sq mi)
- Time zone: UTC+1 (CET)
  - Summer (DST): UTC+2 (CEST)
- Postal code: 696 62
- Website: www.straznice-mesto.cz

Strážnice (Czech pronunciation: [ˈstraːʒɲɪtsɛ]; German: Straßnitz) is a town in Hodonín District in the South Moravian Region of the Czech Republic. It has about 5,300 inhabitants. The town lies near the border with Slovakia, in the ethnographic region of Moravian Slovakia. It is located in the Lower Morava Valley near the Morava River. The Baťa Canal flows through the town.

Strážnice experienced its greatest expansion in the 16th century under the rule of the Zierotin family and became one of the most important Moravian towns at that time. The historic town centre is well preserved and is protected as an urban monument zone. The town is known for the Strážnice Castle and for an ethnographic open-air museum.

== Etymology ==
The name Strážnice is derived from the Czech word stráž (i.e. 'guard') and refers to the original function of the castle that was built here in the 13th century.

== Geography ==
Strážnice is located about 14 kilometres (9 mi) northeast of Hodonín. It lies in the Lower Morava Valley. The highest point is at 370 m (1,214 ft) above sea level. The Morava River flows along the northwestern border of the municipal territory. The Velička River flows through the northern part of Strážnice and joins the Morava just outside the territory of Strážnice. The Baťa Canal flows through the town, crossing the Velička.

The southern part of Strážnice lies in the Bílé Karpaty Protected Landscape Area, even though the town does not extend into the eponymous mountain range. The municipal territory briefly borders Slovakia in the south.

== History ==
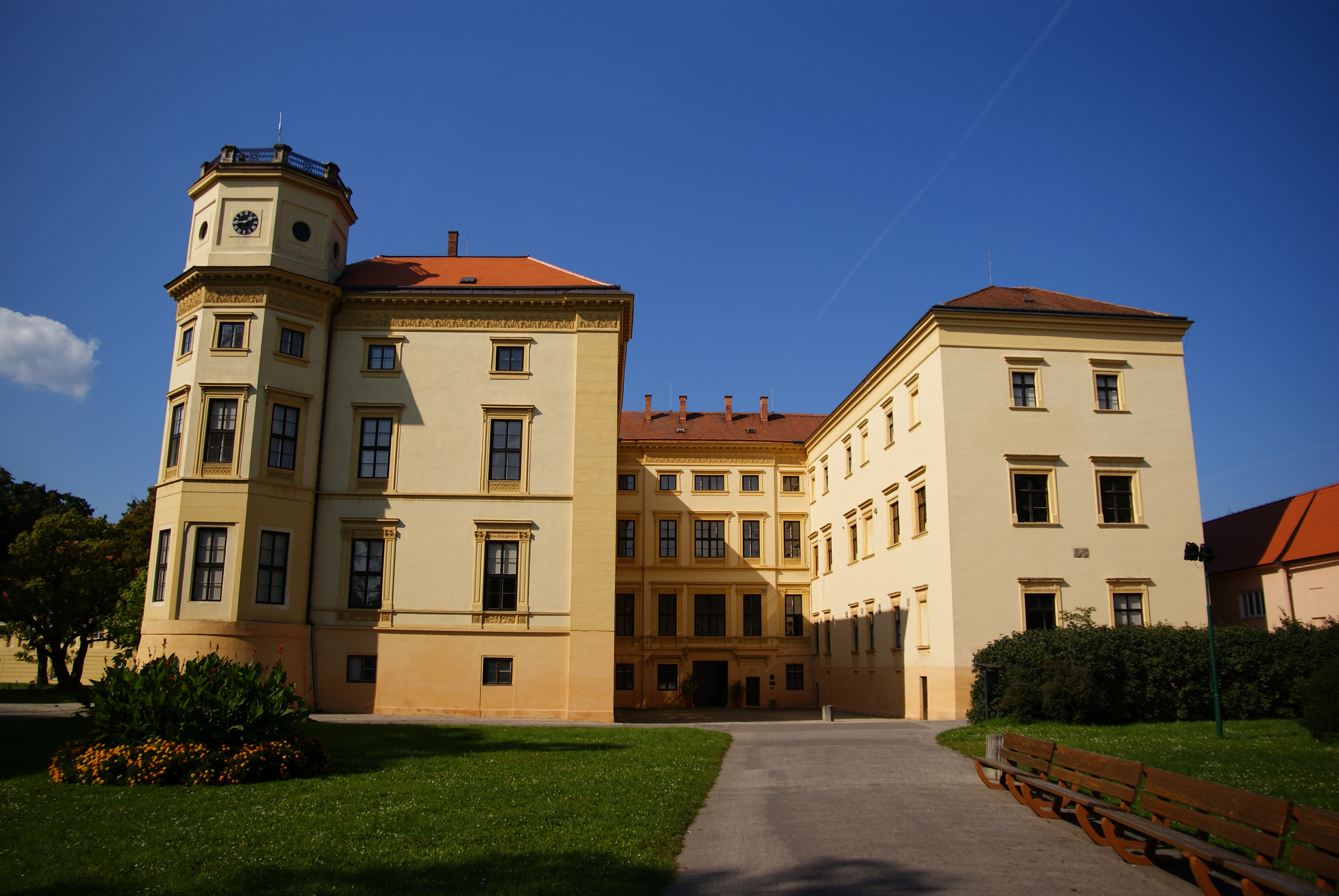
Strážnice Castle

The area has been inhabited since time immemorial. Items from the Neolithic Linear Pottery culture have been found here.

The first written mention of Strážnice is from 1302. A water castle guarding the Hungarian border was built here after 1260. In the 13th century, Strážnice was acquired by the Lords of Kravaře. Petr Strážnický of Kravaře contributed to the prosperity of the town and expanded the Strážnice estate After the town was severely damaged in the Hussite Wars, it recovered and expanded during the rule of Jiří of Kravaře.

In the early 16th century, the Strážnice estate was bought by the Zierotin family. During their rule, Strážnice achieved its greatest prosperity. The town was fortified and the old castle was rebuilt to a Renaissance residence. At the beginning of the 17th century, it was one of the most populated and most important Moravian towns.

In 1605, Strážnice was burned down by Stephen Bocskai and his army and many people were killed. During the Thirty Years' War, the town further suffered and was repeatedly ravaged. In 1628, Strážnice was bought by František Magnis and the catholicisation of the town began. A large fire in 1652, plague epidemics in 1680, and another Hungarian raid in 1683 caused the decline of the estate and the town lost its former significance.

== Demographics ==
Historical population

Year	Pop.	±%
1869	4,957	—
1880	5,229	+5.5%
1890	5,211	−0.3%
1900	5,217	+0.1%
1910	5,411	+3.7%

Year	Pop.	±%
1921	5,470	+1.1%
1930	5,225	−4.5%
1950	4,981	−4.7%
1961	5,421	+8.8%
1970	5,444	+0.4%

Year	Pop.	±%
1980	6,181	+13.5%
1991	6,081	−1.6%
2001	5,983	−1.6%
2011	5,703	−4.7%
2021	5,341	−6.3%

Source: Censuses

== Transport ==
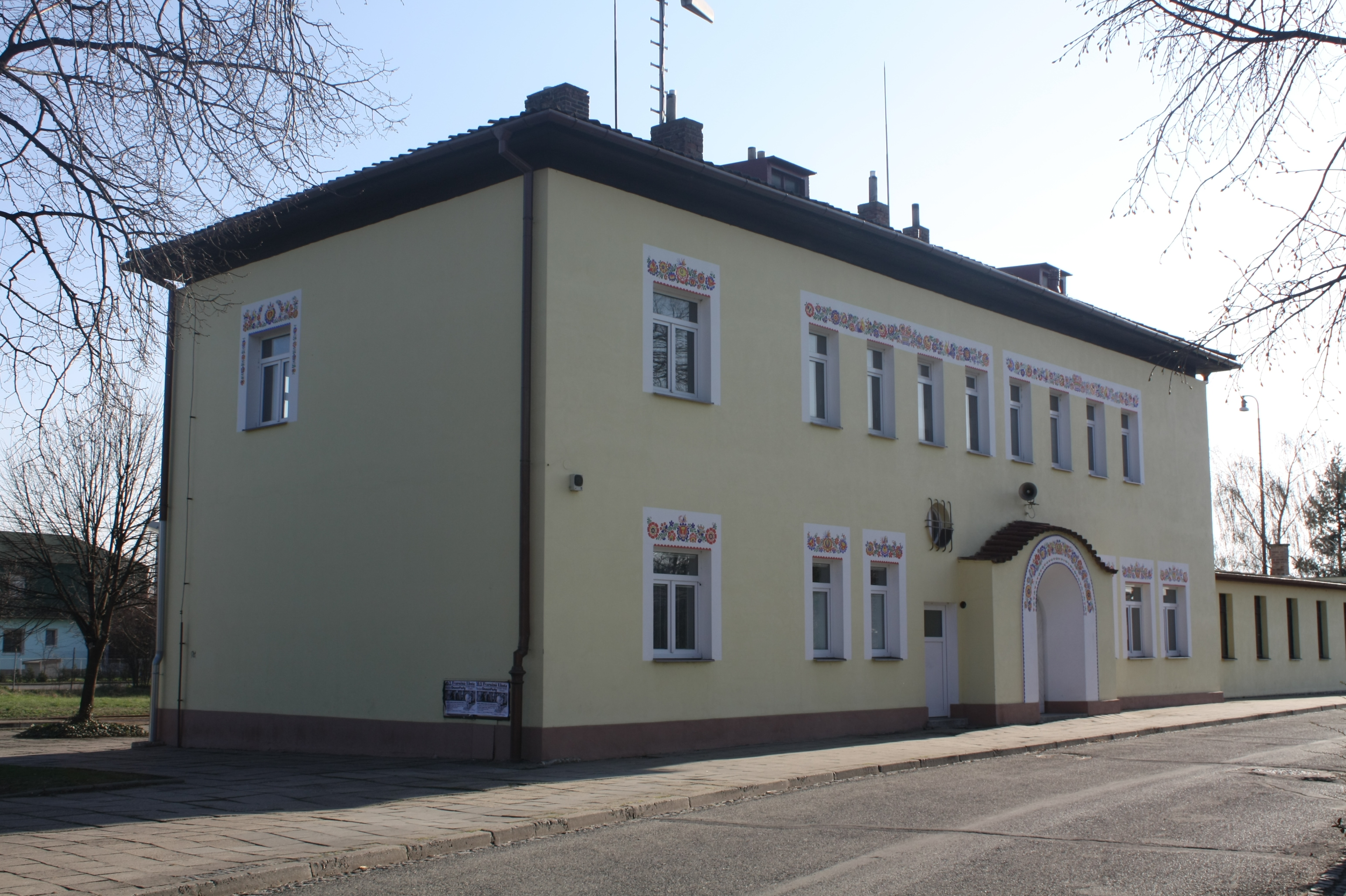
Train station

Strážnice is located on a railway line heading from Hodonín to Veselí nad Moravou and Vrbovce, Slovakia.

== Culture ==
Strážnice lies in the ethnographic region of Moravian Slovakia.

== Sights ==
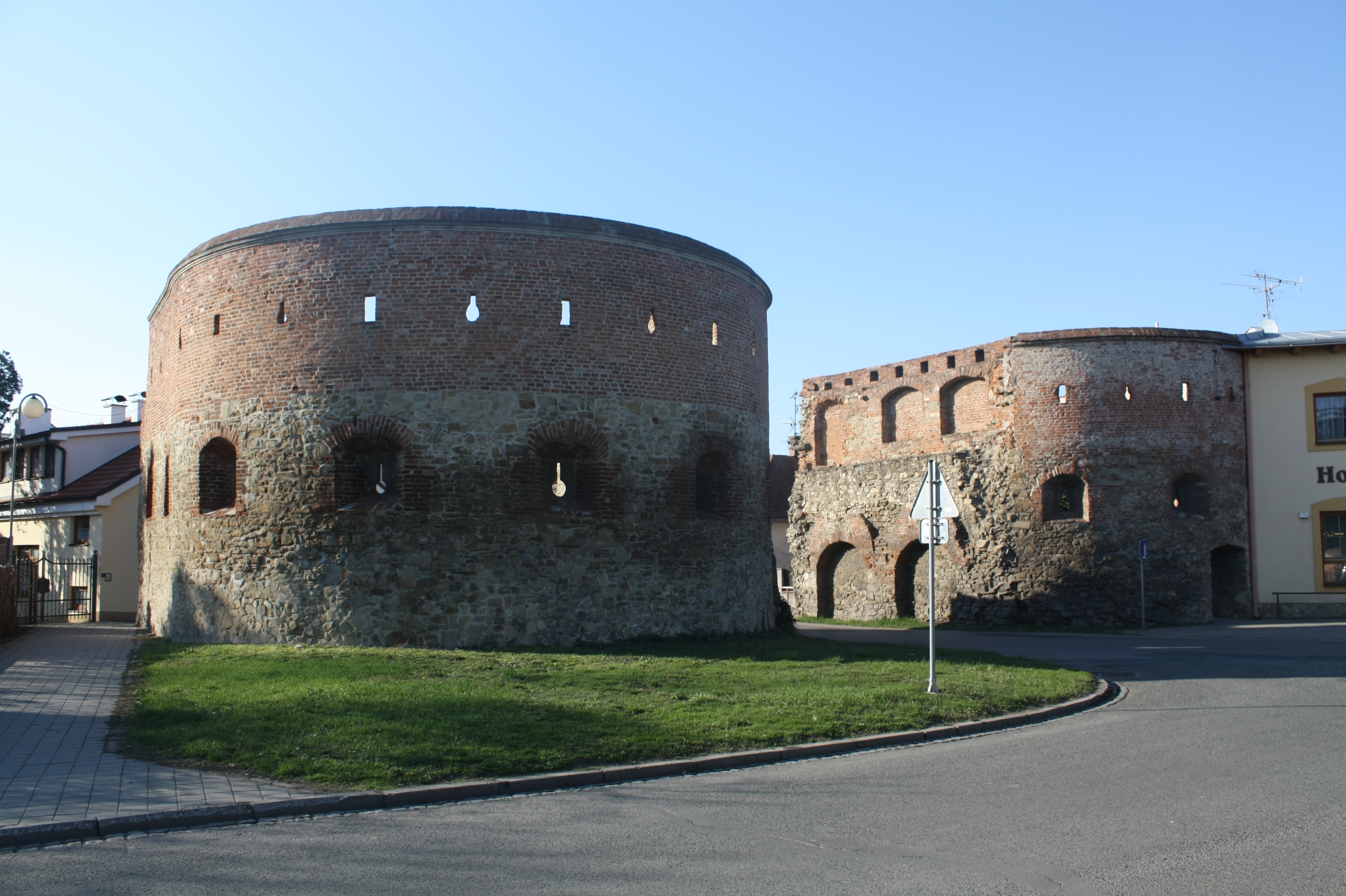
Veselí Gate

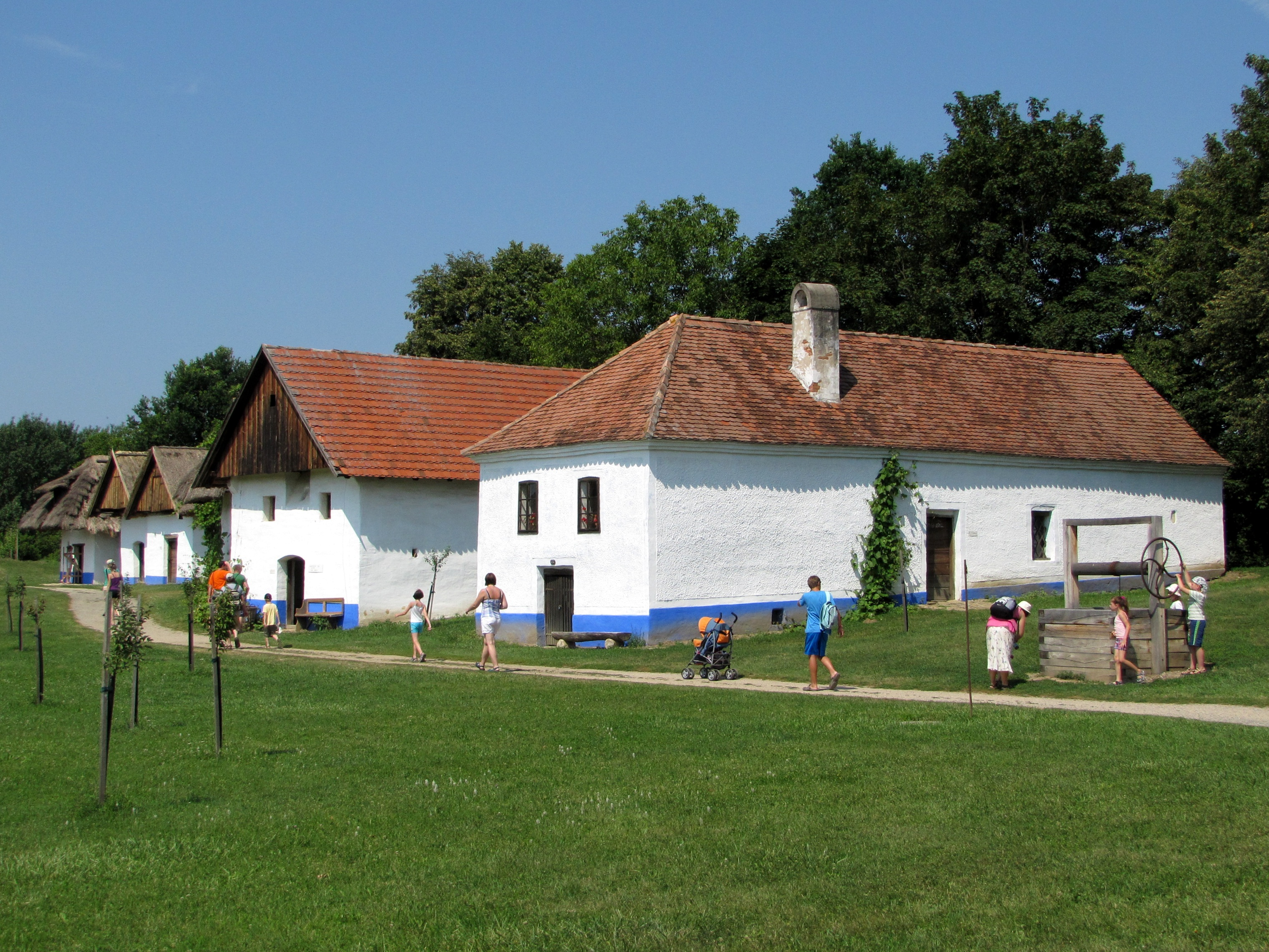
Open-air museum

The Strážnice Castle was rebuilt to its current Neo-Renaissance form with Neoclassical elements in the mid-19th century. Today the castle houses the National Institute of Folk Culture. There is a permanent exposition of "Folk instruments of the Czech Republic" and a historical library with more than 13,000 books. The castle is surrounded by a large English park with the longest plane alley in Central Europe founded in the first half of the 19th century. Amphitheatres, a summer cinema, lakes, a dendrology path with educational boards are located in the park.

The Jewish cemetery was founded in the mid-17th century. It is about 1,500 gravestones in an area of about 5,000 m^{2} (1.2 acres). The neighbouring synagogue was built in 1804, after the old synagogue of unknown age was destroyed by a fire. In 1870, the synagogue was reconstructed. After it was severely damaged in 1941 and then used as a warehouse, it was returned to the Brno Jewish Community in 1991 and renovated. Today it is a part of Strážnice Museum and contains various Jewish-related expositions.

The roads leading to the neighbouring towns of Veselí nad Moravou and Skalica are flanked by massive century bastions from the late 16th century. They are the remains of gates built as part of fortifications of the town from the threat of Turkish invasions.

Strážnice is known for an ethnographic open-air museum called Strážnice Museum of the Villages of South-east Moravia. It was opened in 1981. It presents traditional village buildings in subregions of the cultural region of the Moravian Slovakia.

The second-largest service tree (Cormus domestica) in Europe grows in Strážnice. The tree, called Adamcova oskeruše ("Adamec's service tree"), has a circumference of 4.72 m (15.5 ft) (according to the latest measurement in 2016) and is estimated to be 415 years old (as of 2025).

== Notable people ==
- John Amos Comenius (1592–1670), philosopher and pedagogue; lived and studied here in 1604–1605
- Jan Evangelista Purkyně (1787–1869), anatomist and physiologist; worked here as a pedagogue
- Tomáš Garrigue Masaryk (1850–1937), politician and the first president of Czechoslovakia; studied here
- Joseph Tomanek (1889–1974), Czech-American artist

== Twin towns – sister cities ==
Strážnice is twinned with:

- Skalica, Slovakia

== Gallery ==
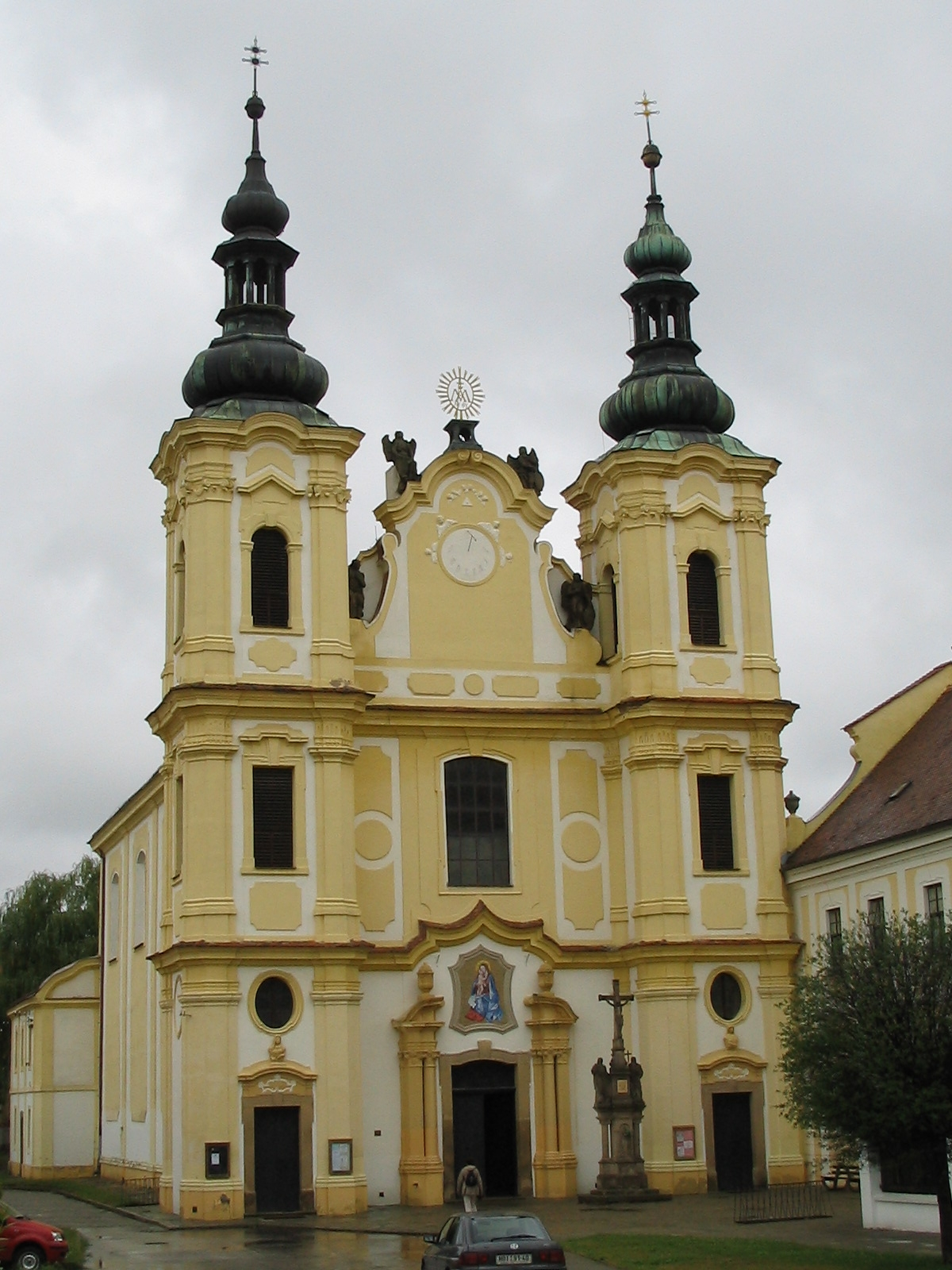
Church of the Assumption of the Virgin Mary

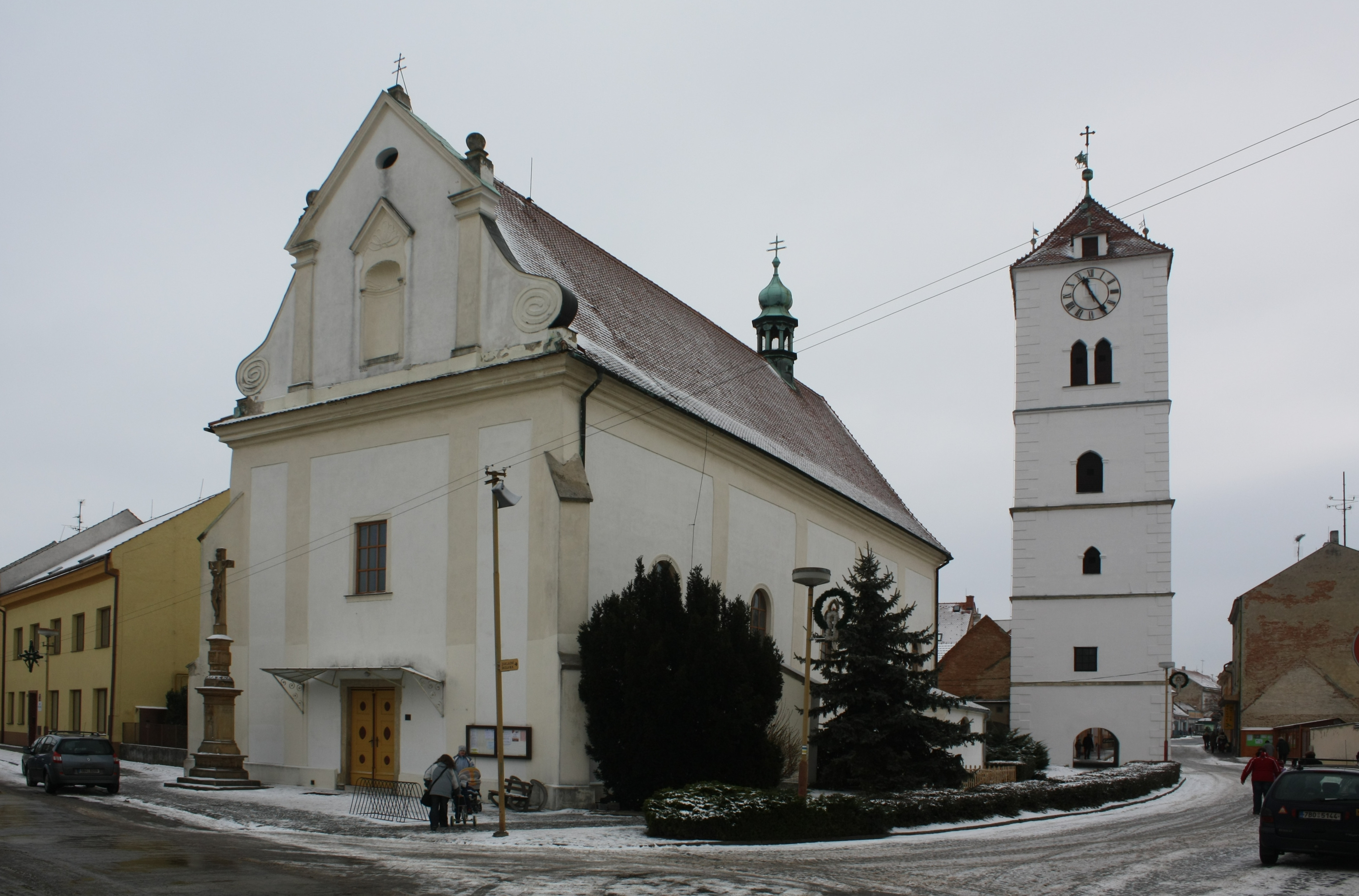
Church of St. Martin and White Tower

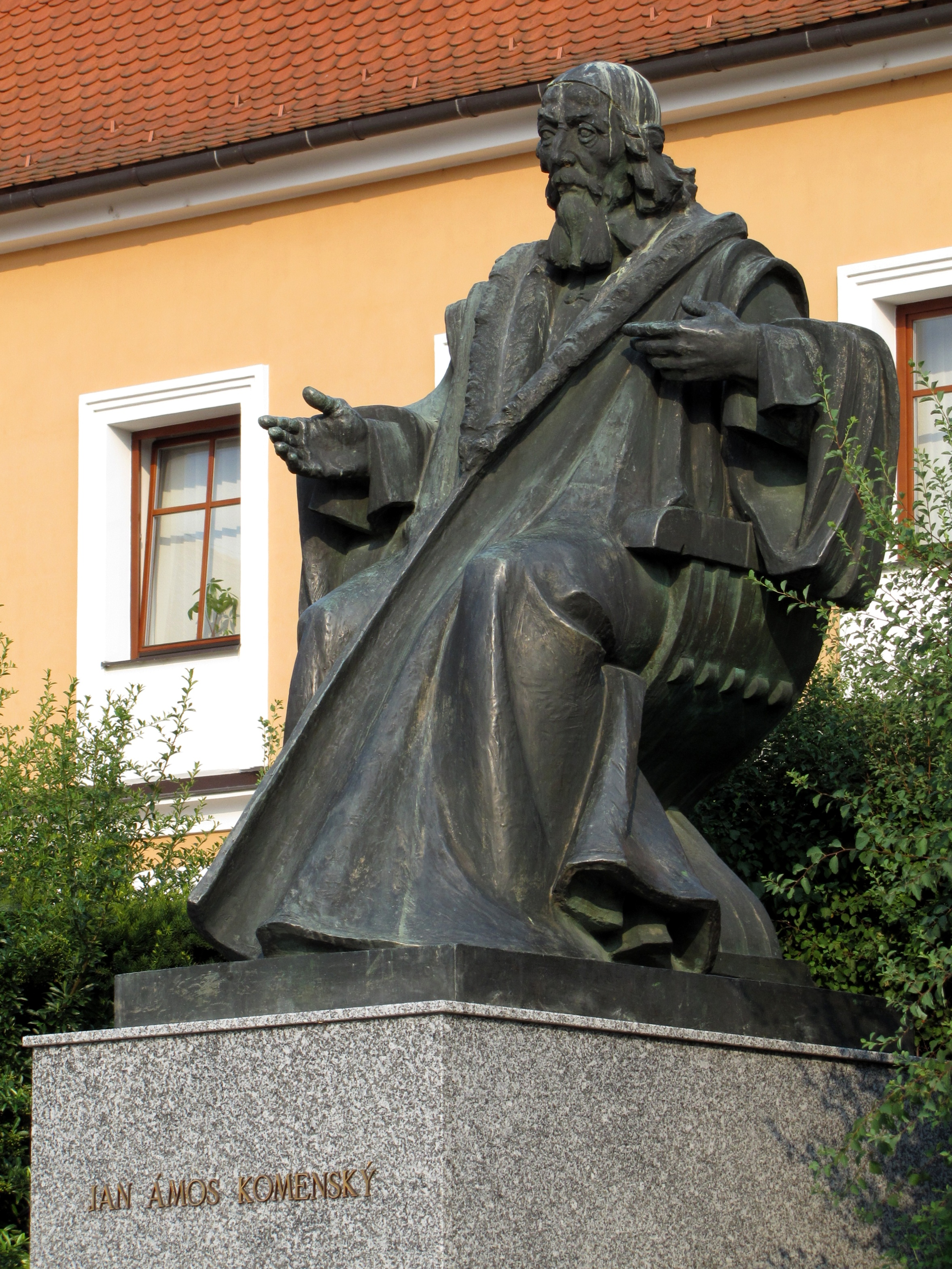
Statue of J. A. Comenius

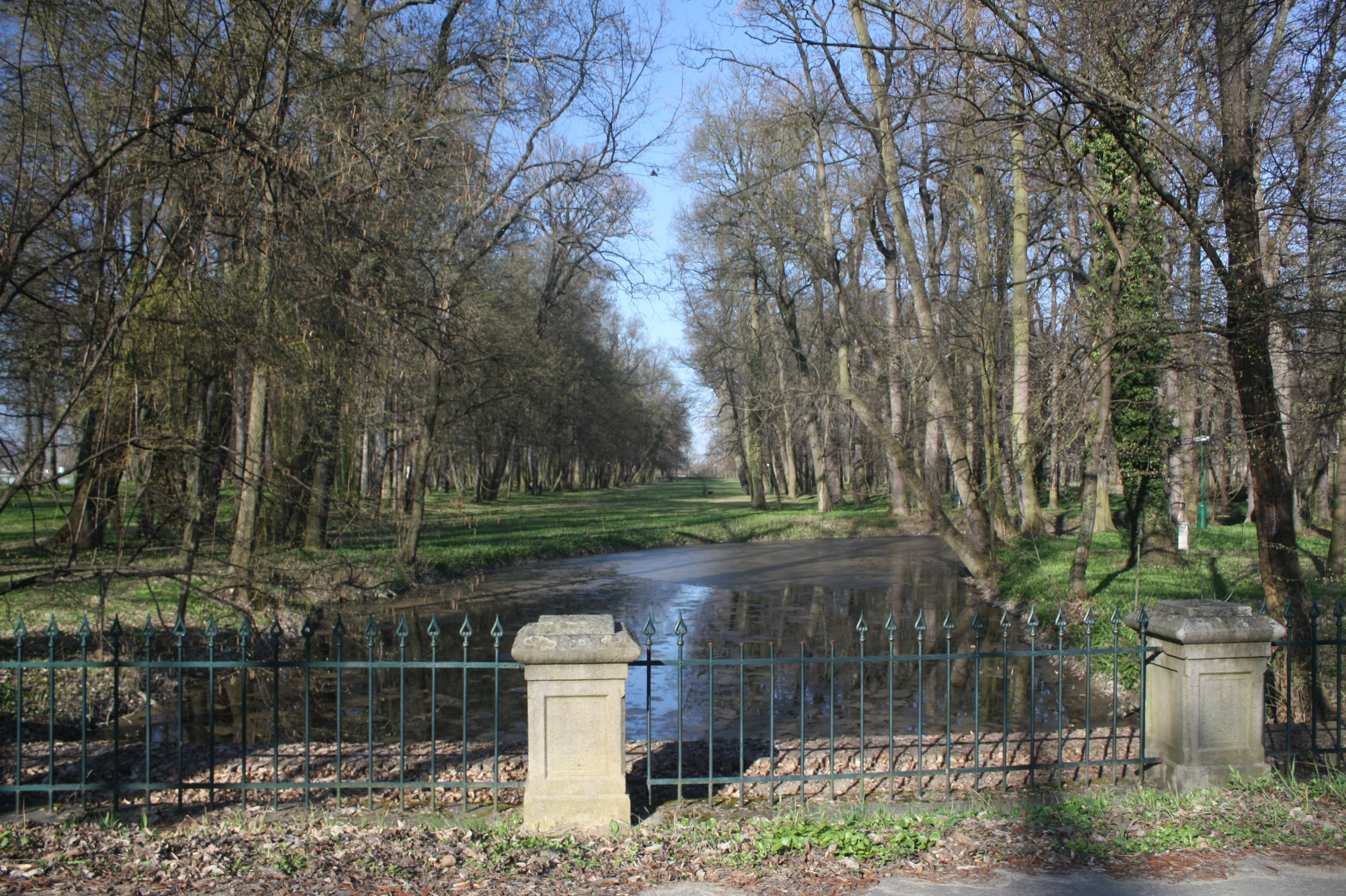
Castle park

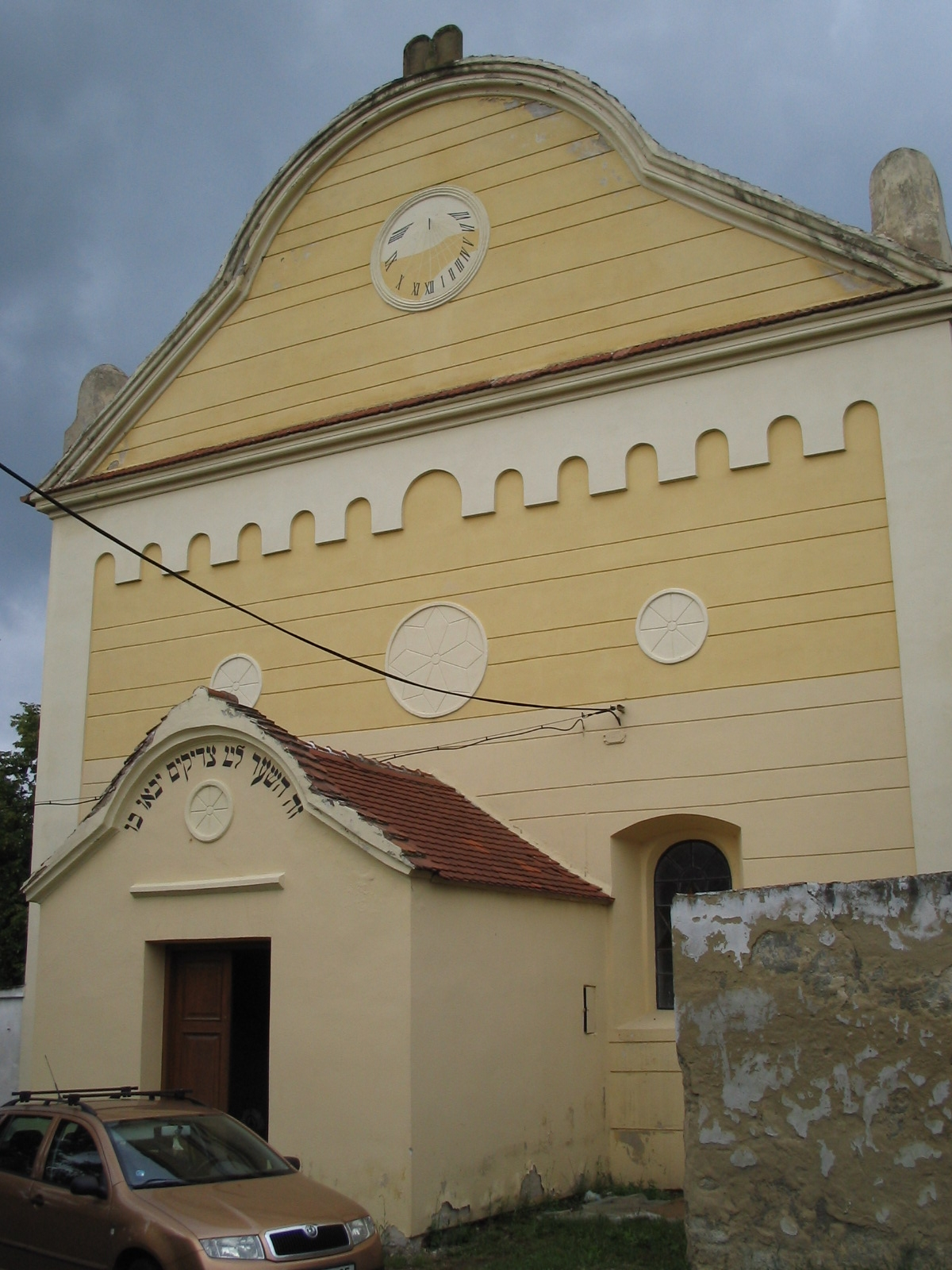
Synagogue
