= Edward Murray (colonial administrator) =

Edward Murray (c. 1800 - 9 June 1874) was the Registrar of Slaves and later Marshal of the Island of Trinidad in the 19th century.

Edward Murray was born around 1800, the son of Henry Murray who occupied a number of public offices in Trinidad. He succeeded his father as a slave registrar. His youngest son was the obstetrician Gustavus Murray (1831-1887) who practiced in London and who was the inspiration of The Doctor (painting) by Luke Fildes in 1891. Murray was appointed Registrar of Slaves in 1821 after having deputised for his father who had also been registrar. In April 1851 he was made Marshal of the Island of Trinidad. Murray died in Port of Spain on 9 June 1874 at the age of seventy four.

== See also ==
- Slavery in Trinidad
