= Albert Rinsler =

British historian (1923–2010)

- Born: 1923
- Died: 2010 (aged 86–87)
- Medical career
- Profession: Physician
- Field: General Practice

Albert Rinsler (1923-25 November 2010) was a British physician, historian, and archivist, known for his research on Luke Fildes' painting The Doctor.

== Selected publications ==
- "The Doctor". Journal of Medical Biography. 1 (3): 165–170. 1 August 1993. doi:10.1177/096777209300100307. PMID 11615259. S2CID 5671206.
- An illustrated history of the Royal Northern Hospital, 1856-1992 / Albert Rinsler. 2007.
