= Karel Benedík =

Czech painter (1923–1997)

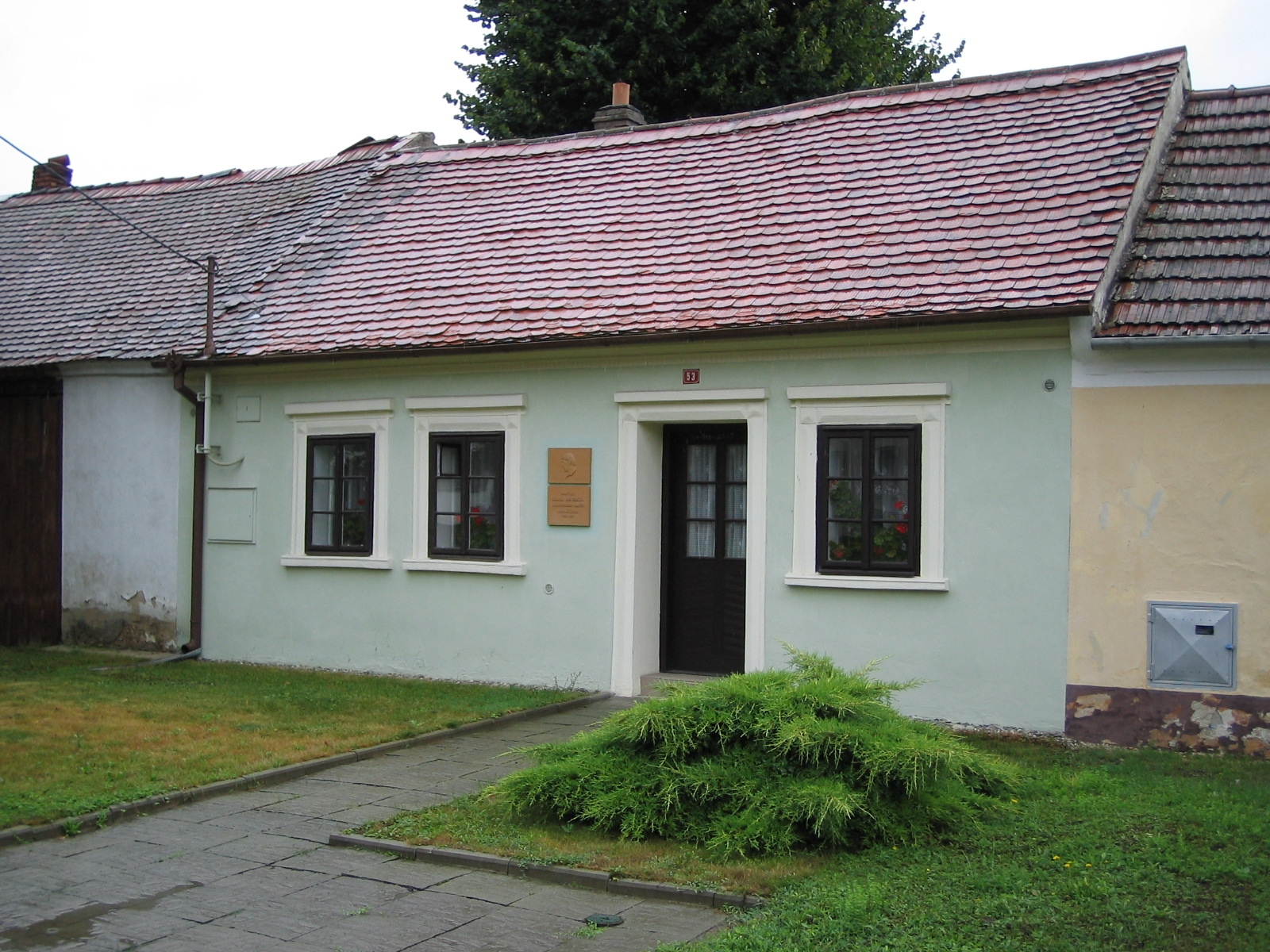
Benedík's birth house in Kozojídky

Karel Benedík (6 November 1923 in Kozojídky – 17 January 1997 in Veselí nad Moravou) was a Czech painter and restorer. He first trained as a painter, then studied at the Academy of Fine Arts in Prague, and focused on restoration work. He painted landscapes, portraits and also showed an interest in Moravian folk costumes.

His restoration work includes a triptych ceiling in the hall of Kroměříž Castle, frescoes in the library and the refectory of the Hradisko Monastery, wall painting in a pharmacy in Uherské Hradiště and three altarpieces in the Church of the Assumption of the Virgin Mary in Kokory.

== See also ==
- List of Czech painters
