= Joseph Tomanek =

Czech-American painter

Joseph Tomanek (16 April 1889 – 31 December 1974) was a Czech-American artist who practiced in Chicago. He was influenced by Bouguereau.

== Early life ==
Joseph Tomanek was born on 16 April 1889 in Strážnice, Austria-Hungary (modern-day Czech Republic).

== Career ==
He trained at the Art Institute of Chicago and the Academy of Fine Arts in Prague and studied under A.H. Krehbiel, A. Sterba, and K.A. Buehr. He arrived in Chicago in 1910. He modelled himself on Bouguereau and was associated with the Bohemian Arts Club of Chicago.

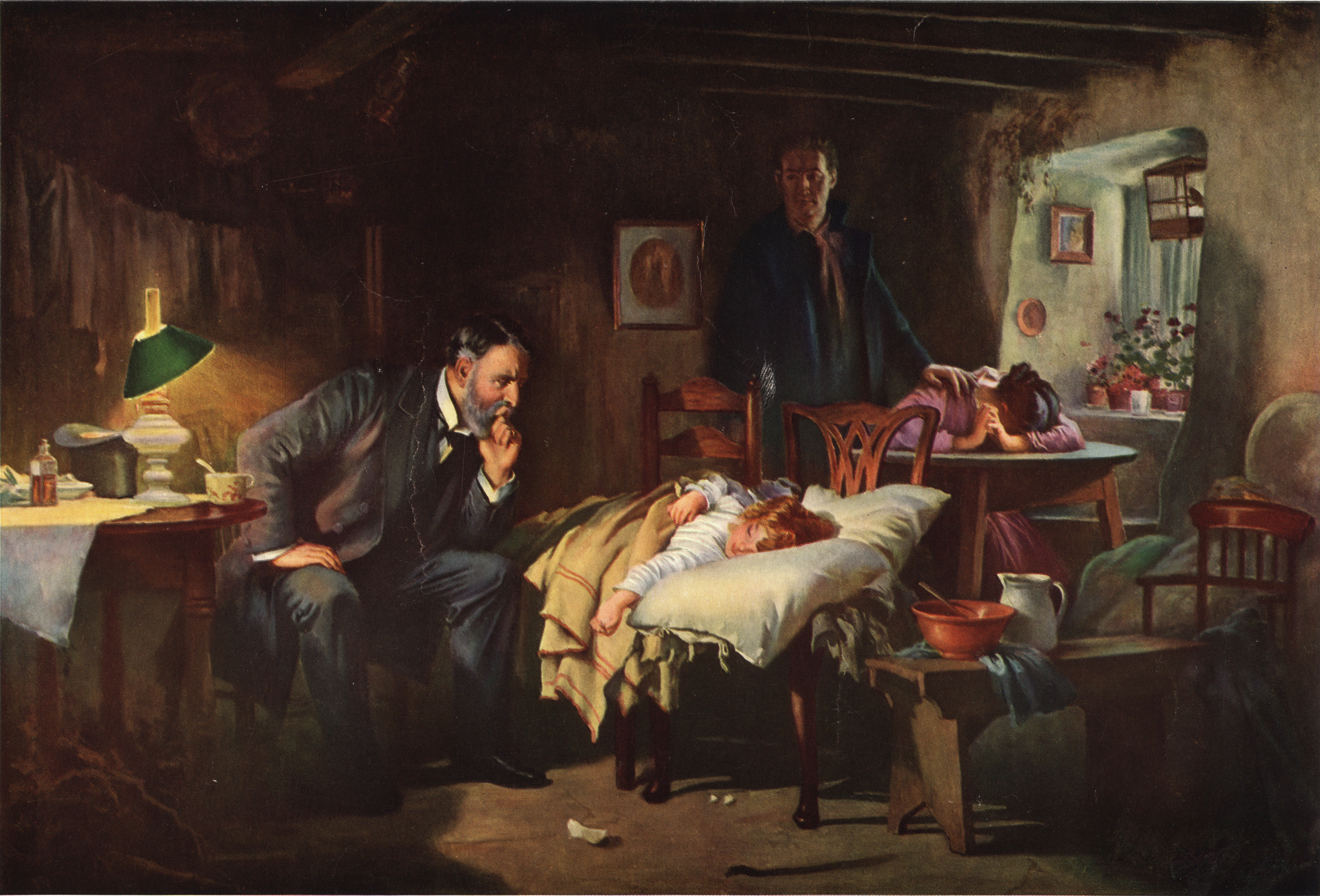
The Doctor, 1933, after Luke Fildes

In 1933 he painted a copy of Luke Fildes' 1891 The Doctor which has sometimes been confused with the original.

== Death ==
Tomanek died on 31 December 1974 in Berwyn, Illinois.
