= Kozojídky =

- Municipality
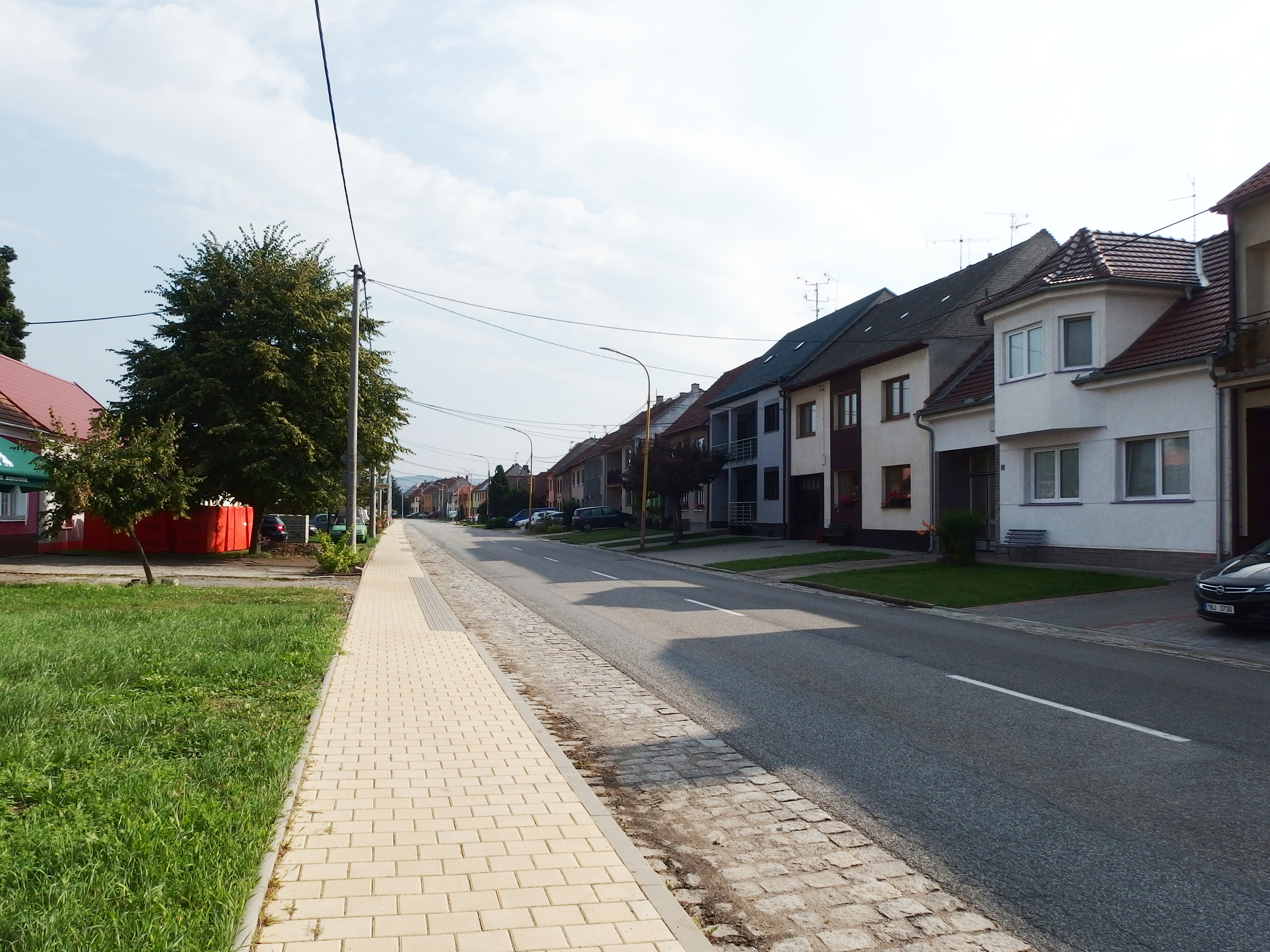
- Main street

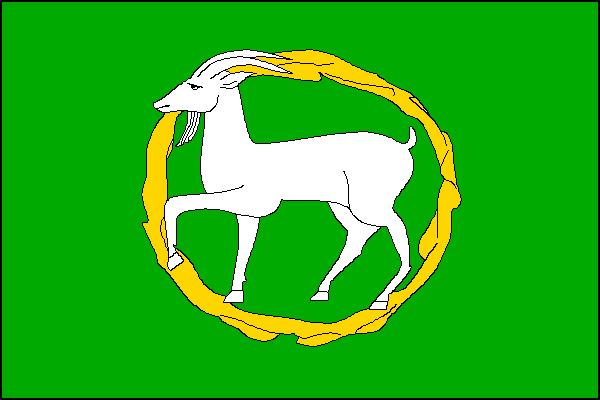
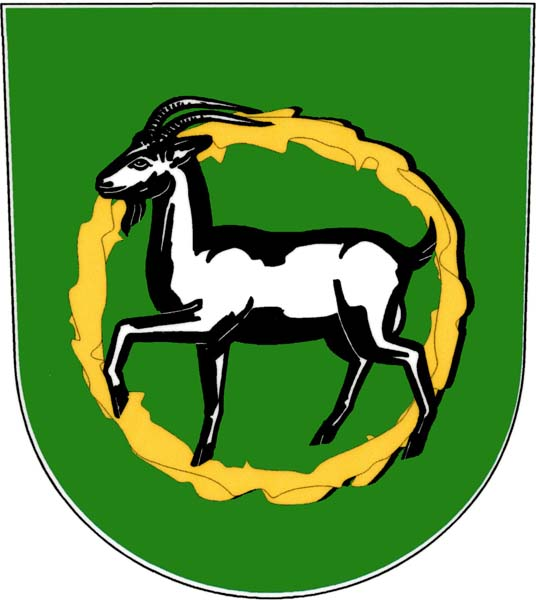
- Flag Coat of arms

- Location in the Czech Republic
- Coordinates: 48°55′7″N 17°23′59″E
- Country: Czech Republic
- Region: South Moravian
- District: Hodonín
- First mentioned: 1490

Area
  - Total: 2.92 km^{2} (1.13 sq mi)
- Elevation: 192 m (630 ft)

Population (2026-01-01)
  - Total: 563
  - Density: 193/km^{2} (499/sq mi)
- Time zone: UTC+1 (CET)
  - Summer (DST): UTC+2 (CEST)
- Postal code: 696 63
- Website: www.kozojidky.cz

Kozojídky is a municipality and village in Hodonín District in the South Moravian Region of the Czech Republic. It has about 600 inhabitants.

Kozojídky lies approximately 22 kilometres (14 mi) east of Hodonín, 66 km (41 mi) south-east of Brno, and 252 km (157 mi) south-east of Prague.

== Demographics ==
Historical population
Year	Pop.	±%
1869	253	—
1880	277	+9.5%
1890	300	+8.3%
1900	300	+0.0%
1910	334	+11.3%
1921	344	+3.0%
1930	330	−4.1%
1950	346	+4.8%
1961	415	+19.9%
1970	417	+0.5%
1980	391	−6.2%
1991	440	+12.5%
2001	468	+6.4%
2011	516	+10.3%
2021	507	−1.7%
Source: Censuses

== Notable people ==
- Karel Benedík (1923–1997), painter
