= Veselí nad Moravou =

- Town
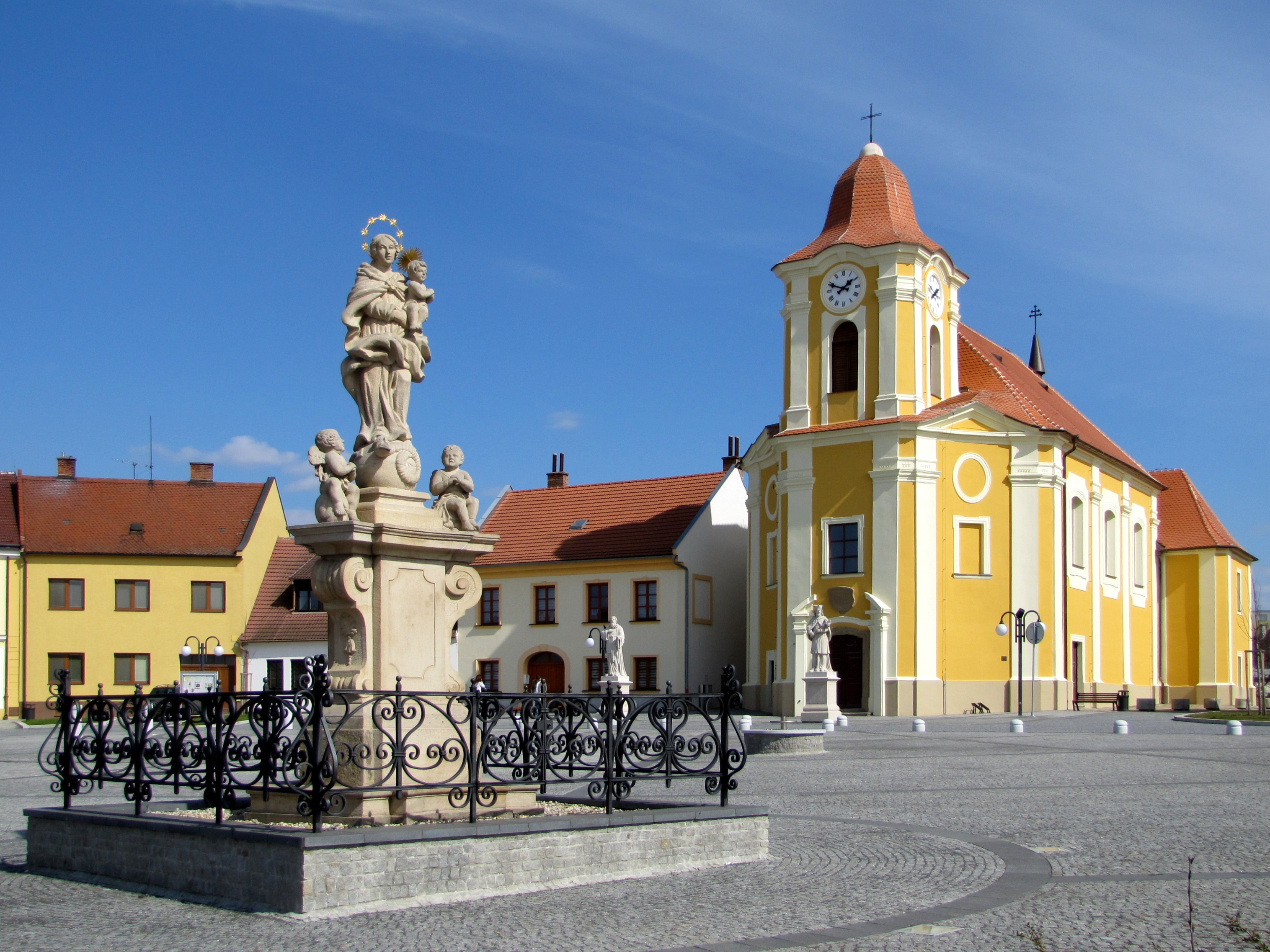
- The square Bartolomějské náměstí

- Flag Coat of arms

- Location in the Czech Republic
- Coordinates: 48°57′13″N 17°22′35″E
- Country: Czech Republic
- Region: South Moravian
- District: Hodonín
- First mentioned: 1261

Government
  - Mayor: Petr Kolář (TOP 09)

Area
  - Total: 35.45 km^{2} (13.69 sq mi)
- Elevation: 176 m (577 ft)

Population (2026-01-01)
  - Total: 10,574
  - Density: 298.3/km^{2} (772.5/sq mi)
- Time zone: UTC+1 (CET)
  - Summer (DST): UTC+2 (CEST)
- Postal code: 698 01
- Website: www.veseli-nad-moravou.cz

Veselí nad Moravou (Czech pronunciation: [ˈvɛsɛliː ˈnad moravou]; German: Wessely (an der March)) is a town in the South Moravian Region of the Czech Republic. It has about 11,000 inhabitants. The town is located on the Morava River, on the border between the Lower Morava Valley and Vizovice Highlands.

The historic town centre is well preserved and is protected as an urban monument zone. Among the main landmarks of Veselí nad Moravou are the Church of the Holy Guardian Angels and the Veselí nad Moravou Castle.

== Administrative division ==
Veselí nad Moravou consists of three municipal parts (in brackets population according to the 2021 census):

- Veselí nad Moravou (8,822)
- Milokošť (730)
- Zarazice (803)

== Geography ==
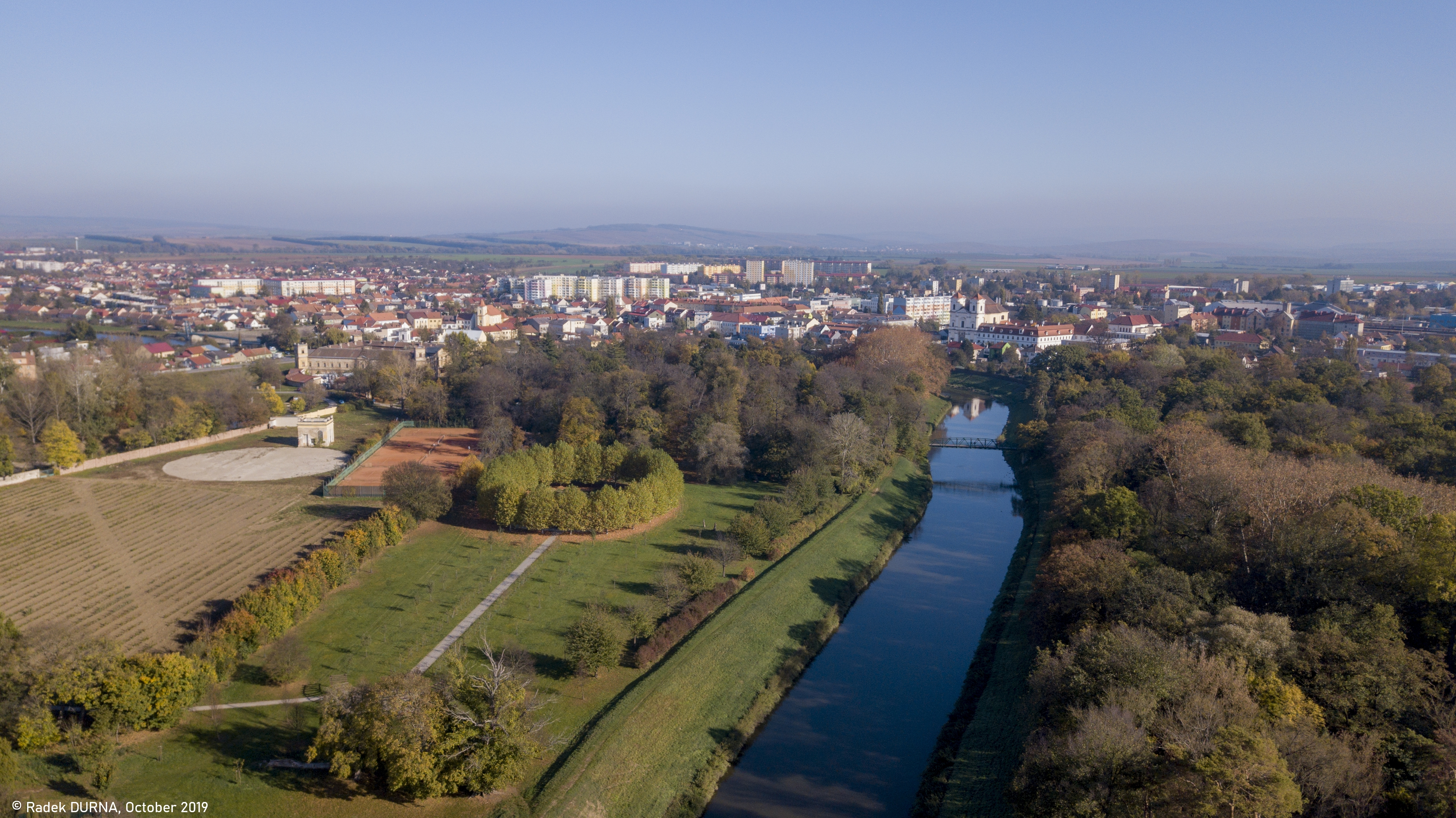
Castle park and the Morava River

Veselí nad Moravou is located about 21 kilometres (13 mi) northeast of Hodonín. The western part of the municipal territory lies in the Lower Morava Valley and the eastern part lies in the Vizovice Highlands. The highest point is the hill Radošov with an elevation of 246 metres (807 ft). The town is situated on the Morava River. Part of the Baťa Canal runs along the river.

== History ==
The first written mention of Veselí is from 1261, when a water castle with a settlement existed here. In c. 1370–1375, a town that took the name Veselí was founded. The original settlement developed separately and was known as Předměstí Veselí (lit. 'Veselí suburb').

In 1526, Veselí was acquired by Hynek Bilík of Kornice, who had the castle rebuilt into a Renaissance residence. In the Thirty Years' War, Veselí and Předměstí Veselí were burned down several times, and the castle was looted. The Chorinský family, who bought the Veselí estate in 1731, had rebuilt the castle to its current Neoclassical form in 1834–1840.

In 1886, the town of Veselí was renamed Veselí nad Moravou. In 1887 and 1888, the railway to Brno and to Rohatec was built. In 1919, Veselí nad Moravou, Předměstí Veselí, and until then independent Jewish community merged into one whole. In 1950, Zarazice was annexed to the town, and in 1964, Milokošť was annexed. Both of these originally independent municipalities urbanistically fused with the town.

== Demographics ==
Historical population

Year	Pop.	±%
1869	4,677	—
1880	4,894	+4.6%
1890	5,120	+4.6%
1900	5,542	+8.2%
1910	5,676	+2.4%

Year	Pop.	±%
1921	5,795	+2.1%
1930	6,250	+7.9%
1950	6,237	−0.2%
1961	7,387	+18.4%
1970	10,512	+42.3%

Year	Pop.	±%
1980	12,464	+18.6%
1991	12,516	+0.4%
2001	12,256	−2.1%
2011	11,266	−8.1%
2021	10,355	−8.1%

Source: Censuses

== Transport ==
Veselí nad Moravou lies on an interregional railway line heading from Brno to Uherské Hradiště and on a regional line from Hodonín to Vrbovce, Slovakia.

== Sights ==
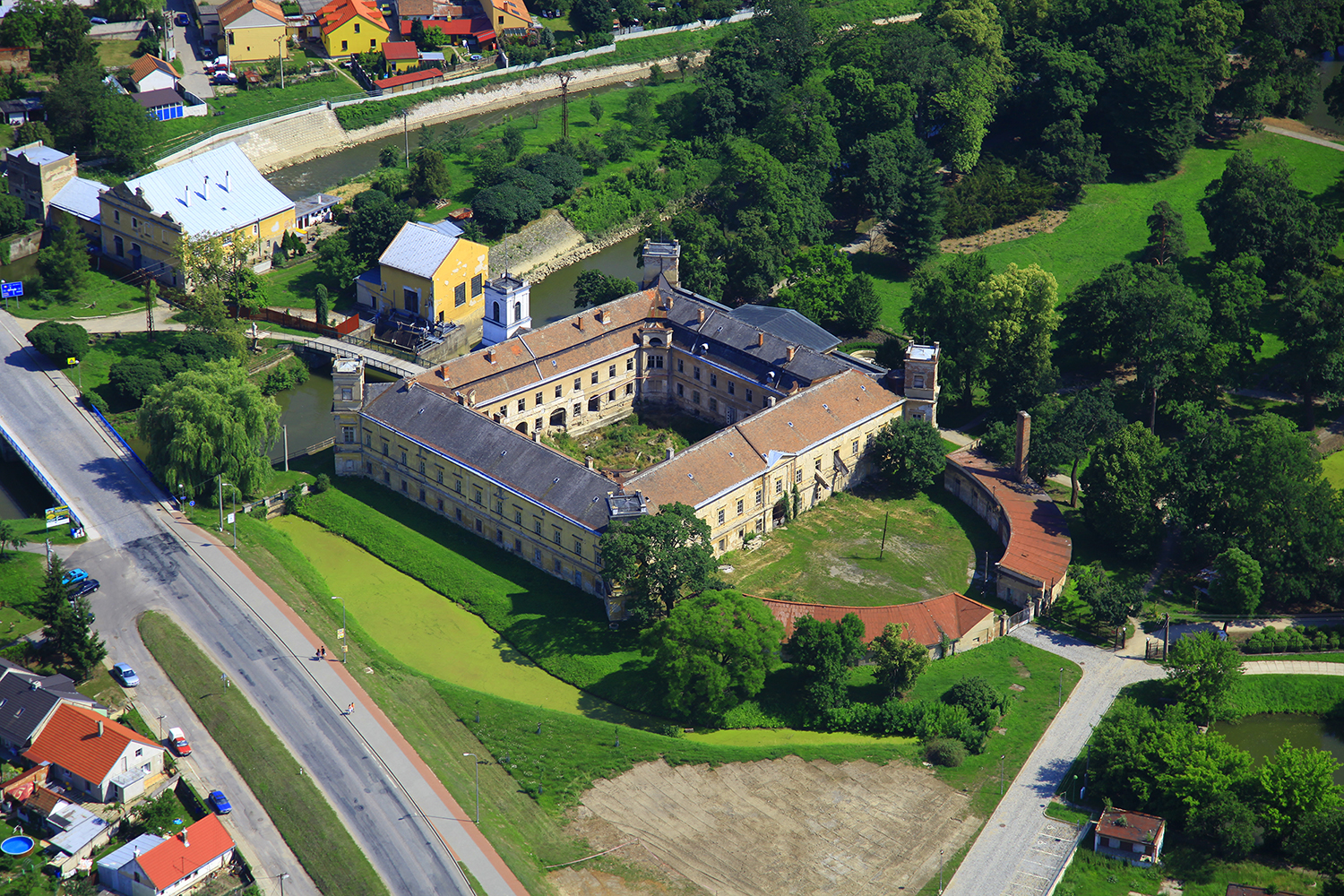
Veselí nad Moravou Castle

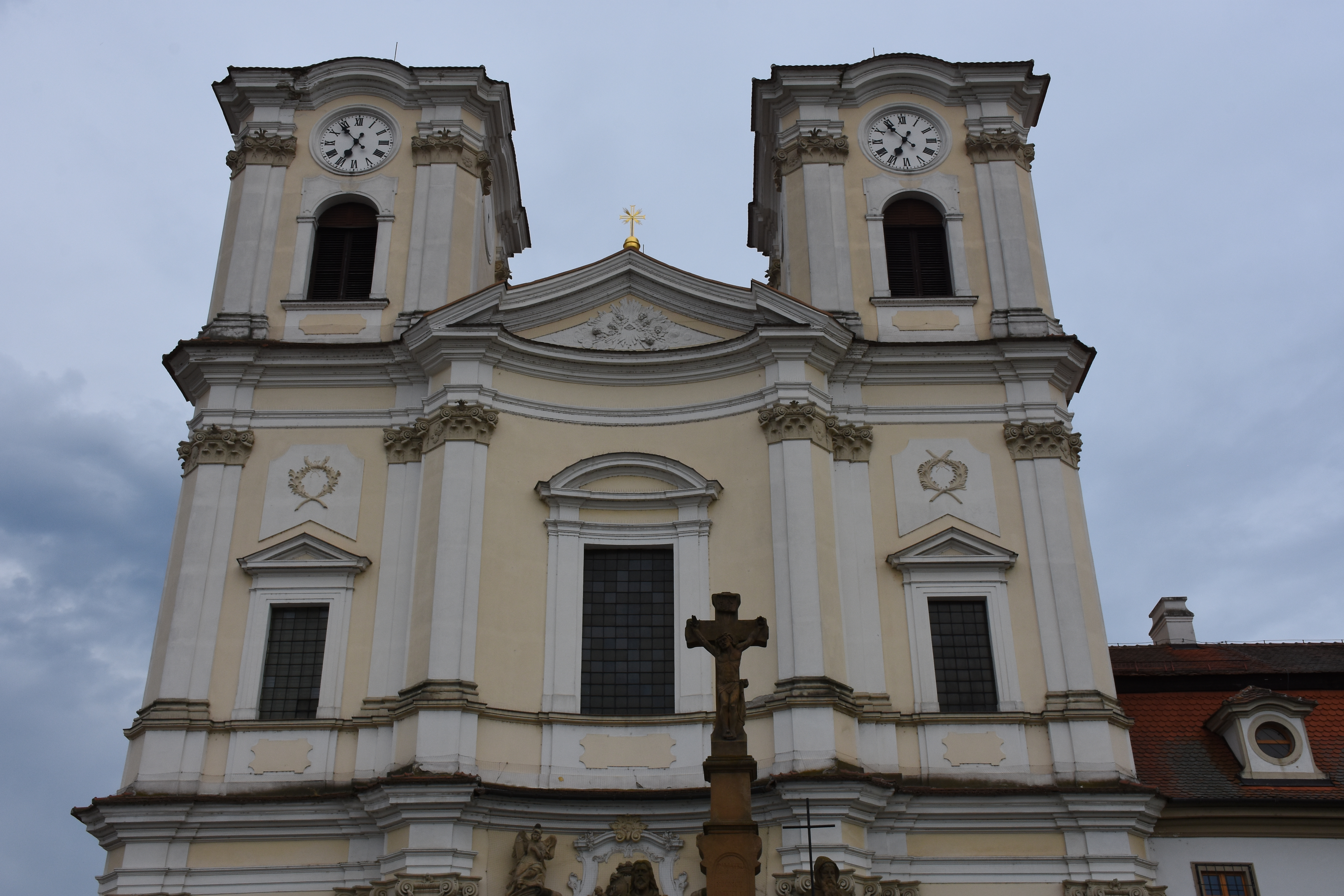
Church of the Holy Guardian Angels

The Veselí nad Moravou Castle was damaged in World War II and by subsequent insensitive use. It is gradually repaired and is not accessible to the public. Its part is a large park with a system of fishponds, which is freely accessible. In the park is a castle administration building from around 1800.

The historic centre is located on an island in the Morava River. It consists of the square Bartolomějské náměstí with the Church of Saint Bartholomew, built in 1733–1741, and with the Town Museum.

The former Servite monastery with the Church of the Holy Guardian Angels is a significant Baroque monument. The monastery was founded in 1714 and abolished in 1784. The construction of the church was finished in 1764. Part of the monastery buildings serves today as the town hall.

The Church of the Virgin Mary is the oldest church in Veselí nad Moravou. Preserved Romanesque-Gothic elements indicate that it was built in the third quarter of the 13th century.

Panský dvůr ('manor house') was originally a complex of farm buildings and large granary, built in 1646. The only preserved house served as an administrative building and today houses the regional tourist information centre, a small museum, an art gallery and cultural spaces.

== Notable people ==
- Fred Sersen (1890–1962), painter and cinema special effects artist
- Karel Benedík (1923–1997), painter; died here
- Milan Puzrla (1946–2021), cyclist

== Twin towns – sister cities ==
Veselí nad Moravou is twinned with:

- Crespellano (Valsamoggia), Italy
- Malacky, Slovakia
- Żnin, Poland
