= Thomas Buzzard =

Victorian English doctor

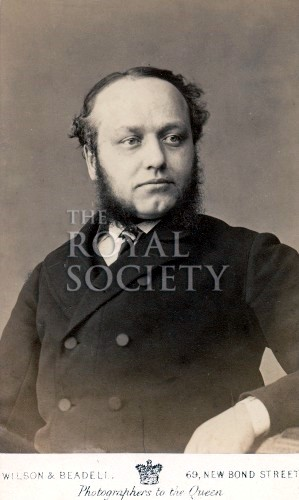
- Thomas Buzzard's carte-de-visite by Wilson & Beadell, New Bond Street, photographers to Queen Victoria.
- Born: 24 August 1831; London
- Died: 1 January 1919 (aged 87)
- Education: King's College School
- Occupation: Neurologist
- Spouse: Isabel Wass 1889
- Children: 6
- Father: G. Buzzard

Thomas Lovell Buzzard FRCP (24 August 1831 – 1 January 1919) was a Victorian English doctor who worked at the National Hospital, Queen Square. He was a pioneering neurologist who founded an epilepsy society and wrote also on Parkinson's disease. One of the last doctors to be trained through the apprenticeship route, Buzzard witnessed the Crimean War and later was a role model for the famous painting The Doctor.

== Early life ==
Buzzard was born in Cross Street, Hatton Garden, London on 24 August 1831. His father, George was a solicitor. After being educated at King's College School, Buzzard became apprentice to a doctor, before entering King's College Hospital and working for Sir William Fergusson as house surgeon.

== Early surgical career ==
Buzzard assisted in the 1854 cholera epidemic in Soho, London. In 1855, he joined the British medical staff with the Ottoman Army and was present at the Siege of Sevastopol. He was also a special correspondent in the Crimea for the Daily News. For this, he was honored with the Crimea Medal with clasp, the Order of the Medjidie, and the Turkish war medal.

== Neurology ==
Buzzard graduated as M.B, with the gold medal in surgery, in 1857, after returning from the Crimea. He spent the next six years in general practice in London and in contributing to the Daily News and the Lancet.

Recommended by John Hughlings Jackson, in 1867, Buzzard was appointed to the staff of the National Hospital for the Paralyzed and Epileptic. He is part responsible for the international reputation of ‘Queen Square’ .

In 1891 he wrote On the simulation of hysteria by organic disease of the nervous system, and articles on neurology and allied subjects for Quain's Dictionary of Medicine.

Buzzard also wrote on paralysis agitans, the first article on Parkinson's disease in the journal Brain. He is considered a pioneer in neurology.

The United Kingdom's largest epilepsy society, The National Society for Epilepsy was founded in Buzzard's home in London in 1892. Its first mission was to establish an agricultural community where people with epilepsy could live and work.

== Personal ==
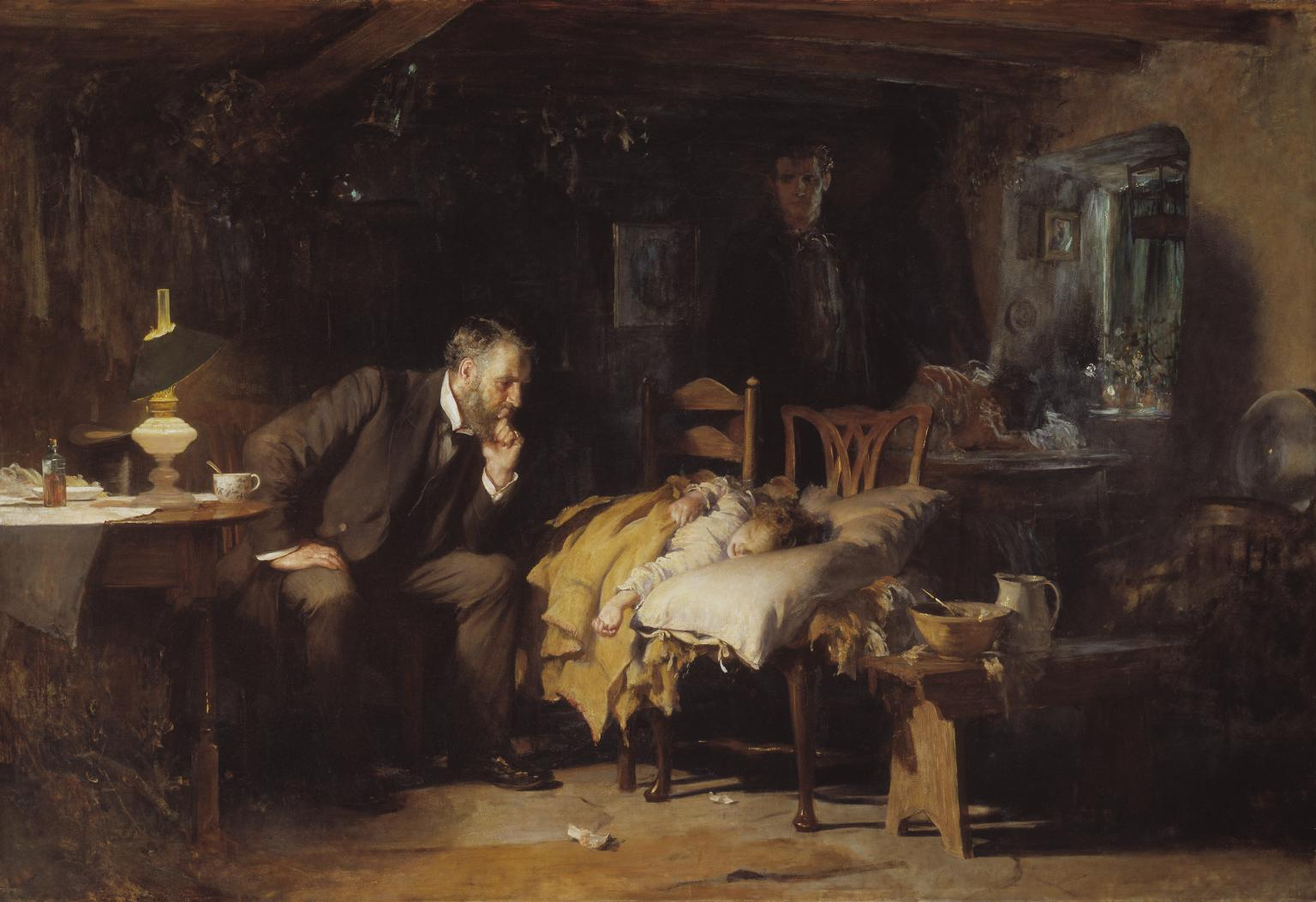
The Doctor, Luke Fildes, 1891. Oil-on-canvas, Tate Gallery, London.

From 1860 to 1867 Buzzard belonged to the Queen's Westminster Rifles. He liked to travel and to paint with water-colours. Many of his friends were leading artists. Luke Fildes painting The Doctor is closely connected with Buzzard.

He married Isabel Wass in 1889, daughter of Joseph Wass, a noted Lead Smelter, of Lea Green in Derbyshire, and had two daughters and four sons, including Sir Edward Farquhar Buzzard, 1st Baronet, FRCP, who followed in his footsteps as physician to the National Hospital. His other sons were in the army, Lt Col Charles Norman Buzzard DSO CMG, Royal Artillery, Brigadier General Frances Anstie Buzzard DSO, Archibald Dougan Buzzard and daughters, Louisa and Dorothy.

== Later life ==
Buzzard continued in practice until the age of seventy-nine, and published in his eighty-fifth year a book of his experiences in the Crimea. He died in London on 1 January 1919.

== Selected publications ==
- Clinical aspects of syphilitic nervous affections. J. & A. Churchill, London, 1874.
- Clinical Lectures on Diseases of the Nervous System. J. & A. Churchill, London, 1882.
- On some forms of paralysis from peripheral neuritis of gouty, alcoholic, diphtheritic, and other origin. J. & A. Churchill, London, 1886.
- On the simulation of hysteria by organic disease of the nervous system. J. & A. Churchill, London, 1891.
- With the Turkish Army in the Crimea and Asia Minor: A personal narrative. John Murray, London, 1915.
