= Marshal of the Island of Trinidad =

The Marshal of the Island of Trinidad was an official of the British colonial government on Trinidad. The marshal was appointed by the British monarch but subordinate to the governor. The position was created by Ordnance No. 1 - 1838, to carry out the duties previously undertaken by the alguacil mayor of the island.

== Marshals of Trinidad ==
(This list is incomplete)

- Anthony Browne Johnston Clogstoun, 1840–1851.
- Edward Murray, 1851–1874.
