= Baťa Canal =

Canal on the Morava river, Czech Republic

Coordinates: 48°57′24″N 17°22′39″E

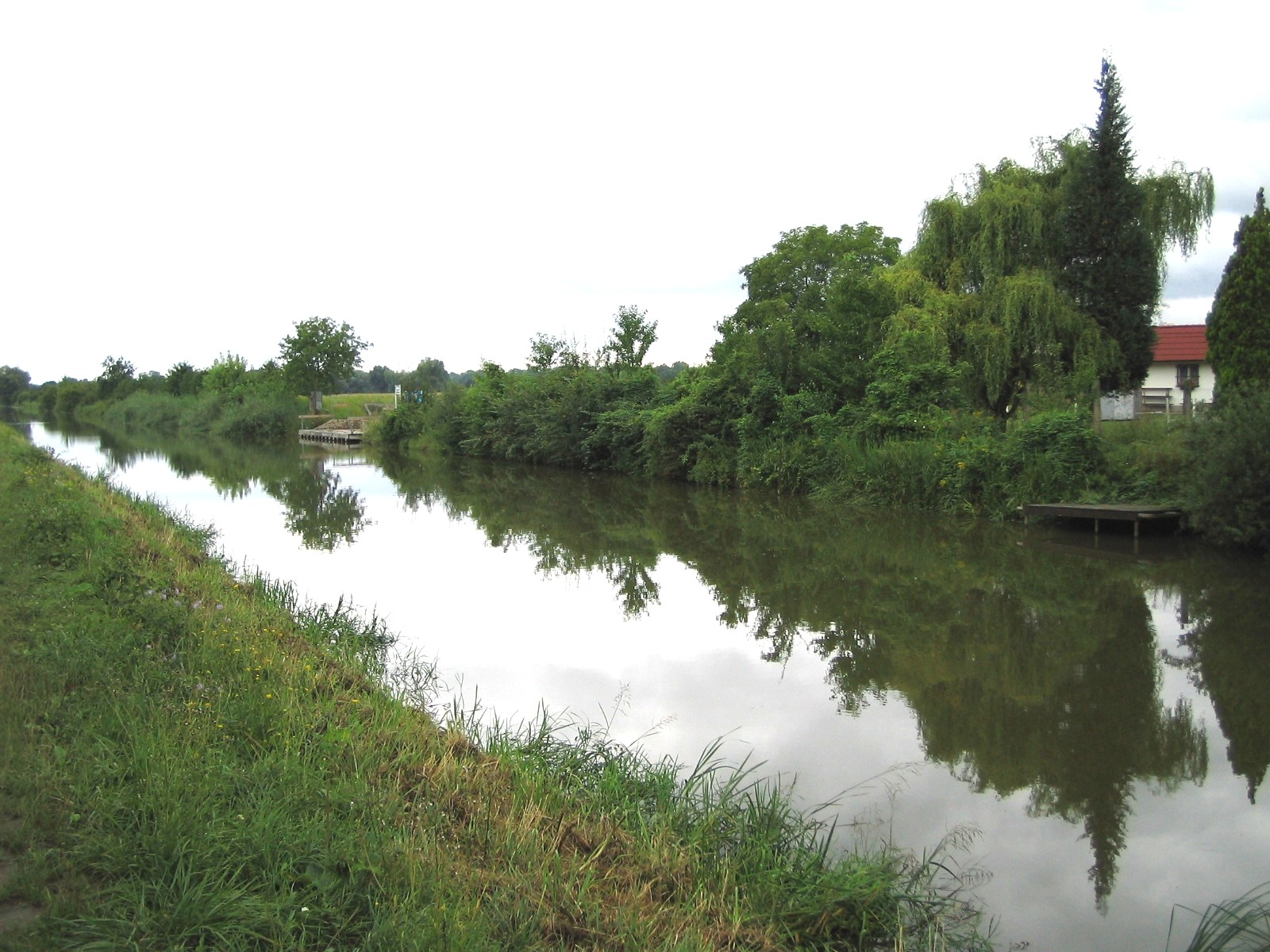
Baťa Canal near town of Strážnice.

Baťa Canal (Czech: Baťův kanál; Průplav Otrokovice-Rohatec) is a navigable canal on the Morava river in the Czech Republic. The water canal was built during 1934-1938 and today it serves mainly for recreational cruises.

== History ==
Reasons for building the canal were two: an attempt to increase the level of groundwater after the Morava river was regulated and as an initial phase of long planned but never realized Danube-Oder-Canal.

The immediate reason for the construction was the need to transfer lignite from mine in Ratíškovice to the Otrokovice power plant. Both were owned by Bata Shoes (Baťovy závody) and the company was the main investor (the rest was paid for by the state). Construction started on 16 October 1934 and finished during autumn 1938. The canal was financed by Jan Antonín Baťa in cooperation with the Czechoslovak state.

== Technical details ==
The route is 51.8 km long, of which 27 km fall to the Morava river, 1 km to the Dřevnice river and 24 km is artificial canal. The difference in water levels is 18.6 m.

In total 33 bridges spanned over the canal. The canal had 14 canal locks. Some parts of the technical infrastructure were quite unique at the time of construction.

== Canal today ==
During World War II, the canal was severely damaged and only partially repaired (repairs lasted until 1949). Its use for transportation declined, and in 1972, it was officially abandoned.

In 1995, the route was reopened for sightseeing tours. After repairs, 13 canal locks are now accessible. The canal became the most popular tourist destination of the region. It is also used for transportation of industrial goods, and plans exist to extend it downstream to the border of Slovakia.

== Literature ==
- Baťův kanál – od myšlenky k nápadu, collection of authors, Povodí Moravy, 2018 ISBN 978-80-907141-0-6.
