= The Doctor (painting) =

Painting by Luke Fildes

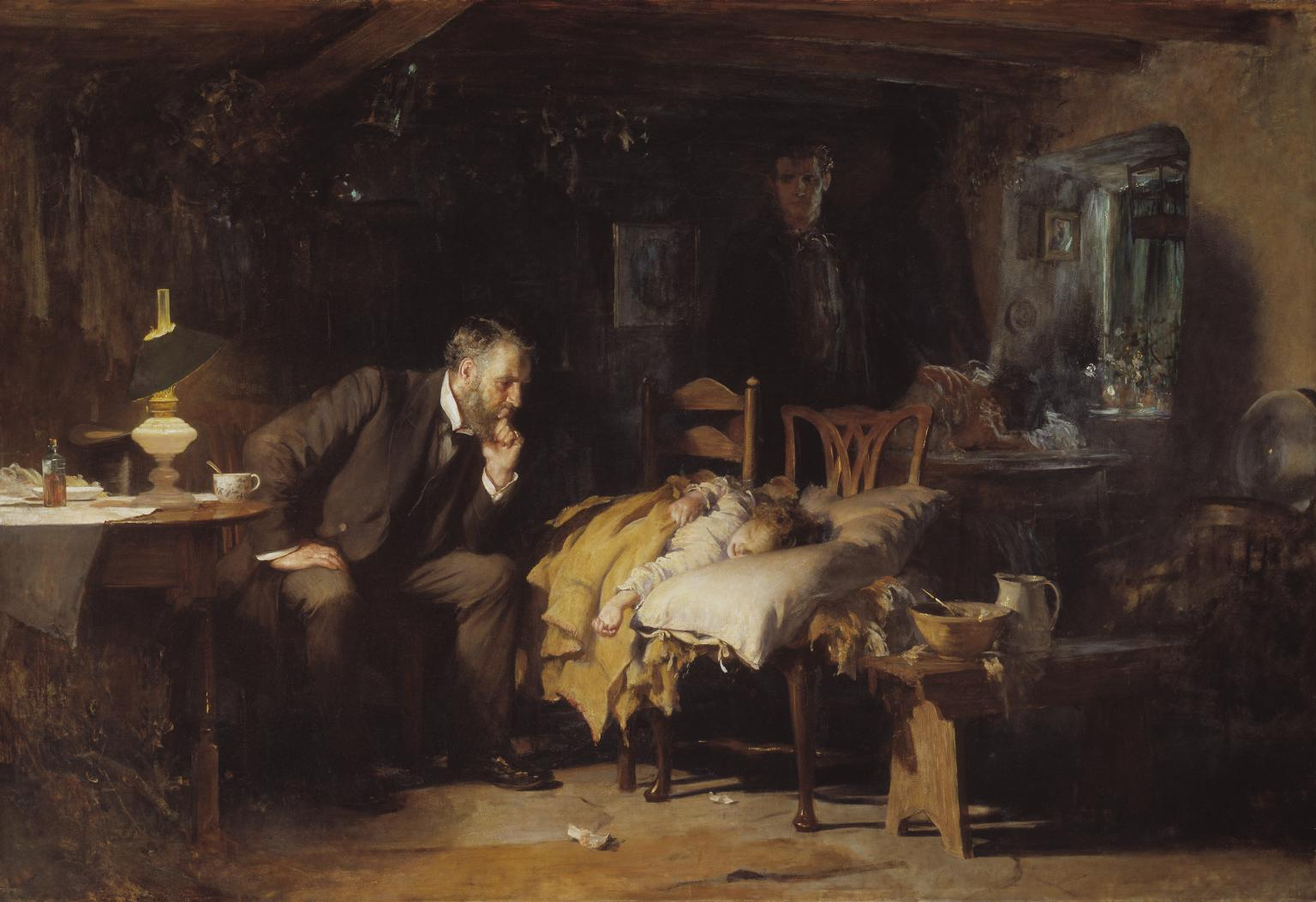
- Artist: Luke Fildes
- Year: 1891
- Medium: Oil on canvas
- Dimensions: 166 cm × 242 cm (65 in × 95 in)
- Location: Tate Gallery, London

The Doctor is an 1891 painting by Luke Fildes that depicts a Victorian physician observing the critical stage in a child's illness while the parents gaze on helplessly from the periphery. It has been used to portray the values of the ideal physician and the inadequacies of the medical profession.

Different theories exist as to the painting's origin but it is most likely based upon Fildes' own experience of the death of his son. Critics have noted that Fildes omitted common medical equipment of his era in order to focus on the relationship between physician and patient.

== Origins ==
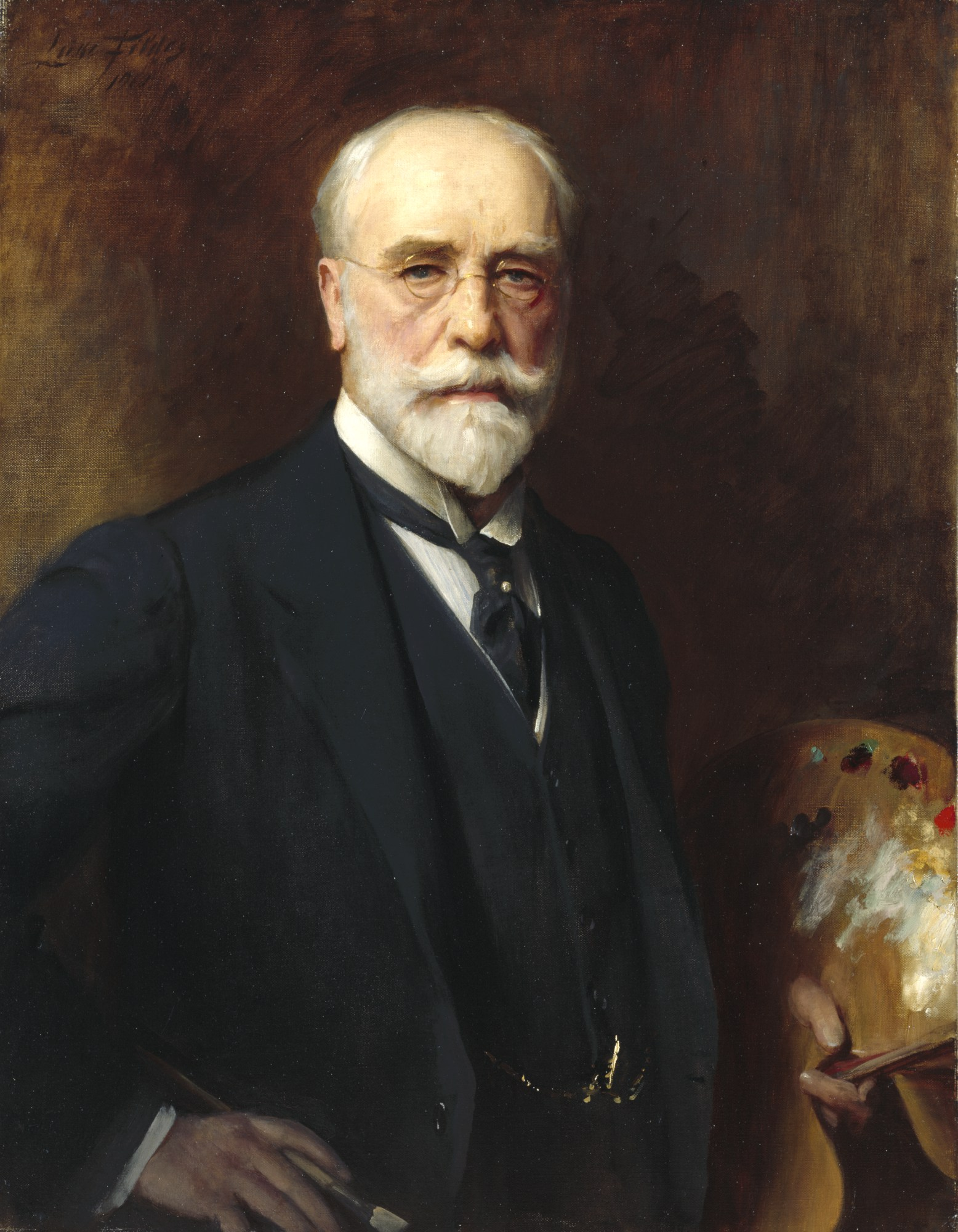
Self-portrait, Luke Fildes, 1911. Royal Academy of Arts, London.

The painting was commissioned by Henry Tate in 1890 as a work of "social realism" on a topic of Fildes' choosing to be displayed in the National Gallery of British Art, now known as the Tate Gallery London. Fildes was paid £3,000 for the work, a sum he felt was too small for such a painting and less than he expected for painting portraits. Two Victorian doctors, Thomas Buzzard (neurologist) and Gustavus Murray (obstetrician), have been particularly associated with the painting, as has the genre of the period in which it was painted. Fildes had the particular desire "to put on record the status of the doctor in our time".

Different theories exist as to the origins of the painting.

=== Fildes' personal loss ===
The most important personal influence was probably the death of Fildes' first child, his one-year-old son, Philip, from typhoid fever on Christmas morning, 1877. Fildes' biographer has described how the boy's death compelled Fildes to paint a picture revolving around the compassionate Dr Murray visiting his dying child. The story was confirmed later by Fildes' second son, who described this as Fildes' "quickest painted of his 'big' pictures".

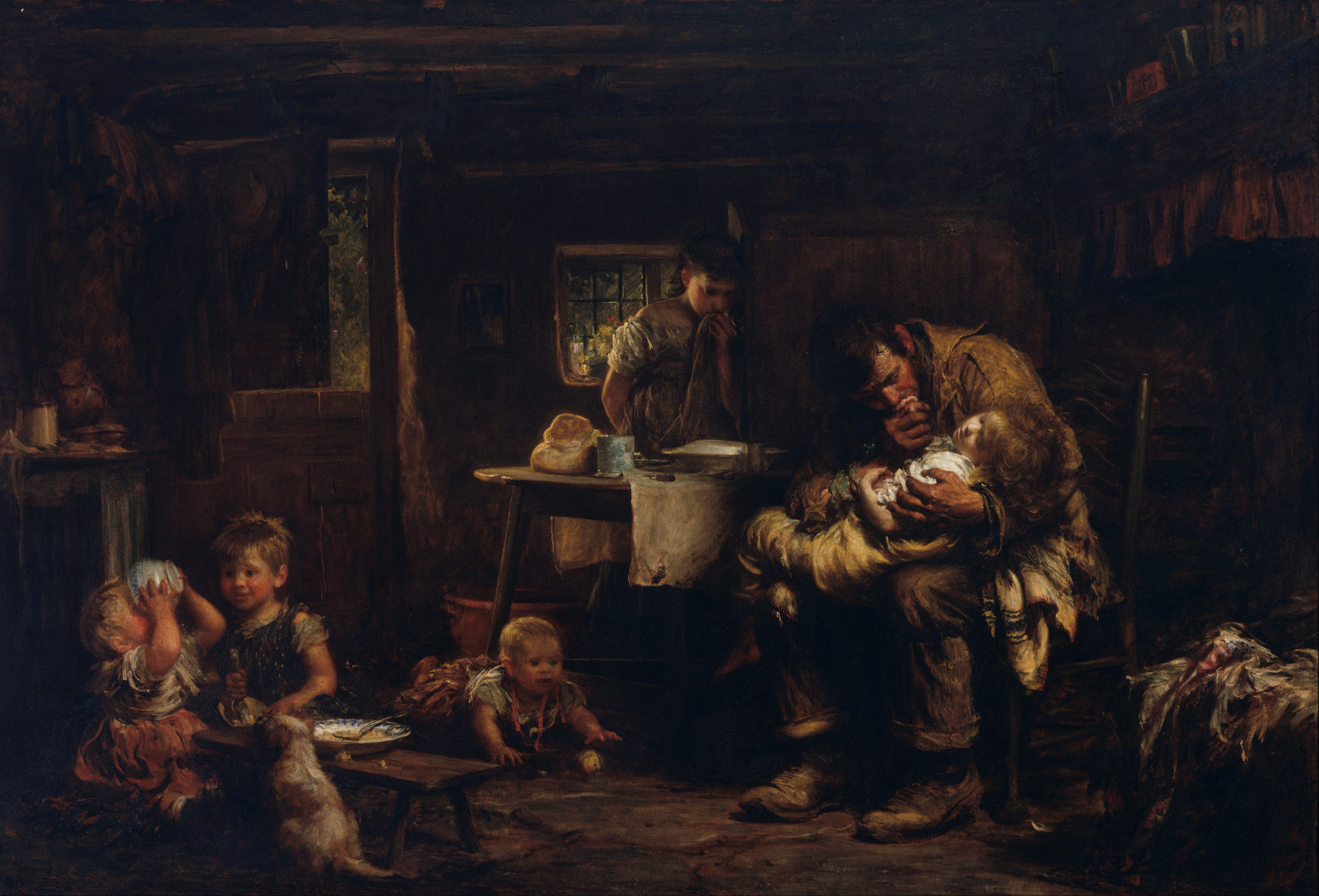
The Widower, Luke Fildes, 1876. A precursor of The Doctor.

=== Fildes' experiences ===
Documentation of Fildes' work with the homeless reveals that a child was once brought into the studio by a labourer, a scenario which prompted the painting The Widower (1876). This painting included many features later seen in The Doctor.

Fildes most likely modelled the characters in the painting on his own family and himself. Observing photographs of himself, Fildes guided his models, who were frequently his friends. His daughter was likely the prototype of the sick child, and a professional model was used for the mother. The child's resting hand and extended arm may have been drawn from Fildes' older son. Despite reports that doctors visited Fildes in the hope of being used as models, the final painting of the doctor resembles Fildes himself.

Paying tribute to his family origins in the fishing industry, Fildes adds a fishing net hanging from the ceiling. His father was a mariner and shipping agent.

=== On Queen Victoria's orders ===
The cottage setting has led some to believe that the painting was ordered by Queen Victoria to honour her own physician, Sir James Clark. This alternative account also originates in the story about her physician being sent to Balmoral to care for the sick child of a servant. This account, however, is simply groundless because not a single contemporary reviewer mentioned this episode when the picture was first exhibited in 1891 at the Royal Academy in London and Fildes himself made no mention of Queen Victoria in his several interviews concerning the painting.

=== Social context ===
18th and 19th century concerns by society of the rise of scientific medicine also could have possibly influenced the format of the painting.

== Composition ==
=== Preparation ===
The painting was first exhibited in 1891. Prior to completion, a number of sketches were made which are preserved at the Tate Gallery and depict various alternative compositions such as the doctor being on the right side of the canvas, the child seated rather than lying down, and different facial expressions for the doctor. Fildes built a model cottage to copy after visiting numerous cottages in north-east Scotland, ensuring that the picture included authentic detail of roof rafters, tablecloth, lampshade, and lighting. Particular attention was paid to ensuring the room had a poor, Victorian, multi-purpose appearance.

=== Doctor and patient ===
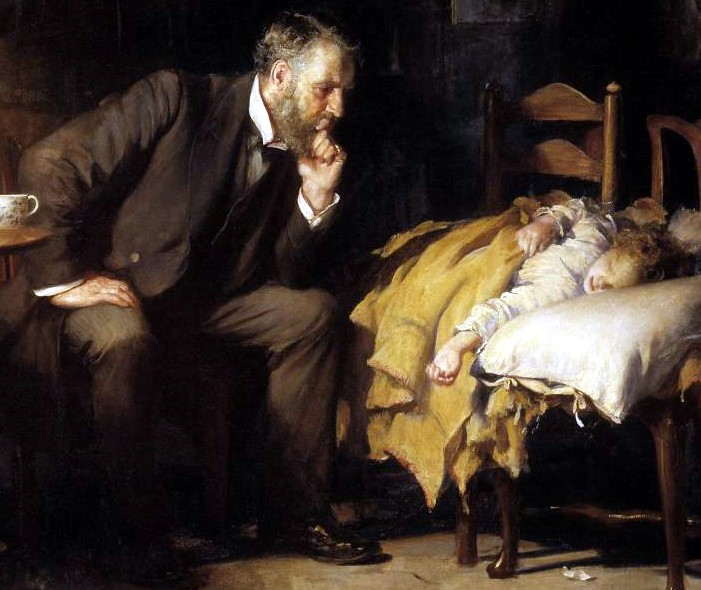
Detail of the doctor and patient

The focus of the picture is the worried but sympathetic physician and the sick child, with everything else in the shadows. The child had experienced a 'crisis', the critical stage of a potentially life-threatening illness. The 'dawn' light through the window, represents recovery and hope as the child survived the night.

The concentrated focus of the doctor on the child shows the patient as a person and individual and the doctor as a compassionate carer with empathy for the patient's suffering. In 2002, Douglas wrote in the British Medical Journal, "So his manner is all, and Fildes captures it forever: the furrowed brow; the hand propping the firm bearded chin; the calm, concerned authority".

=== Parents ===
The parents are insignificant, helpless, and not central to the picture. A father gives support to his wife by extending his arm and resting his hand on her shoulder. She appears to be crying and possibly praying. He, however, is also helpless and peers on at the doctor and child.

=== Lighting and room ===
The artificial light from the lamp on the table and the natural rising sunlight beginning to shine through the single window suggest that the doctor has been in attendance all night. A distressed, poor, and modest family is depicted by one small carpet and the washing suspended in a small room. Two mismatched chairs, pressed together, construct a makeshift bed in the labourer's cottage. A couple of scrunched up papers lie on the floor, "most probably a filled prescription" which has been frustratingly discarded. An easily missed medicine bottle is placed in the shadow of the lamp and in close proximity to the doctor and his control, not the parents'.

== Accuracy ==
Fildes stated that his choice of subject was "to put on record the status of the doctor in our own time", but his depiction of 19th-century healthcare is not entirely accurate. There is no stethoscope, microscope, sphygmomanometer, or thermometer in the picture, well-known instruments of physicians in the late 19th century which saved time. It may be that these instruments were omitted in order to show the doctors' "professional and personal commitment". Fildes does include a pestle and mortar, and a cup and a spoon, equipment used before the scientific era of medicine.

It has also been pointed out that it was unlikely that a Victorian physician would make an overnight home visit to a poor family, such services being available only to the middle class and the wealthy.

== Reception and legacy ==
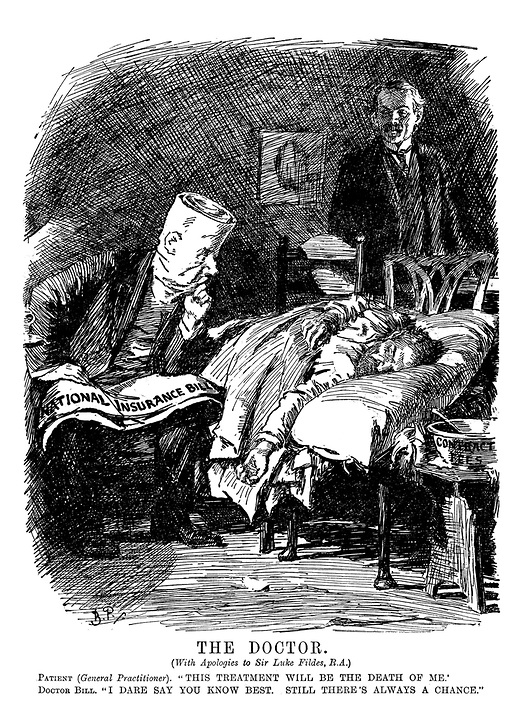
The Doctor used ironically in a 1911 Punch cartoon by Bernard Partridge commenting on the effects of the National Insurance Act 1911

The painting caught the public's attention and toured Britain. Received with a striking admiration, there is one report of an observer who, overwhelmed at the painting, died on the spot. The work is considered one of the most famous depictions of the practice of medicine and has been described as "iconic". It epitomises an idyllic kind of medicine, and has often been used to illustrate the virtues of a good doctor and the inadequacies of the medical profession.

Subsequently, the painting received comments including this by surgeon W. Mitchell Banks: "What do we not owe to Mr. Fildes for showing to the world the typical doctor as we would all like him to be shown – an honest man and a gentle man, doing his best to relieve suffering?" He continued: "A library of books written in your honour would not do what this picture has done and will do for the medical profession in making the hearts of our fellow men warm to us with confidence and affection".

Seen today as "Victorian spin" by some, in its time the depiction of the doctor as a hero serving the poor raised the status of the medical profession during a period when public opinion was critical of the increasingly impersonal nature of medicine.

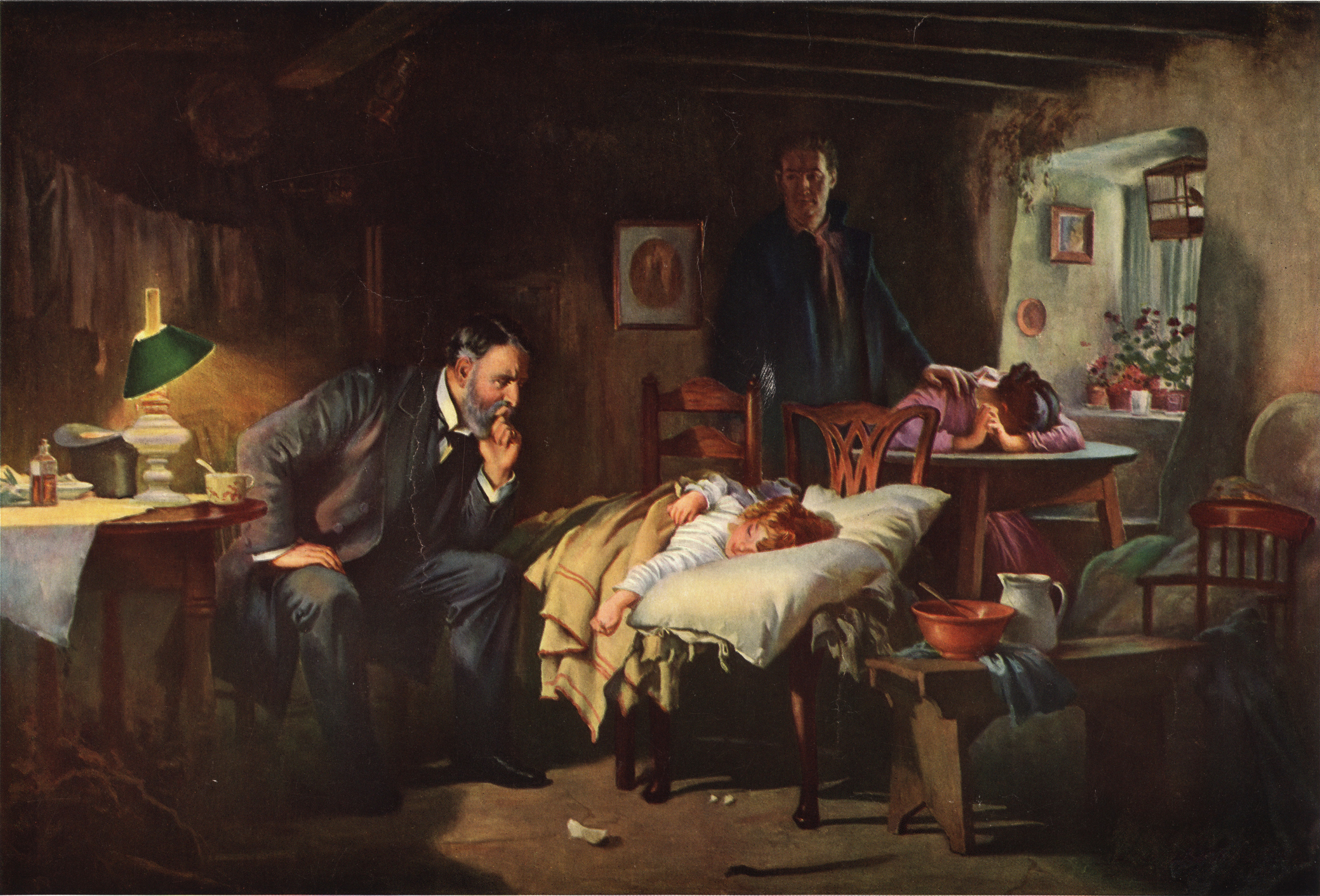
The Doctor, after Luke Fildes, Joseph Tomanek, 1933

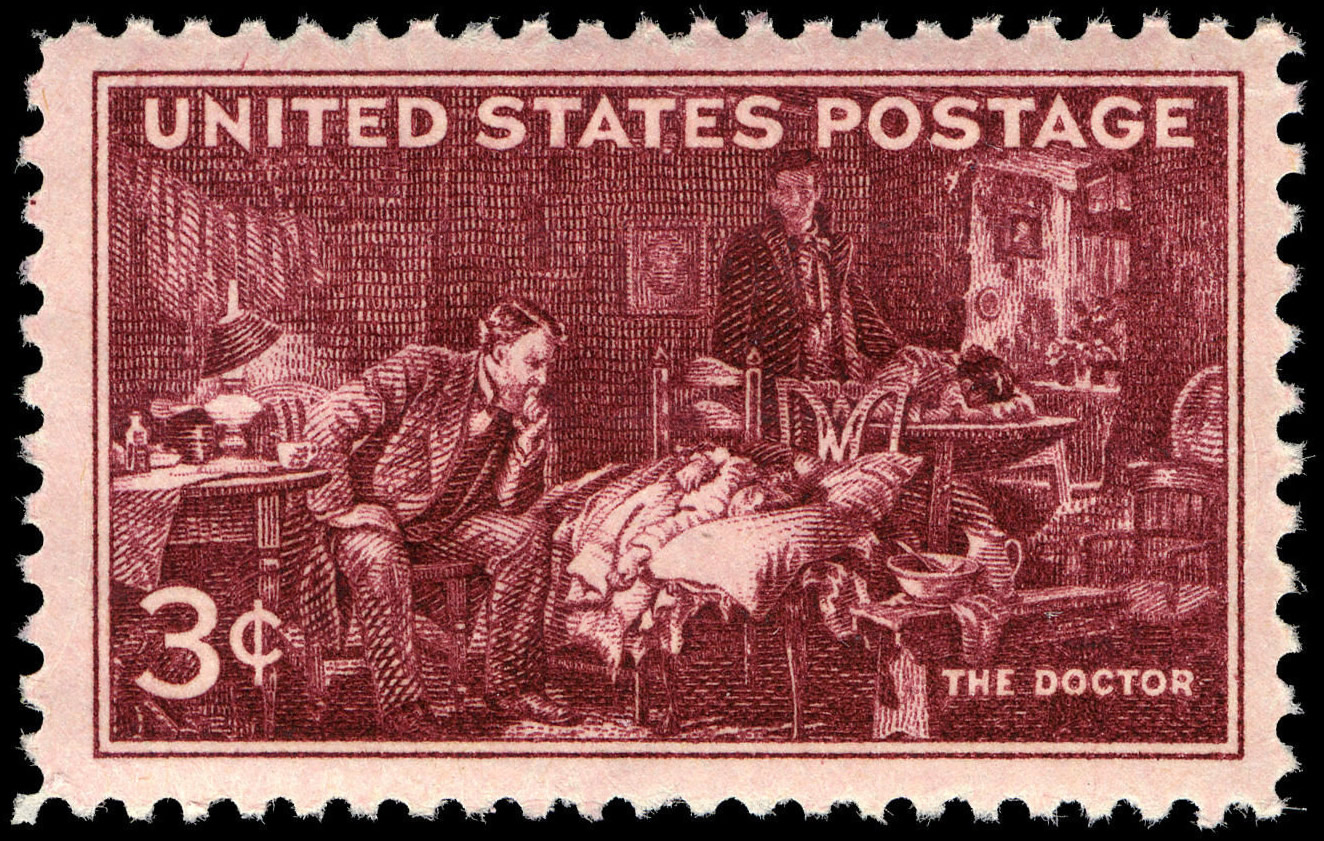
AMA Centennial stamp of the United States, 1947

The painting has inspired poetry and film. In 1911 it featured in a Punch cartoon commenting satirically on the effect of the National Insurance Act 1911 on doctors. In 1933, the American artist Joseph Tomanek painted a version of the painting making small changes to the composition. In 1947 it was reproduced on a United States postage stamp for the centenary of the American Medical Association, which in 1949 used it in their campaign against nationalised medical care as proposed by President Harry S. Truman. The image was printed on 65,000 posters and brochures with the slogan, "Keep Politics Out of this Picture". This has been described as contributing to public distrust of nationalised medical care in the United States. By contrast, in Britain it was used as the emblem for a celebration of Britain's National Health Service.

In 1933, a sculpture of the scene in the painting was made using the "life-size, life-like, new art form" of sculpticolor and displayed at the Petrolagar laxative exhibit in the Hall of Science at the Chicago Century of Progress exhibition. It was cast from a model made by the sculptor John Paulding and then painted by Rudolph F. Ingerle, the entire work measuring 15 feet (4.6 m) in length, 11 feet (3.4 m) in height, and 9 feet (2.7 m) in depth. Publicity stated that "The Doctor impressively emphasizes the ideal relationship between physician and patient - 'The Human Touch'".

As late as 1951, the painting was used in advertising for Wyeth pharmaceuticals, which repeated the story that Queen Victoria commissioned it, adding: "the pictured child recovered despite the inadequacies of her humble home–a tribute to her doctor's genius and to the progress of medical science".

Since the mid-1990s, the medical humanities journals The Lancet and the British Medical Journal have revived interest in the painting, stimulating discussion about the role of the doctor. Debate on the role and status of doctors has led to the inclusion of medical humanities in medical schools, where this painting has been used as a teaching aid for medical students.

The reason for the painting's popularity has been much debated. The universal sentiment associated with a doctor tending to a sick child appears simple. Ultimately, it is likely that The Doctor was hailed as iconic due to the wish to be cared for with single-minded attentiveness.
