= Moravian folk music =

Music from the Moravian region of Czechia

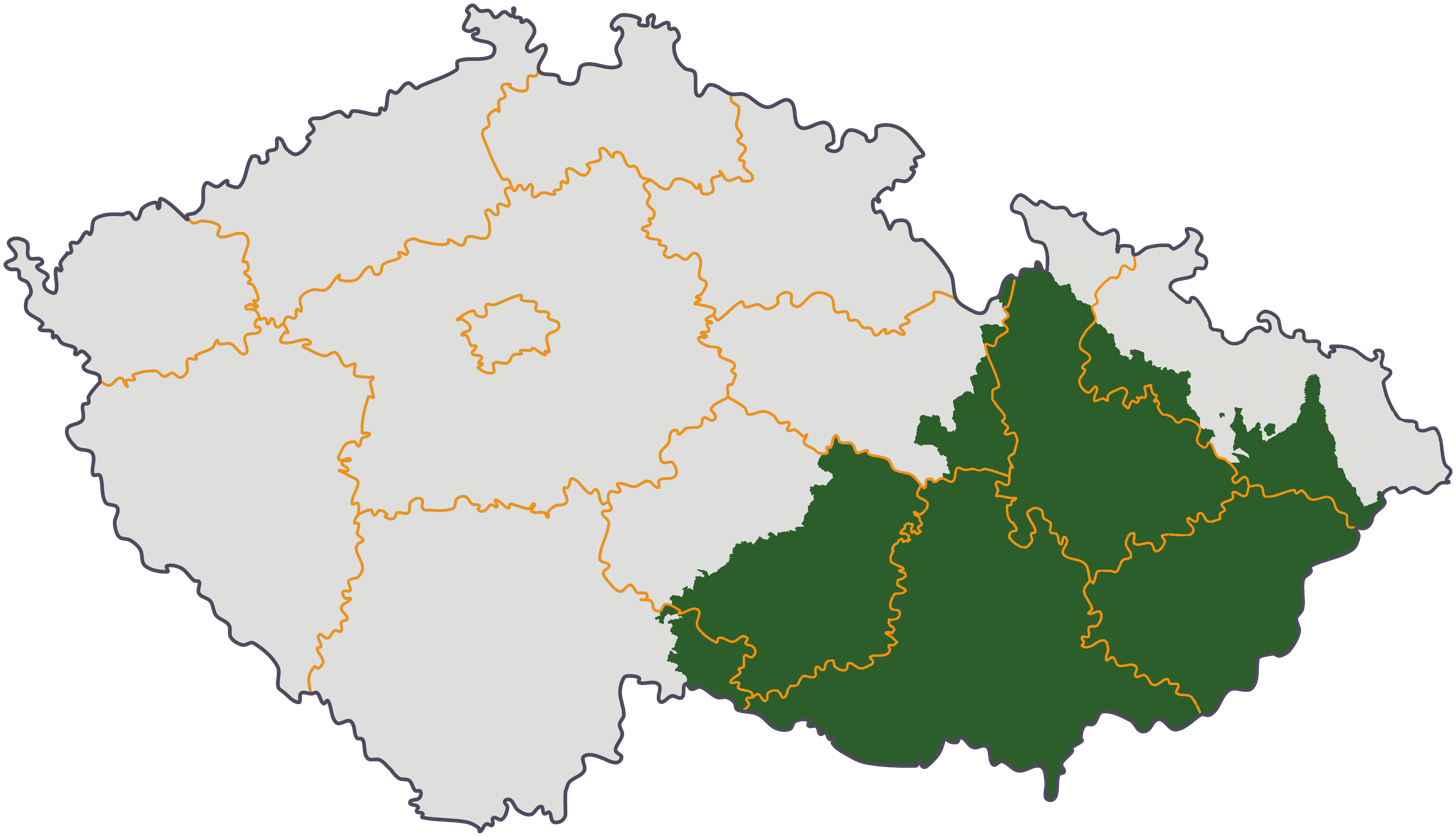
Moravia within the Czech Republic

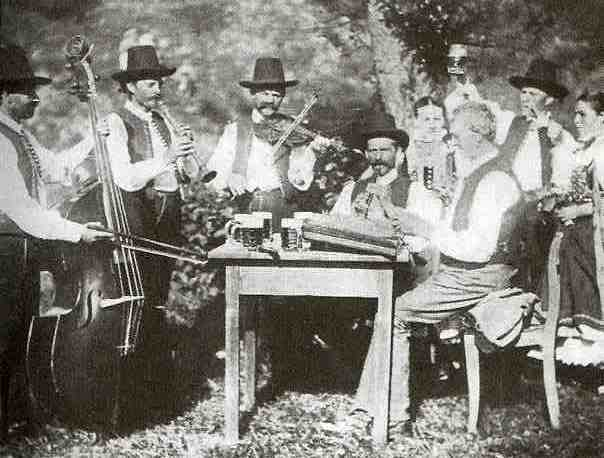
Folk musicians from Kunčice, Moravia (1890s)

Moravian traditional music or Moravian folk music represents a part of the European musical culture connected with the Moravian region of the Czech Republic. Styles of Moravian traditional music vary by location and subject, but much of it is characterized by a specific melodic and harmonic texture related to the Eastern European musical world. According to Czech musicologist Jiří Plocek, Moravia is the area where the European East musically meets the West.

Moravian folk bands are mainly centered on a string section and a large cimbalom, which are often complemented by other instruments. Moravian traditional music influenced Czech classical composers, such as Antonín Dvořák, Bedřich Smetana and Leoš Janáček, who was at the forefront of the Moravian folklore movement. Towards the end of the 20th century, Moravian folk music had a noticeable influence on the Czech jazz scene, and folk songs have been adapted into rock bands' repertoires. Today, there are many festivals still held throughout Moravia with performances from traditional bands and dance ensembles.

== History ==
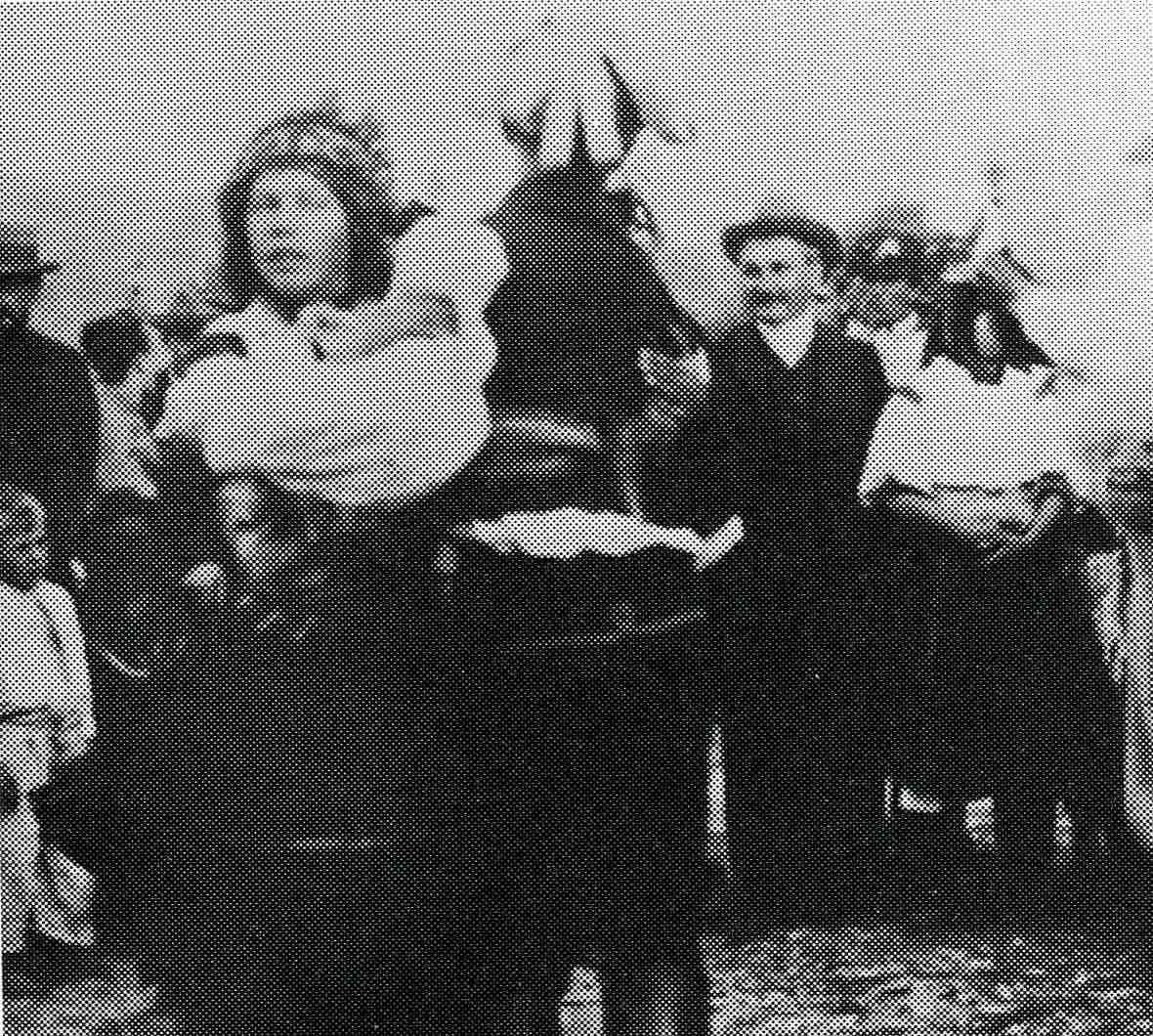
Leoš Janáček collecting folksongs on 19 August 1906 in Strání

Moravia, today a part of the Czech Republic, was settled by Slavic tribes in the 6th century. Today, however, little is known about this period. Following the decline of Great Moravia in the 9th and 10th centuries, Moravia was captured by the Přemyslid dynasty and became a part of the Bohemian Kingdom. During the medieval war-invasions, exotic armies of Turks and Tatars came to the region. Echoes of these dramatic events can be found in the lyrics of Moravian folk songs. Distinct styles of folk music began to emerge during the Wallachian colonization of the 16th and 17th centuries, separating Bohemian and Moravian traditional music. The "new Hungarian" style has influenced the music of the area in the past three centuries, especially in Southern Moravia. This influence has left a deep imprint on the unusual melodic variegation of Moravian traditional music providing an inspirational source for subsequent Classical, Jazz and Pop music composers.

The Czech National Revival in the 19th century represented an important turning point for traditional music. The "Gubernial Collecting Action" at the beginning of the 19th century was responsible for documenting folk music of the entire Austro-Hungarian Empire. Later, in 1835, the priest František Sušil (1804–1868) published Moravské národní písně (Moravian National Songs), the founding collection of Moravian folk songs. The second important collector of folk songs was the dialectologist and folklorist František Bartoš (1837–1906), who published his collection Nové národní písně moravské s nápěvy do textu vřaděnými (New Moravian National Songs with Melodies Integrated to Text) in 1882. He closely collaborated with Czech composer Leoš Janáček who later became the leader of the Moravian folklore movement and organized the first phonograph recordings of Moravian folk music; these represent the oldest documentation of Moravian folk music. Janáček's written collection of Moravian love-songs (Moravské písně milostné) was published in 1930, after his death. Many other valuable regional folk-song collections were also published during this time and collecting activities continued through the second half of the 20th century. Today tens of thousands of folk songs from Moravia are archived in the Ethnographic Division of the Academy of Sciences of the Czech Republic.

== Main characteristics ==
The traditional music of Western Moravia is closely related to the music of Bohemia. It was influenced by folk music of Germany and other western regions as well as classical music, especially in the Baroque and Classical eras. The music is mainly written in major keys, and its rhythm and structure are regular and firm.

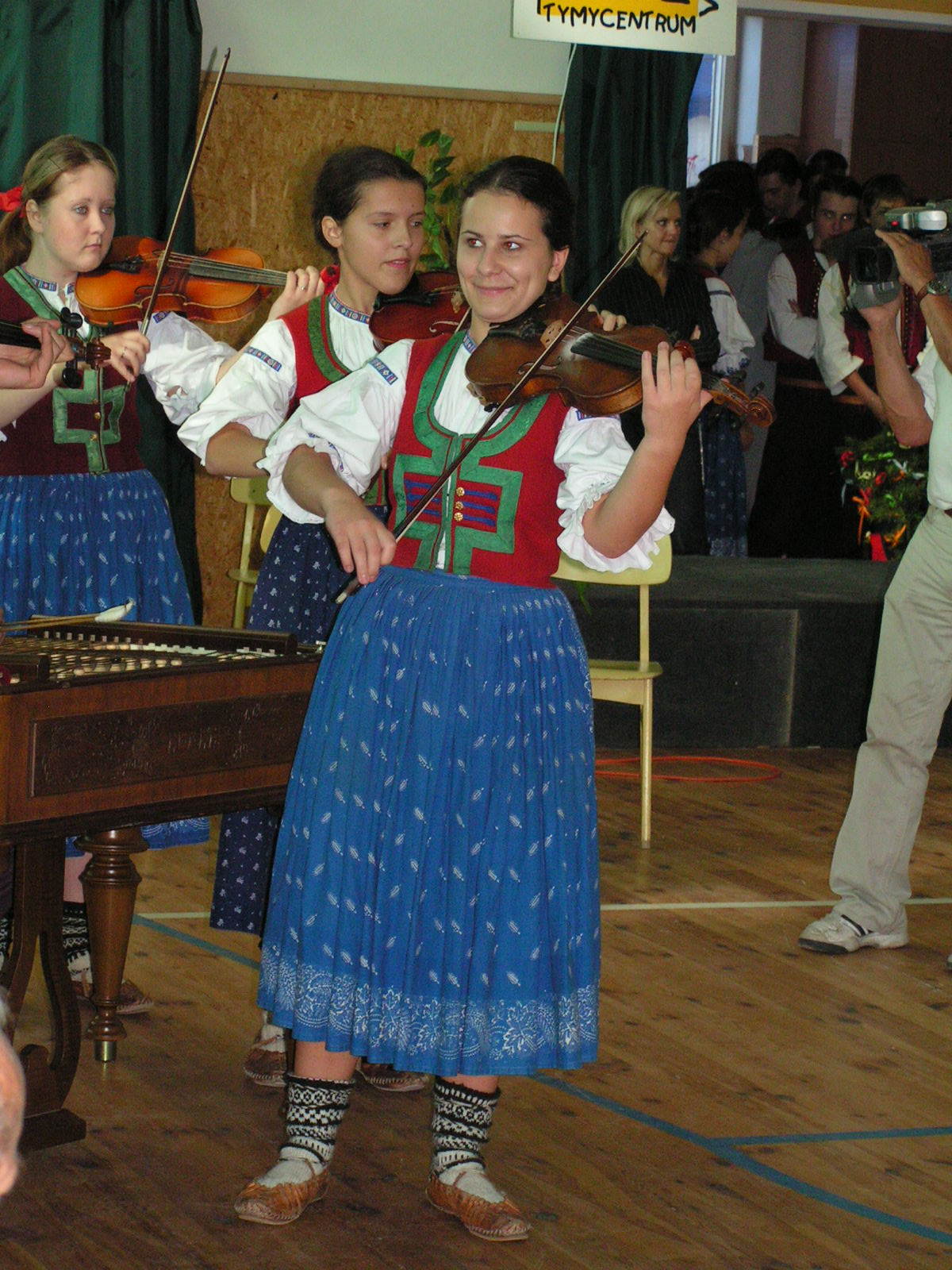
Cimbalom band of the folklore ensemble Malá Rusava.

The music of Southeastern Moravia differs substantially. Its character is closely related to the musical style of Eastern Europe using rather minor keys and melodic elements characteristic of eastern countries such as Ukraine, Slovakia, Romania and Hungary. Here it is also possible to find elements of gypsy scales which contain augmented intervals unusual for the traditional music of Western Europe. One of the most important elements of the traditional music of Southeastern Moravia is emotional variegation and greater rhythmic leeway.

Moravian folk music performances use various traditional and characteristic instruments. "Cimbalom bands" are among the most visible and iconic ensembles that perform traditional music today. The "small" cimbalom characteristic of Moravian music in the 19th century, however, has been replaced by the "standard" (or Hungarian) cimbalom, a rather new instrument only gaining wide use in the 20th century. The leader and "conductor" of the cimbalom band is often a violinist, called "primáš" in Czech, who plays the leading melody with ornamentation. A second violinist, "obligát", often plays the plain melody and supports the "primáš". The harmonic variety of the string instruments is often supported also by other violinists or violists. They are called "terc" as they usually play a third lower than the leading melody or "kontry", playing accompaniments. Other important instruments of the Moravian cimbalom band are clarinet, ornamenting the melody, and double bass.

Moravian folk bands often perform in various line-ups as some types of songs require specific instrumental accompaniment. For example, "hudecké" songs only require a string section. The traditional line-up of hudecká muzika (string band) consists of fiddle (prim), viola (kontra) and bass. Bagpipes, gajdy in Moravian dialects, are integral to the fabric of "gajdošská muzika", often accompanied by violin (prim), viola (kontra) and double bass. Removing some typical violin features lead to the origin of an instrument nicknamed the squeaking fiddle in the former Bohemian-German area of the Jihlava region. This type of homemade "folk fiddle" is the leading instrument of skřipkařská muzika ("squeaking fiddle band"). Other songs may require unusual instruments such as simple whistles, pipes, flutes and recorders, hurdy-gurdy and jaw harps.

Moravian traditional folk songs are separated into various specific types, of which the most famous is probably the verbuňk, the specific male recruit dance of Moravian Slovakia. Koichiro Matsuura, the General-Director of UNESCO in 2005 proclaimed the Moravian verbuňk as the part of the Intangible Cultural Heritage of Mankind.

=== Types of Moravian folk songs ===
- Love songs – the most numerous category dealing with feelings of love in various forms (joyous songs, sad songs)
- Wedding songs
- Recruitment and army songs – including, for example, songs relating to the Battle of Austerlitz

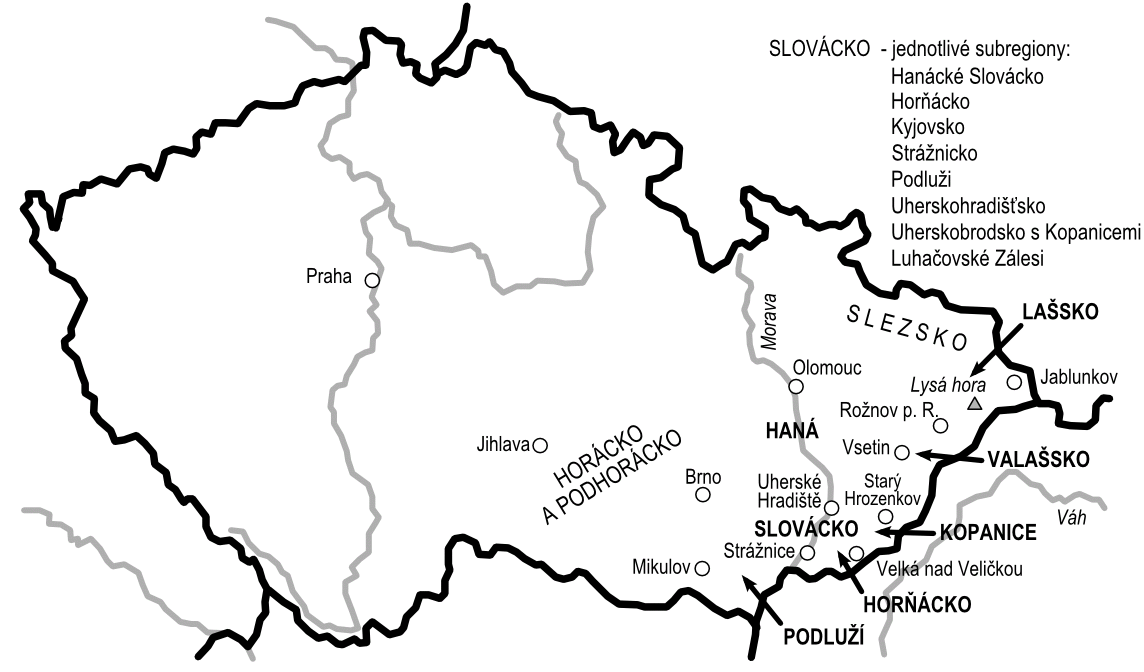
Map of Moravian ethnographic regions

- Pastoral songs (in Czech: pastevecké písně)
- Jocular songs – with ironic and sharp remarks focusing on human weaknesses
- Drinking songs – in praise of the scent and flavour of wine and spirits; poking fun at those who drink too much
- Ceremonial songs – carnival songs, work songs, dance songs, carols
- Funeral choir songs – This form has survived only in the Horňácko Region.

== Moravian ethnographic regions ==
Moravia is ethnographically divided into approximately ten regions, some of which, Dolňácko for example, are divided further into subregions.

- Central and western Moravia – The traditional music of this large area is oriented rather to Bohemian folk culture.
- Northeastern Moravia – Closer to the Carpathian circle of folk culture, the region is influenced by Slovak and Polish culture.
- Southeastern Moravia (southeast of Brno) – This area has many different ethnographic regions collectively known as Slovácko (Moravian Slovakia). The regions and subregions also encompass the districts of Hodonín and Uherské Hradiště, and partially stretch into the districts of Břeclav and Zlín.

Region	Main characteristics
Central and western Moravia
Horácko (Moravian Highlands) and the subregion Podhorácko	An extensive region located at the boundary between Bohemia and Moravia. The major part of Horácko belongs to the Vysočina Region. The Horácko region encompasses areas around the towns of Dačice, Telč, Jihlava, Žďár nad Sázavou, Polička, Havlíčkův Brod, Pelhřimov, Kamenice, Pacov. The Podhorácko (or Dolácko) region consists of Moravské Budějovice, Třebíč, Velké Meziříčí, Nové Město na Moravě. The folk music of Horácko was influenced by Bohemian folklore and also by the Bavarian colonization. The character of the music of Horácko is rather instrumental. Here it is possible to find the influence of Bohemian regions such as Chodsko, Southern Bohemia and Central Bohemia. Major scales substantially predominate the music; few songs are written using minor scales. The tempi are moderate, mainly in 2/4 or 3/4 time. The folk music of Horácko uses syncopation.
Haná (Hanakia)	An ethnographic region in central Moravia approximately between the towns of Zábřeh, Holešov, Vyškov and Uničov. It is the largest and oldest traditional Moravian region. Today, the original folk music of Hanakia is revived thanks to various folk ensembles in Prostějov and Velká Bystřice and other towns and villages. Its musical character is similar to Bohemian folk music and was also influenced by court music.
Northeastern Moravia
Valašsko (Moravian Wallachia)	A mountainous region in the easternmost part of Moravia, near the Slovak border. The Moravian Wallachs supposedly came from the East, from the Slovak side. They established a shepherd culture in the Beskydy and nearby mountains, close to the towns of Rožnov pod Radhoštěm and Velké Karlovice. The area surrounding the towns of Vsetín, Valašské Klobouky, Vizovice and Zlín also belongs to Wallachia. The traditional music of Moravian Wallachia is influenced by Lachian and Polish folk culture on the north, and that of Slovakia in the south. Wallachian folk songs can be divided into several categories. Helekačky and hečené (hollering songs) were used for communication by children and women while herding cattle and horses. Whirling dance and rolling dance are types of dance songs in southern Wallachia. Slovak influence can be seen in the old Hungarian dance, which is close to the csárdás. A well-known male dance is also the odzemek. The simplest of traditional Wallachian instruments was the koncovka, a shepherd's end-blown flute. The early bagpipe music (gajdošská muzika) was later replaced by the string band with small portable hammered dulcimer or the table hammered dulcimer, an instrument which almost disappeared when it was replaced by the large Hungarian cimbalom.
Lašsko (Lachia)	A region located between the towns of Frýdek-Místek, Frýdlant nad Ostravicí, Frenštát pod Radhoštěm, Nový Jičín and Kopřivnice in northeastern Moravia. Lachia is known for its traditional folklore, and especially for its typical dance forms. Leoš Janáček, a Lachian native, created the orchestral cycle Lachian Dances, inspired by the music of Lachia.
Southeastern Moravia
Uherskohradišťsko a subregion of Dolňácko	The regional center is Uherské Hradiště. It consists of the following municipalities: Uherský Ostroh, Polešovice, Nedakonice, Kostelany, Boršice, Zlechov, Tupesy, Velehrad, Modrá, Staré Město, Mařatice, Sady, Kunovice, Huštěnovice, Jankovice, Babice among others. Folk music and arts traditions are highly developed in this agricultural area. Here many Czech scholars and composers such as Leoš Janáček, František Bartoš and František Sušil collected "peasant songs" – a specific folk song type from the neighbourhood of Bílovice. The most notable representatives of the folk music of this region are Jaroslav Čech Cimbalom Band, Kunovjan, Včelaran and Dolina.
Strážnicko a subregion of Dolňácko	Located around the town of Strážnice, this region consists of Petrov, Sudoměřice, Radějov, Tvarožná Lhota, Kněždub, Tasov, Hroznová Lhota, Kozojídky, Žeraviny. Notable representatives of this region include primáš Slávek Volavý (1922–1983) and cimbalom bands Danaj and Strážničan.
Kyjovsko a subregion of Dolňácko	With the central town of Kyjov, this area includes Kelčany, Osvětimany, Vracov, Milotice, Vacenovice, Ratíškovice, Dubňany, Mutěnice, Hovorany, Svatobořice-Mistřín. Kyjovsko has long been one of the most significant ethnographic regions of southern Moravia. The first written reference to the cimbalom originated here in 1799. The region's usual ensemble line-up was 1 or 2 violins, double bass, cimbalom and later also clarinet. The musical development in Moravia during this time was diverse as bagpipe music existed almost exclusively in Horňácko to the west. During the first half of the 20th century, cimbalom bands were nearly replaced by brass music, called "dechovka". However, the tradition was revived since the 1950s and the popularity of cimbalom bands continues to grow. The most characteristic folk dances of the Kyjovsko region are "skočná", "slovenská" and "verbuňk". The most important representative ensembles of this region are primáš Jura Petrů (1922–1984) and the Jura Petrů Cimbalom Band, Varmuža Cimbalom Band.
Horňácko (Upper Moravian Slovakia)	The small region located at the northwestern base of the White Carpathian Mountains. Its center is in Velká nad Veličkou. Horňácko consists of Hrubá Vrbka, Malá Vrbka, Kuželov, Javorník, Nová Lhota, Vápenky, Suchov, Lipov, and Louka. Leoš Janáček considered Horňácko "the most important center of traditional folk music in Moravian Slovakia". The development of Moravian traditional music remained uninterrupted only in the Horňácko region. The characteristic regional music style is represented mainly by the Martin Hrbáč Cimbalom Band.
Uherskobrodsko and the subregion Kopanice	The region at the borders of Moravia and Slovakia close to the town of Uherský Brod. It is sometimes considered a part of the Dolňácko Region. This region shows features of both traditional Moravian folk music and Slovak music. Slovak influence can be found in the mountainous part at the border of the region, namely in the villages of Strání, Březová, Starý Hrozenkov and surroundings – called Kopanice as a whole. The musical development in Uherskobrodsko was similar to the other regions in the Southern Moravia. Flutes (whistles), pipes, violins and other bowed instruments were consecutively added to a human voice. A string band (hudecká muzika) with a clarinet was a typical set up for Moravia of the 19th and part of the 20th century. However, it is impossible to find the original forms of the folk music of Uherskobrodsko. The notable cimbalom band of the region is Olšava.
Luhačovické Zálesí	A transitive region between Moravian Slovakia, Moravian Wallachia, and Hanakia. The center is in Luhačovice.
Podluží	The southernmost part of Moravian Slovakia, it consists of southern Podluží (Ladná, Stará Břeclav, Poštorná, Charvátská Nová Ves, Hlohovec, Kostice, Lanžhot, Tvrdonice, Hrušky, Týnec, Moravská Nová Ves) and northern Podluží (Mikulčice, Lužice, Josefov, Dolní Bojanovice, Starý Poddvorov, Prušánky). The musical development of this region was somewhat segregated. The most important representatives of the traditional music of the Podluží Region are primáš Jožka Kobzík (1929–2000) and the cimbalom bands Břeclavan and Jožka Severin Cimbalom Band.
Hanácké Slovácko (Hanakian Moravian Slovakia)	A transitive region between Moravian Slovakia and Hanakia. The southern part consists of Čejkovice, Čejč, Kobylí, Brumovice, Vrbice, Bořetice, Velké Pavlovice, Velké Bílovice, and Rakvice. The middle part consists of Krumvíř, Klobouky u Brna, Boleradice, Diváky and Těšany. The eastern part, close to the Kyjovsko Region, consists of Žarošice, Archlebov and Věteřov. The notable representative of this folk music is Cimbalom Band Vonica.

== Folklorism ==
Moravian traditional folk music has served as a source and inspiration to many different musical genres including classical composers such as Antonín Dvořák, Leoš Janáček, Vítězslav Novák and Bohuslav Martinů. Following World War II and the Czechoslovak coup d'état of 1948, folk songs were used as a part of the communist cultural programme. Ideology-influenced folk-song propaganda was created in order to support the new régime. The movement soon vanished, however, and the principles of traditional folk music headed toward more sophisticated processing. The "off-key and creaky" music of old village musicians was often replaced by the academic and virtuosic expression of professional players, typically represented by the Brněnský rozhasový orchestr lidových nástrojů (BROLN) (The Orchestra of Traditional Folk Instruments of the Brno Radio). In the second half of the 20th century, traditional folk bands were replaced with "chamber orchestras" which performed folk arrangements. Regional variability and originality was almost lost. Traditional music partially returned to its roots in the last decade of the 20th century and slowly began to restore its distinctives.

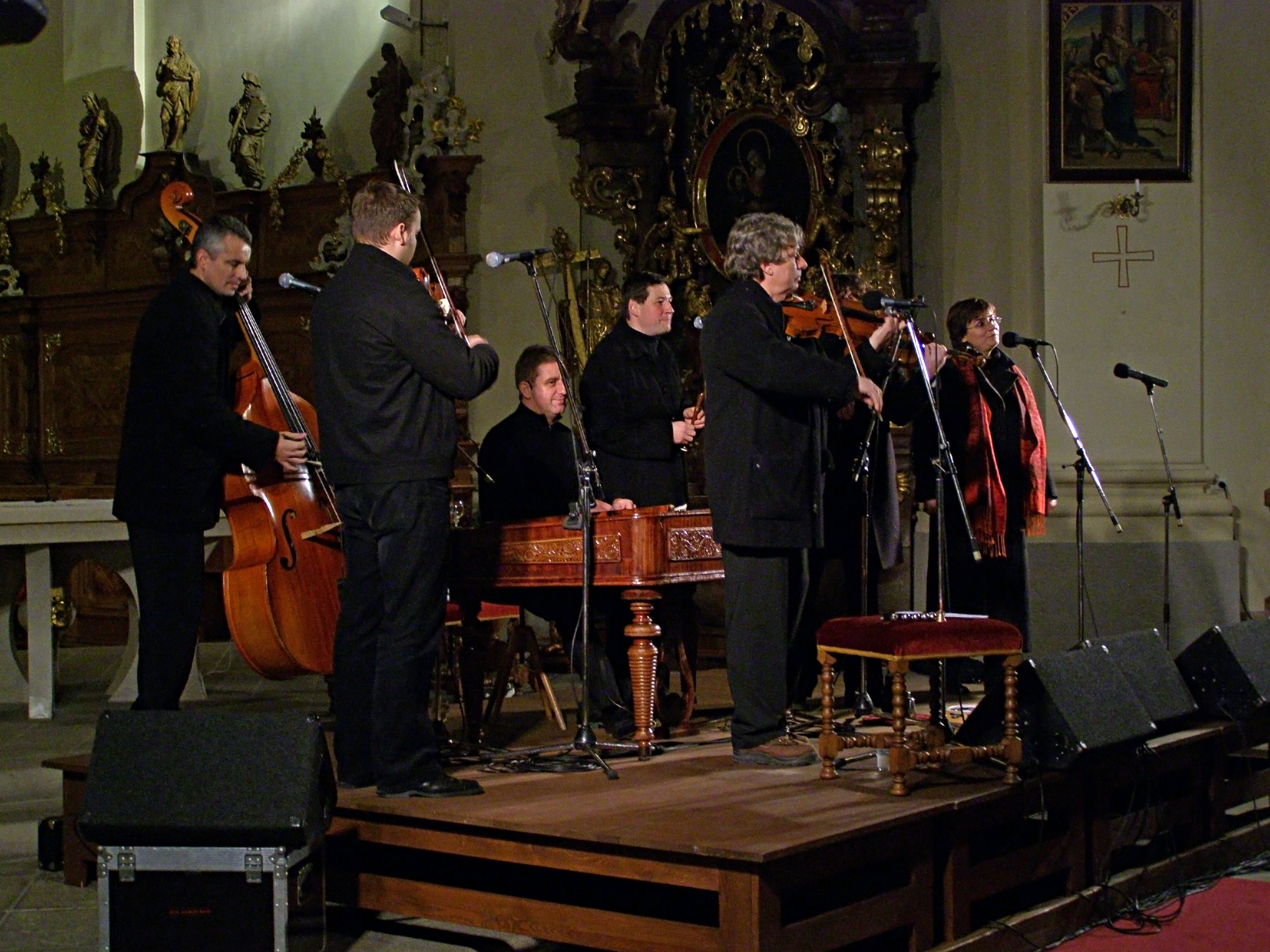
The Moravian folk ensemble Hradišťan at the Břevnov Monastery in Prague

The musical structure of Moravian folk song also influenced many jazz artists. Czech jazz musicians led by Karel Velebný and Jaromír Hnilička recorded the album "Týnom, tánom" in 1970, the first attempt to arrange the folk songs into jazz compositions. Other jazz musicians who have used elements of folk music include Jiří Stivín (Inspirations by Folklore CD) and Emil Viklický (Morava, 2003 CD, together with Billy Hart, George Mraz and Zuzana Lapčíková).

The songwriter Petr Ulrych, the founder of the band Javory, was one of the first musicians to deal with traditional music in the 1980s. Ulrych closely collaborated with violinist Jiří Pavlica, the leader of the cimbalom band Hradišťan. Hradišťan, a well-known traditional folk band, later turned away from folklore and focused on fusion in various world music projects (Yas-Kaz, Dizu Plaatjies and Altai Kai collaborations among others).

Widespread use of traditional folk music in the repertoire of Czech rock bands began in the 1990s. Significant representatives of this genre are Čechomor, Fleret and Vlasta Redl. Another important musician who deals with Moravian traditional music is the avant-garde singer and violinist Iva Bittová.

== Traditional music festivals in Moravia ==
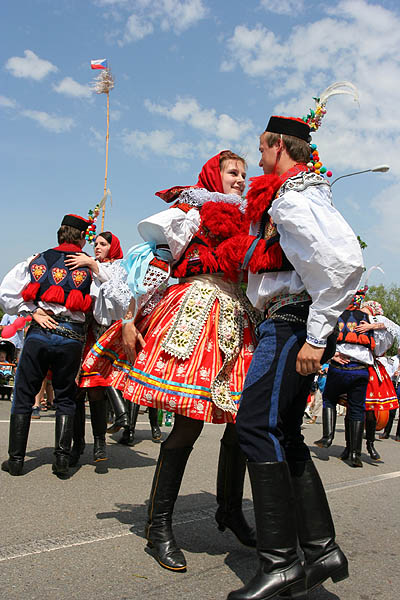
Male and female Moravian Slovak costumes worn during the Jízda králů Festival held annually in the village of Vlčnov in southeastern Moravia.

Annual festivals: The following festivals are held annually unless otherwise noted.

May

- Jízda králů (Ride of the Kings) Festival in Vlčnov
- Podluží v písni a tanci (Podluží in Songs and Dance Festival) – held in Tvrdonice

June

- Kosecké písně – held in Buchlovice
- International Folklore Festival in Frýdek-Místek
- Rožnovská valaška – held in Rožnov pod Radhoštěm
- International Folklore Festival in Strážnice

July

- Rožnovské slavnosti – held in Rožnov pod Radhoštěm
- International Folklore Festival "Evropské setkání národů" (European Meeting of Nations) – held in Telč
- Kopaničářské slavnosti (Kopanice Festival) – held in Starý Hrozenkov
- International Folklore Festival in Svatobořice-Mistřín
- Horňácké slavnosti (Horňácko Festival) – held in Velká nad Veličkou
- Romská píseň (Romani Song Festival) – held in Rožnov pod Radhoštěm

August

- Národopisný festival Kyjovska (Ethnographic Festival of the Kyjovsko Region) – held in Milotice
- Slovácký rok (Moravian Slovak Year Festival) – the oldest Moravian folklore festival, held every four years in Kyjov
- International Folklore Festival "Folklór bez hranic" (Folklore Without Borders) – held in Ostrava
- International Folklore Festival in Šumperk
- Festival in Liptál

August/September

- International Folklore Festival in Brno

September

- Hanácké slavnosti (Hanakian Festival) – held in Prostějov
- Slovácké slavnosti vína a otevřených památek (Slovácko Wine Festival And Open Monuments Days) – held in Uherské Hradiště

October

- Festival hudebních nástrojů (Festival of Musical Instruments) – held in Uherské Hradiště

== Selected recordings ==
=== Historical recordings ===
- Nejstarší nahrávky moravského a slovenského lidového zpěvu 1909-1912. (The oldest recordings of Moravian and Slovak traditional folk songs). (GNOSIS Brno, 1998) – phonographic recordings, made by Leoš Janáček and his collaborators.
- Ňorkova muzika z Hrubé Vrbky: Drsná pohlazení (ATON, 1999) – a representative selection of recordings from Horňácko region, 1932–1957
- Muzika Jožky Kubíka: Dalekonosné husle (Czech Radio Brno and GNOSIS Brno, 1998) – a representative selection of recordings from Horňácko region, 1953–1972
- František Okénka: Preleteuo vtáča (GNOSIS Brno, 1996)
- Strážnice Folklore Festival (Supraphon, 1994) – archive recordings from 1946 to 1994.
- Václav Harnoš, Jan Gajda a CM Slávka Volavého: Ve Strážnici néni pána (Danaj 2000) – archive recordings (1959–1993)
- Majstr Jožka Kubík (ATON, 1999) – archive recordings from Horňácko region
- Jan Miklošek (ATON 2000)
- Zpěvákovo rozjímání (ATON 2000) – the singer Martin Holý (1902–1985), archive recordings
- Jaroslav Kovářík, zpěvák z Kobylí (JK 0001-2431, 2000) – recordings from Hanakian Moravian Slovakia region, 1956–2000
- Mezinárodní folklorní festival ve Strážnici (International Folklore Festival in Strážnice), 1995-2000 – published by the Institute of the Traditional Folk Culture in Strážnice, 2000

=== Regional recordings ===
Antologie moravské lidové hudby - komplet 5CD. Epic five-disc Anthology of Moravian folk music of the early 21st century (Indies Scope, 2012)

Horňácko region (Upper Moravian Slovakia)

- Horňácký hudec Martin Hrbáč. (GNOSIS Brno, 1995)
- Pěkné kázáníčko od Martina Hrbáče (TONSTUDIO Rajchman, 1999)
- Došli sme k vám (INDIES, 1996) – traditional folk choirs from Horňácko region
- Horňácká cimbálová muzika Petra Galečky: Moja žena smutno plače (TONSTUDIO Rajchman, 1997)
- Velička: Ej, v tom velickém mlýně (TONSTUDIO Rajchman, 1998)
- Zpívání z Horňácka (INDIES, 1998)
- Jura Hudeček z Velké (ATON 2000)
- Horňácká muzika Miroslava Minkse: Pesnyčky ze Lhoték (GNOSIS Brno, 1999)
- Cimbálová muzika Petra Galečky: Ó lásko fortelná (TONSTUDIO Rajchman, 2000)
- Veličánek: Małučký sem já był (Velká nad Veličkou, 2001)
- Lipovjan: Na dolinách pod lipami (TONSTUDIO Rajchman, 1999)

Hradištské Dolňácko region (Uherské Hradiště Lower Moravian Slovakia)

- Včelaran: Ballad of Veruna (BONTON, 1991)
- Karel Rajmic – Cimbálová muzika Jaroslava Čecha: Túžení, súžení (LM MUSIC, 1997)
- Kunovjan: Ej, u Hradišťa pršalo (STYLTÓN, 1996)
- Cimbálová muzika Lúčka: Velikonoční rozjímání (GZ Loděnice, 1996)
- Cimbálová muzika Jaroslava Čecha: Muzicírování ve stodole (Klub kultury Uherské Hradiště, 2000)

Strážnické Dolňácko region (Strážnice Lower Moravian Slovakia)

- Cimbálová muzika Danaj: Gajdování (Freli, 1995)
- Cimbálová muzika Danaj: Ve Strážnici muzikanti hráli (Multisonic, 1998)
- Strážničan: Šla psota přes hory (1997)
- Strážničan: Co sa stalo kdysi (TONSTUDIO Rajchman, 1997)
- Cimbálová muzika Pavla Múčky: Při strážnickej bráně (TONSTUDIO Rajchman, 1997)
- Cimbálová muzika Danaj, Magdalena Múčková: Písničky z malířovy palety (Danaj, 2000)
- Cimbálová muzika Radošov (TONSTUDIO Rajchman, 2001)

Kyjovské Dolňácko region (Kyjov Lower Moravian Slovakia)

- Cimbálová muzika Jury Petrů: Legrúti jedú... (Region s.r.o., 1994)
- Varmužova cimbálová muzika: Písničky z domu (Supraphon, 1994)
- Varmužova cimbálová muzika: Na Kyjovsku (GNOSIS Brno, 1997)
- Varmužova cimbálová muzika: Chválabohu, že sem sa narodil... (TONSTUDIO Rajchman, 2000)
- Cimbálová muzika Jury Petrů: Na kyjovských lúkách (BMG Ariola ČR, 2000)

Hanácké Slovácko region (Hanakian Moravian Slovakia)

- Krajem beze stínu (Supraphon)
- Cimbálová muzika Vonica z Krumvíře (STYLTÓN, 1998)
- Vonica 2000 (STYLTÓN, 2000)

Podluží region

- Cimbálová muzika Břeclavan: Hodinka na Podluží (EDIT, 1994)
- Vladimír Zháněl s cimbálovou muzikou: Za starů Breclavů (RESTON, 1999)
- Cimbálová muzika Zádruha (TONSTUDIO Rajchman, 2001)
- Cimbálová muzika Břeclavan: Písně a balady (RESTON, 1999)

Luhačovské Zálesí region

- Cimbálová muzika Linda: Svatební písně z Luhačovského Zálesí (STYLTÓN, 1997)
- Cimbálová muzika Linda: Rok na Zálesí (STYLTÓN, 2000)

Uherskobrodsko and Kopanice regions

- Olšava, OĽUN, BROLN: Dívča z Javoriny (LM MUSIC, 1997)
- Kytice z Uherskobrodska (compilation, GNOSIS Brno, 1998)
- Hudecká muzika Kopaničář: Okolo Hrozenka (Starý Hrozenkov, 1999)

Valašsko region (Moravian Wallachia)

- Cimbálová muzika Polajka: Už zme tady, už zme tu (RS 1992)
- Jarmila Šuláková: A vy páni muziganti (Supraphon, 1993)
- Jarmila Šuláková: Valaši, Valaši (W MUSIC, 1996)
- Cimbálová muzika Vsacan: Chodívali chlapci k nám (1998)
- Cimbálová muzika Kašava: Na tom našem potoce (EDIT, 1998)
- Cimbálová muzika Jasénka: Trvalky (LM MUSIC, 1998)
- Cimbálová muzika Technik (Jan Rokyta): Valašské balady (STYLTÓN, 1999)
- Cimbálová muzika Soláň: Při Betlémě na salašu (STYLTÓN, 1995)
- Cimbálová muzika Soláň: A tož jaků (LM MUSIC, 1998)
- Javorník Brno: Půl století s cimbálovou muzikou (Písnička, 2000)
- Cimbálová muzika Soláň, Zdeněk Kašpar a hosté: Vałaské pěsničky (GNOSIS Brno, 2000)
- Cimbálová muzika Jasénka: Přes Javorník chodník (GNOSIS Brno, 2001)

Lašsko region (Lachia)

- Ondřejnica: Moje Lašsko (STYLTÓN, 1996)
- Ondřejnica: Lašské vánoce (STYLTÓN, 1997)
- Valašský vojvoda: Písně a tance z lašsko-valašského pomezí (STYLTÓN, 1997)
- Cimbálová muzika Ostravica (STYLTÓN, 1996)

Haná region (Hanakia)

- Hanácká muzika Ječmeni: V Prostijově na renko (Ječmeni, 1999)
- Debe decke tak belo (Moravia Folklor, 2001)

Horácko region

- Studánka 1, 2 (available only on MC)
