= Jan Netopilík =

Czech long jumper (1936–2022)

Personal information
- Nationality: Czech
- Born: 24 November 1936 Tvrdonice, Czechoslovakia
- Died: 2 February 2022 (aged 85) Bratislava, Slovakia

Sport
- Sport: Athletics
- Event: Long jump

Jan Netopilík (24 November 1936 – 2 February 2022) was a Czechoslovak athlete. He competed in the men's long jump at the 1960 Summer Olympics. Later on, he moved to Bratislava, where he worked as an athletic trainer. Netopilík died in Bratislava on 2 February 2022, at the age of 85.
