= Polešovice =

- Market town
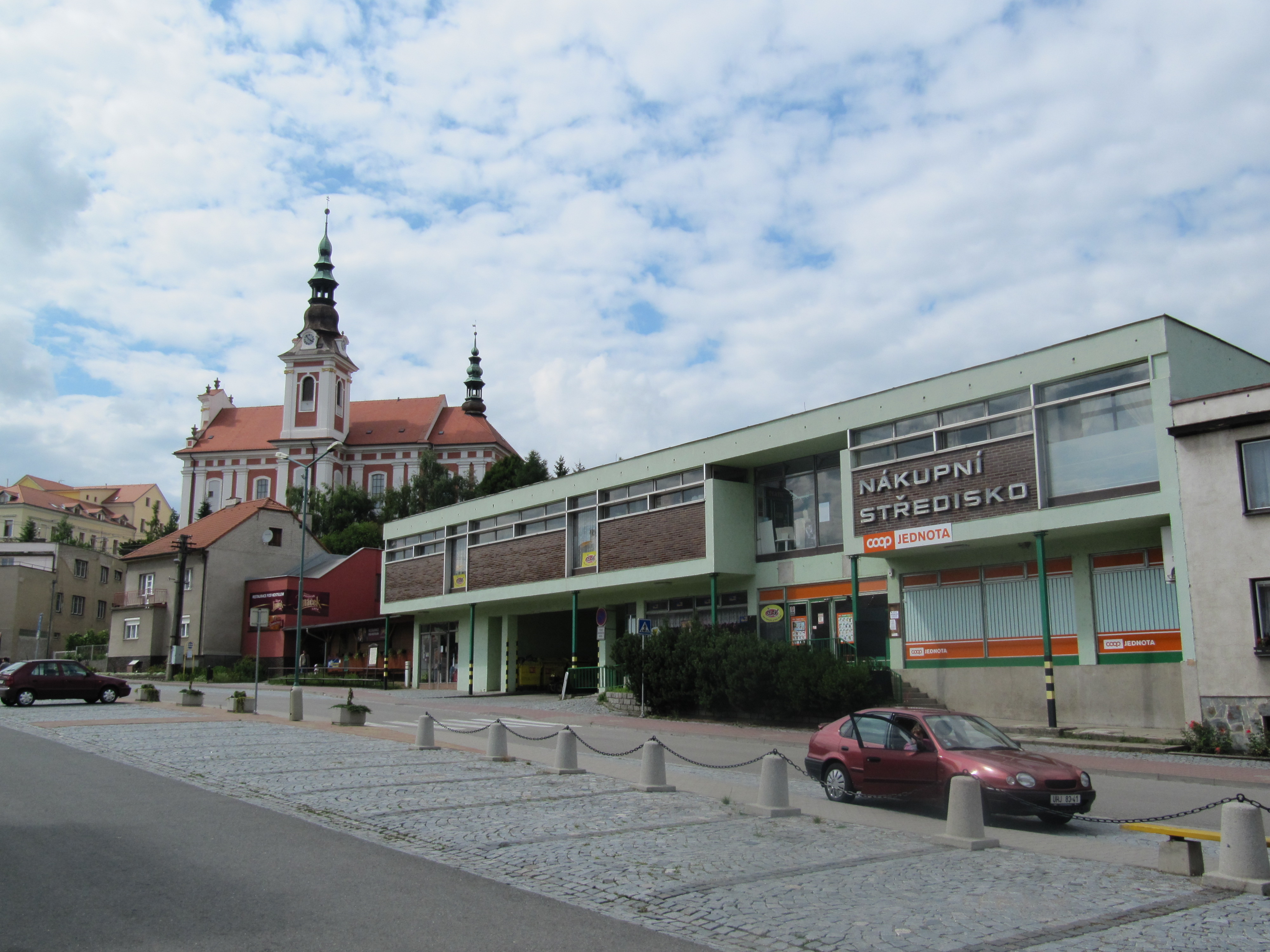
- Centre of Polešovice

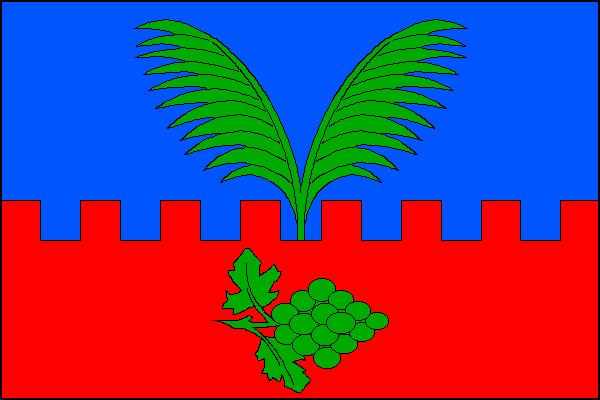
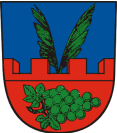
- Flag Coat of arms

- Location in the Czech Republic
- Coordinates: 49°2′2″N 17°20′26″E
- Country: Czech Republic
- Region: Zlín
- District: Uherské Hradiště
- First mentioned: 1220

Area
  - Total: 13.04 km^{2} (5.03 sq mi)
- Elevation: 223 m (732 ft)

Population (2026-01-01)
  - Total: 2,047
  - Density: 157.0/km^{2} (406.6/sq mi)
- Time zone: UTC+1 (CET)
  - Summer (DST): UTC+2 (CEST)
- Postal code: 687 37
- Website: www.polesovice.cz

Polešovice (Czech pronunciation: [ˈpolɛʃovɪtsɛ]) is a market town in Uherské Hradiště District in the Zlín Region of the Czech Republic. It has about 2,000 inhabitants.

== Geography ==
Polešovice is located about 9 kilometres (6 mi) southwest of Uherské Hradiště and 30 km (19 mi) southwest of Zlín. The western part of the municipal territory lies in the Kyjov Hills and the eastern part lies in the Lower Morava Valley. The highest point is at 360 m (1,181 ft) above sea level.

== History ==
The first written mention of Polešovice is from 1220, when it was owned by the newly-established Cistercian monastery in Velehrad. The Church of Saints Peter and Paul was first mentioned in 1320, but it was destroyed by the Hussites in 1421. After the Hussite Wars, the church was built again. In 1595, Polešovice was promoted to a town by Emperor Rudolf II.

== Demographics ==
Historical population

Year	Pop.	±%
1869	1,984	—
1880	2,047	+3.2%
1890	2,046	−0.0%
1900	2,150	+5.1%
1910	2,109	−1.9%

Year	Pop.	±%
1921	2,092	−0.8%
1930	2,103	+0.5%
1950	2,251	+7.0%
1961	2,480	+10.2%
1970	2,281	−8.0%

Year	Pop.	±%
1980	2,203	−3.4%
1991	2,020	−8.3%
2001	1,989	−1.5%
2011	1,939	−2.5%
2021	1,939	+0.0%

Source: Censuses

== Economy ==
Polešovice is known for viticulture and winemaking. The market town lies in the Slovácká wine subregion.

== Transport ==
The Přerov–Břeclav railway line crosses the territory, but there is no train station. Polešovice is served by the station in neighbouring Nedakonice.

== Sights ==
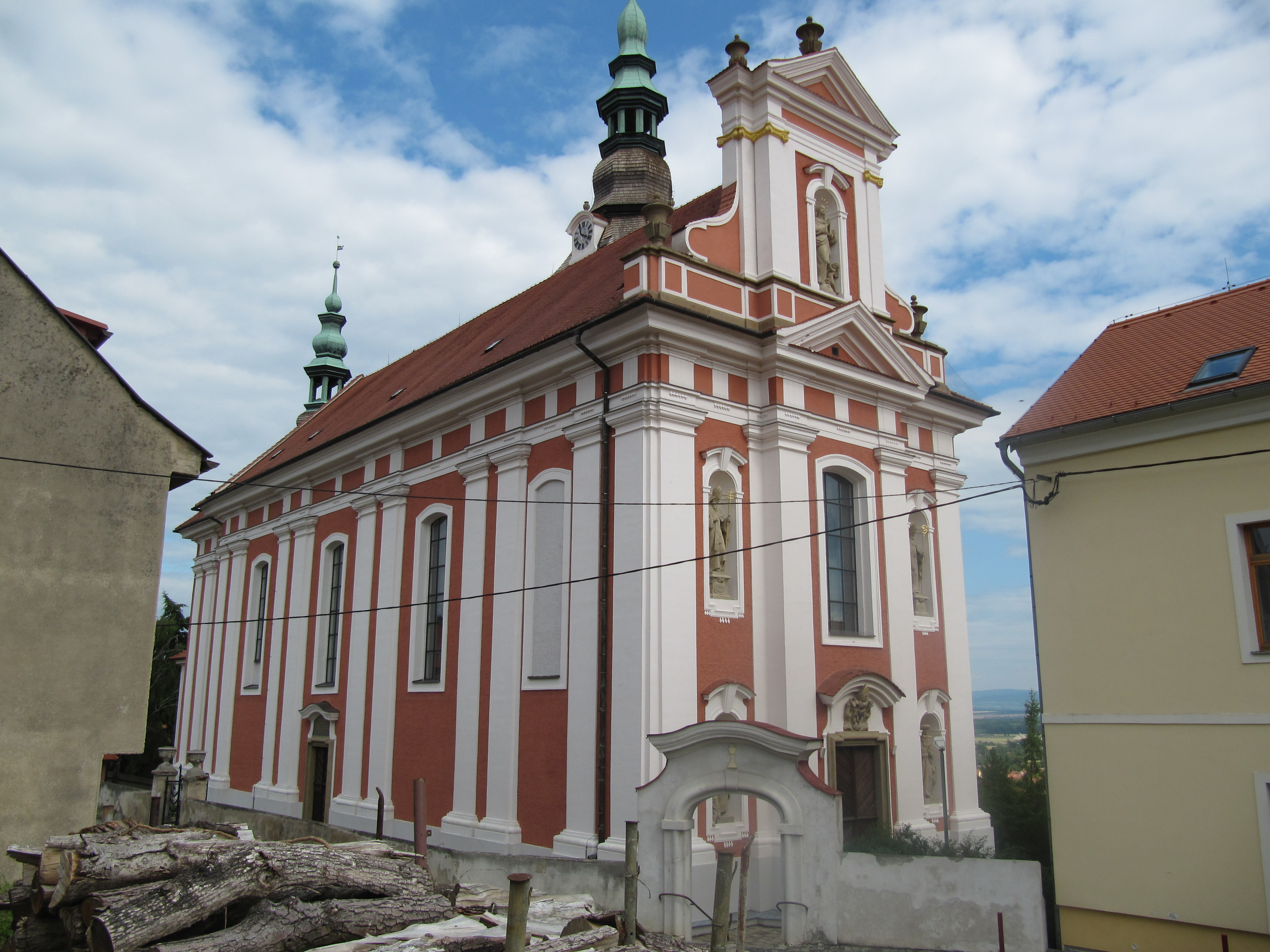
Church of Saints Peter and Paul

The main landmark of Polešovice is the Church of Saints Peter and Paul. It was rebuilt to its current Baroque form in 1725–1735.

Northwest of the market town is the wooden Floriánka observation tower. It is 20 m (66 ft) high.

== Notable people ==
- Jaroslav Krejčí (1916–2014), Czech-British sociologist
