= Jarmila Šuláková =

Czech actress and singer (1929–2017)

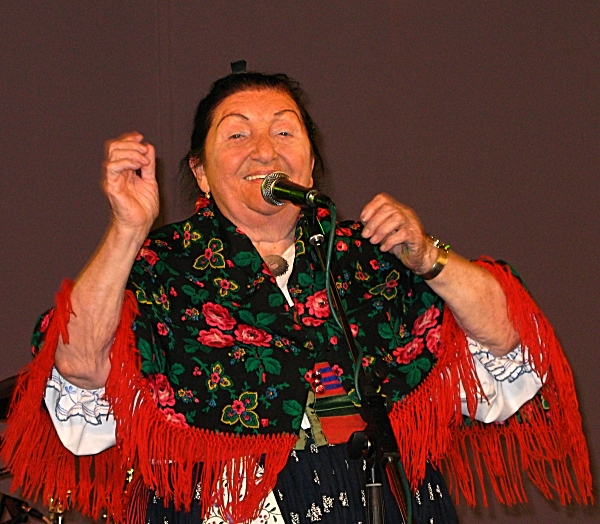
Jarmila Šuláková performing in 2009

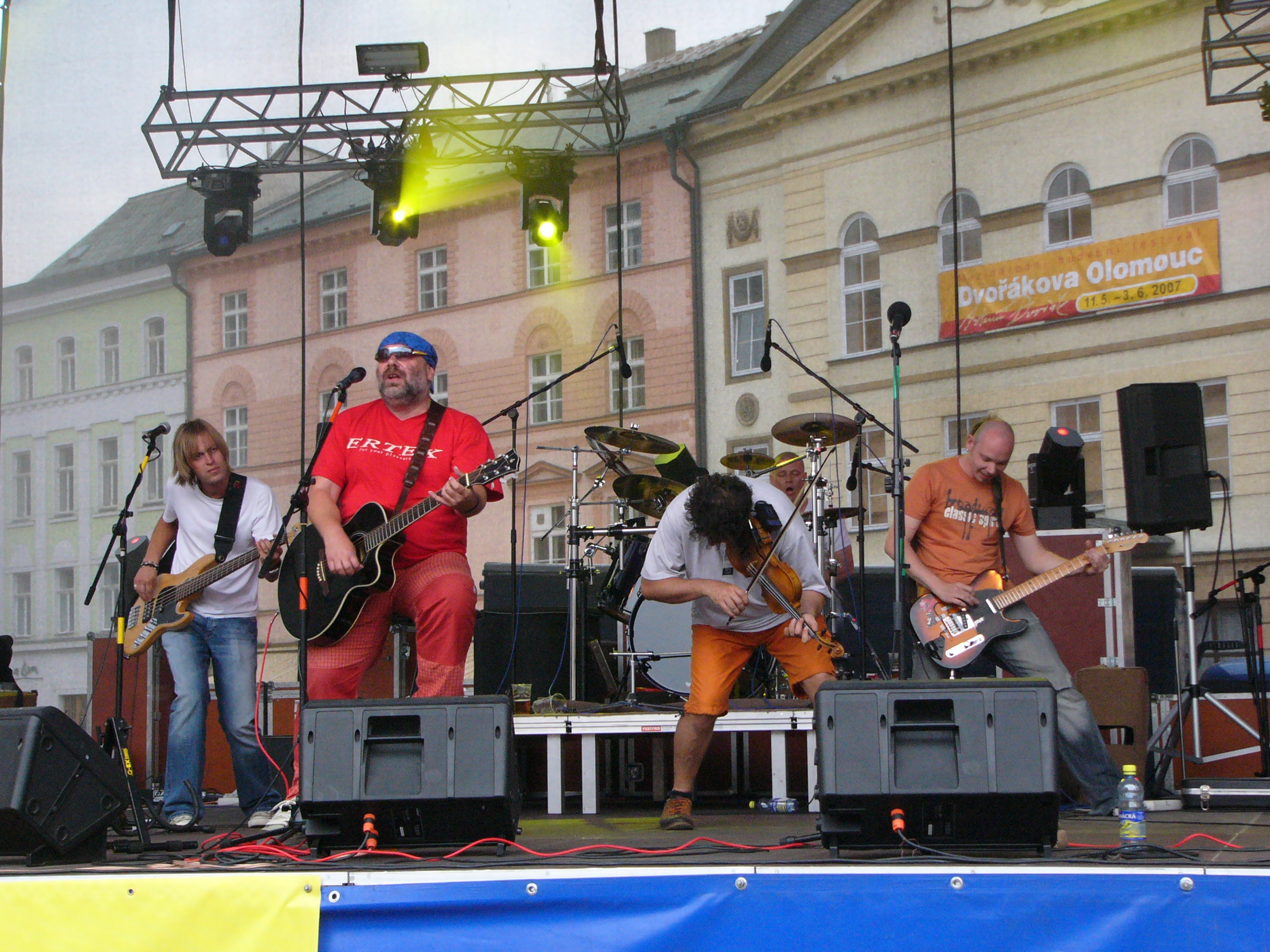
From 1994 to 2011 she has collaborated with the Czech folk-rock group Fleret

Jarmila Šuláková (27 June 1929 – 11 February 2017) was a Czech vocalist and occasional actress. She was a significant exponent of Moravian traditional music, sometimes called the "queen of the folk song".

She was born in Vsetín, Moravian Wallachia, into an artistic family. Her mother was an actress, dancer and singer, her father was a musician. She studied to be a seamstress. In 1950 she began working as a sales assistant in the Supraphon shop in Vsetín, where she remained until her retirement in 1985. She married the violinist Ludvík Schmidt (died in 1970). They had one child, daughter Zuzana.

Šuláková sang in various ensembles since her school years. Since 1952, she was a soloist of BROLN (The Orchestra of Traditional Folk Instruments of the Brno Radio), with which she performed in the former Czechoslovakia and abroad (Vietnam, China, Mongolia, the Soviet Union, Korea, Cuba, Belgium, United Kingdom, Senegal, Bulgaria, Romania, Japan, USA, Canada, Poland, Germany, Netherlands, Finland, Denmark). Her collaboration with BROLN lasted until October 1993. From 1994 to 2011 she regularly performed with the folk-rock group Fleret.

Her songs appeared on numerous audio recordings. In 1979, she was awarded the title Merited Artist and in 1989 she was named National Artist. Additionally, she won 1955 bronze award and 1957 silver award at the World Festival of Youth and Students.

Šuláková died in Vsetín on 11 February 2017 at the age of 87.

== Selected discography ==
- Jarmila Šuláková (LP, Supraphon 1979, 1117 2549 G)
- A vy páni muziganti. Folk Songs From Moravian Wallachia (CD, Supraphon 1993, 11 1839-2 711)
- Fleret & Jarmila Šuláková (CD, 1995)
- Kyčera, Kyčera (songs from 1954 to 1971, CD, Czech Radio + Galén 2014, originally Supraphon, G 14 061 2)

== Filmography ==
- Ještě svatba nebyla (1954)
- Všichni mají talent (1984)
