= Vladimír Vašíček =

Czech painter (1919–2003)

Vladimír Vašíček (29 September 1919, Mistřín – 29 August 2003, Svatobořice) was a Czech painter. He was one of the pioneers of Czech modern and abstract painting after the World War II.

Vladimír Vašíček is one of the foremost representatives of non–figurative painting in the Czech Republic. His artistic production spans the second half of the 20th century. He lived and worked in his birthplace Svatobořice-Mistřín in the South Moravian Region.

== Life and work ==
The beginnings of Vašíček's artistic career were delayed by World War II – he could enter the Academy of Fine Arts only after the Liberation of the country. Having finished his studies he returned to his native region, where he founded his family and built a studio. In the hard days of a totalitarian regime, he persisted in his search for modern artistic expression and was trying to keep his artistic freedom and remain independent from the doctrine of the so-called socialistic realism.

Together with his friends, Moravian painters Kubíček, Matal and Vaculka, he searched for the possibilities of concentrated expression accompanied by stylized subjects and their transformation based on fauvist, cubist, futuristic, and particularly Orphist incentives. He took his inspiration from the classics of modern painting, mainly the work of František Kupka.

Starting from 1960, he produced non-figurative paintings. Initially, his artistic form was quite variable, but it later became stabilized in two main lines that were antipodal in a certain way. These lines were built on a common aesthetic principle that was based on the expression of the dynamism of life, a sensualistic relation to reality, and a harmonization principle that dominated the entire painting.

Vašíček reacted to the topical incentives of world art, for instance by increased interest in the expression value of the surface structure of the painting matter, by return to the principles of geometric abstraction, the Freedom of Tashist painting and spontaneity of gestic art, transforming all of these incentives into his own individual version rooted in the world of the artist's original thinking. Vašíček's paintings are conceived as a paraphrase of nonmaterial phenomena, energy, natural forces, physical and biological processes – of events in which man takes part as well.

The artist sees the surrounding world on the basis of both exact facts verified by science, and through his own perception and experience. For him it represents a firm system ruled by intrinsic logic and harmony. An antipode to this feeling of certitude is the unrest of the soul, the chaos of human heart. The two components of existence come together in the ambivalent being. Together with Nicolaus Cusanus the painter perceives it as absolute being that has resulted from the Creator's utterly wise project.

Vašíček's paintings reflect his philosophical vision and perception of universal truths, attempting to integrate incompatible polarities. However, they are deeply rooted in the experience of the simplest wonders of nature and the poetry of the fields, meadows, and gardens of the sunny south of Moravia.

Vladimír Vašíček created actively until his last day (29 August 2003).
