= Boršice =

- Municipality
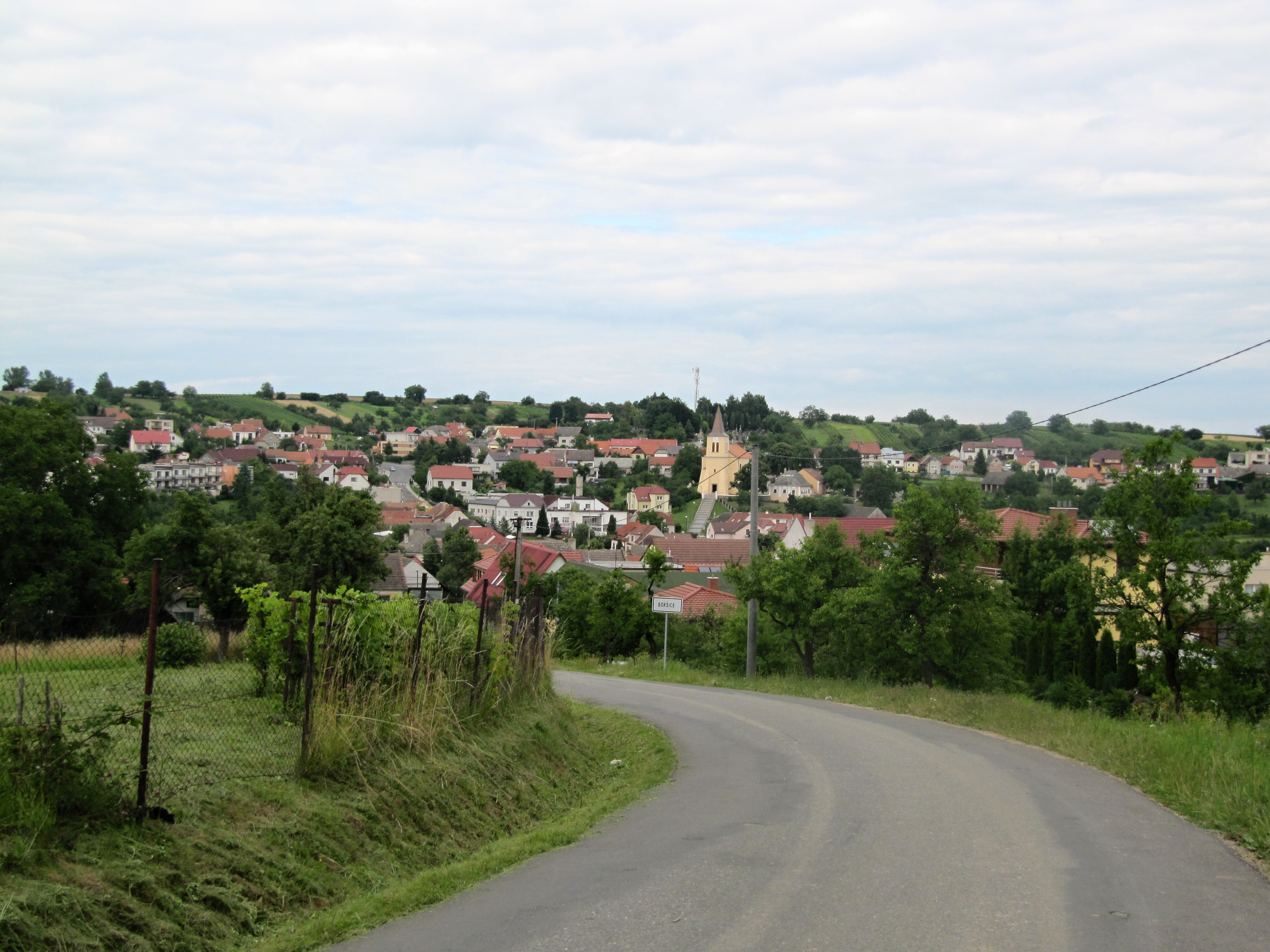
- View from the southwest

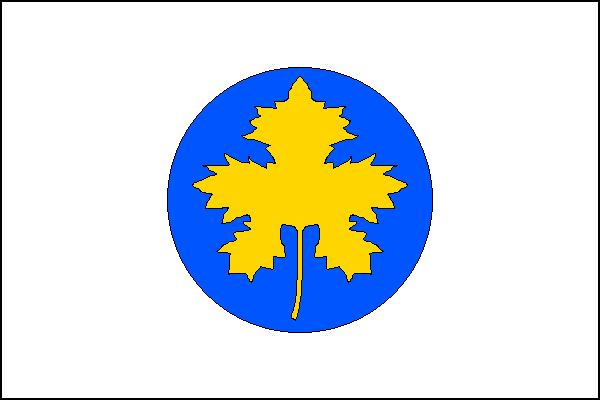
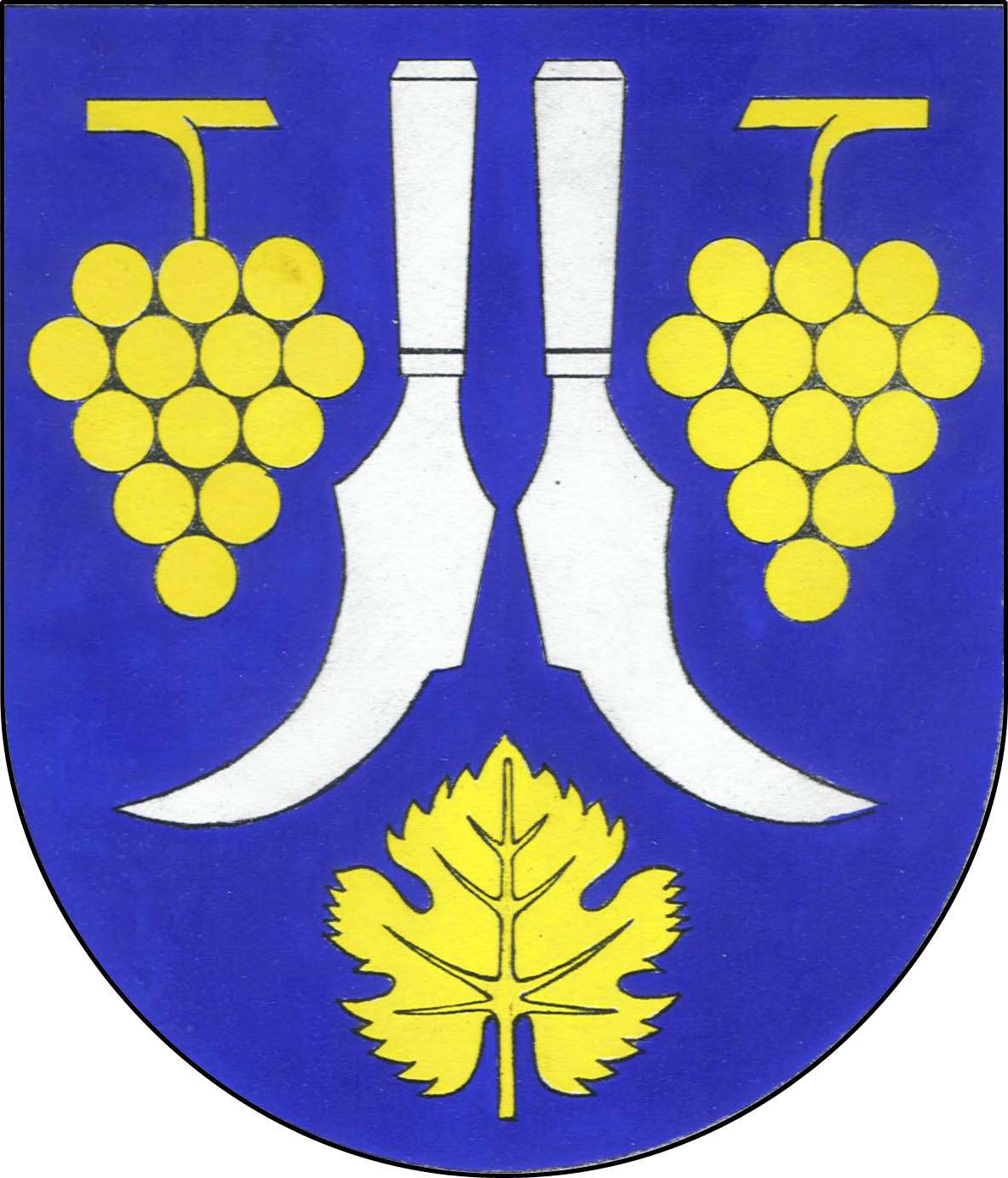
- Flag Coat of arms

- Location in the Czech Republic
- Coordinates: 49°3′45″N 17°21′3″E
- Country: Czech Republic
- Region: Zlín
- District: Uherské Hradiště
- First mentioned: 1220

Area
  - Total: 9.82 km^{2} (3.79 sq mi)
- Elevation: 212 m (696 ft)

Population (2026-01-01)
  - Total: 2,186
  - Density: 223/km^{2} (577/sq mi)
- Time zone: UTC+1 (CET)
  - Summer (DST): UTC+2 (CEST)
- Postal code: 687 09
- Website: www.borsice.cz

Boršice (in 1960–1996 Boršice u Buchlovic) is a municipality and village in Uherské Hradiště District in the Zlín Region of the Czech Republic. It has about 2,200 inhabitants.

== Etymology ==
The name is derived from the personal name Boreš, meaning "the village of Boreš's people".

== Geography ==
Boršice is located about 8 kilometres (5 mi) west of Uherské Hradiště and 28 km (17 mi) southwest of Zlín. It lies mostly in the Kyjov Hills, only a small part of the municipal territory in the northwest extends into the Chřiby range and a small part in the southeast extends into the Lower Morava Valley. The highest point is at 334 m (1,096 ft) above sea level. The stream Dlouhá řeka flows through the municipality.

== History ==
The first written mention of Boršice is from 1220.

From 1960 to 1996, the village was named Boršice u Buchlovic to distinguish it from Boršice u Blatnice. On 1 January 1997, the name changed back to Boršice.

== Demographics ==
Historical population

Year	Pop.	±%
1869	1,379	—
1880	1,393	+1.0%
1890	1,428	+2.5%
1900	1,580	+10.6%
1910	1,711	+8.3%

Year	Pop.	±%
1921	1,671	−2.3%
1930	1,585	−5.1%
1950	1,755	+10.7%
1961	2,121	+20.9%
1970	2,155	+1.6%

Year	Pop.	±%
1980	2,266	+5.2%
1991	2,229	−1.6%
2001	2,283	+2.4%
2011	2,182	−4.4%
2021	2,085	−4.4%

Source: Censuses

== Transport ==
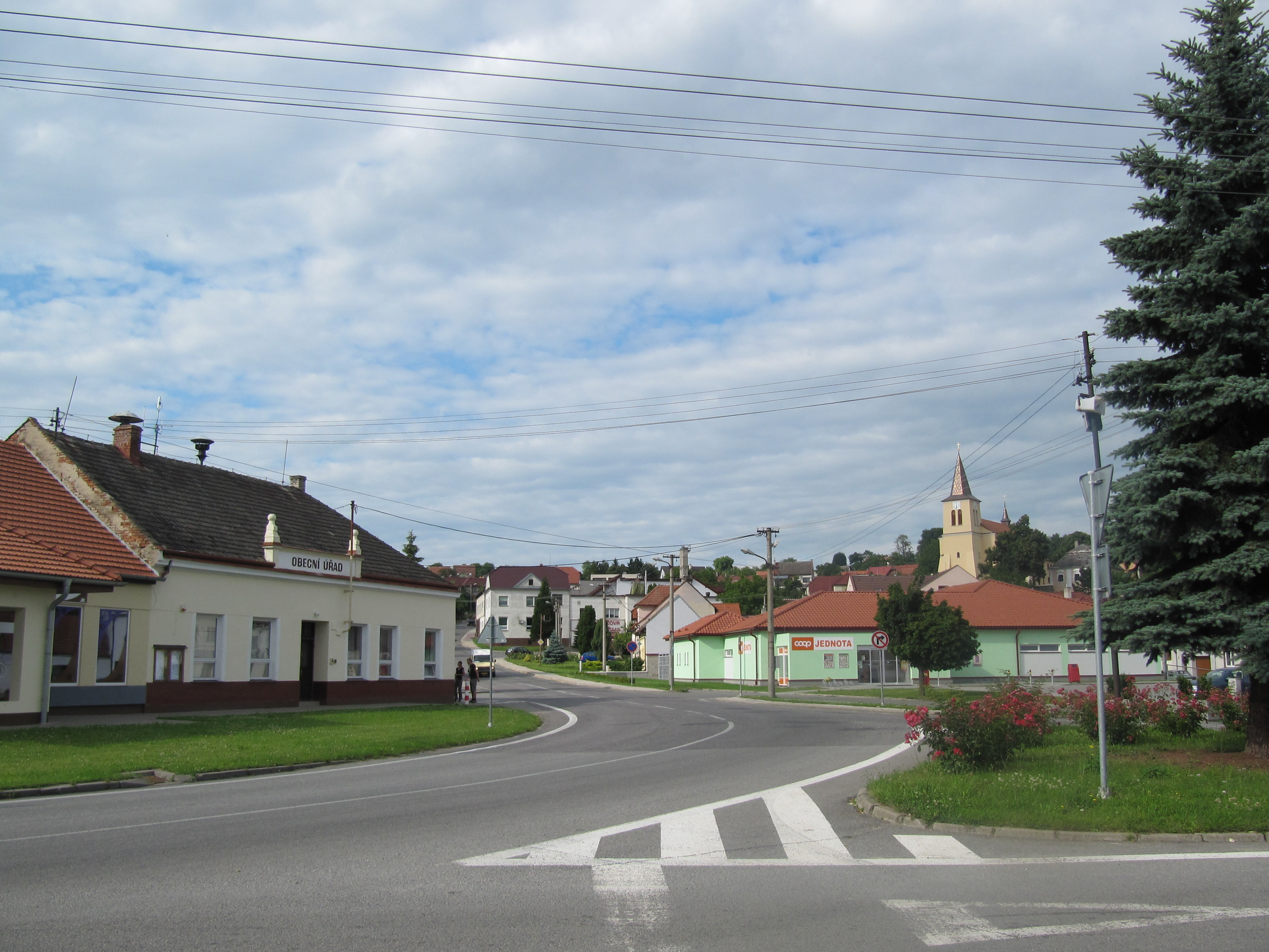
Centre of Boršice

There are no railways or major roads passing through the municipality.

== Sights ==
The main landmark of Boršice is the Church of Saint Wenceslaus. It was built in the 18th century, on the site of an older church from the 13th century.
