= Tvrdonice =

- Municipality
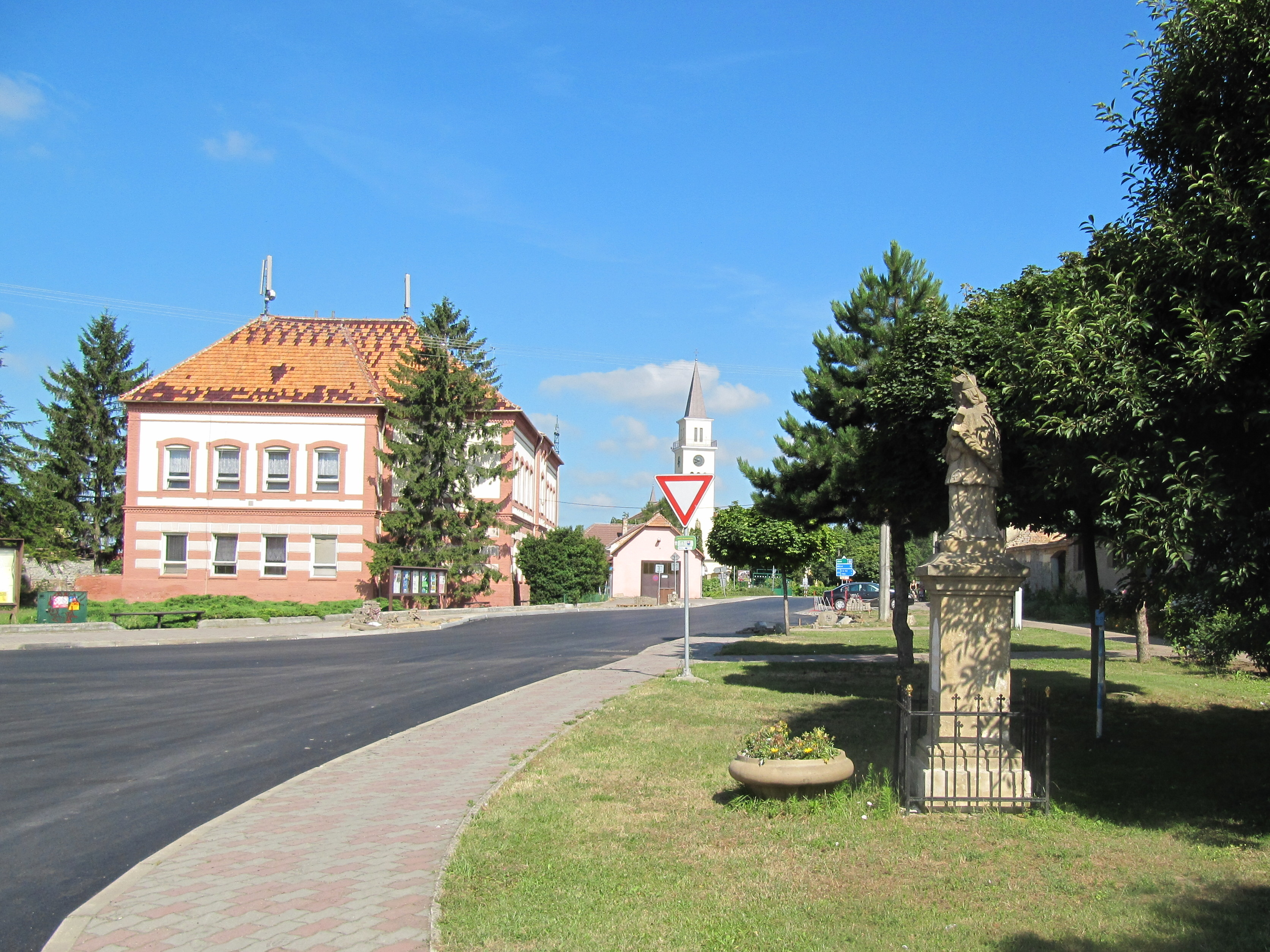
- Centre of Tvrdonice

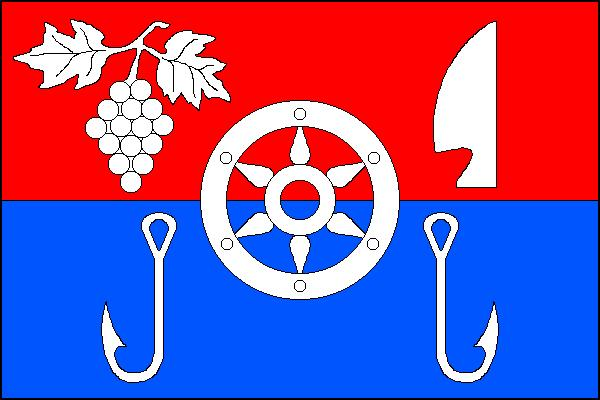
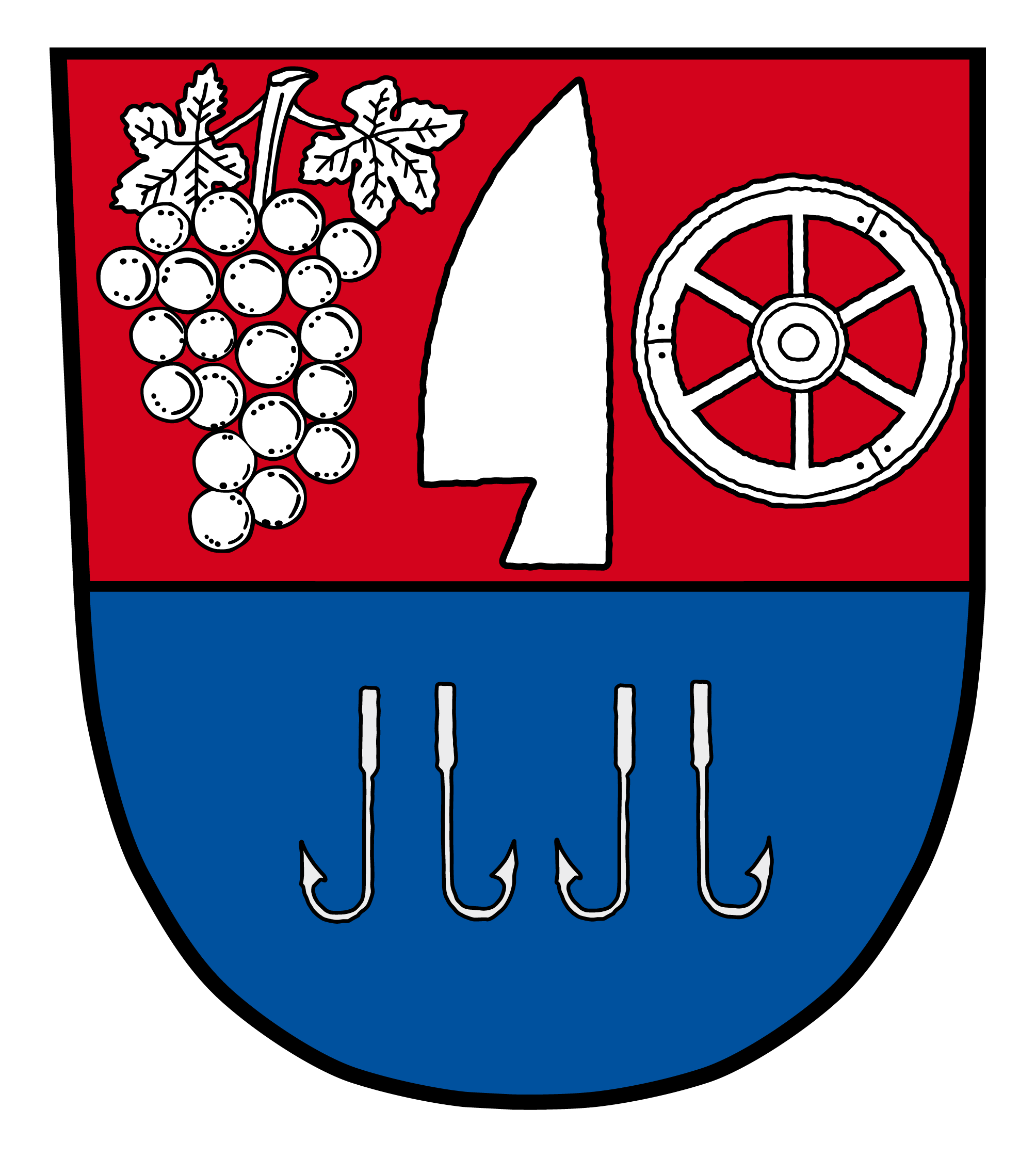
- Flag Coat of arms

- Location in the Czech Republic
- Coordinates: 48°45′38″N 16°59′40″E
- Country: Czech Republic
- Region: South Moravian
- District: Břeclav
- First mentioned: 1264

Area
  - Total: 21.20 km^{2} (8.19 sq mi)
- Elevation: 176 m (577 ft)

Population (2026-01-01)
  - Total: 2,075
  - Density: 97.88/km^{2} (253.5/sq mi)
- Time zone: UTC+1 (CET)
  - Summer (DST): UTC+2 (CEST)
- Postal code: 691 53
- Website: www.tvrdonice.cz

Tvrdonice (German: Turnitz) is a municipality and village in Břeclav District in the South Moravian Region of the Czech Republic. It has about 2,100 inhabitants.

== Geography ==
Tvrdonice is located about 8 kilometres (5 mi) northeast of Břeclav and 55 km (34 mi) southeast of Brno, on the border with Slovakia. It lies in a flat landscape in the Lower Morava Valley. The municipality is crossed by the Kyjovka River. The Czech–Slovak border is formed here by the Morava River.

== History ==
The first written mention of Tvrdonice is from 1264. In 1538, the village was promoted to a market town, but it later lost the title.

== Demographics ==
Historical population

Year	Pop.	±%
1869	1,397	—
1880	1,563	+11.9%
1890	1,669	+6.8%
1900	1,795	+7.5%
1910	2,013	+12.1%

Year	Pop.	±%
1921	2,120	+5.3%
1930	2,116	−0.2%
1950	1,997	−5.6%
1961	2,204	+10.4%
1970	2,199	−0.2%

Year	Pop.	±%
1980	2,173	−1.2%
1991	2,114	−2.7%
2001	2,067	−2.2%
2011	2,050	−0.8%
2021	2,019	−1.5%

Source: Censuses

== Economy ==
Tvrdonice is known for viticulture. It lies in the Slovácká wine subregion.

== Transport ==
The D2 motorway (part of the European route E65) from Brno to the Czech–Slovak border in Lanžhot runs along the western municipal border.

== Sights ==
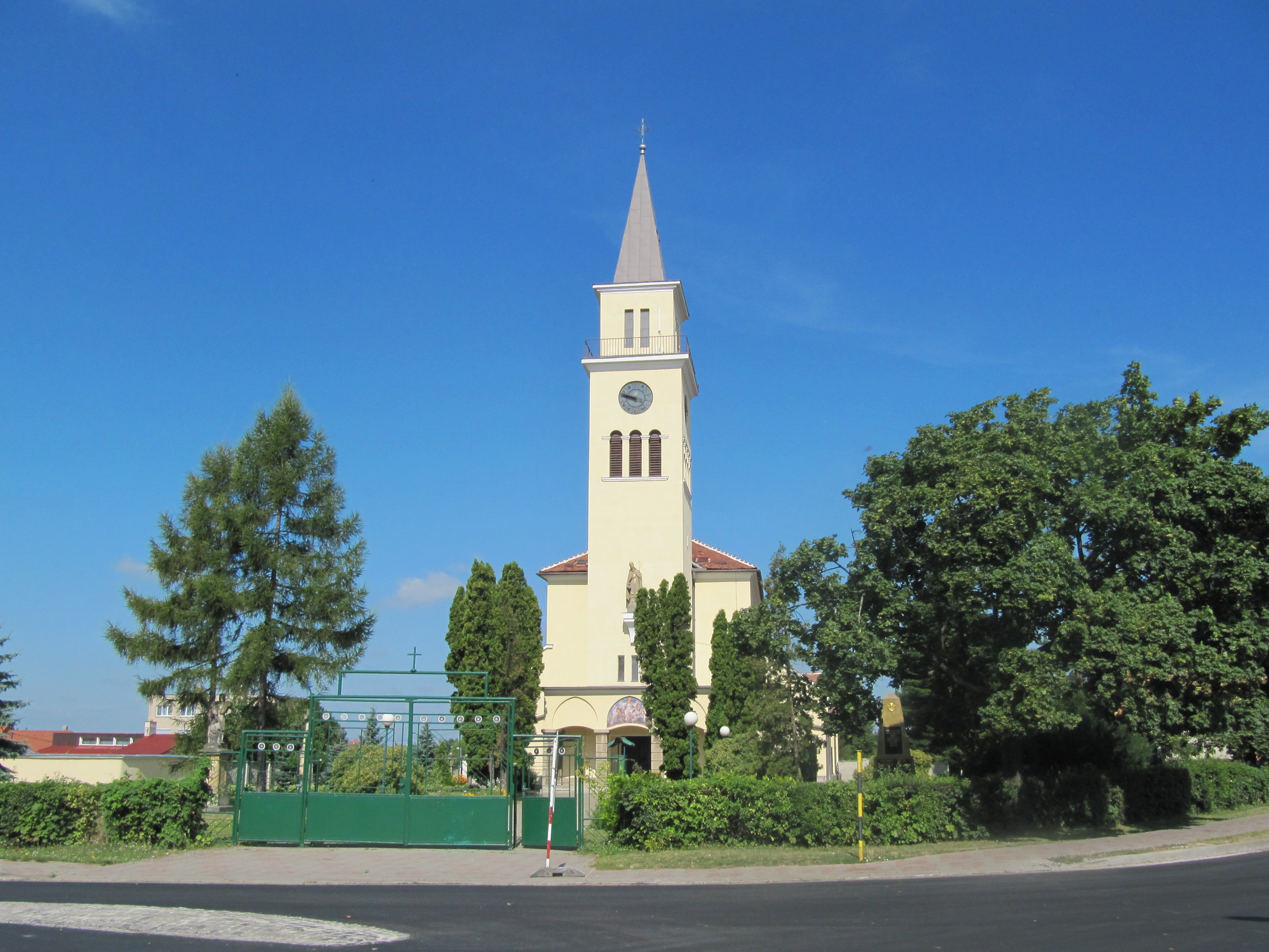
Church of Saint Nicholas

The only protected cultural monuments in Tvrdonice are a statue of Saint John of Nepomuk from the end of the 19th century and a Baroque column shrine, which dates from 1760.

The main landmark of Tvrdonice is the Church of Saint Nicholas. Existence of the original church was first documented in 1673. Due to its poor condition, it was demolished in 1879. The new neo-Gothic church was built in 1881–1884, but it has to be demolished in 1939 due to cracks caused by its hillside location. Today, there is a park on its site. The current Church of Saint Nicholas was built nearby in 1940–1941.

== Notable people ==
- Jan Netopilík (1936–2022), athlete
