= Prušánky =

- Municipality
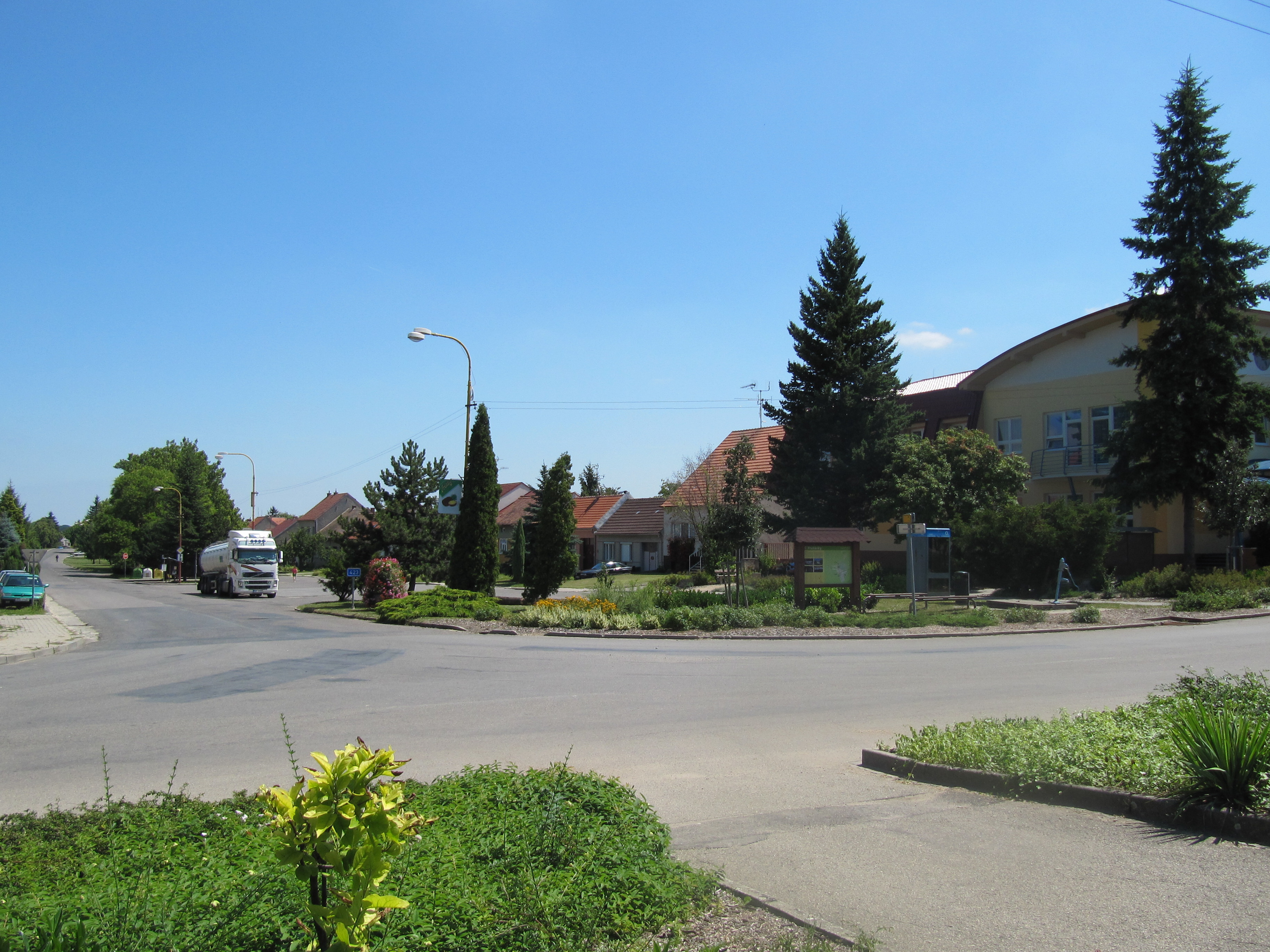
- Centre of Prušánky

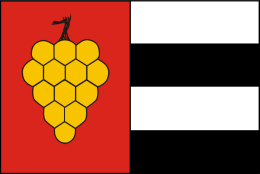
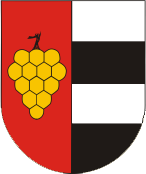
- Flag Coat of arms

- Location in the Czech Republic
- Coordinates: 48°49′42″N 16°58′50″E
- Country: Czech Republic
- Region: South Moravian
- District: Hodonín
- First mentioned: 1261

Area
  - Total: 14.14 km^{2} (5.46 sq mi)
- Elevation: 185 m (607 ft)

Population (2026-01-01)
  - Total: 2,167
  - Density: 153.3/km^{2} (396.9/sq mi)
- Time zone: UTC+1 (CET)
  - Summer (DST): UTC+2 (CEST)
- Postal code: 696 21
- Website: www.obecprusanky.cz

Prušánky is a municipality and village in Hodonín District in the South Moravian Region of the Czech Republic. It has about 2,200 inhabitants.

== Geography ==
Prušánky is located about 10 kilometres (6 mi) west of Hodonín and 48 km (30 mi) southeast of Brno. It lies on the border between the Kyjov Hills and Lower Morava Valley. The highest point is at 260 m (853 ft) above sea level. The Prušánka Stream flows through the municipality.

== History ==
The first written mention of Prušánky is from 1261, when the village was donated to the newly established Smilheim monastery. In 1497, after the monastery was abolished, Prušánky was acquired by the Lords of Kunštát. In the second half of the 16th century, a community of the Anabaptists settled in the village. Prušánky suffered greatly in 1605 (during the Bocskai uprising) and during the Thirty Years' War. More than half of the homesteads were abandoned after the war, making the village one of the least affected in the region. In 1842 and 1846, Prušánky was hit by severe fires.

== Demographics ==
Historical population

Year	Pop.	±%
1869	1,305	—
1880	1,571	+20.4%
1890	1,679	+6.9%
1900	1,660	−1.1%
1910	1,840	+10.8%

Year	Pop.	±%
1921	2,024	+10.0%
1930	2,015	−0.4%
1950	1,998	−0.8%
1961	2,206	+10.4%
1970	2,136	−3.2%

Year	Pop.	±%
1980	2,090	−2.2%
1991	2,082	−0.4%
2001	2,095	+0.6%
2011	2,090	−0.2%
2021	2,105	+0.7%

Source: Censuses

== Economy ==
Prušánky is known for viticulture and winemaking. The municipality lies in the Slovácká wine subregion.

== Transport ==
There are no railways or major roads passing through the municipality.

== Sights ==
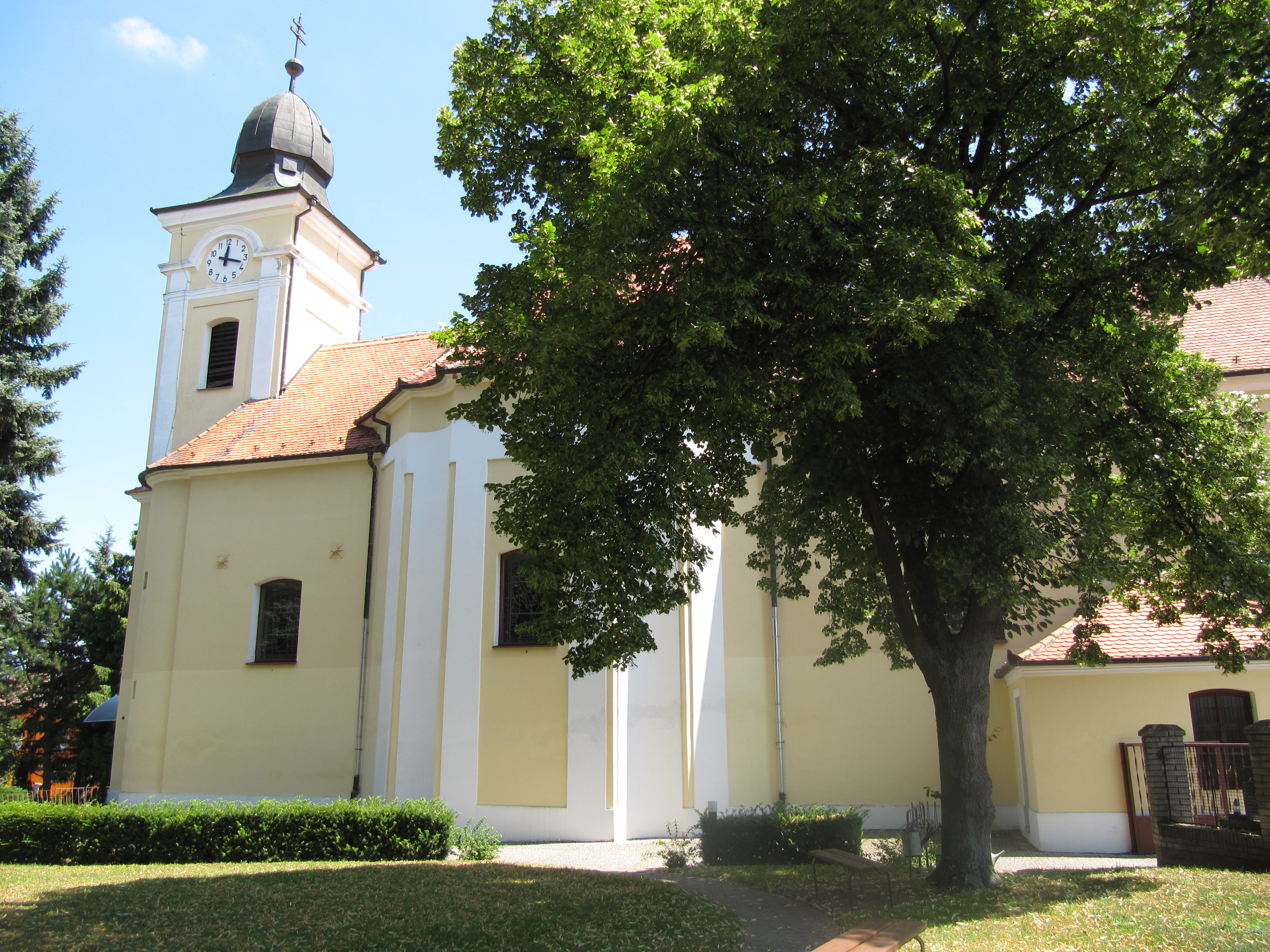
Church of Saint Isidore

The main landmark of Prušánky is the Church of Saint Isidore. It was built in the Baroque style in 1712 as a chapel. In 1751–1758, the chapel was extended into the church.
