= Archlebov =

- Municipality
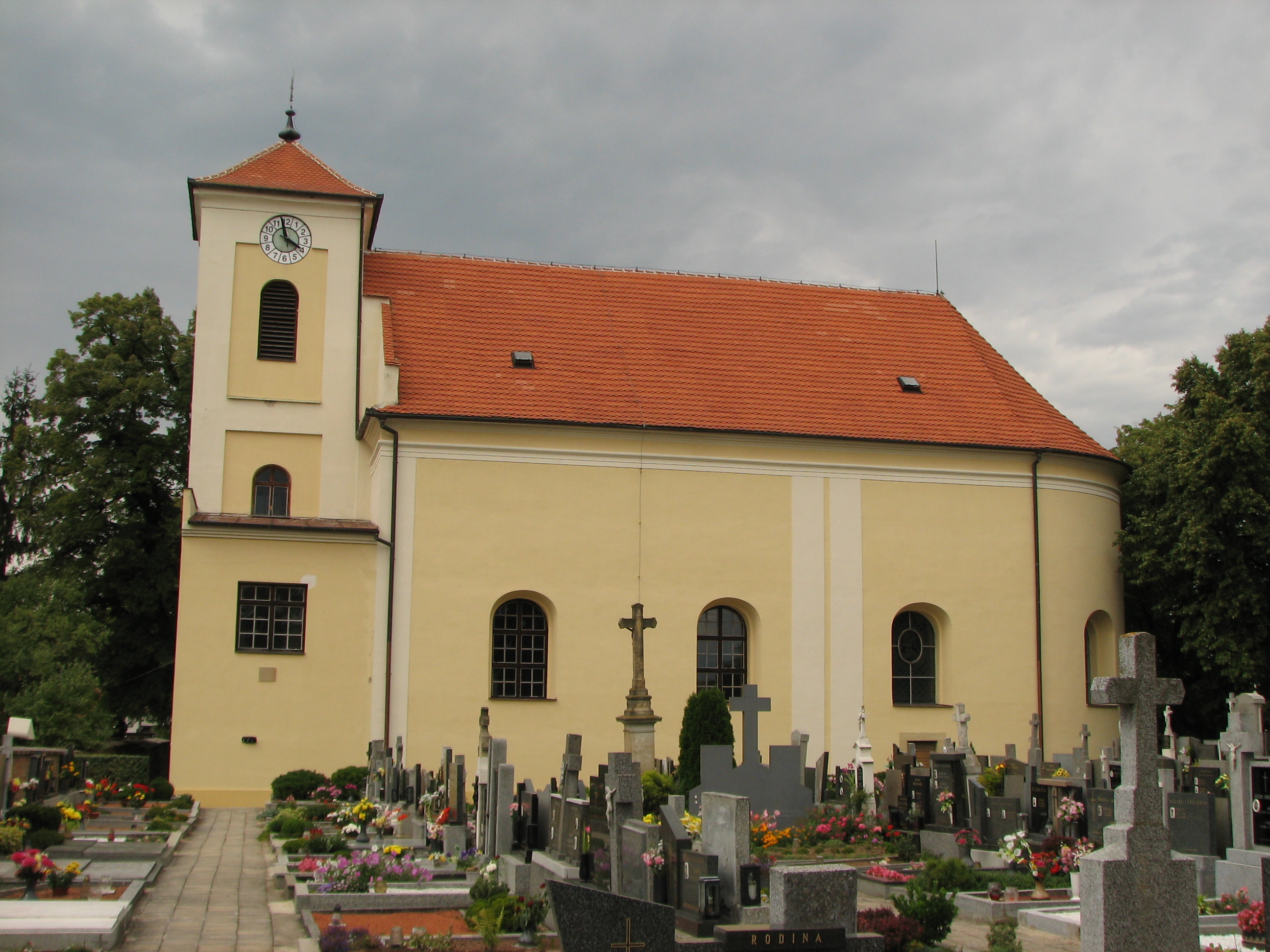
- Church of Saints Roch and Sebastian

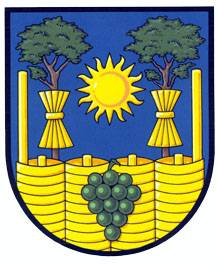
- Flag Coat of arms

- Location in the Czech Republic
- Coordinates: 49°2′37″N 17°0′17″E
- Country: Czech Republic
- Region: South Moravian
- District: Hodonín
- First mentioned: 1349

Area
  - Total: 13.33 km^{2} (5.15 sq mi)
- Elevation: 227 m (745 ft)

Population (2026-01-01)
  - Total: 865
  - Density: 64.9/km^{2} (168/sq mi)
- Time zone: UTC+1 (CET)
  - Summer (DST): UTC+2 (CEST)
- Postal code: 696 33
- Website: www.obecarchlebov.cz

Archlebov (German: Archlebau) is a municipality and village in Hodonín District in the South Moravian Region of the Czech Republic. It has about 900 inhabitants.

It is located 25 kilometres (16 mi) northwest of Hodonín.

== Demographics ==
Historical population
Year	Pop.	±%
1869	994	—
1880	1,128	+13.5%
1890	1,184	+5.0%
1900	1,214	+2.5%
1910	1,278	+5.3%
1921	1,327	+3.8%
1930	1,262	−4.9%
1950	1,192	−5.5%
1961	1,288	+8.1%
1970	1,142	−11.3%
1980	1,002	−12.3%
1991	906	−9.6%
2001	908	+0.2%
2011	850	−6.4%
2021	842	−0.9%
Source: Censuses
