= Boršice u Blatnice =

- Municipality
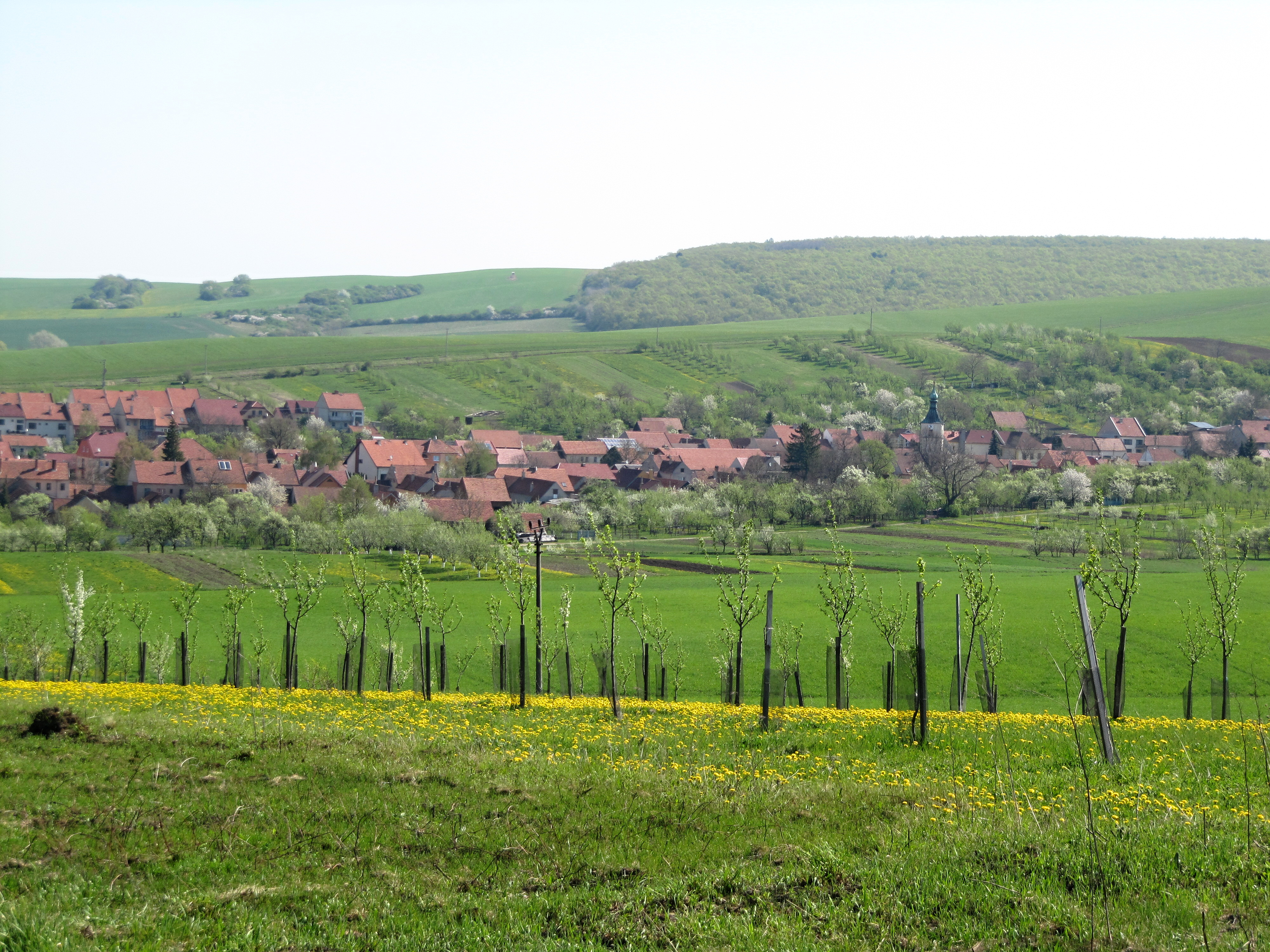
- General view

- Flag Coat of arms

- Location in the Czech Republic
- Coordinates: 48°55′56″N 17°34′33″E
- Country: Czech Republic
- Region: Zlín
- District: Uherské Hradiště
- First mentioned: 1283

Area
  - Total: 11.62 km^{2} (4.49 sq mi)
- Elevation: 298 m (978 ft)

Population (2026-01-01)
  - Total: 815
  - Density: 70.1/km^{2} (182/sq mi)
- Time zone: UTC+1 (CET)
  - Summer (DST): UTC+2 (CEST)
- Postal code: 687 63
- Website: www.obecborsiceublatnice.cz

Boršice u Blatnice is a municipality and village in Uherské Hradiště District in the Zlín Region of the Czech Republic. It has about 800 inhabitants.

Boršice u Blatnice lies approximately 18 kilometres (11 mi) south-east of Uherské Hradiště, 35 km (22 mi) south of Zlín, and 262 km (163 mi) south-east of Prague.

== Demographics ==
Historical population
Year	Pop.	±%
1869	766	—
1880	753	−1.7%
1890	850	+12.9%
1900	853	+0.4%
1910	987	+15.7%
1921	993	+0.6%
1930	987	−0.6%
1950	923	−6.5%
1961	1,025	+11.1%
1970	947	−7.6%
1980	966	+2.0%
1991	892	−7.7%
2001	860	−3.6%
2011	823	−4.3%
2021	780	−5.2%
Source: Censuses
