= Svatobořice-Mistřín =

- Municipality
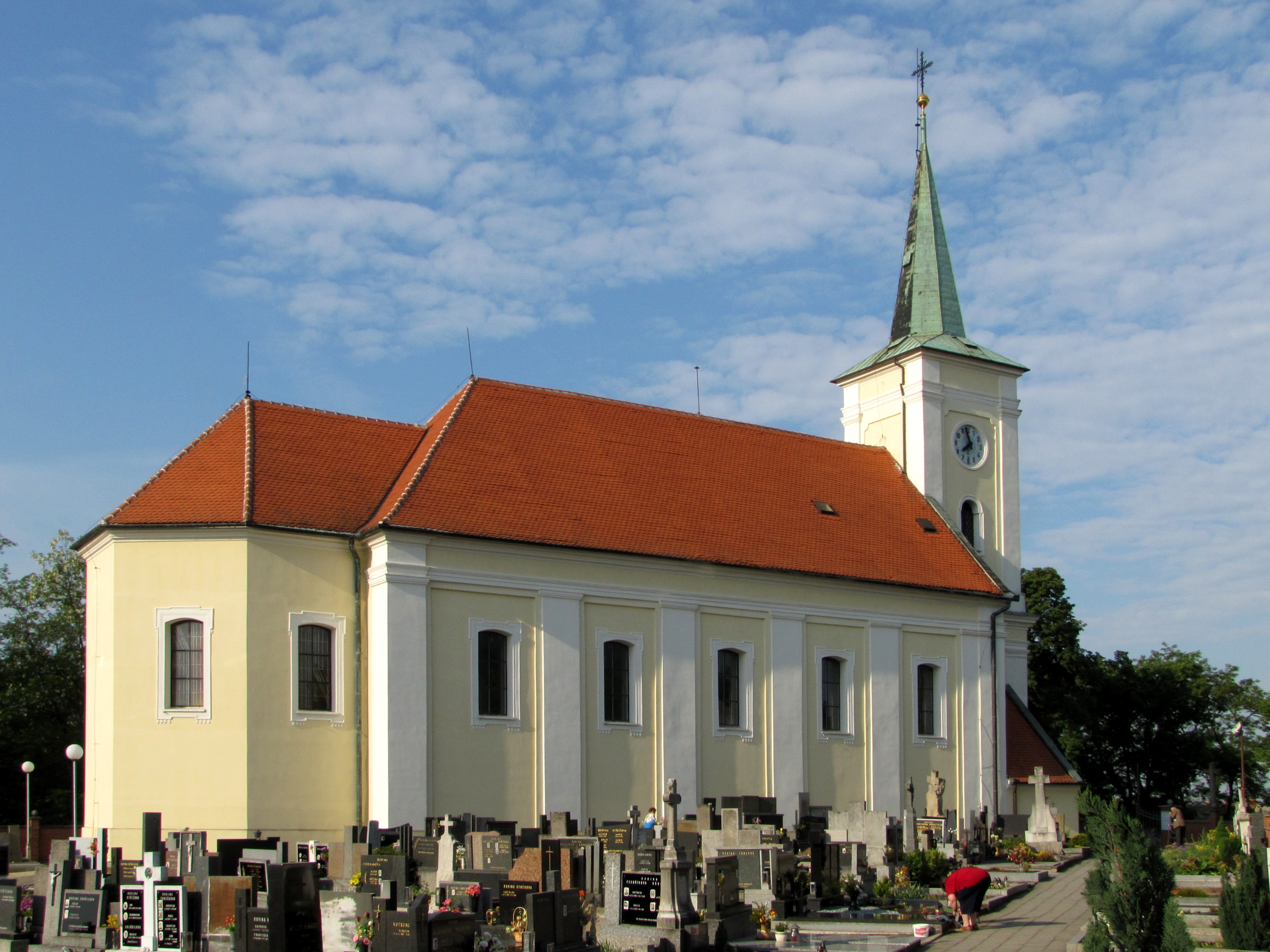
- Church of the Visitation of the Virgin Mary

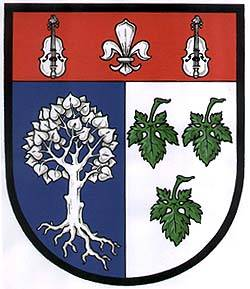
- Flag Coat of arms

- Location in the Czech Republic
- Coordinates: 48°58′39″N 17°5′20″E
- Country: Czech Republic
- Region: South Moravian
- District: Hodonín
- First mentioned: 1228

Area
  - Total: 23.12 km^{2} (8.93 sq mi)
- Elevation: 193 m (633 ft)

Population (2026-01-01)
  - Total: 3,557
  - Density: 153.8/km^{2} (398.5/sq mi)
- Time zone: UTC+1 (CET)
  - Summer (DST): UTC+2 (CEST)
- Postal code: 696 04
- Website: www.svatoborice-mistrin.cz

Svatobořice-Mistřín (Czech pronunciation: [ˈsvatobor̝ɪtsɛ ˈmɪstr̝̊iːn]) is a municipality in Hodonín District in the South Moravian Region of the Czech Republic. It has about 3,600 inhabitants.

== Administrative division ==
Svatobořice-Mistřín consists of two municipal parts (in brackets population according to the 2021 census):

- Svatobořice (1,902)
- Mistřín (1,492)

== Geography ==
Svatobořice-Mistřín is located about 13 kilometres (8 mi) north of Hodonín and 41 km (25 mi) southeast of Brno. It lies in the Kyjov Hills. The highest point is the hill Záviště at 256 m (840 ft) above sea level. The Kyjovka River flows through the municipality.

== History ==
The first written mention of Mistřín is in a 1228 deed of King Ottokar I of Bohemia through which it was donated to the monastery in Velehrad. Svatobořice was first mentioned in 1349, however it is probably older than Mistřín. The two formerly separate municipalities merged in 1964.

== Demographics ==
Historical population

Year	Pop.	±%
1869	1,724	—
1880	1,861	+7.9%
1890	1,969	+5.8%
1900	2,337	+18.7%
1910	2,686	+14.9%

Year	Pop.	±%
1921	2,964	+10.3%
1930	3,823	+29.0%
1950	3,069	−19.7%
1961	3,521	+14.7%
1970	3,593	+2.0%

Year	Pop.	±%
1980	3,646	+1.5%
1991	3,486	−4.4%
2001	3,483	−0.1%
2011	3,419	−1.8%
2021	3,394	−0.7%

Source: Censuses

== Economy ==
Svatobořice-Mistřín is known for viticulture and winemaking. The municipality lies in the Slovácká wine subregion.

== Transport ==
There are no railways or major roads passing through the municipality.

== Sights ==
The main landmark of Mistřín is the Church of the Visitation of the Virgin Mary. The construction of this Baroque church began in 1744 and was finished in 1769–1771, when the cemetery was established. It replaced an old Romanesque church.

In Svatobořice is the Svatobořice Castle. It was built after 1570, during the rule of the Morkovsky of Zástřizly family. The Kurucs burned the castle down in 1705, but it was rebuilt by the Serényi family. Today it is privately owned and inaccessible.

== Notable people ==
- Vladimír Vašíček (1919–2003), painter
