= Kelčany =

- Municipality
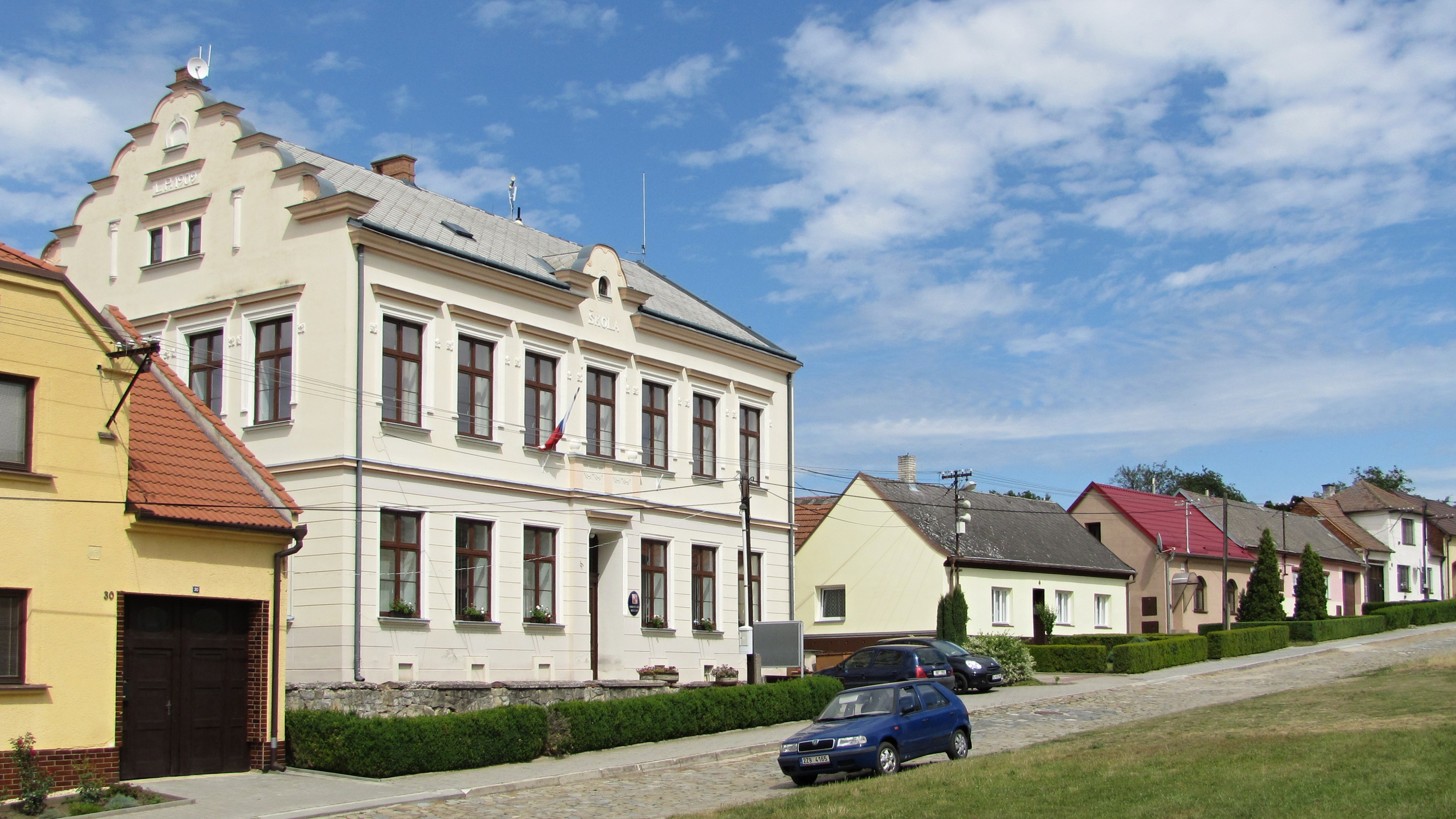
- Municipal office

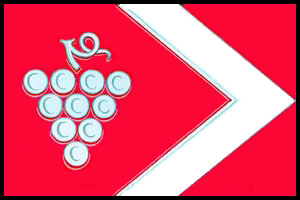
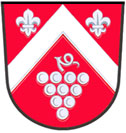
- Flag Coat of arms

- Location in the Czech Republic
- Coordinates: 49°0′19″N 17°10′26″E
- Country: Czech Republic
- Region: South Moravian
- District: Hodonín
- First mentioned: 1365

Area
  - Total: 2.61 km^{2} (1.01 sq mi)
- Elevation: 203 m (666 ft)

Population (2026-01-01)
  - Total: 241
  - Density: 92.3/km^{2} (239/sq mi)
- Time zone: UTC+1 (CET)
  - Summer (DST): UTC+2 (CEST)
- Postal code: 696 49
- Website: www.kelcany.cz

Kelčany (German: Keltschan) is a municipality and village in Hodonín District in the South Moravian Region of the Czech Republic. It has about 200 inhabitants.

Kelčany lies approximately 18 kilometres (11 mi) north of Hodonín, 47 km (29 mi) south-east of Brno, and 233 km (145 mi) south-east of Prague.

== Demographics ==
Historical population
Year	Pop.	±%
1869	428	—
1880	376	−12.1%
1890	387	+2.9%
1900	406	+4.9%
1910	455	+12.1%
1921	445	−2.2%
1930	410	−7.9%
1950	288	−29.8%
1961	349	+21.2%
1970	286	−18.1%
1980	257	−10.1%
1991	207	−19.5%
2001	250	+20.8%
2011	229	−8.4%
2021	225	−1.7%
Source: Censuses
