= Hovorany =

- Municipality
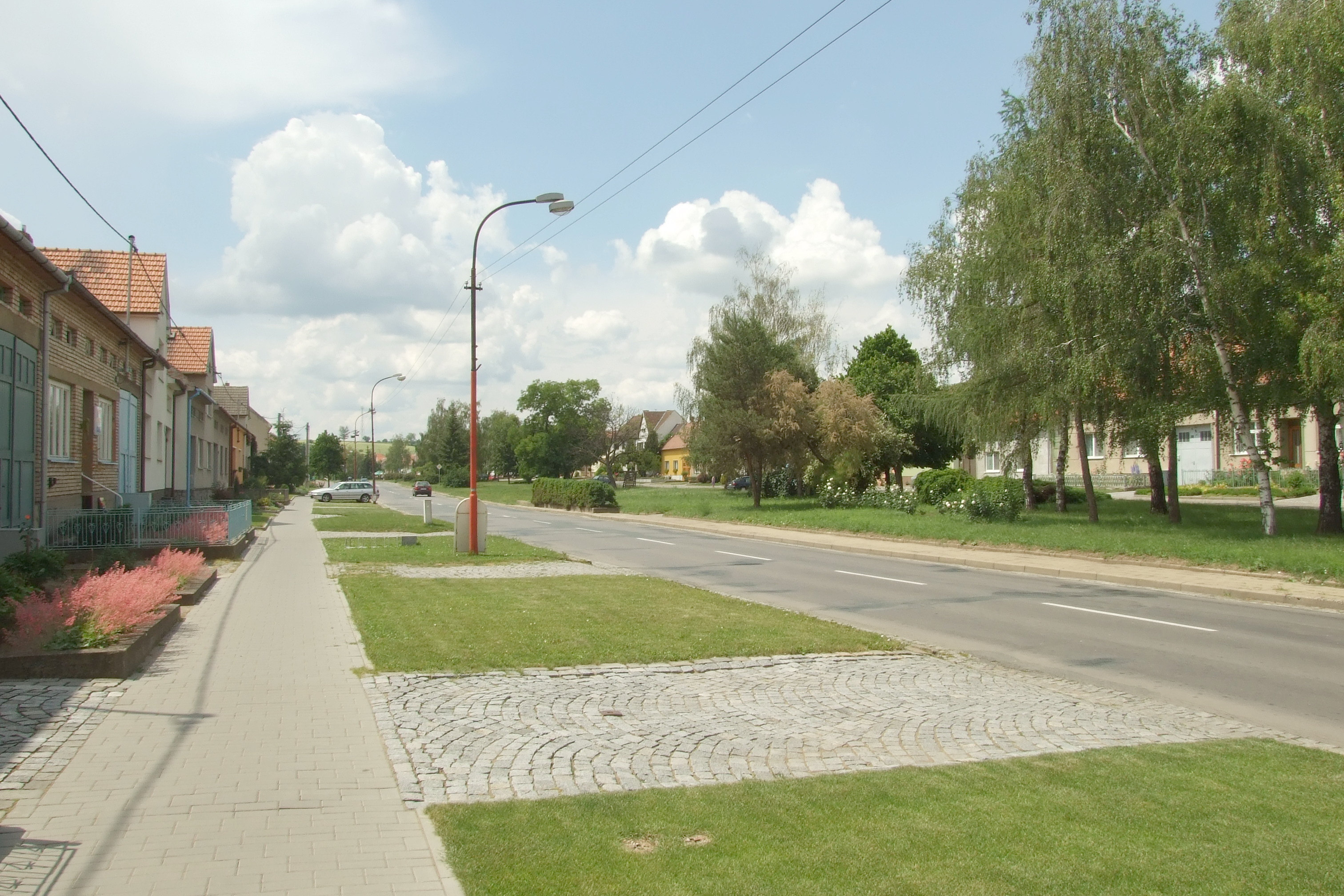
- Centre of Hovorany

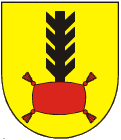
- Flag Coat of arms

- Location in the Czech Republic
- Coordinates: 48°57′18″N 16°59′36″E
- Country: Czech Republic
- Region: South Moravian
- District: Hodonín
- First mentioned: 1593

Area
  - Total: 20.99 km^{2} (8.10 sq mi)
- Elevation: 193 m (633 ft)

Population (2026-01-01)
  - Total: 2,155
  - Density: 102.7/km^{2} (265.9/sq mi)
- Time zone: UTC+1 (CET)
  - Summer (DST): UTC+2 (CEST)
- Postal code: 696 12
- Website: www.obec-hovorany.cz

Hovorany (German: Howoran) is a municipality and village in Hodonín District in the South Moravian Region of the Czech Republic. It has about 2,200 inhabitants.

== Geography ==
Hovorany is located about 14 kilometres (9 mi) northwest of Hodonín and 37 km (23 mi) southeast of Brno. It lies in the Kyjov Hills. The highest point is a hill at 281 m (922 ft) above sea level.

== History ==
The first written mention of Hovorany is from 1593. It was founded by Jan IV of Lipá, who allowed Croat migrants to settle on his Hodonín estate. The Croats then gradually assimilated. Hovorany suffered greatly in 1605 (during the Bocskai uprising) and during the Thirty Years' War.

== Demographics ==
Historical population

Year	Pop.	±%
1869	1,601	—
1880	1,709	+6.7%
1890	1,715	+0.4%
1900	1,961	+14.3%
1910	2,160	+10.1%

Year	Pop.	±%
1921	2,320	+7.4%
1930	2,361	+1.8%
1950	2,295	−2.8%
1961	2,482	+8.1%
1970	2,459	−0.9%

Year	Pop.	±%
1980	2,443	−0.7%
1991	2,268	−7.2%
2001	2,221	−2.1%
2011	2,137	−3.8%
2021	2,124	−0.6%

Source: Censuses

== Economy ==
Hovorany is known for viticulture. The municipality lies in the Slovácká wine subregion.

== Transport ==
There are no railways or major roads passing through the municipality.

== Sights ==
The main landmark of Hovorany is the Church of Saint John the Baptist. It was built in the Baroque style in 1721–1725.
