= Huštěnovice =

- Municipality
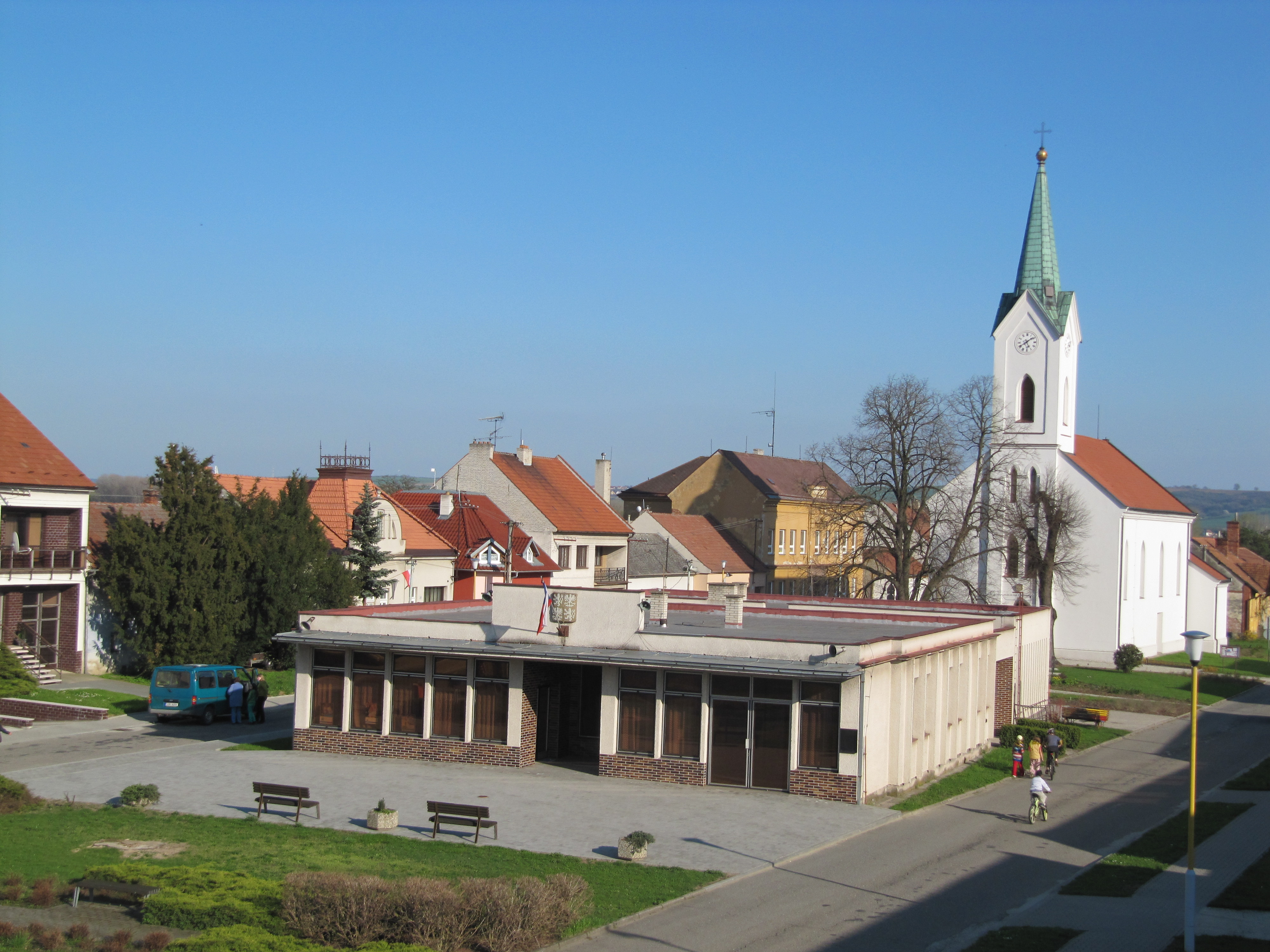
- Municipal office and Church of Saint Anne

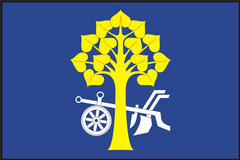
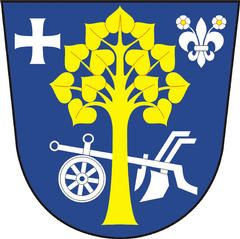
- Flag Coat of arms

- Location in the Czech Republic
- Coordinates: 49°6′29″N 17°27′52″E
- Country: Czech Republic
- Region: Zlín
- District: Uherské Hradiště
- First mentioned: 1220

Area
  - Total: 6.60 km^{2} (2.55 sq mi)
- Elevation: 186 m (610 ft)

Population (2026-01-01)
  - Total: 1,031
  - Density: 156/km^{2} (405/sq mi)
- Time zone: UTC+1 (CET)
  - Summer (DST): UTC+2 (CEST)
- Postal code: 687 03
- Website: www.hustenovice.cz

Huštěnovice is a municipality and village in Uherské Hradiště District in the Zlín Region of the Czech Republic. It has about 1,000 inhabitants.

Huštěnovice lies approximately 5 kilometres (3 mi) north of Uherské Hradiště, 21 km (13 mi) south-west of Zlín, and 246 km (153 mi) south-east of Prague.

== Demographics ==
Historical population
Year	Pop.	±%
1869	833	—
1880	956	+14.8%
1890	909	−4.9%
1900	968	+6.5%
1910	936	−3.3%
1921	1,013	+8.2%
1930	1,093	+7.9%
1950	1,158	+5.9%
1961	1,254	+8.3%
1970	1,186	−5.4%
1980	1,068	−9.9%
1991	1,024	−4.1%
2001	1,002	−2.1%
2011	938	−6.4%
2021	945	+0.7%
Source: Censuses
