= Tasov (Hodonín District) =

- Municipality
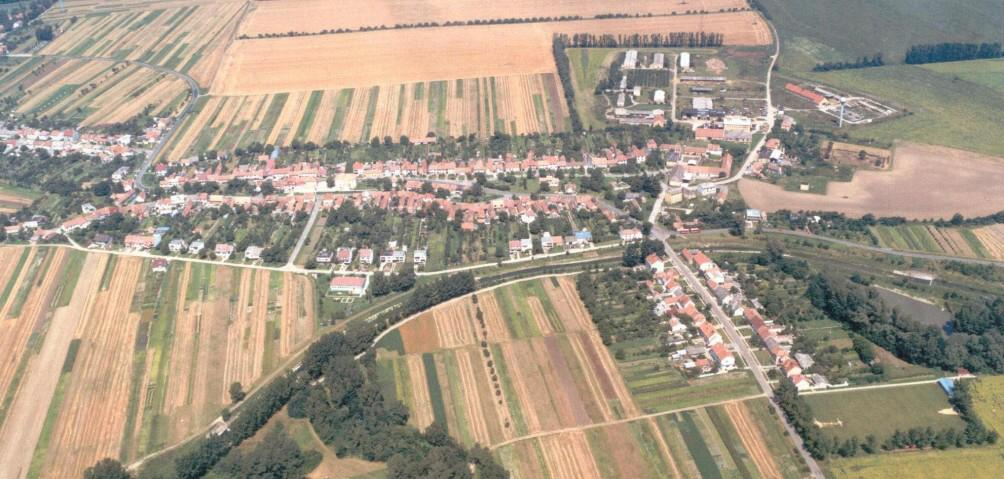
- Aerial view

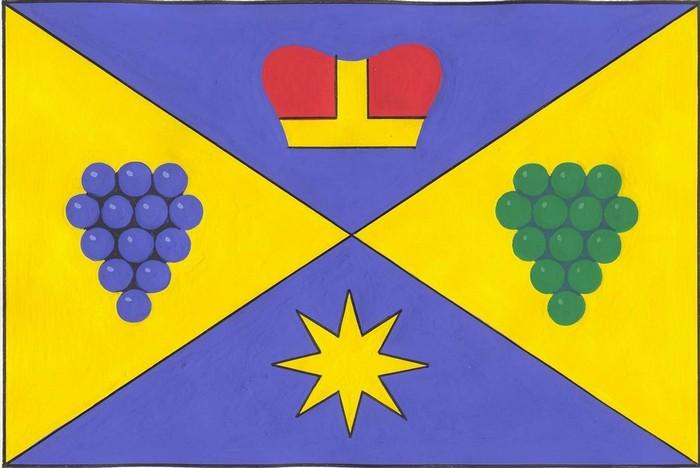
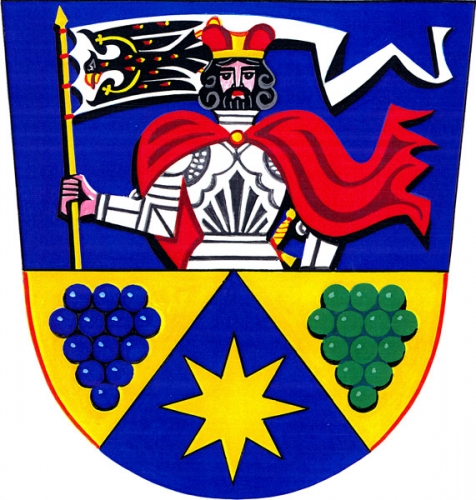
- Flag Coat of arms

- Location in the Czech Republic
- Coordinates: 48°54′25″N 17°25′47″E
- Country: Czech Republic
- Region: South Moravian
- District: Hodonín
- First mentioned: 1217

Area
  - Total: 6.37 km^{2} (2.46 sq mi)
- Elevation: 203 m (666 ft)

Population (2026-01-01)
  - Total: 502
  - Density: 78.8/km^{2} (204/sq mi)
- Time zone: UTC+1 (CET)
  - Summer (DST): UTC+2 (CEST)
- Postal code: 696 63
- Website: www.tasov-ho.cz

Tasov is a municipality and village in Hodonín District in the South Moravian Region of the Czech Republic. It has about 500 inhabitants.

Tasov lies approximately 24 kilometres (15 mi) east of Hodonín, 69 km (43 mi) south-east of Brno, and 256 km (159 mi) south-east of Prague.

== History ==
The first written mention of Tasov is from 1217.

== Demographics ==
Historical population
Year	Pop.	±%
1869	632	—
1880	725	+14.7%
1890	746	+2.9%
1900	722	−3.2%
1910	847	+17.3%
1921	746	−11.9%
1930	606	−18.8%
1950	538	−11.2%
1961	595	+10.6%
1970	585	−1.7%
1980	590	+0.9%
1991	552	−6.4%
2001	554	+0.4%
2011	523	−5.6%
2021	524	+0.2%
Source: Censuses
