= Nedakonice =

- Municipality
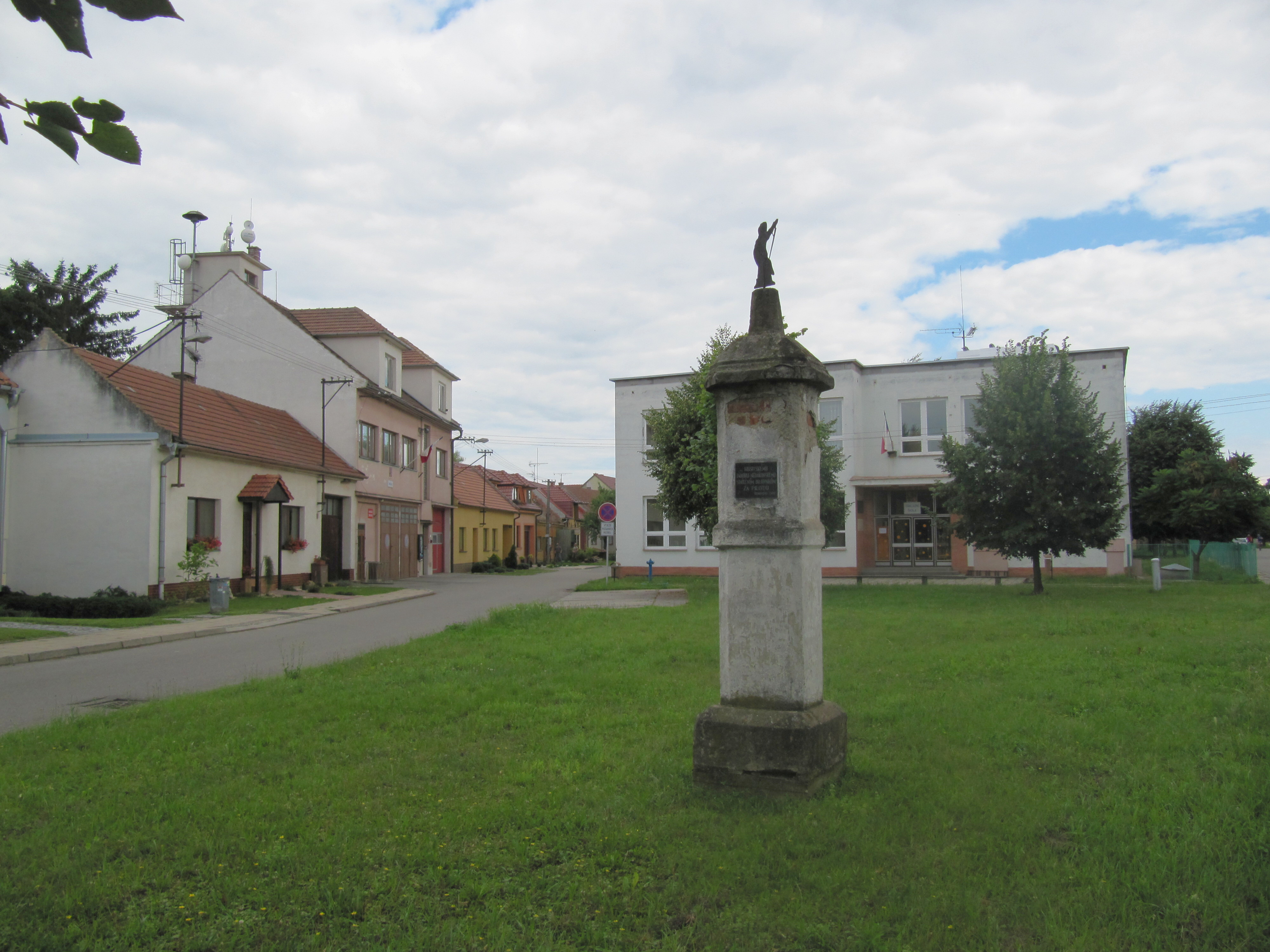
- Centre of Nedakonice with a column shrine

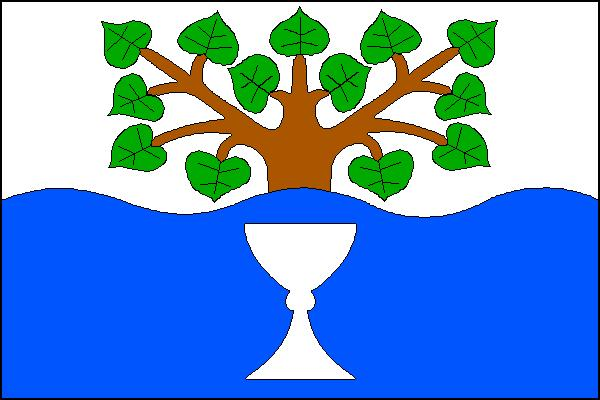
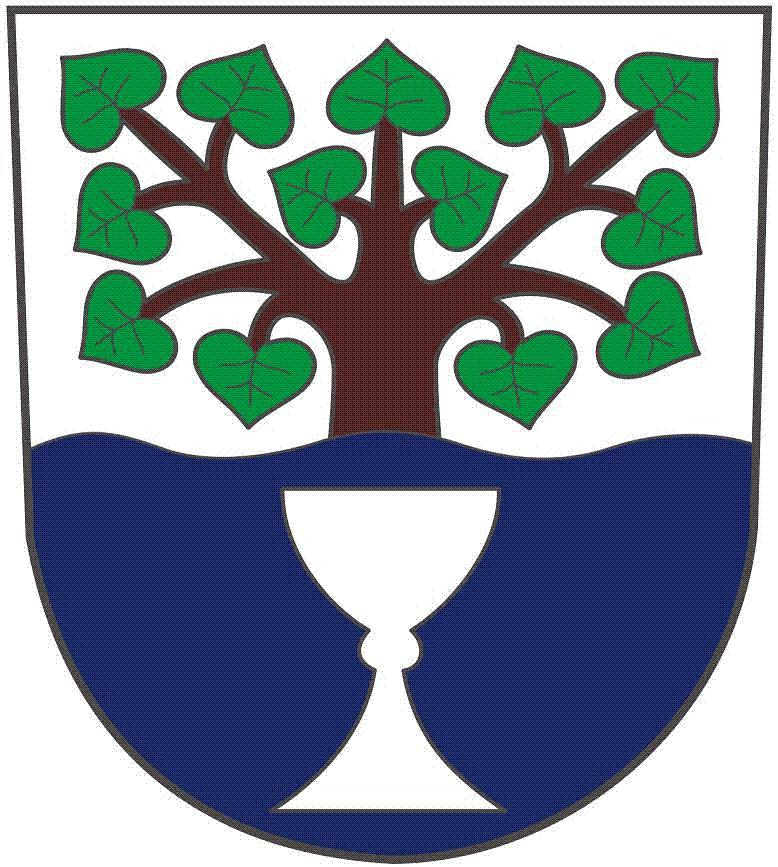
- Flag Coat of arms

- Location in the Czech Republic
- Coordinates: 49°1′54″N 17°22′53″E
- Country: Czech Republic
- Region: Zlín
- District: Uherské Hradiště
- First mentioned: 1220

Area
  - Total: 8.39 km^{2} (3.24 sq mi)
- Elevation: 178 m (584 ft)

Population (2026-01-01)
  - Total: 1,634
  - Density: 195/km^{2} (504/sq mi)
- Time zone: UTC+1 (CET)
  - Summer (DST): UTC+2 (CEST)
- Postal code: 687 38
- Website: www.obecnedakonice.cz

Nedakonice is a municipality and village in Uherské Hradiště District in the Zlín Region of the Czech Republic. It has about 1,600 inhabitants.

== Geography ==
Nedakonice is located about 7 kilometres (4 mi) southwest of Uherské Hradiště and 29 km (18 mi) southwest of Zlín. It lies in the Lower Morava Valley. The municipality is situated on the right bank of the Morava River, which forms the eastern municipal border. The stream Dlouhá řeka flows through the village.

== History ==
The first written mention of Nedakonice is from 1220. The village was a property of the monastery in Velehrad until the abolition of the monastery in 1784.

== Demographics ==
Historical population

Year	Pop.	±%
1869	1,085	—
1880	1,061	−2.2%
1890	1,087	+2.5%
1900	1,176	+8.2%
1910	1,312	+11.6%

Year	Pop.	±%
1921	1,378	+5.0%
1930	1,233	−10.5%
1950	1,311	+6.3%
1961	1,511	+15.3%
1970	1,539	+1.9%

Year	Pop.	±%
1980	1,451	−5.7%
1991	1,443	−0.6%
2001	1,499	+3.9%
2011	1,525	+1.7%
2021	1,535	+0.7%

Source: Censuses

== Transport ==
Nedakonice is located on the railway line Přerov–Břeclav.

== Sights ==
Among the protected cultural monuments are a statue of St. John of Nepomuk dating from 1740, and a column shrine, which is connected with the Hussite Wars.

The main landmark of Nedakonice is the Church of Saint Florian. It was built in 1934.
