= Ježov =

Ježov may refer to places in the Czech Republic:

- Ježov (Hodonín District), a municipality and village in the South Moravian Region
- Ježov (Pelhřimov District), a municipality and village in the Vysočina Region
