= Syrovín =

- Municipality
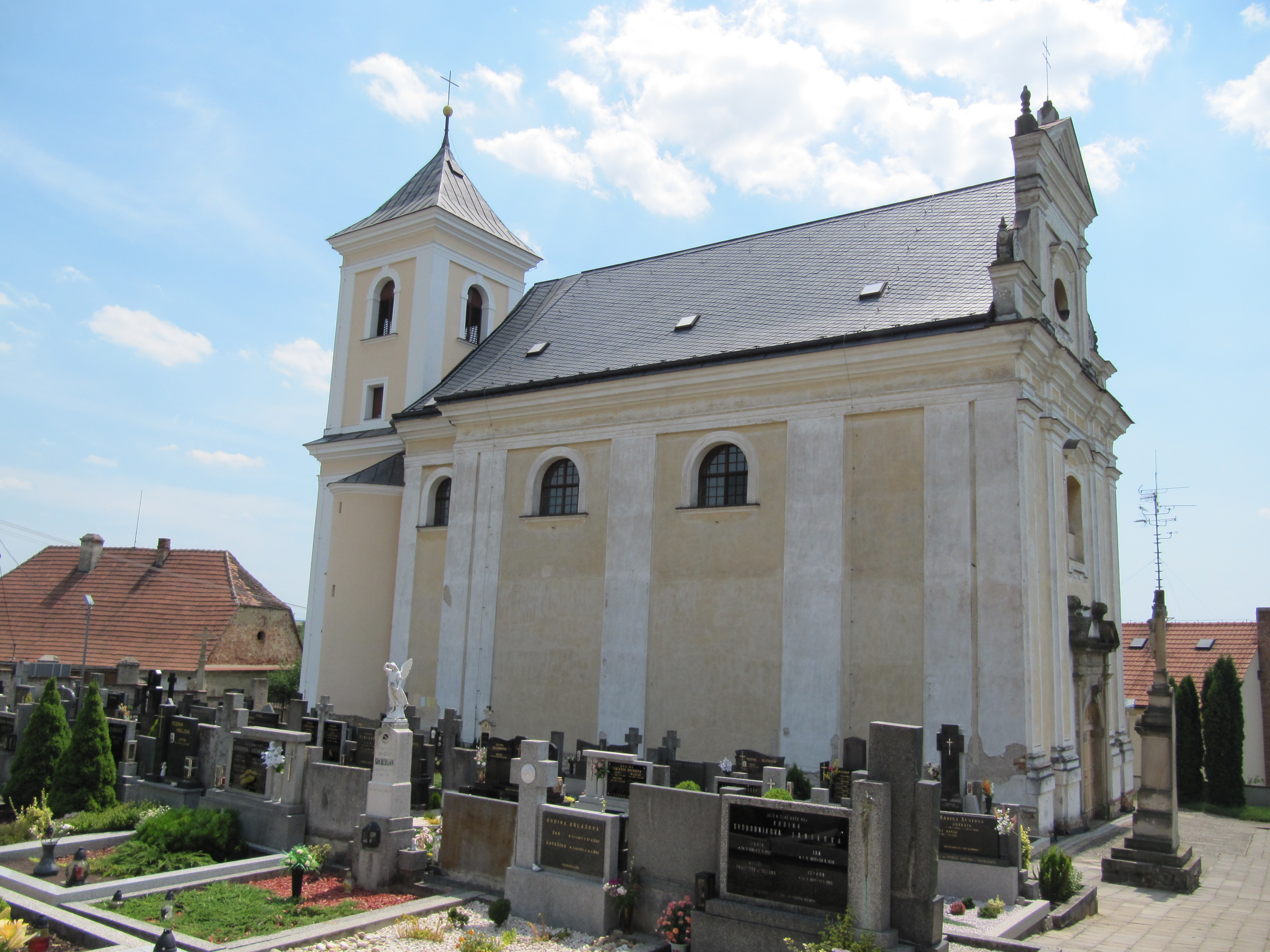
- Church of the Conversion of Saint Paul

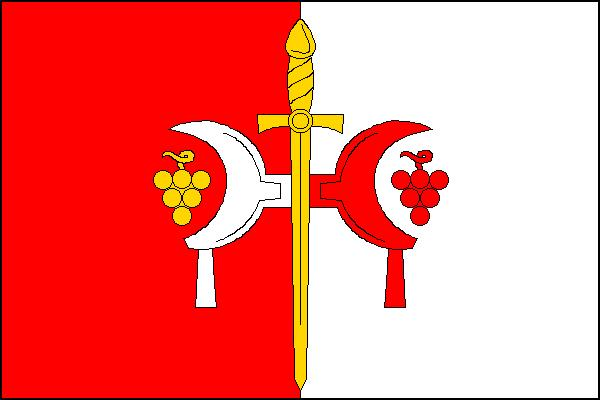
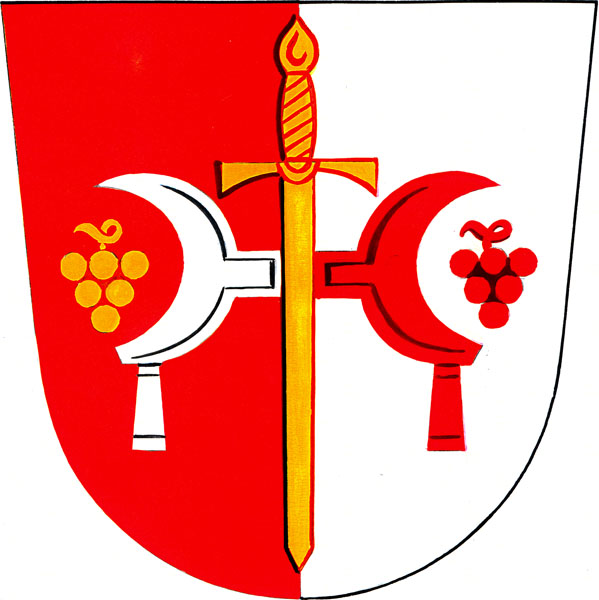
- Flag Coat of arms

- Location in the Czech Republic
- Coordinates: 49°1′33″N 17°15′50″E
- Country: Czech Republic
- Region: South Moravian
- District: Hodonín
- First mentioned: 1371

Area
  - Total: 4.08 km^{2} (1.58 sq mi)
- Elevation: 244 m (801 ft)

Population (2026-01-01)
  - Total: 370
  - Density: 91/km^{2} (230/sq mi)
- Time zone: UTC+1 (CET)
  - Summer (DST): UTC+2 (CEST)
- Postal code: 696 84
- Website: www.syrovin.cz

Syrovín is a municipality and village in Hodonín District in the South Moravian Region of the Czech Republic. It has about 400 inhabitants.

Syrovín lies approximately 22 kilometres (14 mi) north-east of Hodonín, 51 km (32 mi) south-east of Brno, and 237 km (147 mi) south-east of Prague.

== Demographics ==
Historical population
Year	Pop.	±%
1869	641	—
1880	709	+10.6%
1890	686	−3.2%
1900	757	+10.3%
1910	760	+0.4%
1921	712	−6.3%
1930	696	−2.2%
1950	594	−14.7%
1961	621	+4.5%
1970	557	−10.3%
1980	490	−12.0%
1991	413	−15.7%
2001	405	−1.9%
2011	362	−10.6%
2021	341	−5.8%
Source: Censuses
