= Labuty =

- Municipality
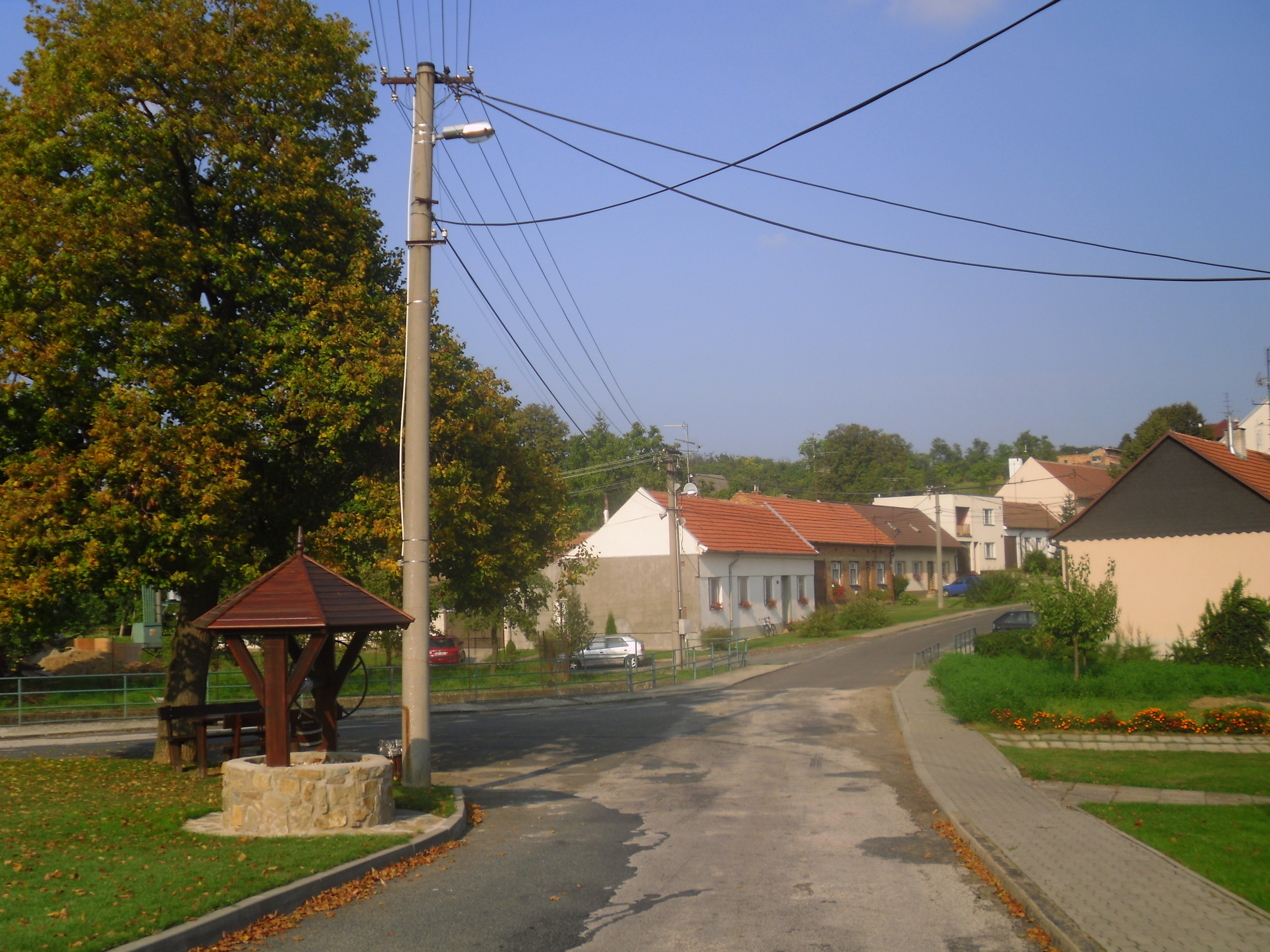
- Centre of Labuty

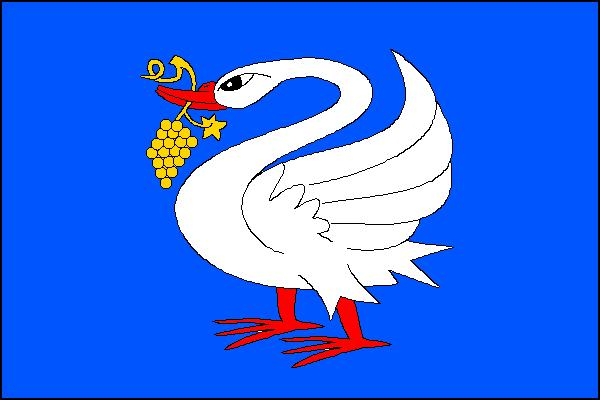
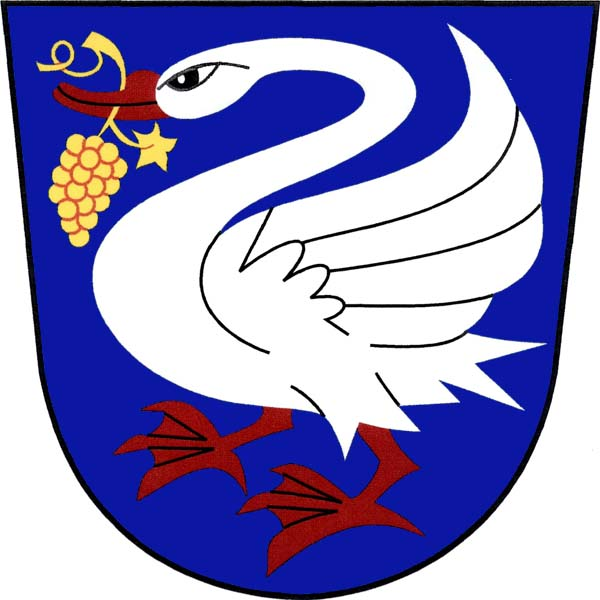
- Flag Coat of arms

- Location in the Czech Republic
- Coordinates: 49°2′48″N 17°12′52″E
- Country: Czech Republic
- Region: South Moravian
- District: Hodonín
- First mentioned: 1351

Area
  - Total: 2.29 km^{2} (0.88 sq mi)
- Elevation: 253 m (830 ft)

Population (2026-01-01)
  - Total: 165
  - Density: 72.1/km^{2} (187/sq mi)
- Time zone: UTC+1 (CET)
  - Summer (DST): UTC+2 (CEST)
- Postal code: 696 48
- Website: labuty.cz

Labuty is a municipality and village in Hodonín District in the South Moravian Region of the Czech Republic. It has about 200 inhabitants.

Labuty lies approximately 23 kilometres (14 mi) north of Hodonín, 47 km (29 mi) east of Brno, and 233 km (145 mi) south-east of Prague.

== Demographics ==
Historical population
Year	Pop.	±%
1869	322	—
1880	357	+10.9%
1890	395	+10.6%
1900	424	+7.3%
1910	408	−3.8%
1921	409	+0.2%
1930	402	−1.7%
1950	343	−14.7%
1961	396	+15.5%
1970	347	−12.4%
1980	256	−26.2%
1991	197	−23.0%
2001	175	−11.2%
2011	187	+6.9%
2021	149	−20.3%
Source: Censuses
