= Ostrovánky =

- Municipality
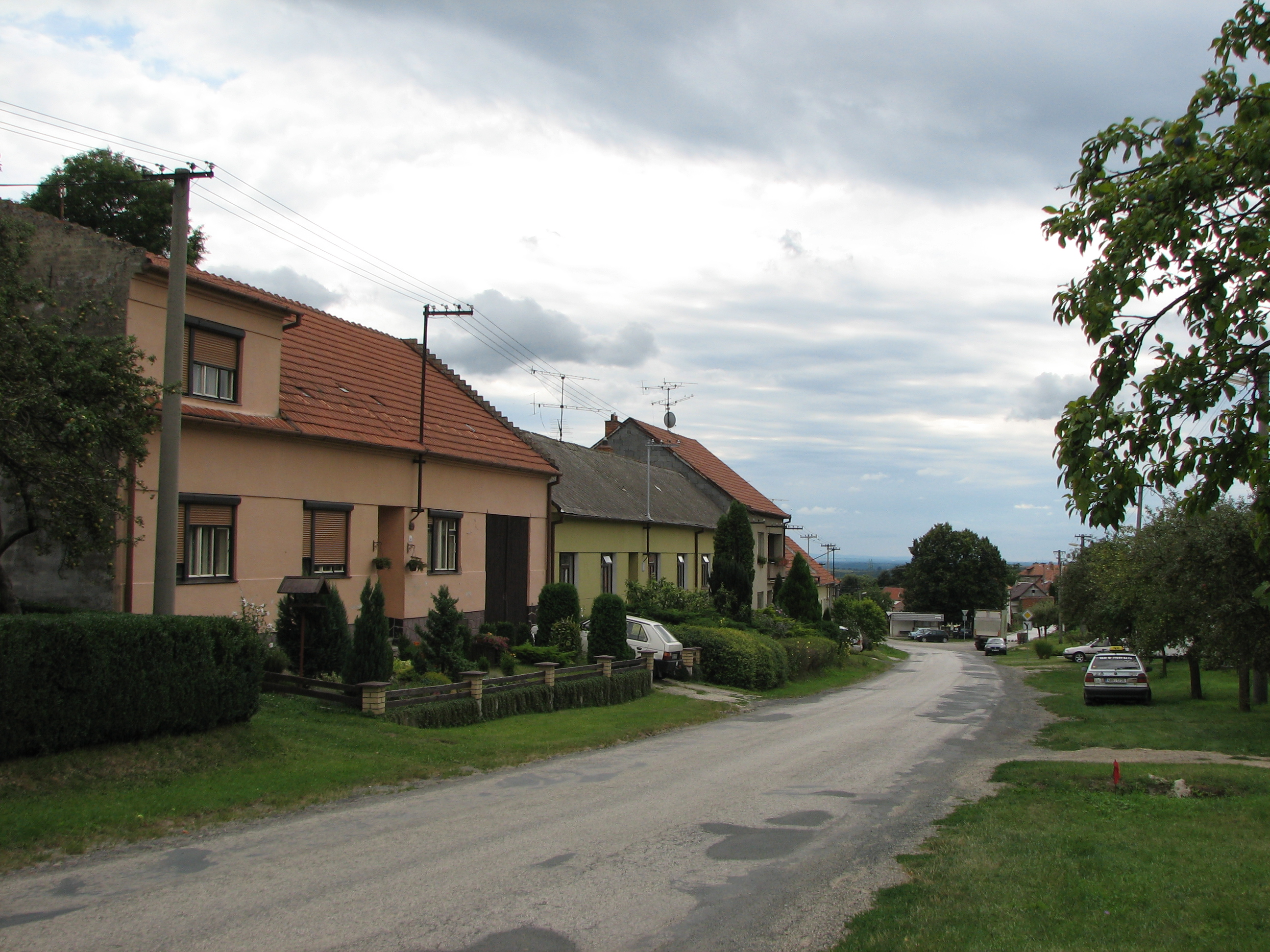
- Main street

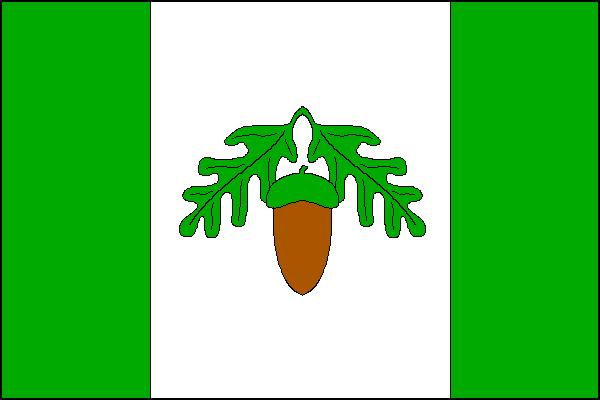
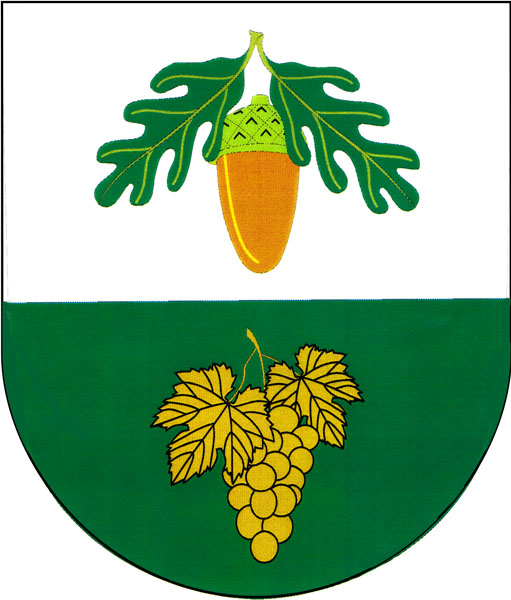
- Flag Coat of arms

- Location in the Czech Republic
- Coordinates: 49°2′34″N 17°4′49″E
- Country: Czech Republic
- Region: South Moravian
- District: Hodonín
- First mentioned: 1141

Area
  - Total: 1.63 km^{2} (0.63 sq mi)
- Elevation: 309 m (1,014 ft)

Population (2026-01-01)
  - Total: 229
  - Density: 140/km^{2} (364/sq mi)
- Time zone: UTC+1 (CET)
  - Summer (DST): UTC+2 (CEST)
- Postal code: 696 31
- Website: www.ostrovanky.cz

Ostrovánky is a municipality and village in Hodonín District in the South Moravian Region of the Czech Republic. It has about 200 inhabitants.

Ostrovánky lies approximately 22 kilometres (14 mi) north of Hodonín, 39 km (24 mi) south-east of Brno, and 225 km (140 mi) south-east of Prague.

== Demographics ==
Historical population
Year	Pop.	±%
1869	216	—
1880	226	+4.6%
1890	237	+4.9%
1900	295	+24.5%
1910	312	+5.8%
1921	299	−4.2%
1930	324	+8.4%
1950	294	−9.3%
1961	315	+7.1%
1970	284	−9.8%
1980	248	−12.7%
1991	225	−9.3%
2001	207	−8.0%
2011	217	+4.8%
2021	222	+2.3%
Source: Censuses
