= Hýsly =

- Municipality
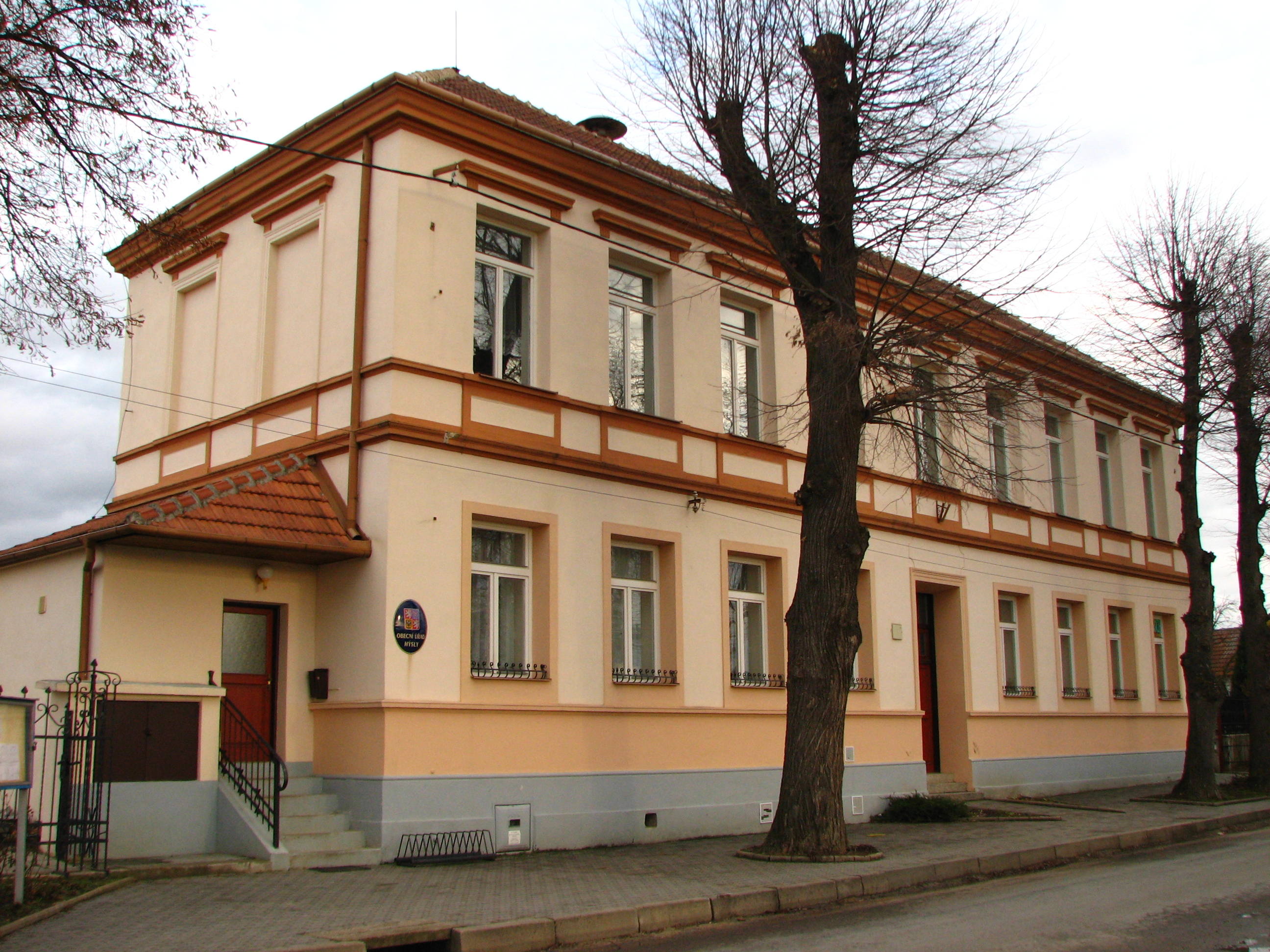
- Municipal office

- Flag Coat of arms

- Location in the Czech Republic
- Coordinates: 49°1′24″N 17°10′47″E
- Country: Czech Republic
- Region: South Moravian
- District: Hodonín
- First mentioned: 1141

Area
  - Total: 8.27 km^{2} (3.19 sq mi)
- Elevation: 224 m (735 ft)

Population (2026-01-01)
  - Total: 404
  - Density: 48.9/km^{2} (127/sq mi)
- Time zone: UTC+1 (CET)
  - Summer (DST): UTC+2 (CEST)
- Postal code: 696 50
- Website: www.hysly.cz

Hýsly (Czech pronunciation: [ˈɦiːslɪ]) is a municipality and village in Hodonín District in the South Moravian Region of the Czech Republic. It has about 400 inhabitants.

== History ==
The first written mention of Hýsly is in a deed of bishop Jindřich Zdík from 1141.

== Demographics ==
Historical population
Year	Pop.	±%
1869	396	—
1880	462	+16.7%
1890	479	+3.7%
1900	560	+16.9%
1910	604	+7.9%
1921	616	+2.0%
1930	486	−21.1%
1950	489	+0.6%
1961	566	+15.7%
1970	494	−12.7%
1980	454	−8.1%
1991	387	−14.8%
2001	394	+1.8%
2011	369	−6.3%
2021	383	+3.8%
Source: Censuses
