= Dražůvky =

- Municipality
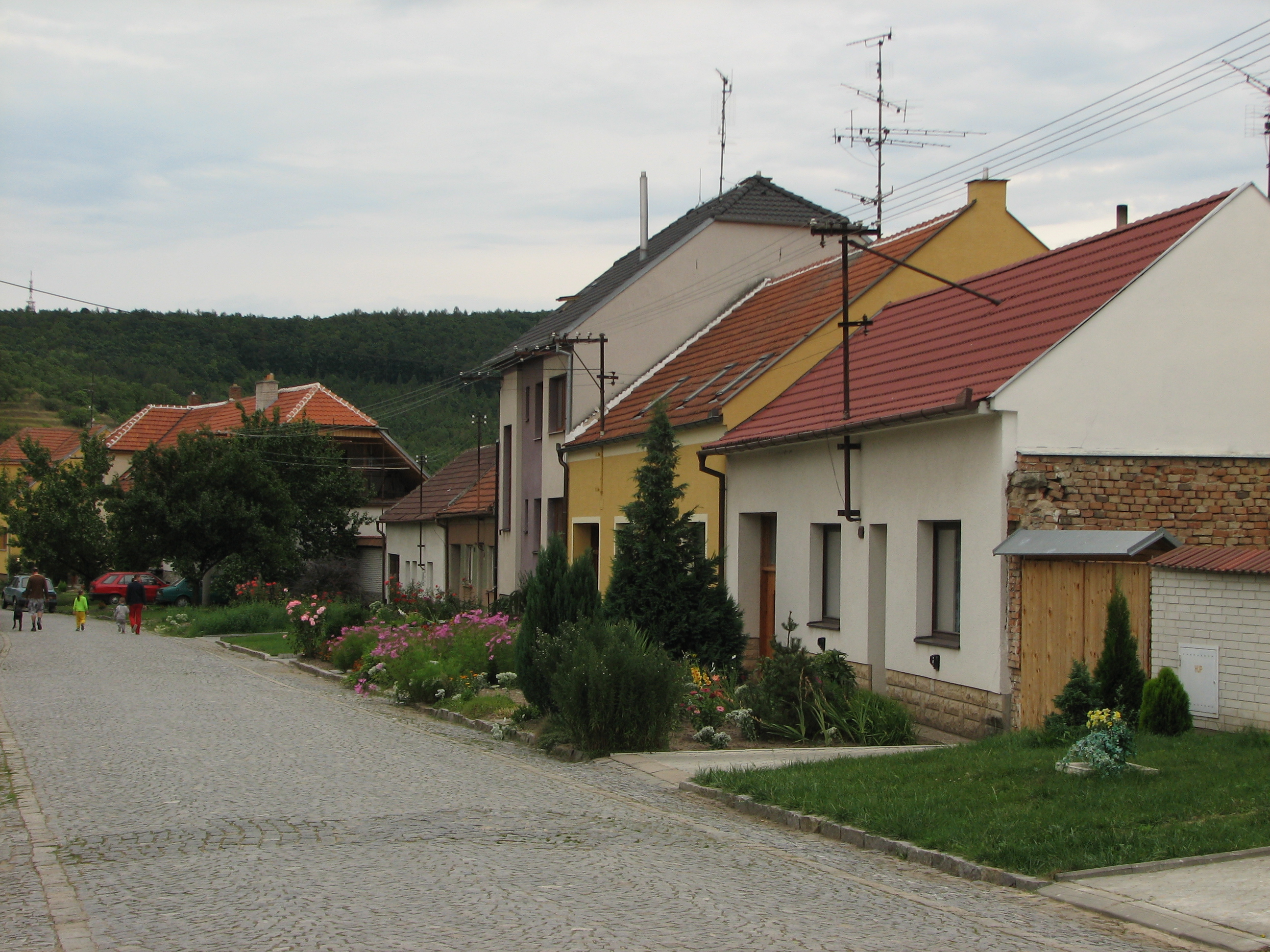
- Main street

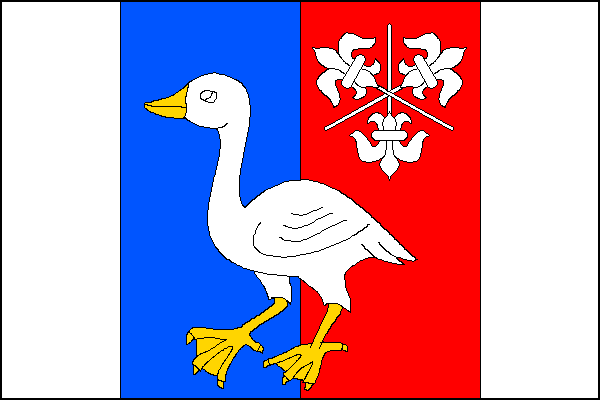
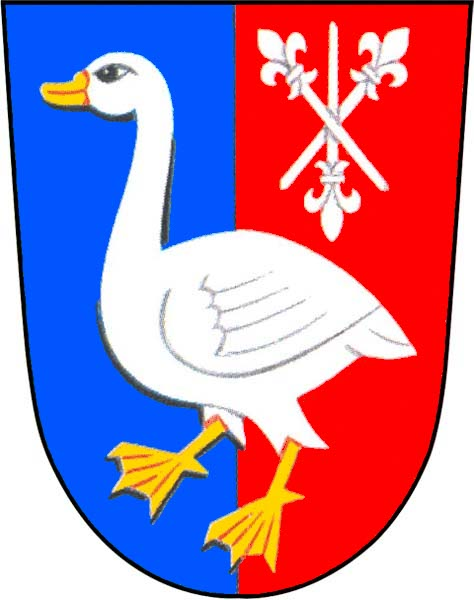
- Flag Coat of arms

- Location in the Czech Republic
- Coordinates: 49°1′50″N 17°1′8″E
- Country: Czech Republic
- Region: South Moravian
- District: Hodonín
- First mentioned: 1340

Area
  - Total: 5.16 km^{2} (1.99 sq mi)
- Elevation: 193 m (633 ft)

Population (2026-01-01)
  - Total: 260
  - Density: 50/km^{2} (130/sq mi)
- Time zone: UTC+1 (CET)
  - Summer (DST): UTC+2 (CEST)
- Postal code: 696 33
- Website: www.drazuvky.cz

Dražůvky (German: Drazuwek) is a municipality and village in Hodonín District in the South Moravian Region of the Czech Republic. It has about 300 inhabitants.

Dražůvky lies approximately 22 kilometres (14 mi) north-west of Hodonín, 36 km (22 mi) south-east of Brno, and 222 km (138 mi) south-east of Prague.

== Demographics ==
Historical population
Year	Pop.	±%
1869	352	—
1880	387	+9.9%
1890	383	−1.0%
1900	371	−3.1%
1910	429	+15.6%
1921	449	+4.7%
1930	437	−2.7%
1950	386	−11.7%
1961	373	−3.4%
1970	372	−0.3%
1980	308	−17.2%
1991	265	−14.0%
2001	259	−2.3%
2011	258	−0.4%
2021	251	−2.7%
Source: Censuses
