= Skalka (Hodonín District) =

- Municipality
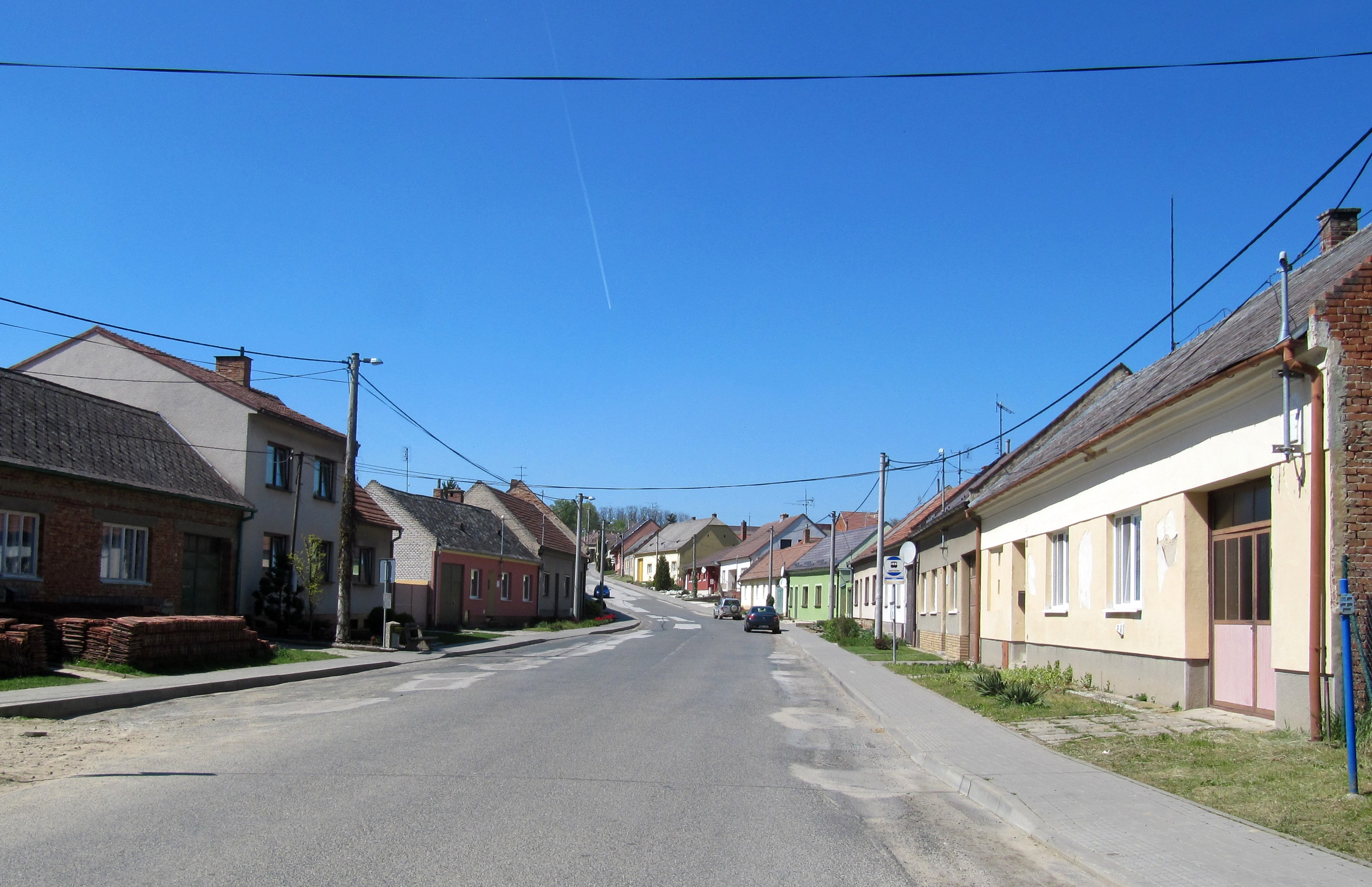
- Main street

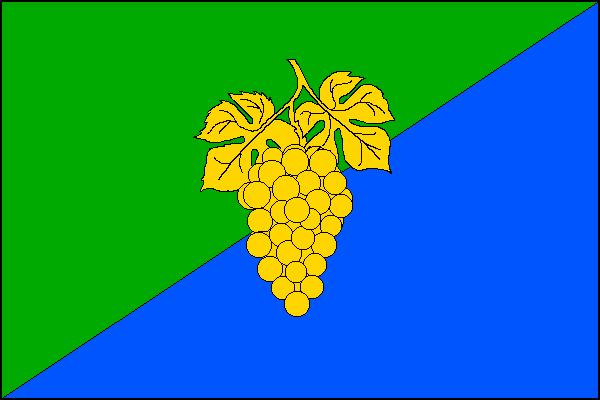
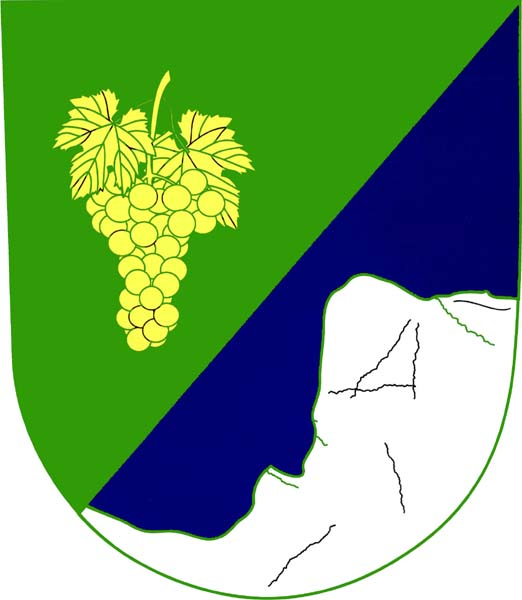
- Flag Coat of arms

- Location in the Czech Republic
- Coordinates: 49°2′9″N 17°12′26″E
- Country: Czech Republic
- Region: South Moravian
- District: Hodonín
- First mentioned: 1318

Area
  - Total: 3.03 km^{2} (1.17 sq mi)
- Elevation: 238 m (781 ft)

Population (2026-01-01)
  - Total: 155
  - Density: 51.2/km^{2} (132/sq mi)
- Time zone: UTC+1 (CET)
  - Summer (DST): UTC+2 (CEST)
- Postal code: 696 48
- Website: www.skalkaobec.cz

Skalka is a municipality and village in Hodonín District in the South Moravian Region of the Czech Republic. It has about 200 inhabitants.

Skalka lies approximately 22 kilometres (14 mi) north of Hodonín, 47 km (29 mi) south-east of Brno, and 233 km (145 mi) south-east of Prague.

== Demographics ==
Historical population
Year	Pop.	±%
1869	329	—
1880	324	−1.5%
1890	336	+3.7%
1900	367	+9.2%
1910	361	−1.6%
1921	339	−6.1%
1930	354	+4.4%
1950	282	−20.3%
1961	309	+9.6%
1970	287	−7.1%
1980	245	−14.6%
1991	211	−13.9%
2001	210	−0.5%
2011	170	−19.0%
2021	134	−21.2%
Source: Censuses
