= Žádovice =

- Municipality
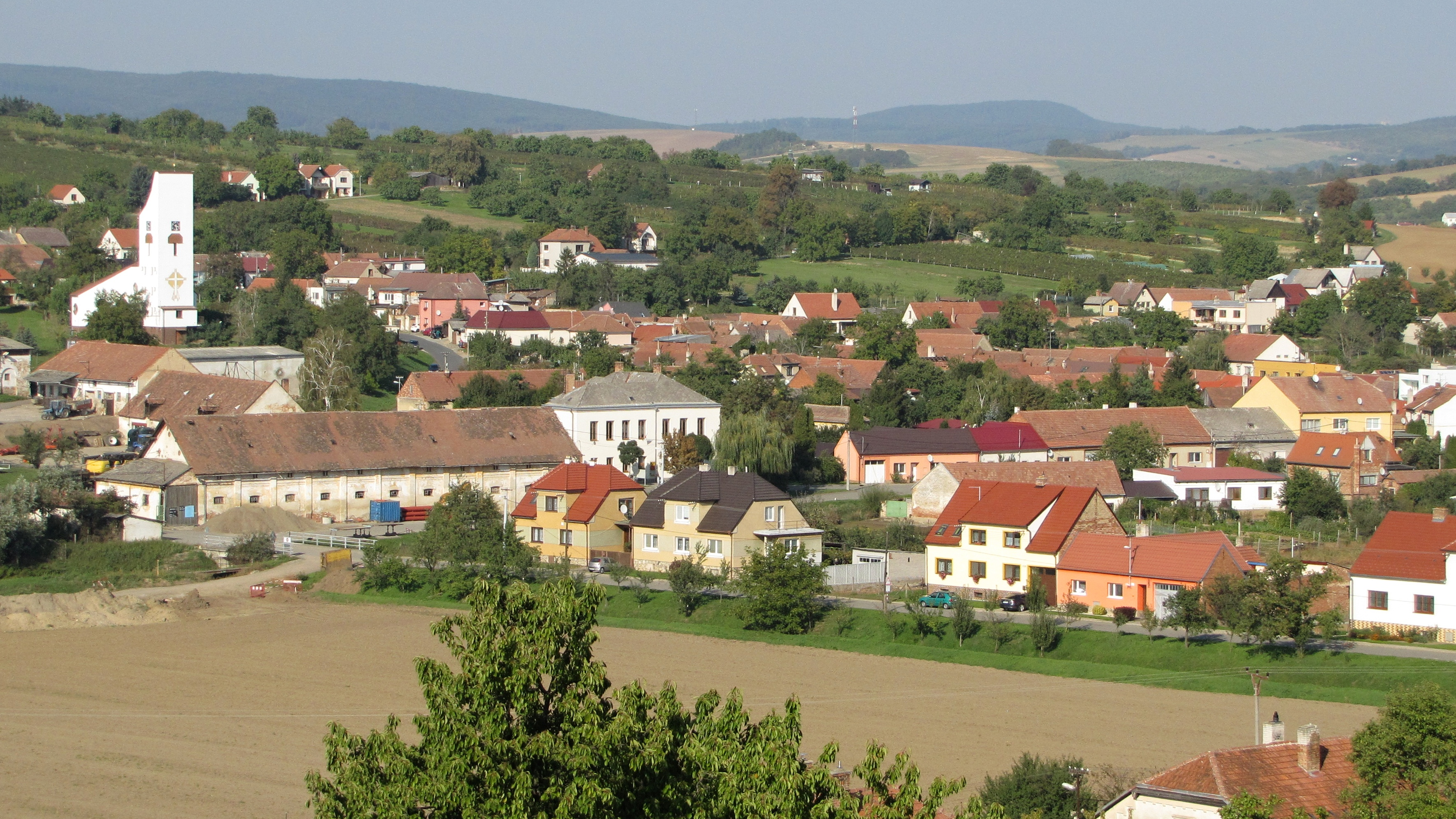
- General view

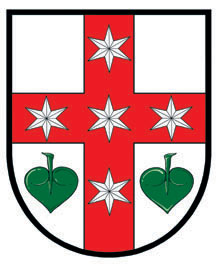
- Flag Coat of arms

- Location in the Czech Republic
- Coordinates: 49°0′48″N 17°11′49″E
- Country: Czech Republic
- Region: South Moravian
- District: Hodonín
- First mentioned: 1131

Area
  - Total: 5.57 km^{2} (2.15 sq mi)
- Elevation: 212 m (696 ft)

Population (2026-01-01)
  - Total: 718
  - Density: 129/km^{2} (334/sq mi)
- Time zone: UTC+1 (CET)
  - Summer (DST): UTC+2 (CEST)
- Postal code: 696 49
- Website: www.obeczadovice.cz

Žádovice (German: Schadowitz) is a municipality and village in Hodonín District in the South Moravian Region of the Czech Republic. It has about 700 inhabitants.

Žádovice lies approximately 19 kilometres (12 mi) north of Hodonín, 48 km (30 mi) south-east of Brno, and 234 km (145 mi) south-east of Prague.

== Demographics ==
Historical population
Year	Pop.	±%
1869	666	—
1880	821	+23.3%
1890	820	−0.1%
1900	846	+3.2%
1910	990	+17.0%
1921	994	+0.4%
1930	944	−5.0%
1950	824	−12.7%
1961	999	+21.2%
1970	888	−11.1%
1980	863	−2.8%
1991	818	−5.2%
2001	773	−5.5%
2011	742	−4.0%
2021	702	−5.4%
Source: Censuses
