= Čeložnice =

- Municipality
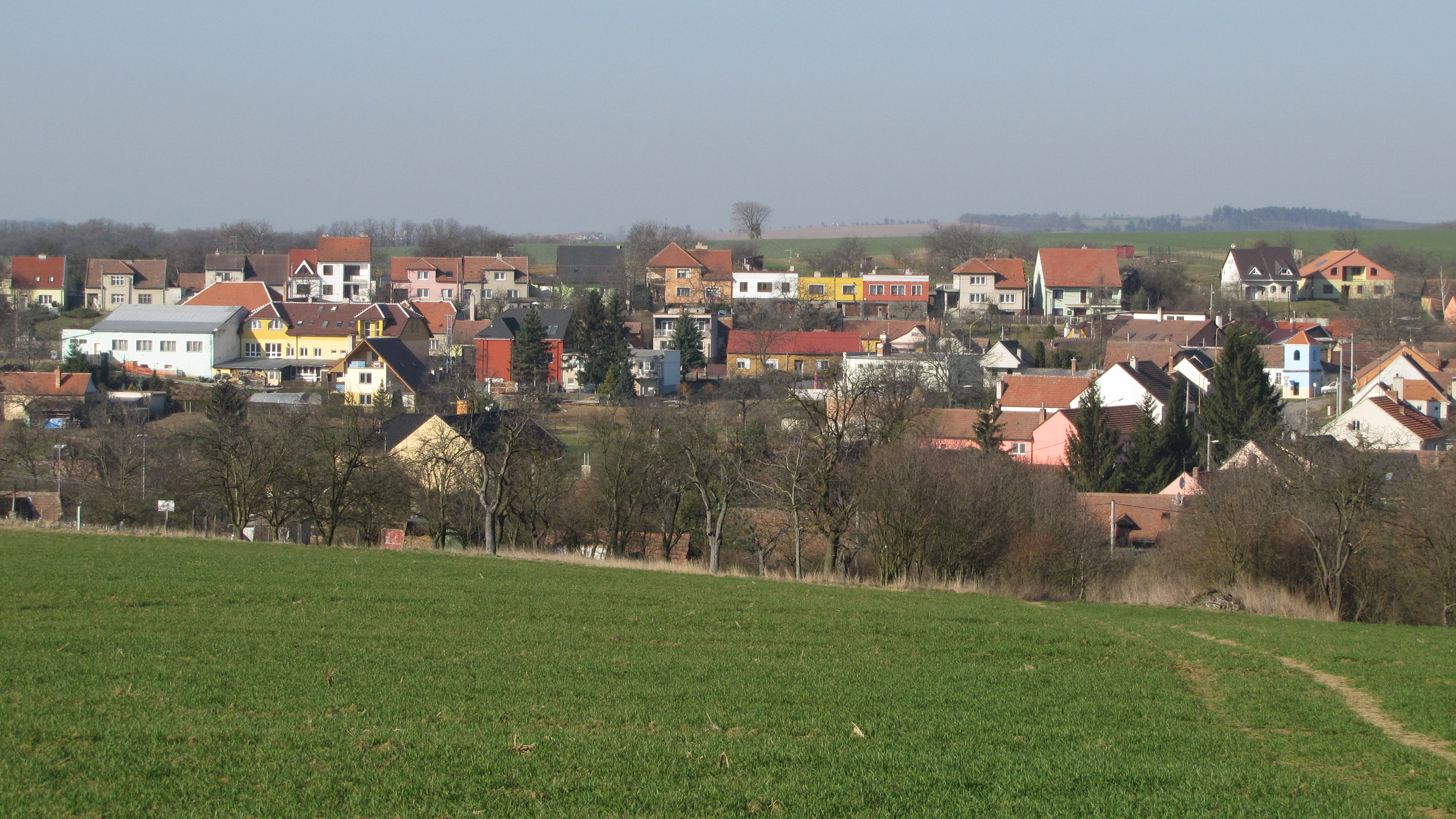
- View from the east

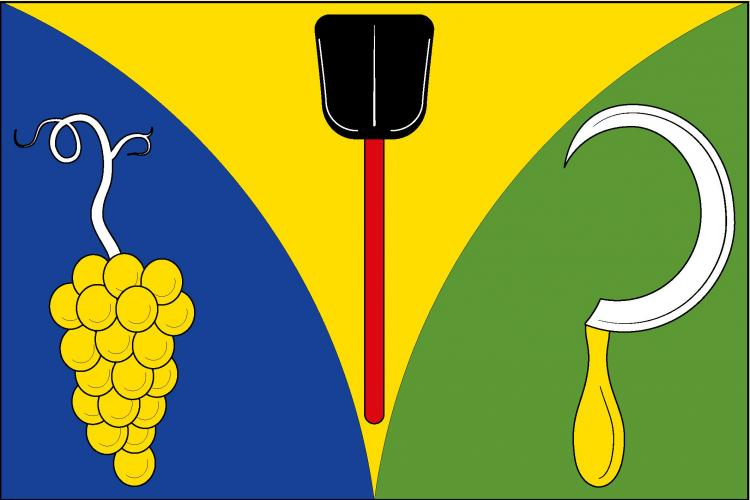
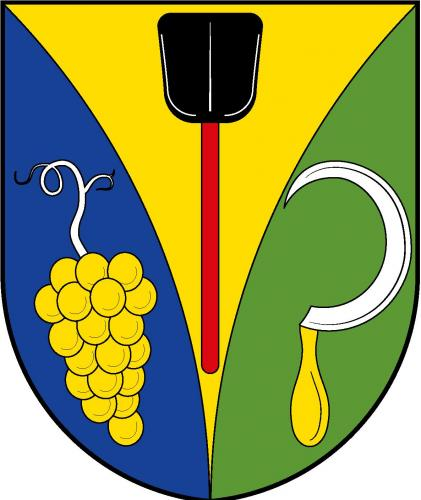
- Flag Coat of arms

- Location in the Czech Republic
- Coordinates: 49°3′7″N 17°9′17″E
- Country: Czech Republic
- Region: South Moravian
- District: Hodonín
- First mentioned: 1131

Area
  - Total: 6.32 km^{2} (2.44 sq mi)
- Elevation: 280 m (920 ft)

Population (2026-01-01)
  - Total: 413
  - Density: 65.3/km^{2} (169/sq mi)
- Time zone: UTC+1 (CET)
  - Summer (DST): UTC+2 (CEST)
- Postal code: 696 51
- Website: www.celoznice.cz

Čeložnice (German: Czelloschnitz) is a municipality and village in Hodonín District in the South Moravian Region of the Czech Republic. It has about 400 inhabitants.

Čeložnice lies approximately 23 kilometres (14 mi) north of Hodonín, 43 km (27 mi) south-east of Brno, and 229 km (142 mi) south-east of Prague.

== Demographics ==
Historical population
Year	Pop.	±%
1869	379	—
1880	424	+11.9%
1890	427	+0.7%
1900	510	+19.4%
1910	554	+8.6%
1921	561	+1.3%
1930	519	−7.5%
1950	476	−8.3%
1961	562	+18.1%
1970	511	−9.1%
1980	466	−8.8%
1991	392	−15.9%
2001	379	−3.3%
2011	414	+9.2%
2021	409	−1.2%
Source: Censuses
