= Sobůlky =

- Municipality
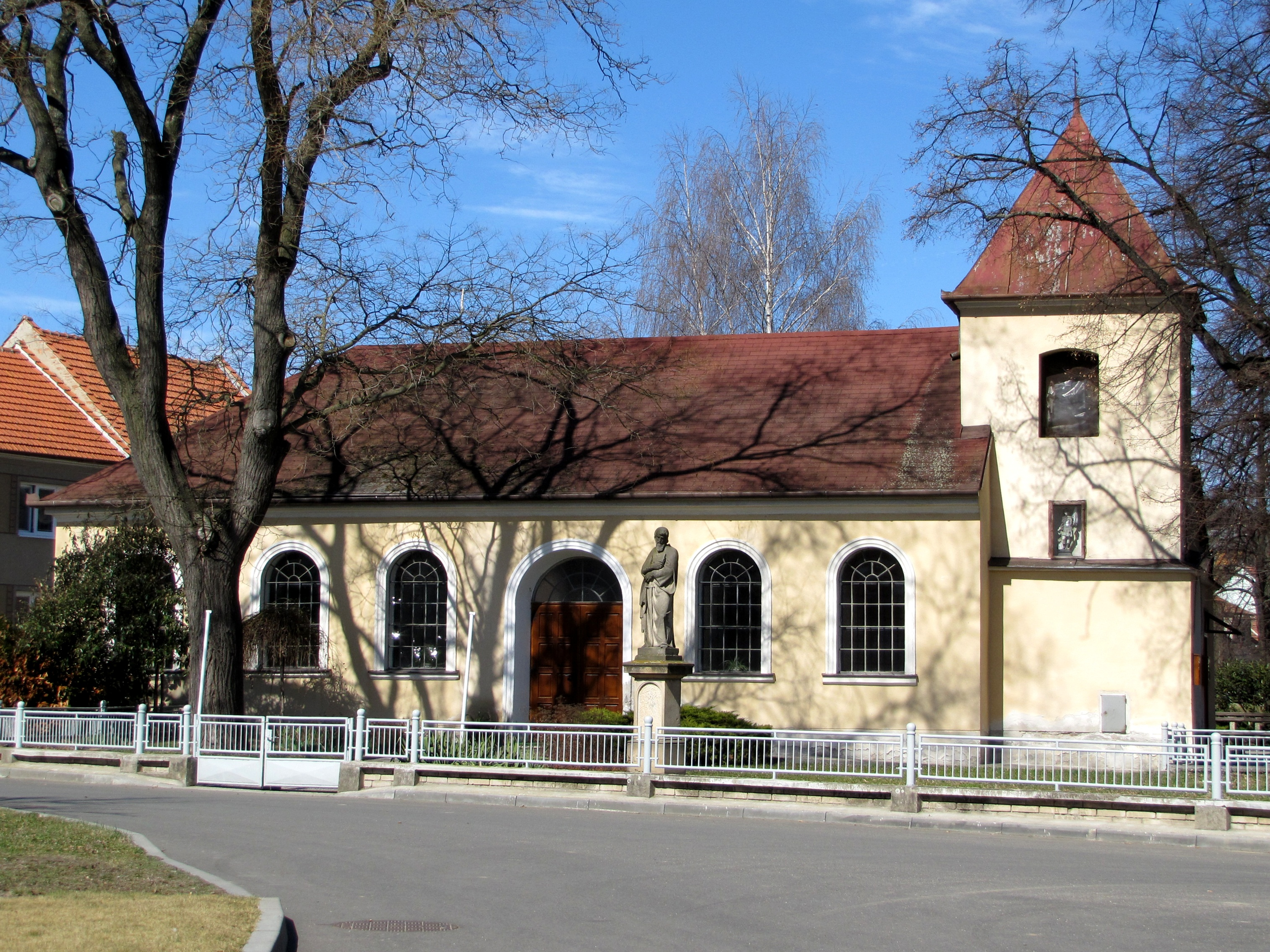
- Chapel of the Immaculate Heart of Mary

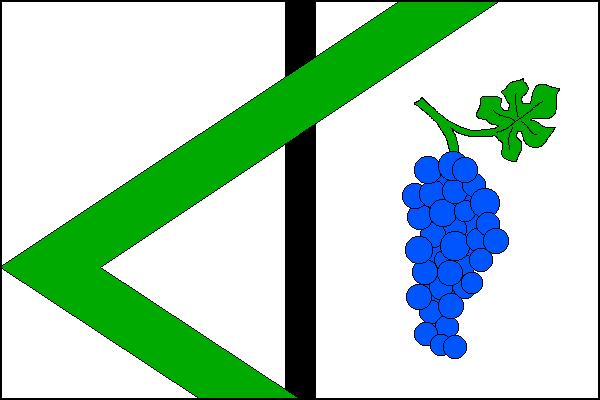
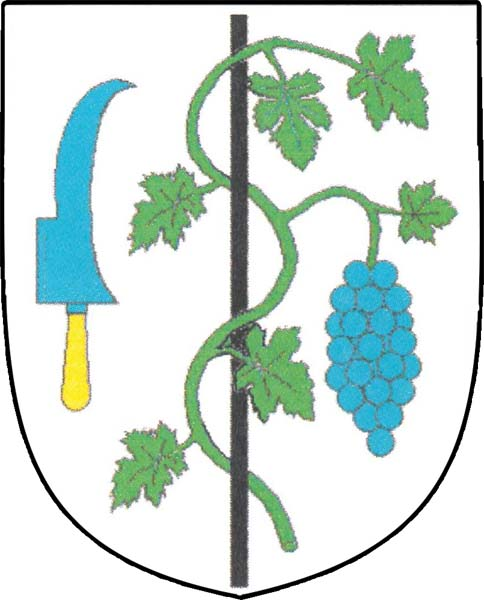
- Flag Coat of arms

- Location in the Czech Republic
- Coordinates: 49°1′11″N 17°4′44″E
- Country: Czech Republic
- Region: South Moravian
- District: Hodonín
- First mentioned: 1131

Area
  - Total: 7.01 km^{2} (2.71 sq mi)
- Elevation: 244 m (801 ft)

Population (2026-01-01)
  - Total: 844
  - Density: 120/km^{2} (312/sq mi)
- Time zone: UTC+1 (CET)
  - Summer (DST): UTC+2 (CEST)
- Postal code: 696 40
- Website: www.sobulky.cz

Sobůlky is a municipality and village in Hodonín District in the South Moravian Region of the Czech Republic. It has about 800 inhabitants.

Sobůlky lies approximately 20 kilometres (12 mi) north of Hodonín, 40 km (25 mi) south-east of Brno, and 226 km (140 mi) south-east of Prague.

== Demographics ==
Historical population
Year	Pop.	±%
1869	688	—
1880	729	+6.0%
1890	760	+4.3%
1900	845	+11.2%
1910	936	+10.8%
1921	919	−1.8%
1930	966	+5.1%
1950	950	−1.7%
1961	1,072	+12.8%
1970	1,020	−4.9%
1980	970	−4.9%
1991	893	−7.9%
2001	898	+0.6%
2011	874	−2.7%
2021	788	−9.8%
Source: Censuses
