= Moravany (Hodonín District) =

- Municipality
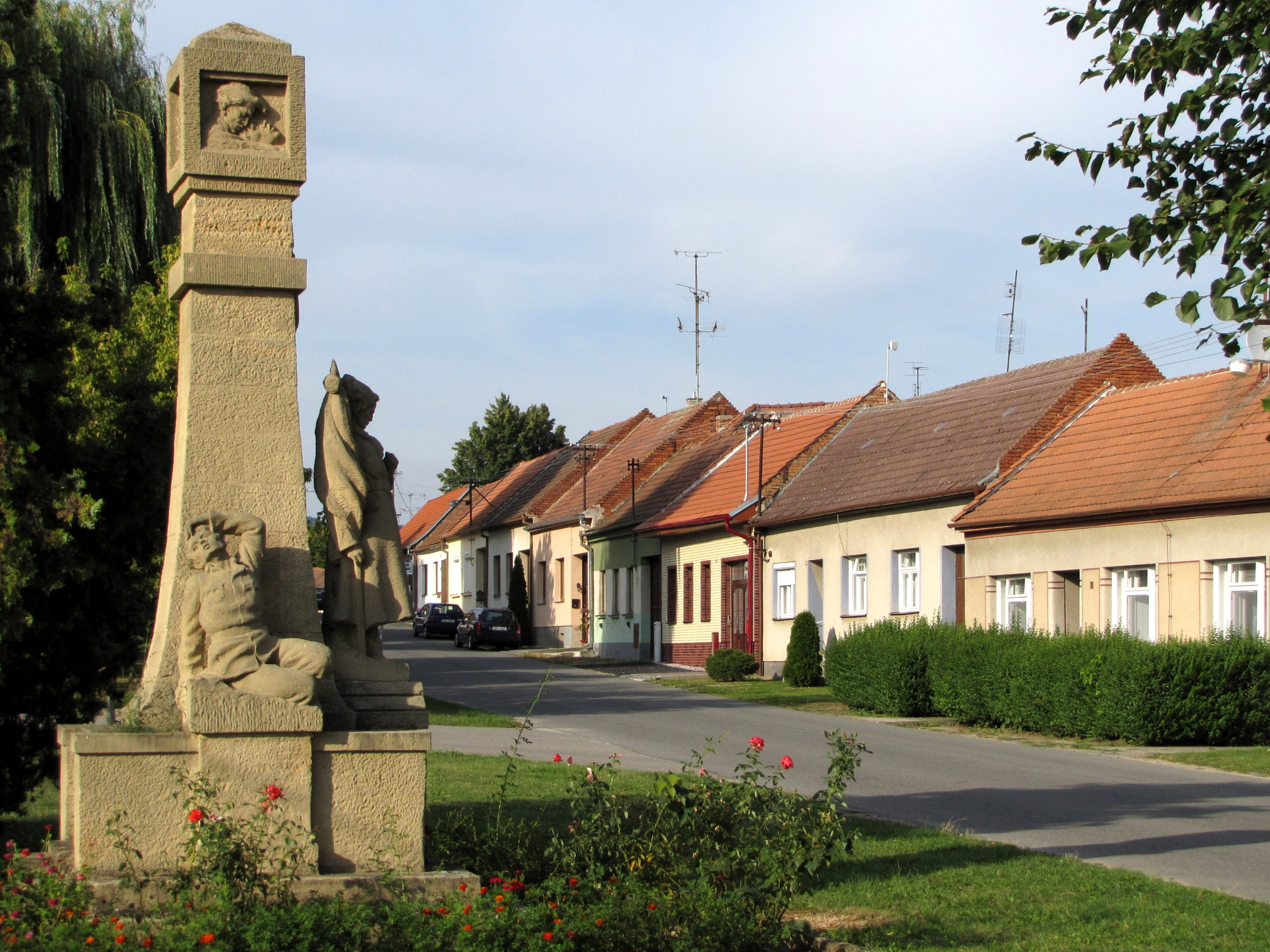
- Centre with Memorial of Victims of the World Wars

- Flag Coat of arms

- Location in the Czech Republic
- Coordinates: 49°2′24″N 17°10′8″E
- Country: Czech Republic
- Region: South Moravian
- District: Hodonín
- First mentioned: 1324

Area
  - Total: 10.91 km^{2} (4.21 sq mi)
- Elevation: 248 m (814 ft)

Population (2026-01-01)
  - Total: 700
  - Density: 64/km^{2} (170/sq mi)
- Time zone: UTC+1 (CET)
  - Summer (DST): UTC+2 (CEST)
- Postal code: 696 50
- Website: www.obecmoravany.cz

Moravany is a municipality and village in Hodonín District in the South Moravian Region of the Czech Republic. It has about 700 inhabitants.

Moravany lies approximately 22 kilometres (14 mi) north of Hodonín, 44 km (27 mi) south-east of Brno, and 230 km (140 mi) south-east of Prague.

== Demographics ==
Historical population
Year	Pop.	±%
1869	800	—
1880	907	+13.4%
1890	916	+1.0%
1900	935	+2.1%
1910	1,040	+11.2%
1921	1,040	+0.0%
1930	961	−7.6%
1950	924	−3.9%
1961	959	+3.8%
1970	939	−2.1%
1980	821	−12.6%
1991	745	−9.3%
2001	746	+0.1%
2011	737	−1.2%
2021	707	−4.1%
Source: Censuses
