= Skoronice =

- Municipality
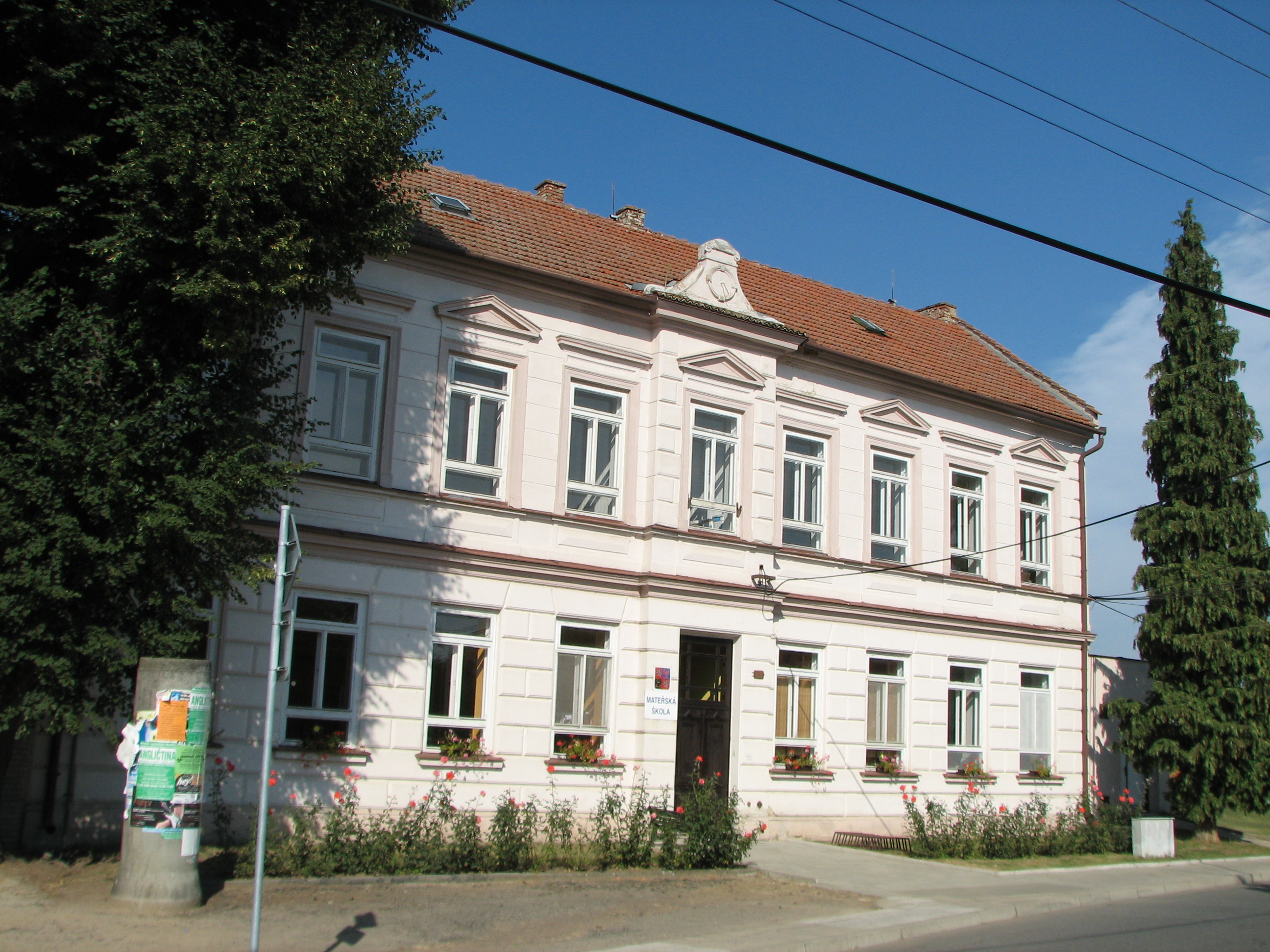
- Kindergarten

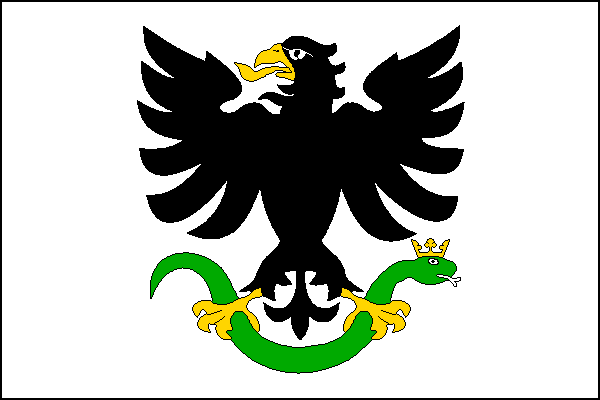
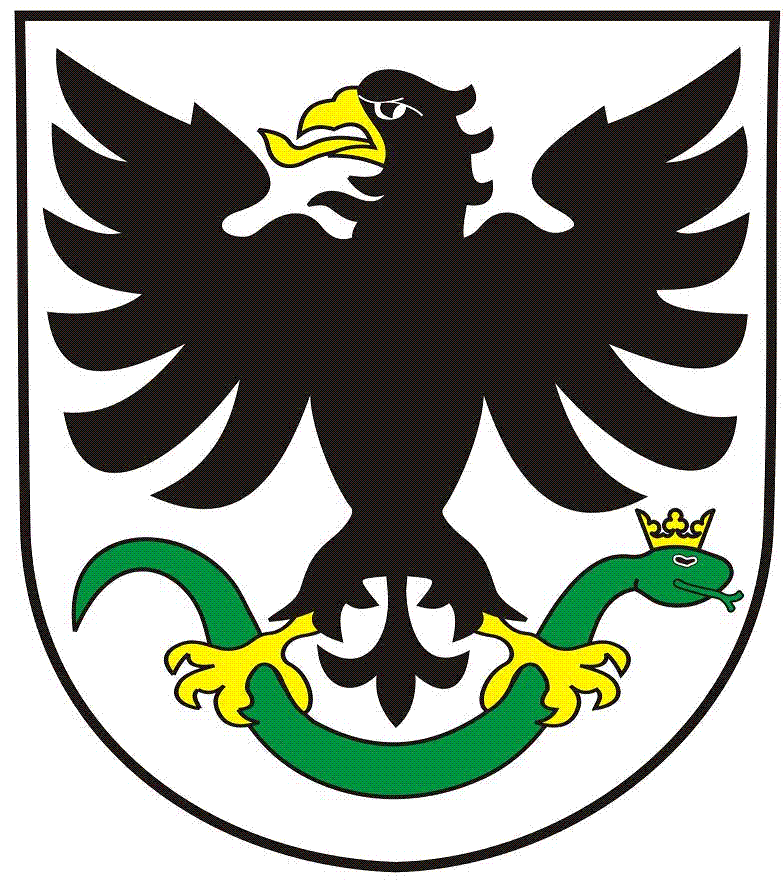
- Flag Coat of arms

- Location in the Czech Republic
- Coordinates: 48°58′43″N 17°9′12″E
- Country: Czech Republic
- Region: South Moravian
- District: Hodonín
- First mentioned: 1322

Area
  - Total: 5.37 km^{2} (2.07 sq mi)
- Elevation: 192 m (630 ft)

Population (2026-01-01)
  - Total: 493
  - Density: 91.8/km^{2} (238/sq mi)
- Time zone: UTC+1 (CET)
  - Summer (DST): UTC+2 (CEST)
- Postal code: 696 41
- Website: www.skoronice.cz

Skoronice is a municipality and village in Hodonín District in the South Moravian Region of the Czech Republic. It has about 500 inhabitants.

Skoronice lies approximately 16 kilometres (10 mi) north of Hodonín, 46 km (29 mi) south-east of Brno, and 233 km (145 mi) south-east of Prague.

== Demographics ==
Historical population
Year	Pop.	±%
1869	418	—
1880	418	+0.0%
1890	411	−1.7%
1900	438	+6.6%
1910	489	+11.6%
1921	481	−1.6%
1930	441	−8.3%
1950	501	+13.6%
1961	513	+2.4%
1970	505	−1.6%
1980	495	−2.0%
1991	502	+1.4%
2001	539	+7.4%
2011	535	−0.7%
2021	483	−9.7%
Source: Censuses
