= Domanín (Hodonín District) =

- Municipality
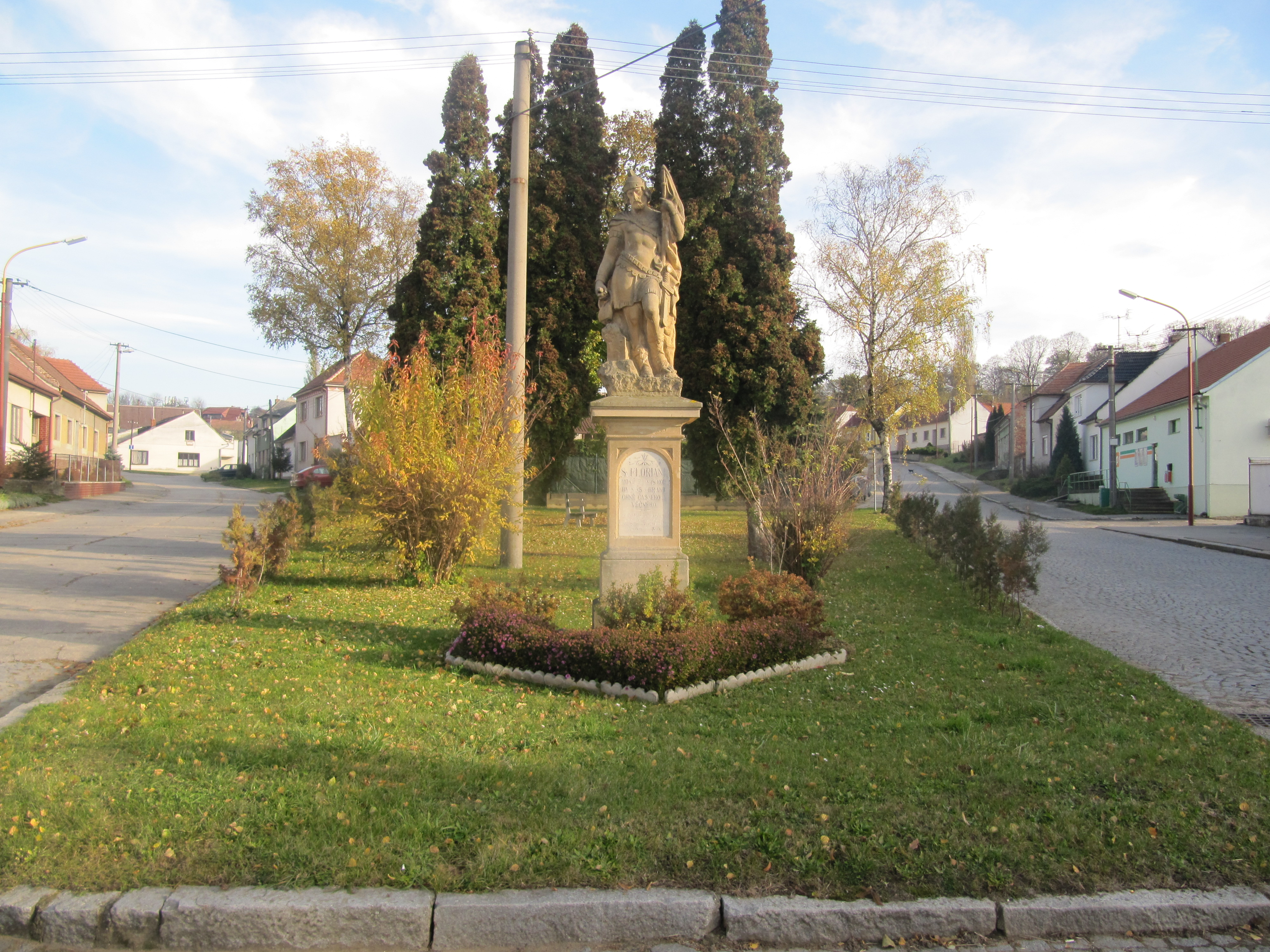
- Statue of Saint Florian

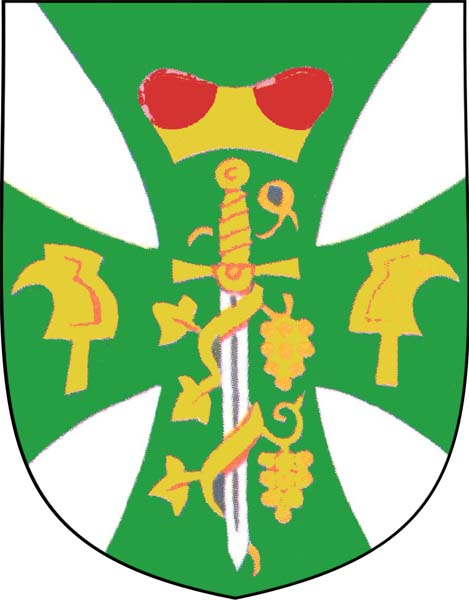
- Flag Coat of arms

- Location in the Czech Republic
- Coordinates: 49°0′6″N 17°17′5″E
- Country: Czech Republic
- Region: South Moravian
- District: Hodonín
- First mentioned: 1228

Area
  - Total: 7.01 km^{2} (2.71 sq mi)
- Elevation: 238 m (781 ft)

Population (2026-01-01)
  - Total: 1,017
  - Density: 145/km^{2} (376/sq mi)
- Time zone: UTC+1 (CET)
  - Summer (DST): UTC+2 (CEST)
- Postal code: 696 83
- Website: www.domanin.eu

Domanín is a municipality and village in Hodonín District in the South Moravian Region of the Czech Republic. It has about 1,000 inhabitants.

Domanín lies approximately 21 kilometres (13 mi) north-east of Hodonín, 54 km (34 mi) south-east of Brno, and 240 km (150 mi) south-east of Prague.

== Demographics ==
Historical population
Year	Pop.	±%
1869	1,088	—
1880	1,106	+1.7%
1890	1,174	+6.1%
1900	1,218	+3.7%
1910	1,213	−0.4%
1921	1,291	+6.4%
1930	1,228	−4.9%
1950	1,216	−1.0%
1961	1,324	+8.9%
1970	1,261	−4.8%
1980	1,126	−10.7%
1991	1,085	−3.6%
2001	1,043	−3.9%
2011	1,003	−3.8%
2021	988	−1.5%
Source: Censuses
