= Kostelec (Hodonín District) =

- Municipality
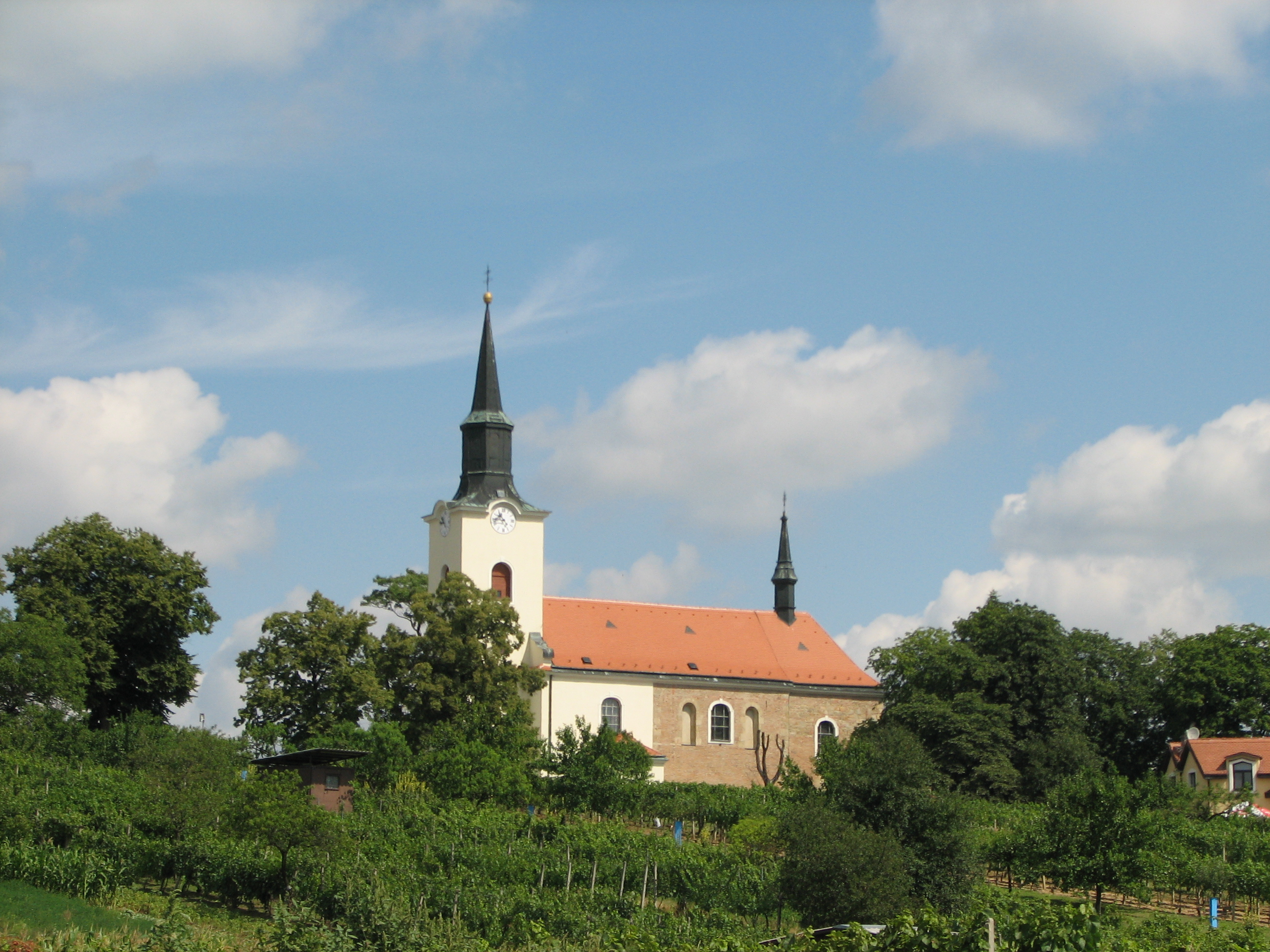
- Church of Saint Wenceslaus

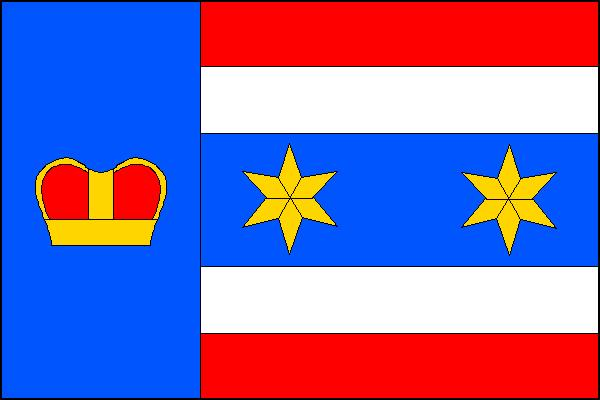
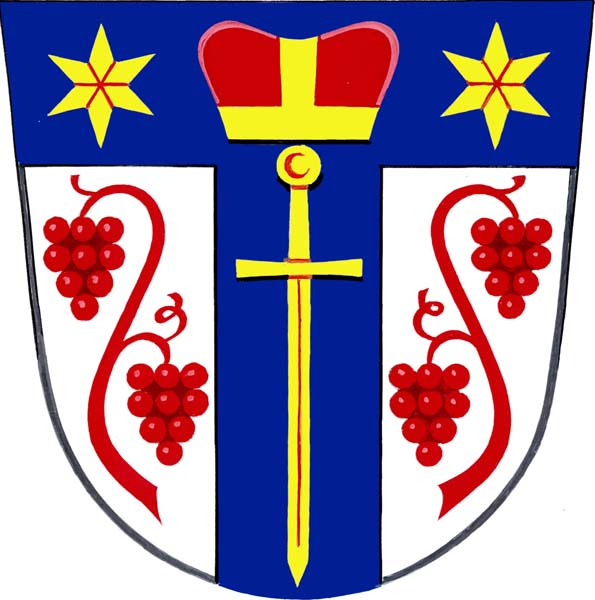
- Flag Coat of arms

- Location in the Czech Republic
- Coordinates: 49°1′37″N 17°9′12″E
- Country: Czech Republic
- Region: South Moravian
- District: Hodonín
- First mentioned: 1141

Area
  - Total: 5.07 km^{2} (1.96 sq mi)
- Elevation: 220 m (720 ft)

Population (2026-01-01)
  - Total: 863
  - Density: 170/km^{2} (441/sq mi)
- Time zone: UTC+1 (CET)
  - Summer (DST): UTC+2 (CEST)
- Postal code: 696 51
- Website: www.obec-kostelec.cz

Kostelec is a municipality and village in Hodonín District in the South Moravian Region of the Czech Republic. It has about 900 inhabitants.

Kostelec lies approximately 20 kilometres (12 mi) north of Hodonín, 44 km (27 mi) south-east of Brno, and 230 km (140 mi) south-east of Prague.

== Demographics ==
Historical population
Year	Pop.	±%
1869	711	—
1880	769	+8.2%
1890	795	+3.4%
1900	911	+14.6%
1910	982	+7.8%
1921	964	−1.8%
1930	907	−5.9%
1950	829	−8.6%
1961	861	+3.9%
1970	808	−6.2%
1980	754	−6.7%
1991	762	+1.1%
2001	750	−1.6%
2011	847	+12.9%
2021	861	+1.7%
Source: Censuses
