= Radějov =

- Municipality
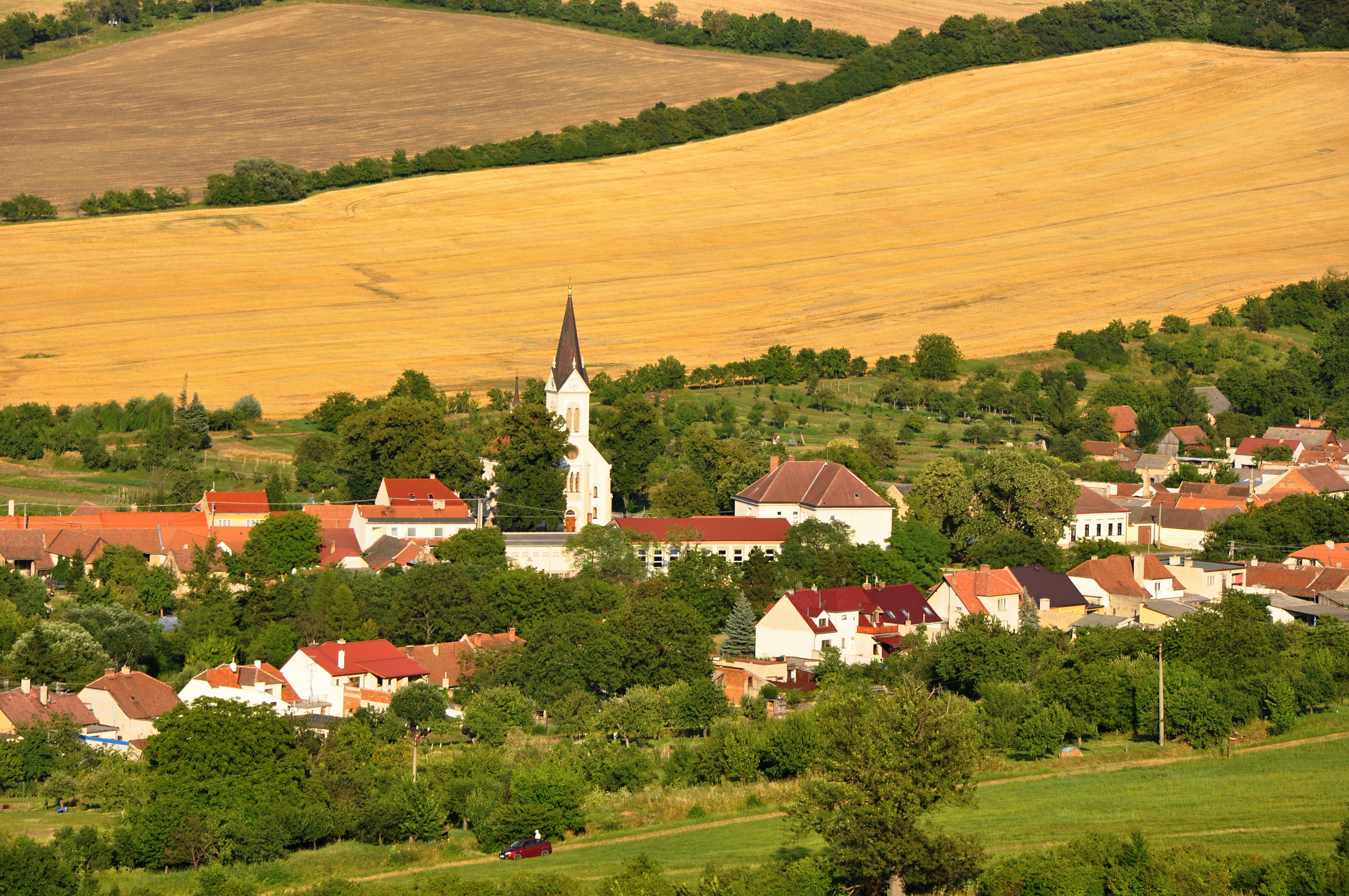
- General view

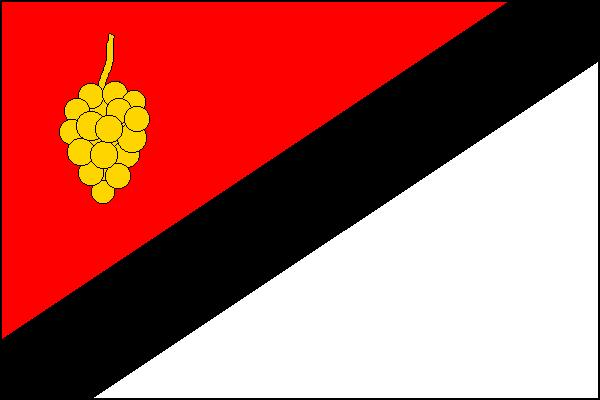
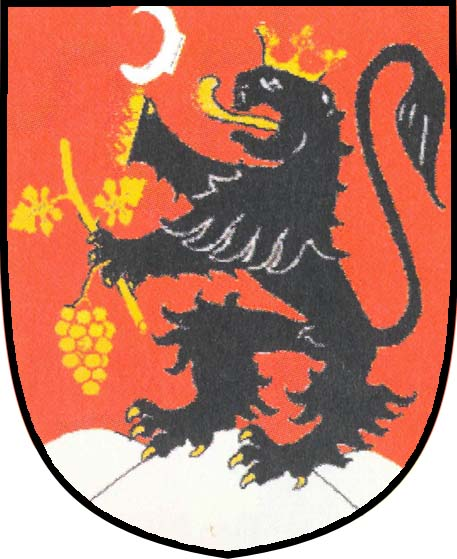
- Flag Coat of arms

- Location in the Czech Republic
- Coordinates: 48°51′34″N 17°20′41″E
- Country: Czech Republic
- Region: South Moravian
- District: Hodonín
- First mentioned: 1412

Area
  - Total: 24.10 km^{2} (9.31 sq mi)
- Elevation: 236 m (774 ft)

Population (2026-01-01)
  - Total: 845
  - Density: 35.1/km^{2} (90.8/sq mi)
- Time zone: UTC+1 (CET)
  - Summer (DST): UTC+2 (CEST)
- Postal code: 696 67
- Website: www.radejov.cz

Radějov is a municipality and village in Hodonín District in the South Moravian Region of the Czech Republic. It has about 800 inhabitants.

Radějov lies approximately 16 kilometres (10 mi) east of Hodonín, 66 km (41 mi) south-east of Brno, and 252 km (157 mi) south-east of Prague.

== Demographics ==
Historical population
Year	Pop.	±%
1869	1,069	—
1880	1,129	+5.6%
1890	1,002	−11.2%
1900	1,032	+3.0%
1910	1,018	−1.4%
1921	967	−5.0%
1930	999	+3.3%
1950	917	−8.2%
1961	1,068	+16.5%
1970	1,026	−3.9%
1980	932	−9.2%
1991	832	−10.7%
2001	857	+3.0%
2011	810	−5.5%
2021	826	+2.0%
Source: Censuses
