= Hodonín District =

Hodonín District Okres Hodonín
- District
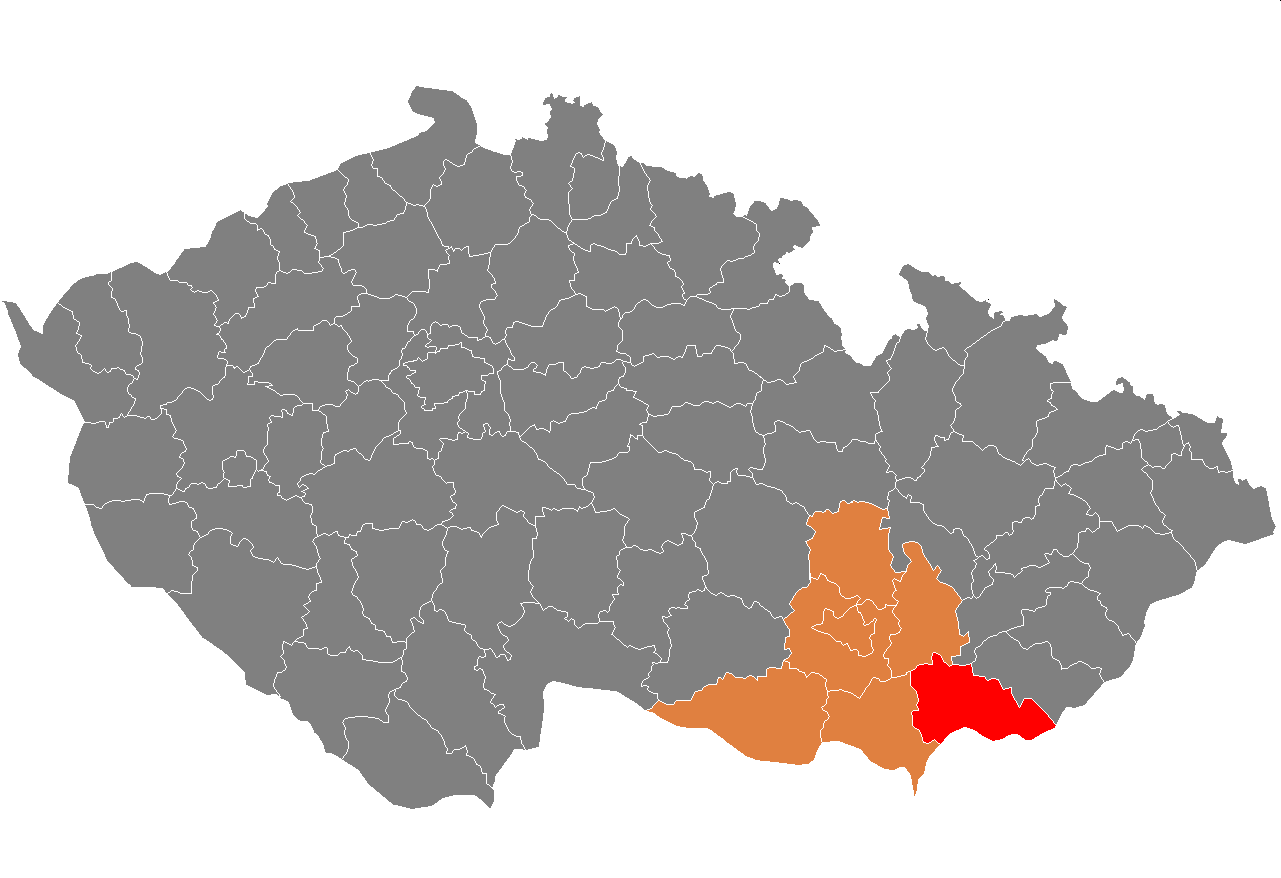
- Location in the South Moravian Region within the Czech Republic
- Coordinates: 48°57′N 17°11′E
- Country: Czech Republic
- Region: South Moravian
- Capital: Hodonín

Area
  - Total: 1,099.00 km^{2} (424.33 sq mi)

Population (2026)
  - Total: 150,352
  - Density: 136.808/km^{2} (354.331/sq mi)
- Time zone: UTC+1 (CET)
  - Summer (DST): UTC+2 (CEST)
- Municipalities: 82
- * Towns: 8
- * Market towns: 0

Hodonín District (Czech: okres Hodonín) is a district in the South Moravian Region of the Czech Republic. Its capital is the town of Hodonín.

== Administrative division ==
Hodonín District is divided into three administrative districts of municipalities with extended competence: Hodonín, Kyjov and Veselí nad Moravou.

=== List of municipalities ===
Towns are marked in bold:

Archlebov - Blatnice pod Svatým Antonínkem - Blatnička - Bukovany - Bzenec - Čejč - Čejkovice - Čeložnice - Dambořice - Dolní Bojanovice - Domanín - Dražůvky - Dubňany - Hodonín - Hovorany - Hroznová Lhota - Hrubá Vrbka - Hýsly - Javorník - Ježov - Josefov - Karlín - Kelčany - Kněždub - Kostelec - Kozojídky - Kuželov - Kyjov - Labuty - Lipov - Louka - Lovčice - Lužice - Malá Vrbka - Mikulčice - Milotice - Mouchnice - Moravany - Moravský Písek - Mutěnice - Násedlovice - Nechvalín - Nenkovice - Nová Lhota - Nový Poddvorov - Ostrovánky - Petrov - Prušánky - Radějov - Ratíškovice - Rohatec - Šardice - Skalka - Skoronice - Sobůlky - Starý Poddvorov - Stavěšice - Strážnice - Strážovice - Sudoměřice - Suchov - Svatobořice-Mistřín - Syrovín - Tasov - Těmice - Terezín - Tvarožná Lhota - Uhřice - Vacenovice - Velká nad Veličkou - Veselí nad Moravou - Věteřov - Vlkoš - Vnorovy - Vracov - Vřesovice - Žádovice - Žarošice - Ždánice - Želetice - Žeravice - Žeraviny

== Geography ==
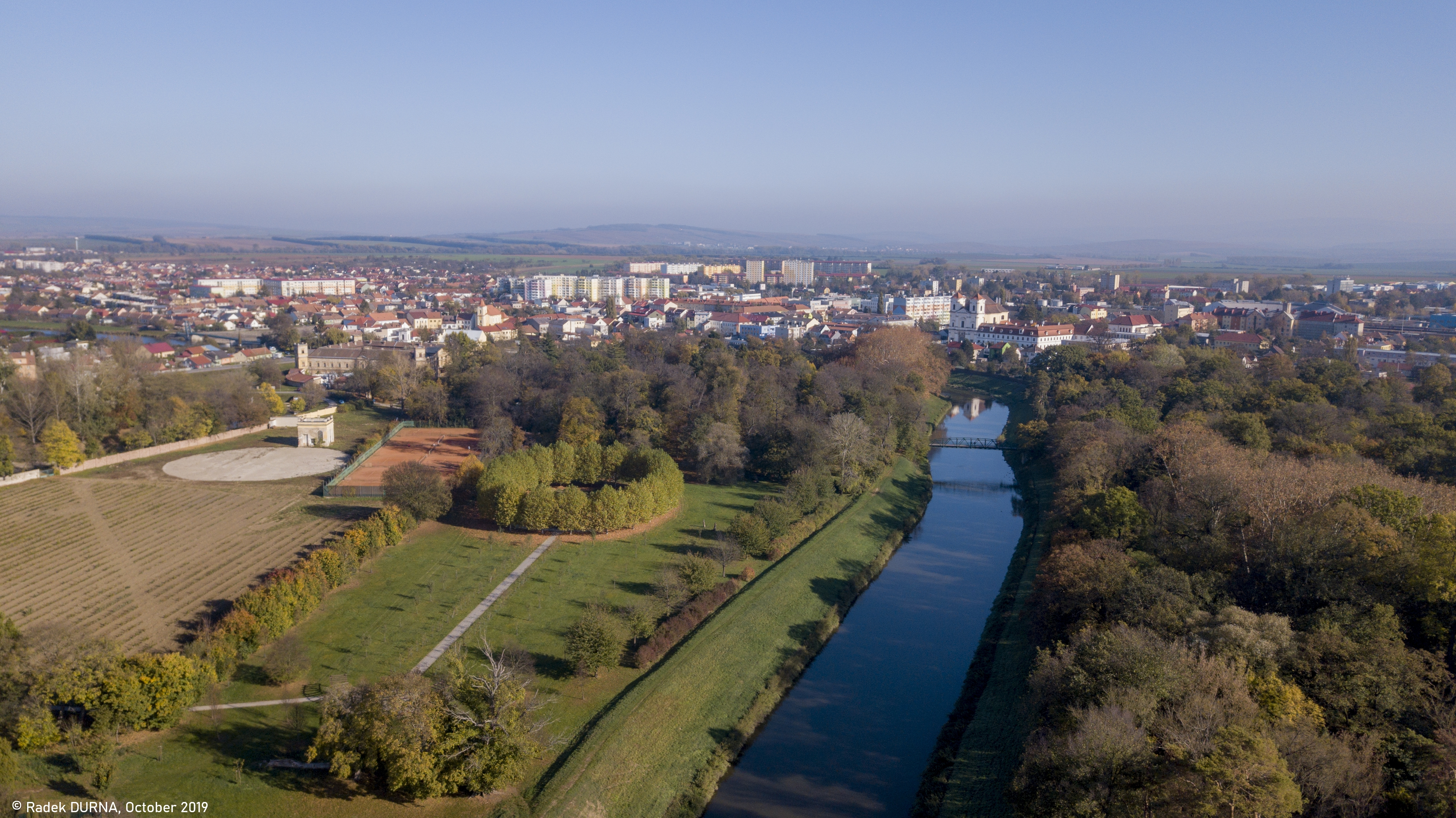
Veselí nad Moravou and surrounding landscape

Hodonín District borders Slovakia in the south. The terrain is very varied. A large part consists of the lowland, which belongs to the warmest and driest areas in the country. The north and southeast of the territory is hilly. The territory extends into seven geomorphological mesoregions: Lower Morava Valley (southwest and centre), Kyjov Hills (a strip from west to east), Ždánice Forest (northwest), Chřiby (small part in the northeast), Vizovice Highlands (east), White Carpathians (southeast), and Chvojnice Hills (a negligible area along the Czech–Slovak border). The highest point of the district is a contour line on the slopes of the mountain Durda in Nová Lhota with an elevation of 838 m (2,749 ft). The lowest point of the district is the river bed of the Morava in Mikulčice at 158 m (518 ft).

From the total district area of 1,099.0 km^{2} (424.3 sq mi), agricultural land occupies 684.7 km^{2} (264.4 sq mi), forests occupy 278.7 km^{2} (107.6 sq mi), and water area occupies 22.2 km^{2} (8.6 sq mi). Forests cover 25.4% of the district's area.

The main river of the district is the Morava, which flows across the district from east to southwest and partly forms the Czech–Slovak border. Its most important tributaries in the district are the Kyjovka and Velička. The Myjava River originates here, but immediately leaves the territory of the country.

Overall, the territory of the district is poor in bodies of water, but there is a numerous system of fishponds on the Kyjovka River. The largest of the ponds is Jarohněvický rybník with an area of 88.9 ha (220 acres).

Bílé Karpaty is a protected landscape area that extends into the district in the southeast.

== Demographics ==
Historical population

Year	Pop.	±%
1869	94,276	—
1880	103,975	+10.3%
1890	110,046	+5.8%
1900	118,756	+7.9%
1910	128,593	+8.3%

Year	Pop.	±%
1921	131,166	+2.0%
1930	133,051	+1.4%
1950	129,448	−2.7%
1961	149,907	+15.8%
1970	155,063	+3.4%

Year	Pop.	±%
1980	162,659	+4.9%
1991	161,474	−0.7%
2001	160,237	−0.8%
2011	153,225	−4.4%
2021	147,773	−3.6%

Source: Censuses

=== Most populous municipalities ===
Name	Population	Area (km^{2})
Hodonín	23,344	63
Veselí nad Moravou	10,574	35
Kyjov	10,537	30
Dubňany	6,179	23
Strážnice	5,282	31
Vracov	4,528	44
Bzenec	4,525	40
Ratíškovice	3,905	13
Mutěnice	3,735	32
Svatobořice-Mistřín	3,557	23

== Economy ==
The largest employers with headquarters in Hodonín District and at least 500 employees are:

Economic entity	Location	Number of employees	Main activity
Kyjov Hospital	Kyjov	1,500–1,999	Health care
Delimax	Hodonín	500–999	Food industry
TGM Hospital Hodonín	Hodonín	500–999	Health care
Jednota, spotřební družstvo v Hodoníně	Hodonín	500–999	Retail sale
Vetropack Moravia Glass	Kyjov	500–999	Manufacture of hollow glass
The Candy Plus Sweet Factory	Rohatec	500–999	Food industry

== Transport ==
There are no motorways passing through the district. The most important roads are the I/54 and I/55 roads.

== Sights ==
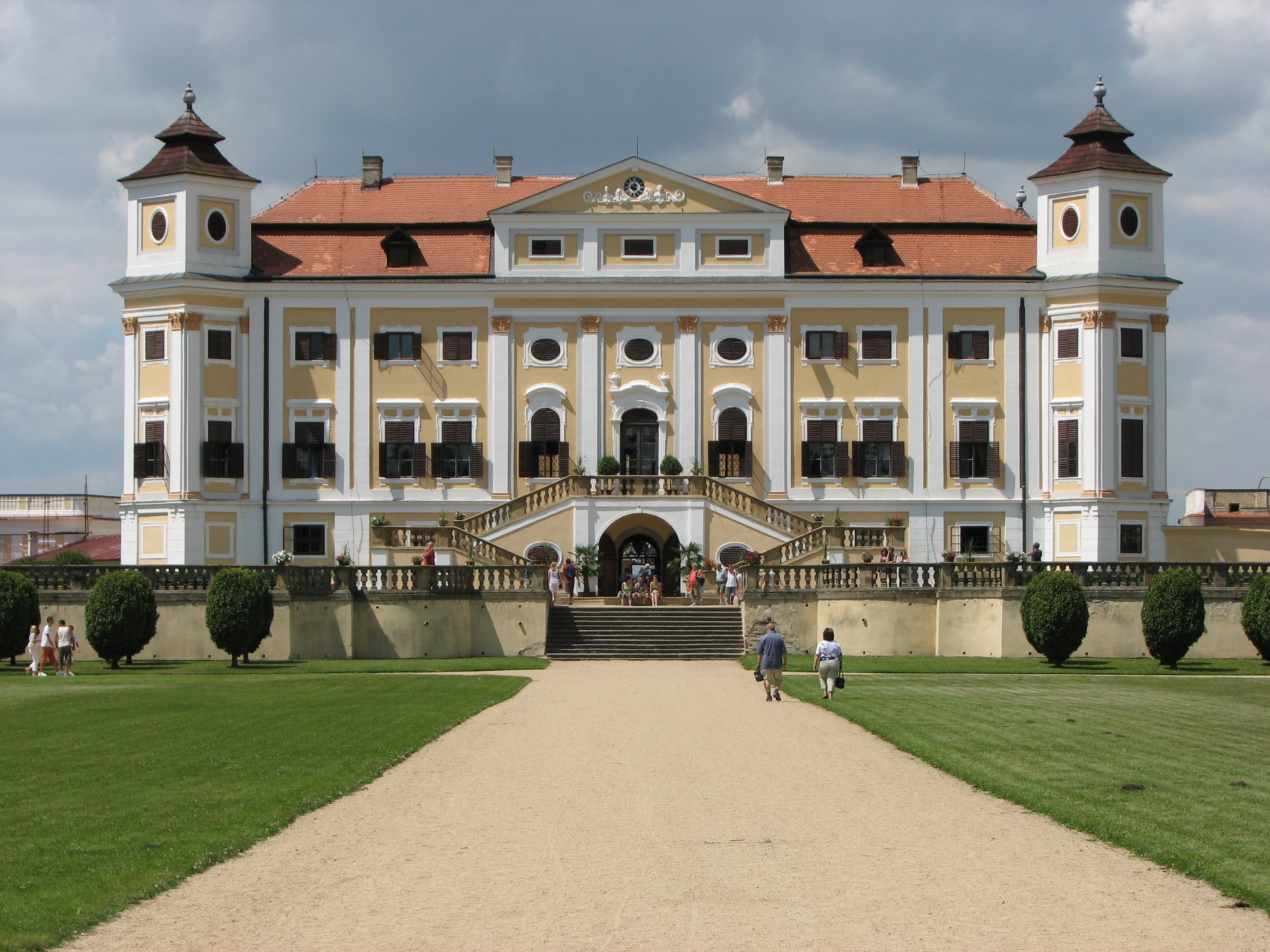
Milotice Castle

The most important monuments in the district, protected as national cultural monuments, are:

- Slavic gord of Mikulčice-Valy
- Milotice Castle
- Windmill in Kuželov
- Belfry in Louka
- Kyjov Town Hall

The best-preserved settlements, protected as monument reservations and monument zones, are:

- Blatnice pod Svatým Antonínkem-Stará Hora (monument reservation)
- Petrov-Plže (monument reservation)
- Kyjov
- Strážnice
- Veselí nad Moravou
- Vápenky
- Javorník-Kopánky

The most visited tourist destination is the Hodonín Zoo.
