= Nový Poddvorov =

- Municipality
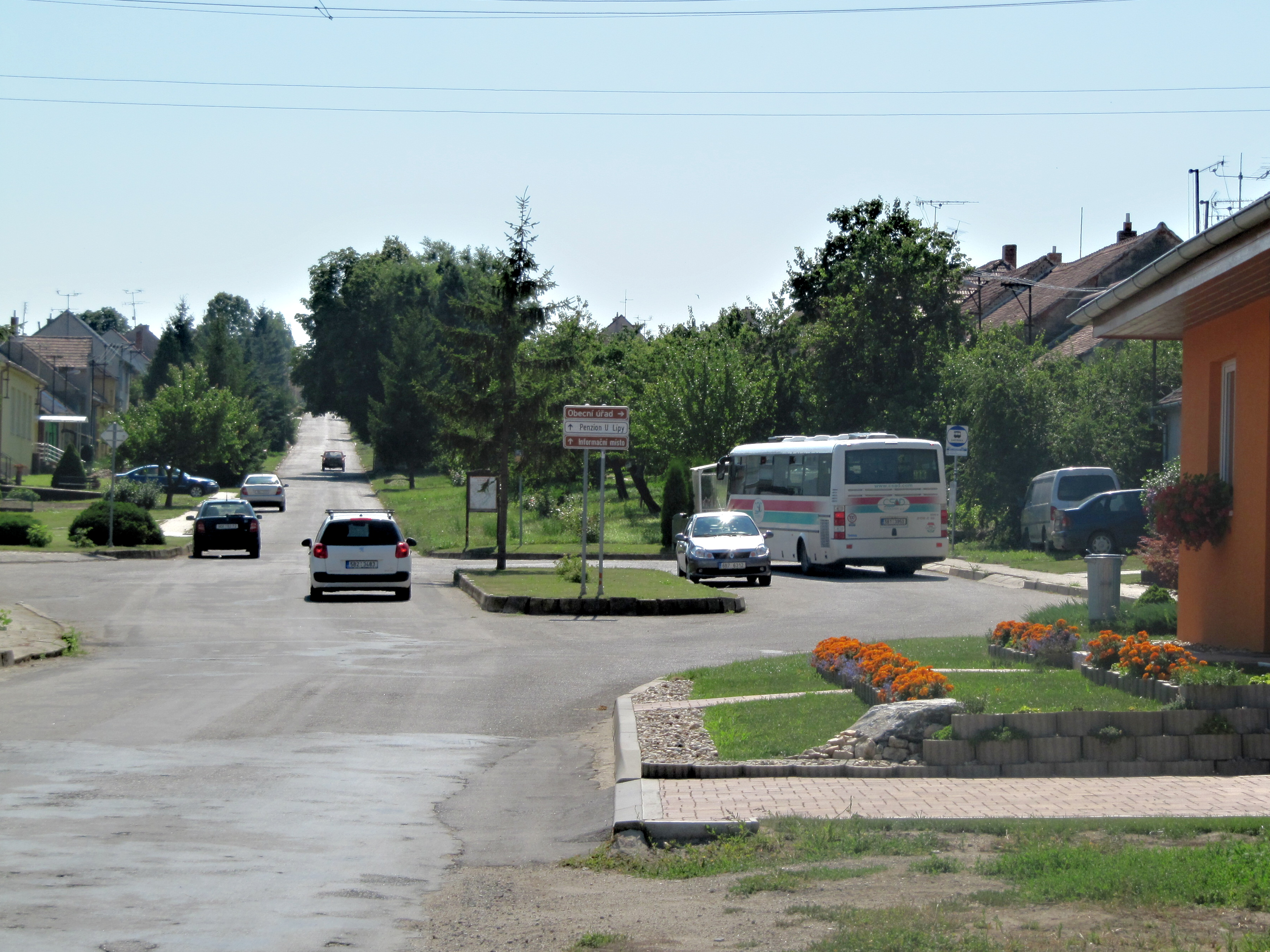
- Centre of Nový Poddvorov

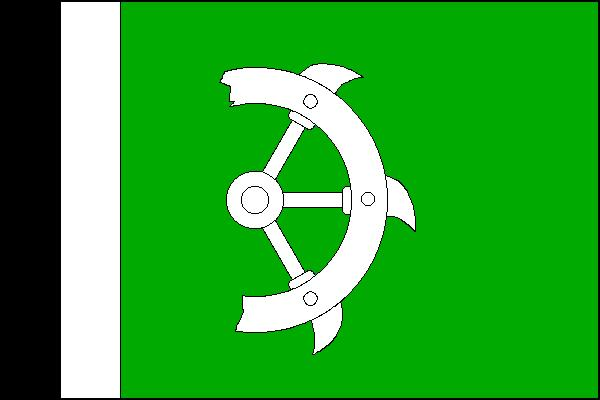
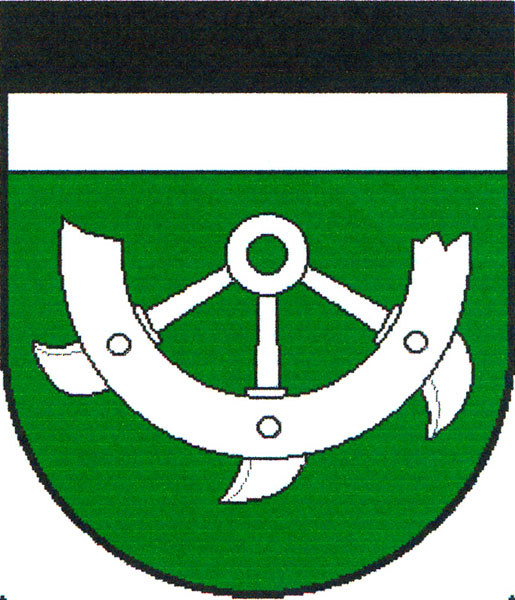
- Flag Coat of arms

- Location in the Czech Republic
- Coordinates: 48°52′6″N 16°57′40″E
- Country: Czech Republic
- Region: South Moravian
- District: Hodonín
- Founded: 1783

Area
  - Total: 2.97 km^{2} (1.15 sq mi)
- Elevation: 246 m (807 ft)

Population (2026-01-01)
  - Total: 234
  - Density: 78.8/km^{2} (204/sq mi)
- Time zone: UTC+1 (CET)
  - Summer (DST): UTC+2 (CEST)
- Postal code: 696 16
- Website: www.novypoddvorov.cz

Nový Poddvorov is a municipality and village in Hodonín District in the South Moravian Region of the Czech Republic. It has about 200 inhabitants.

Nový Poddvorov lies approximately 13 kilometres (8 mi) west of Hodonín, 46 km (29 mi) south-east of Brno, and 229 km (142 mi) south-east of Prague.

== Demographics ==
Historical population
Year	Pop.	±%
1869	165	—
1880	197	+19.4%
1890	182	−7.6%
1900	221	+21.4%
1910	252	+14.0%
1921	285	+13.1%
1930	295	+3.5%
1950	286	−3.1%
1961	299	+4.5%
1970	299	+0.0%
1980	255	−14.7%
1991	218	−14.5%
2001	181	−17.0%
2011	184	+1.7%
2021	228	+23.9%
Source: Censuses
