= Žeraviny =

- Municipality
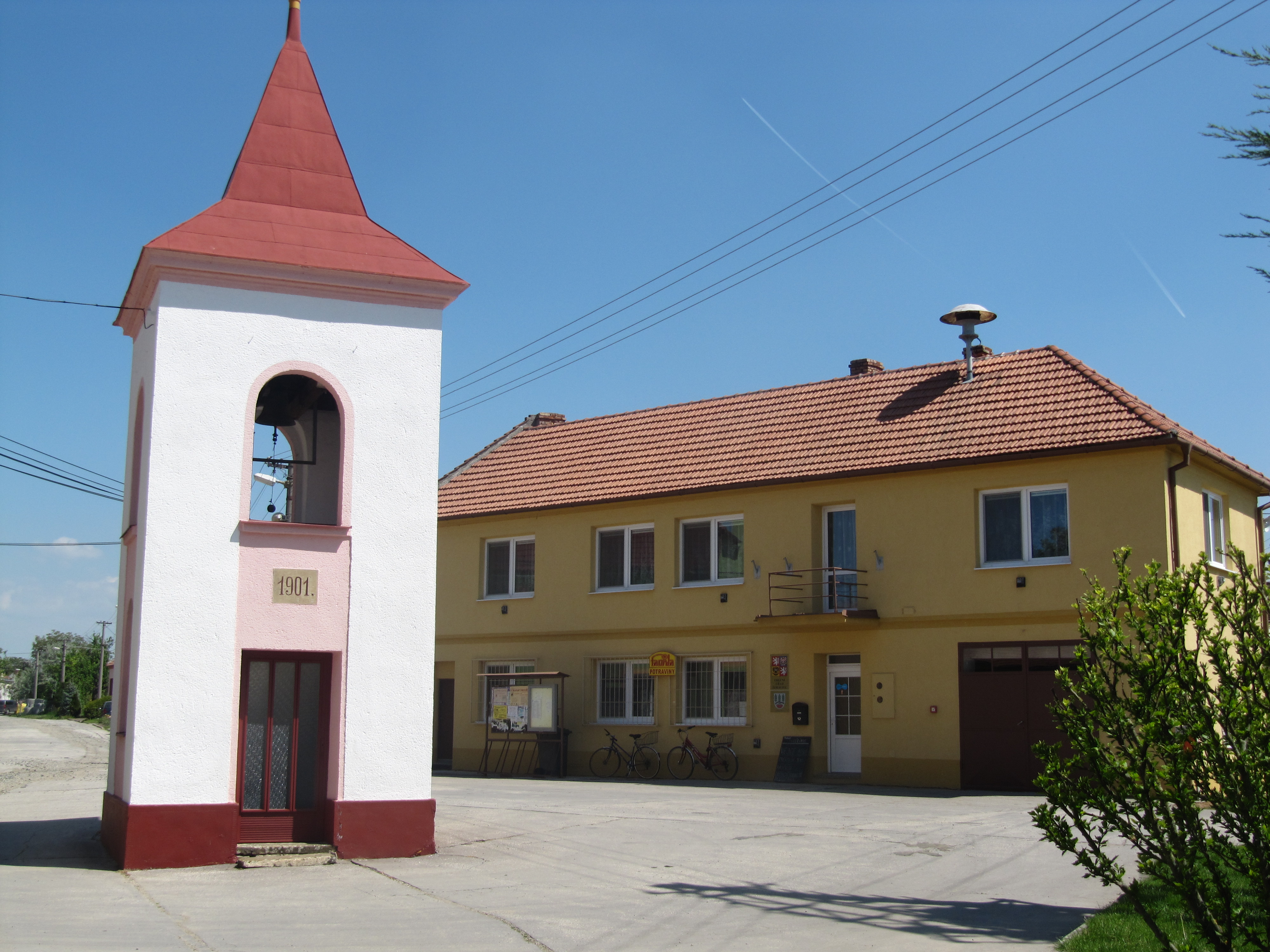
- Belfry and municipal office

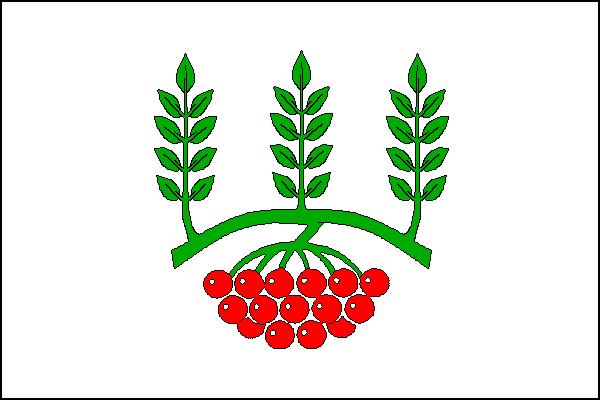
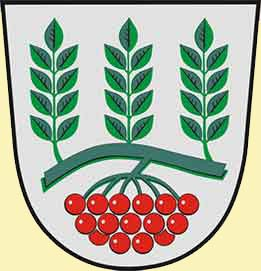
- Flag Coat of arms

- Location in the Czech Republic
- Coordinates: 48°54′30″N 17°23′29″E
- Country: Czech Republic
- Region: South Moravian
- District: Hodonín
- First mentioned: 1447

Area
  - Total: 2.31 km^{2} (0.89 sq mi)
- Elevation: 187 m (614 ft)

Population (2026-01-01)
  - Total: 188
  - Density: 81.4/km^{2} (211/sq mi)
- Time zone: UTC+1 (CET)
  - Summer (DST): UTC+2 (CEST)
- Postal code: 696 63
- Website: www.zeraviny.cz

Žeraviny is a municipality and village in Hodonín District in the South Moravian Region of the Czech Republic. It has about 200 inhabitants.

Žeraviny lies approximately 20 kilometres (12 mi) east of Hodonín, 65 km (40 mi) south-east of Brno, and 252 km (157 mi) south-east of Prague.

== Demographics ==
Historical population
Year	Pop.	±%
1869	278	—
1880	301	+8.3%
1890	282	−6.3%
1900	295	+4.6%
1910	295	+0.0%
1921	282	−4.4%
1930	290	+2.8%
1950	247	−14.8%
1961	270	+9.3%
1970	240	−11.1%
1980	220	−8.3%
1991	173	−21.4%
2001	186	+7.5%
2011	187	+0.5%
2021	176	−5.9%
Source: Censuses
