= Terezín (Hodonín District) =

- Municipality
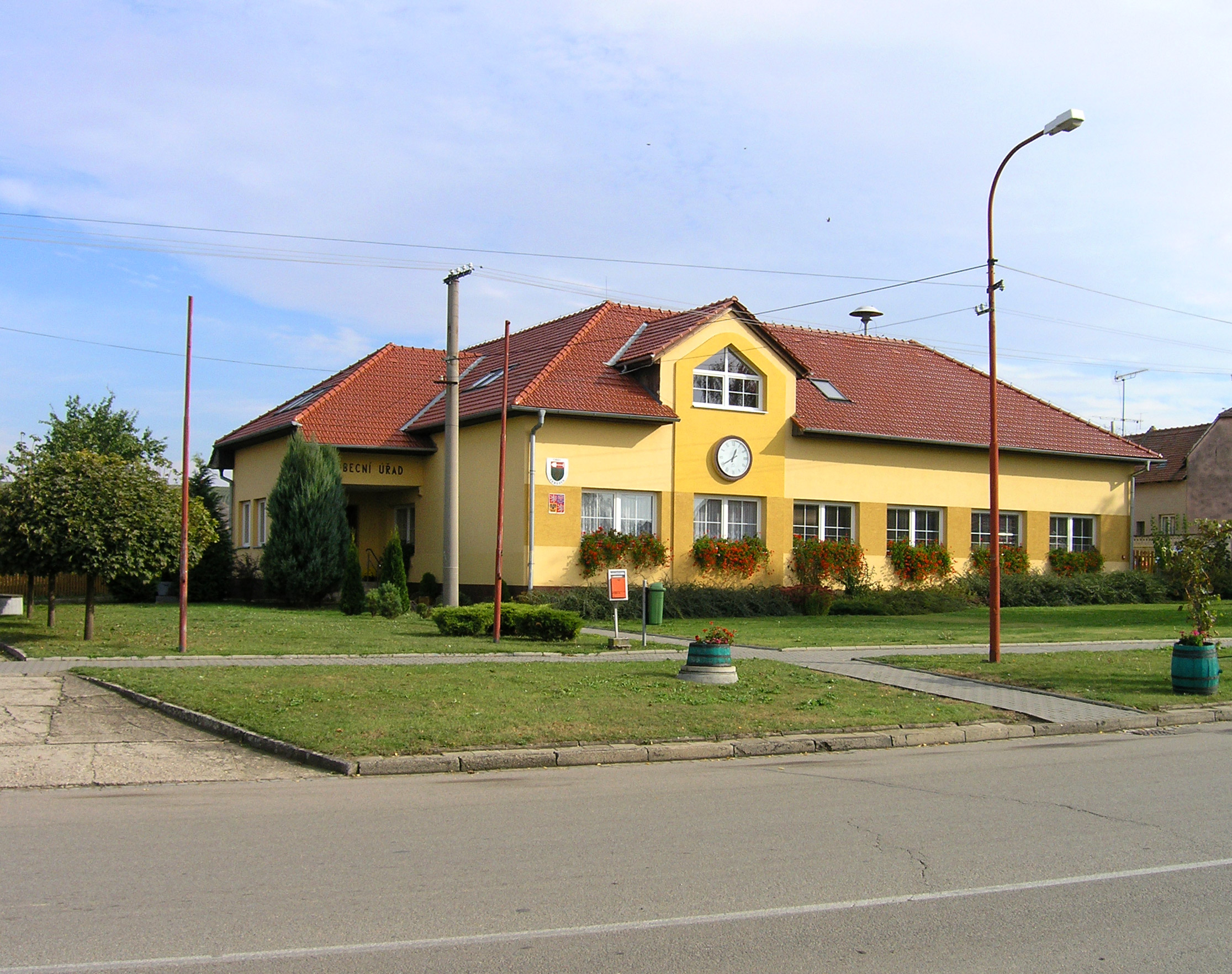
- Municipal office

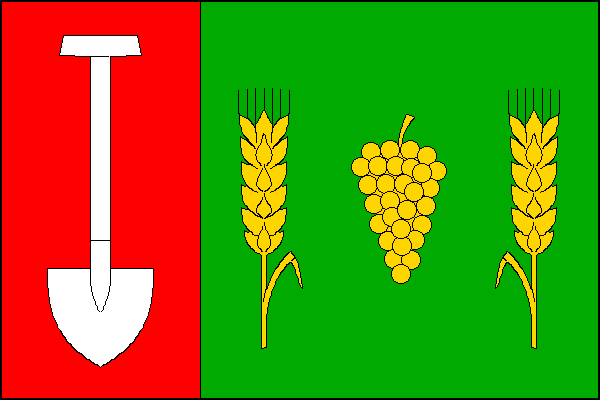
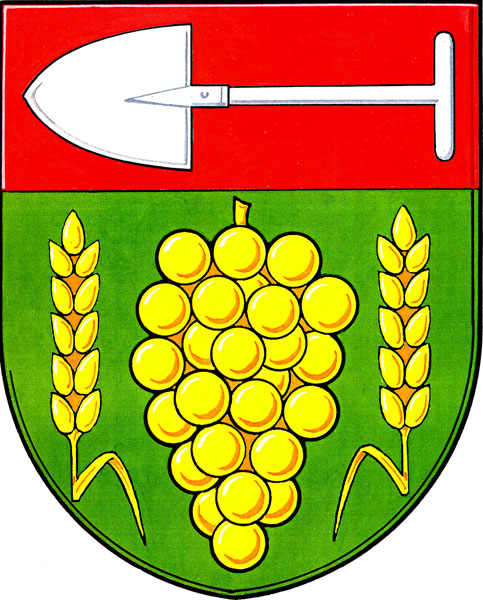
- Flag Coat of arms

- Location in the Czech Republic
- Coordinates: 48°57′20″N 16°56′33″E
- Country: Czech Republic
- Region: South Moravian
- District: Hodonín
- Founded: 1774

Area
  - Total: 3.74 km^{2} (1.44 sq mi)
- Elevation: 184 m (604 ft)

Population (2026-01-01)
  - Total: 387
  - Density: 103/km^{2} (268/sq mi)
- Time zone: UTC+1 (CET)
  - Summer (DST): UTC+2 (CEST)
- Postal code: 696 14
- Website: www.obecterezin.cz

Terezín (German: Theresiendorf) is a municipality and village in Hodonín District in the South Moravian Region of the Czech Republic. It has about 400 inhabitants.

Terezín lies approximately 19 kilometres (12 mi) north-west of Hodonín, 36 km (22 mi) south-east of Brno, and 222 km (138 mi) south-east of Prague.

== Demographics ==
Historical population
Year	Pop.	±%
1869	308	—
1880	339	+10.1%
1890	371	+9.4%
1900	433	+16.7%
1910	449	+3.7%
1921	472	+5.1%
1930	491	+4.0%
1950	436	−11.2%
1961	505	+15.8%
1970	486	−3.8%
1980	458	−5.8%
1991	377	−17.7%
2001	400	+6.1%
2011	399	−0.2%
2021	372	−6.8%
Source: Censuses
