= Mouchnice =

- Municipality
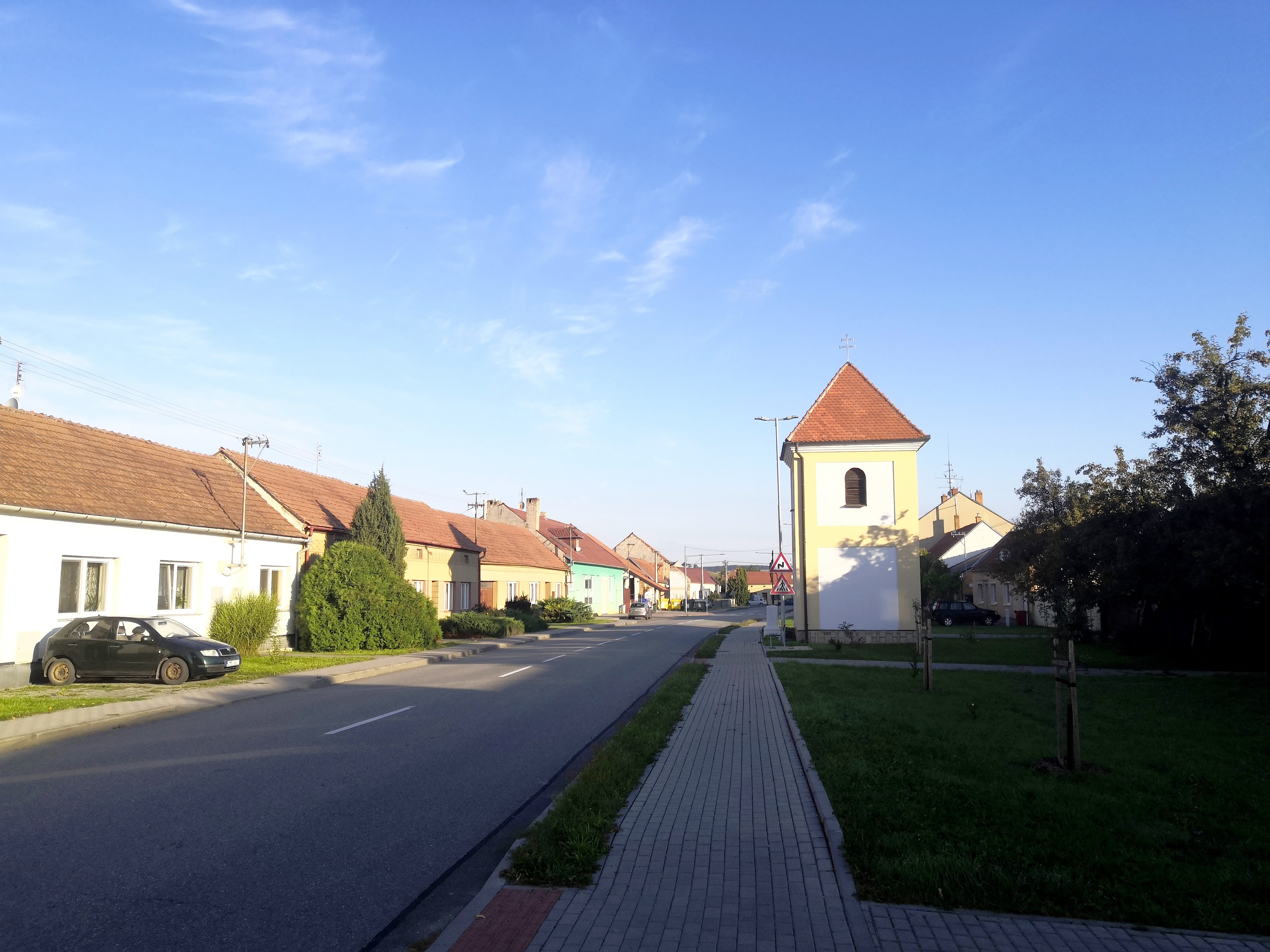
- Centre of Mouchnice

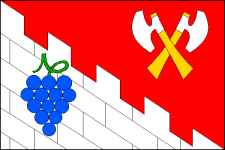
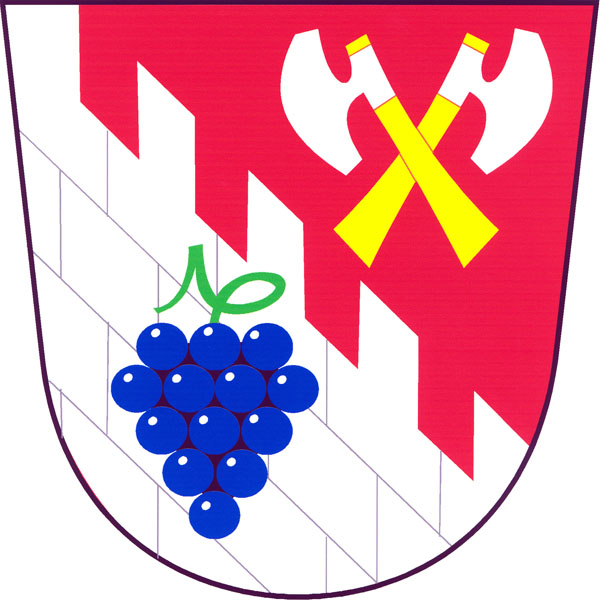
- Flag Coat of arms

- Location in the Czech Republic
- Coordinates: 49°6′42″N 17°8′8″E
- Country: Czech Republic
- Region: South Moravian
- District: Hodonín
- First mentioned: 1350

Area
  - Total: 12.77 km^{2} (4.93 sq mi)
- Elevation: 261 m (856 ft)

Population (2026-01-01)
  - Total: 318
  - Density: 24.9/km^{2} (64.5/sq mi)
- Time zone: UTC+1 (CET)
  - Summer (DST): UTC+2 (CEST)
- Postal code: 683 33
- Website: www.mouchnice.cz

Mouchnice (German: Mauchnitz) is a municipality and village in Hodonín District in the South Moravian Region of the Czech Republic. It has about 300 inhabitants.

Mouchnice lies approximately 30 kilometres (19 mi) north of Hodonín, 40 km (25 mi) east of Brno, and 224 km (139 mi) south-east of Prague.

== Demographics ==
Historical population
Year	Pop.	±%
1869	557	—
1880	581	+4.3%
1890	712	+22.5%
1900	751	+5.5%
1910	742	−1.2%
1921	786	+5.9%
1930	729	−7.3%
1950	611	−16.2%
1961	601	−1.6%
1970	522	−13.1%
1980	392	−24.9%
1991	356	−9.2%
2001	351	−1.4%
2011	321	−8.5%
2021	301	−6.2%
Source: Censuses
