= Stavěšice =

- Municipality
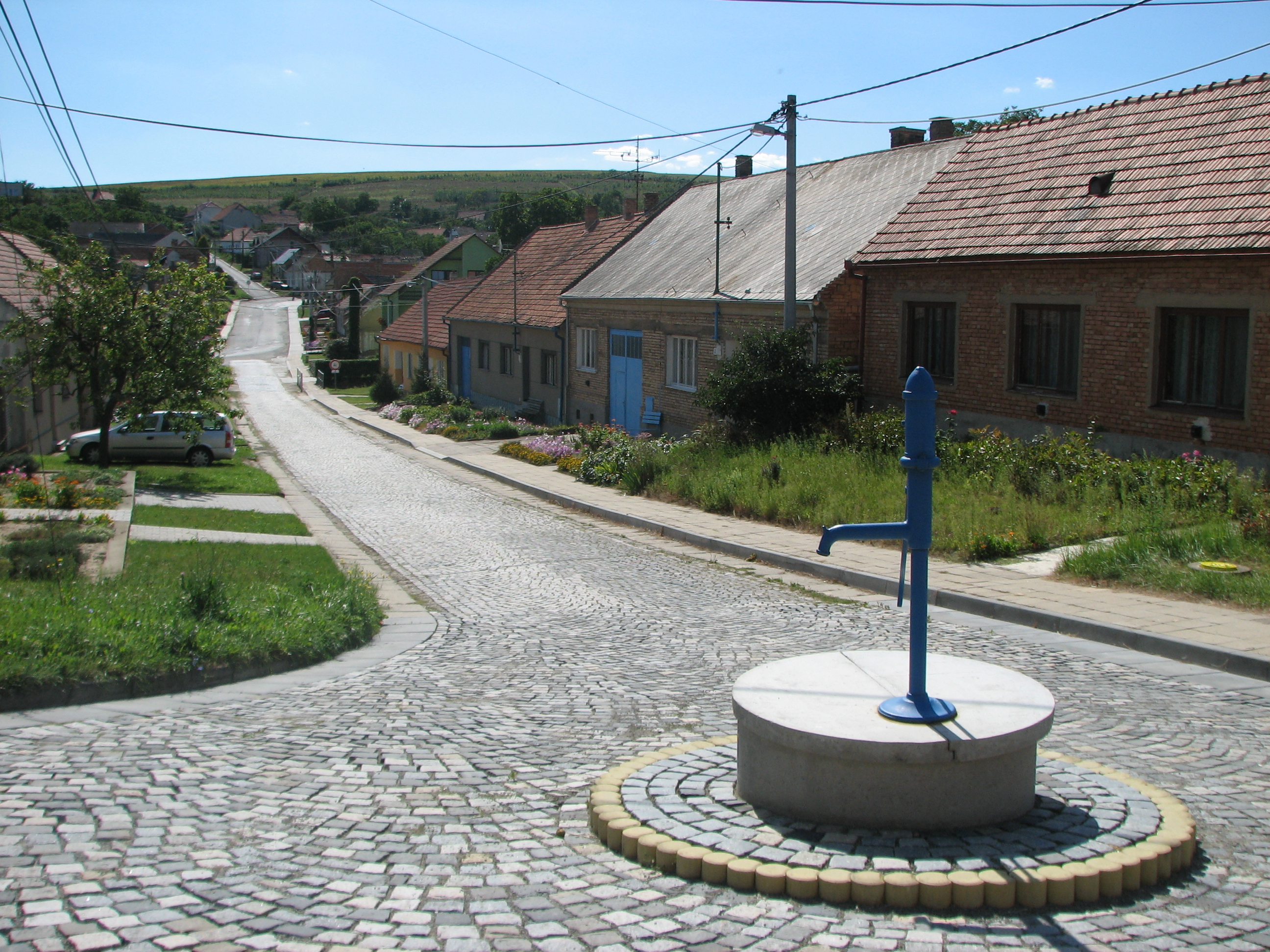
- A street in Stavěšice

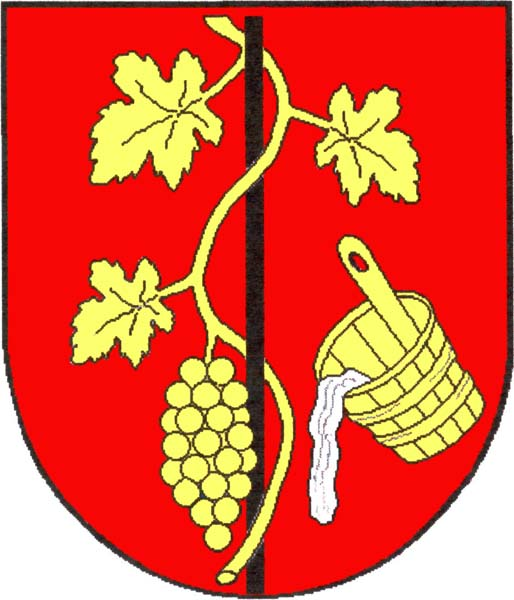
- Flag Coat of arms

- Location in the Czech Republic
- Coordinates: 49°0′6″N 17°1′50″E
- Country: Czech Republic
- Region: South Moravian
- District: Hodonín
- First mentioned: 1389

Area
  - Total: 4.94 km^{2} (1.91 sq mi)
- Elevation: 231 m (758 ft)

Population (2026-01-01)
  - Total: 378
  - Density: 76.5/km^{2} (198/sq mi)
- Time zone: UTC+1 (CET)
  - Summer (DST): UTC+2 (CEST)
- Postal code: 696 38
- Website: www.stavesice.eu

Stavěšice is a municipality and village in Hodonín District in the South Moravian Region of the Czech Republic. It has about 400 inhabitants.

Stavěšice lies approximately 19 kilometres (12 mi) north-west of Hodonín, 38 km (24 mi) south-east of Brno, and 224 km (139 mi) south-east of Prague.

== Demographics ==
Historical population
Year	Pop.	±%
1869	545	—
1880	597	+9.5%
1890	535	−10.4%
1900	646	+20.7%
1910	793	+22.8%
1921	770	−2.9%
1930	729	−5.3%
1950	595	−18.4%
1961	632	+6.2%
1970	596	−5.7%
1980	497	−16.6%
1991	364	−26.8%
2001	361	−0.8%
2011	330	−8.6%
2021	352	+6.7%
Source: Censuses
