= Ježov (Hodonín District) =

- Municipality
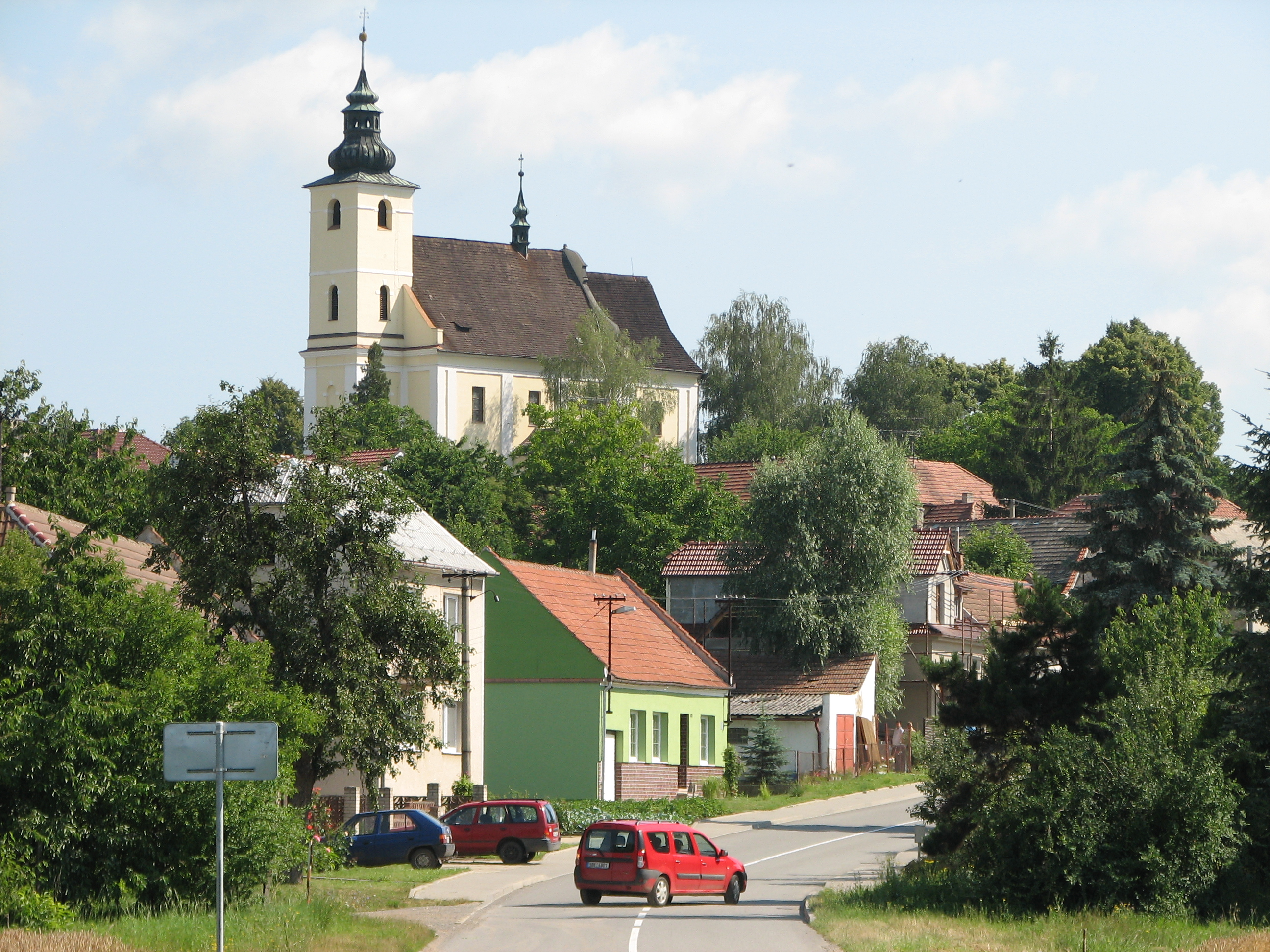
- Church of Saint James the Great

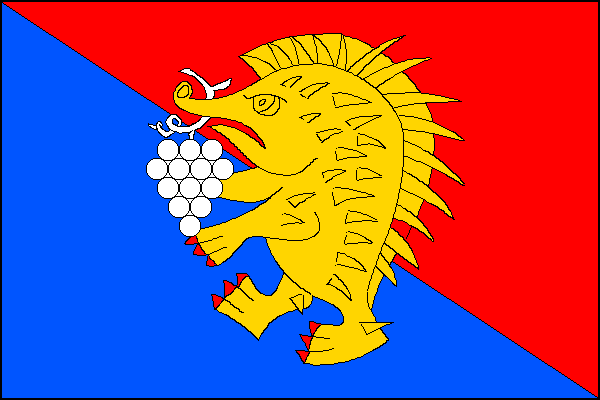
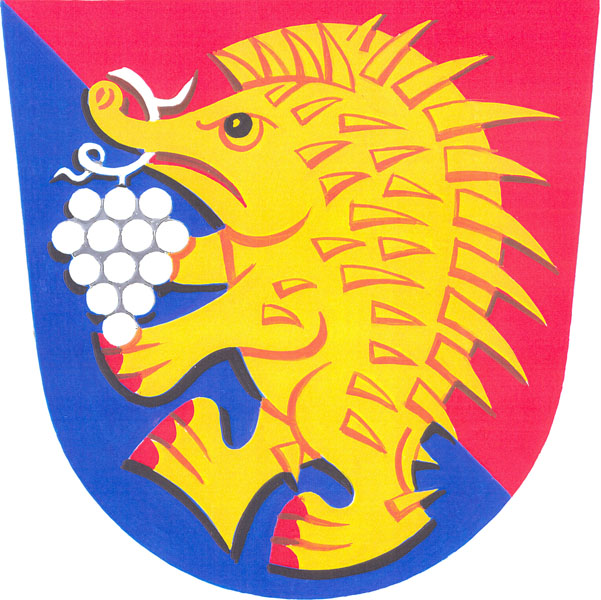
- Flag Coat of arms

- Location in the Czech Republic
- Coordinates: 49°1′37″N 17°12′36″E
- Country: Czech Republic
- Region: South Moravian
- District: Hodonín
- First mentioned: 1320

Area
  - Total: 5.92 km^{2} (2.29 sq mi)
- Elevation: 238 m (781 ft)

Population (2026-01-01)
  - Total: 703
  - Density: 119/km^{2} (308/sq mi)
- Time zone: UTC+1 (CET)
  - Summer (DST): UTC+2 (CEST)
- Postal code: 696 48
- Website: www.jezov.cz

Ježov (German: Jeschow) is a municipality and village in Hodonín District in the South Moravian Region of the Czech Republic. It has about 700 inhabitants.

Ježov lies approximately 21 kilometres (13 mi) north of Hodonín, 48 km (30 mi) south-east of Brno, and 234 km (145 mi) south-east of Prague.

== Demographics ==
Historical population
Year	Pop.	±%
1869	695	—
1880	781	+12.4%
1890	778	−0.4%
1900	842	+8.2%
1910	903	+7.2%
1921	861	−4.7%
1930	850	−1.3%
1950	781	−8.1%
1961	884	+13.2%
1970	835	−5.5%
1980	834	−0.1%
1991	731	−12.4%
2001	718	−1.8%
2011	695	−3.2%
2021	659	−5.2%
Source: Censuses
