= Antonín Chittussi =

Czech painter (1847–1891)

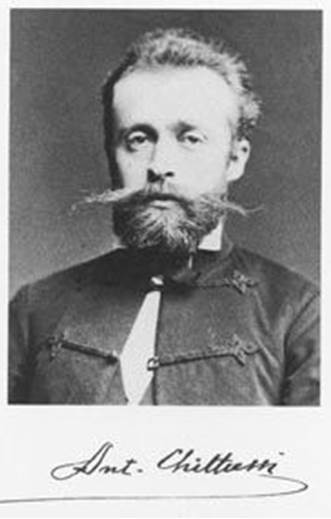

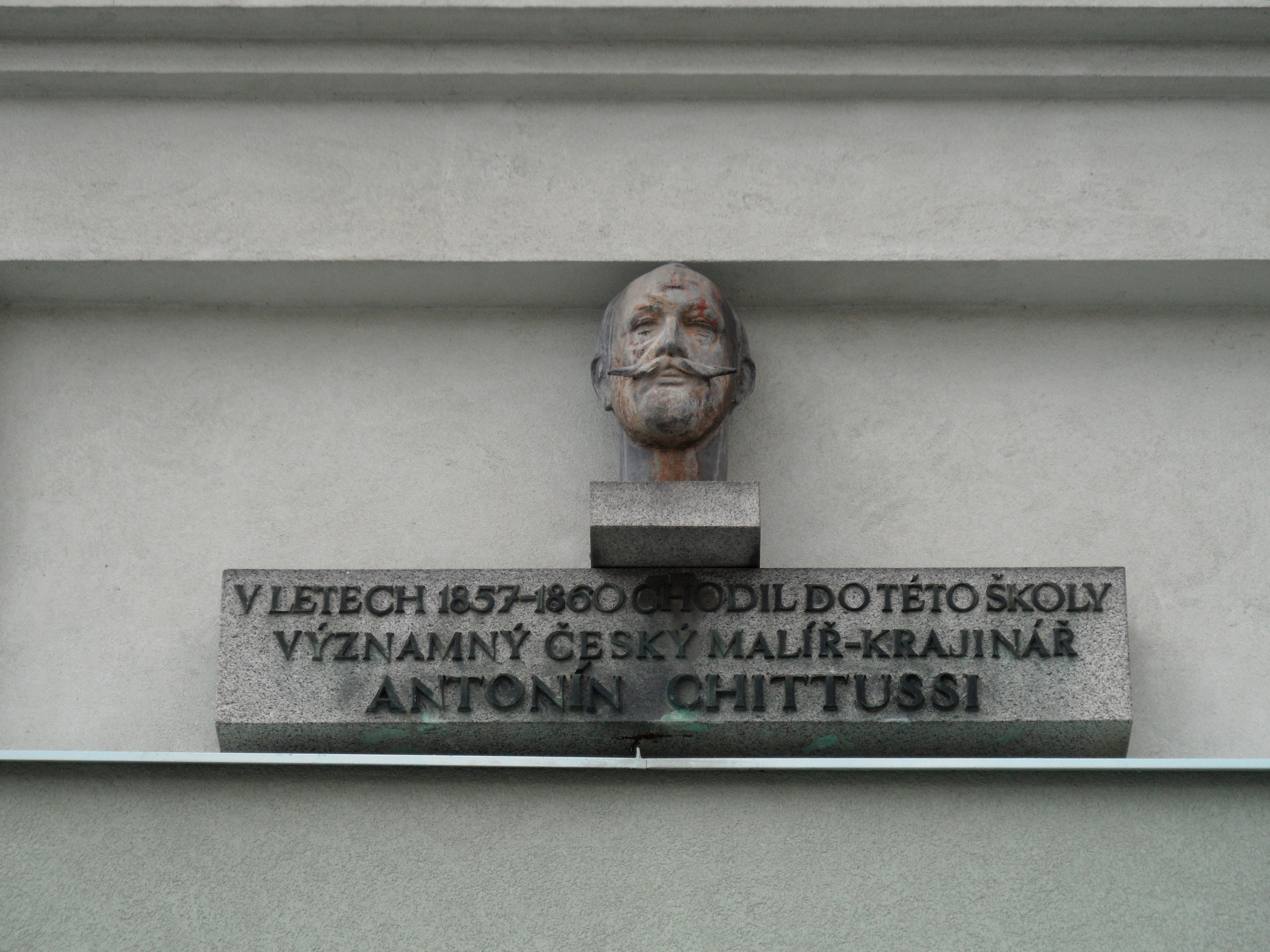
Memorial Plaque in Čáslav

Antonín Chittussi (1 December 1847 – 1 May 1891) was a Czech Impressionist landscape and cityscape painter.

== Early life ==
Chittussi was born on 1 December 1847 in Ronov nad Doubravou. He was born to an Italian father from a merchant family who lived in Ferrara, and moved to Bohemia during the Napoleonic Wars. Settling in Ronov, he married an innkeeper and later served as mayor. Initially, Chittussi was expected to follow in the family business, but displayed an aptitude for art, which was noticed by his grammar school teachers in Čáslav, so he was sent to Kutná Hora where he studied drawing with František Bohumír Zvěřina.

At the age of eighteen, Chittussi went to Prague, with the intent to study engineering. He enrolled at the Academy of Fine Arts instead, but unhappy with the courses being offered and went to Munich instead. Chittussi went to Vienna for military service, where he obtained a deferral, and briefly enrolled at the Academy of Fine Arts. Chittussi later returned to the Academy in Prague to study history painting. In 1876, he participated in a protest by Czech students against Alfred Woltmann, a Professor of art history at the University of Prague, who was accused of German chauvinism, forcing him to flee the lecture hall. Clashes between Czech and German students ensued. After a police investigation and five days in jail, Chittussi and Mikoláš Aleš, who were identified as the ringleaders, were expelled from the Academy.

== Career ==
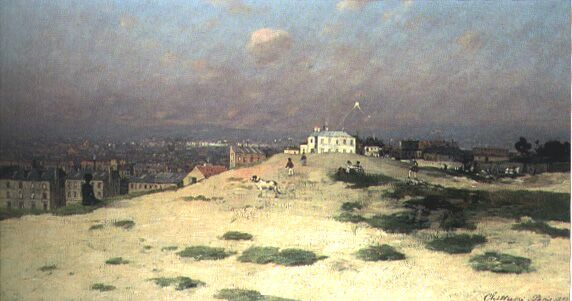
Parisian Suburb (1880s)

Chittussi supported himself by providing illustrations for Česká včela (lit. 'The Czech Bee') and other magazines. This work introduced him to Prague's patriotic social circles and found him a patron in František August Brauner, a member of the Imperial Council. He also befriended Brauner's daughter, Zdenka, an aspiring artist who influenced Chittussi's approach by introducing him to the work of the Barbizon school. In 1877, Chittussi and his school friend, František Ženíšek, opened a studio where he became primarily interested in landscapes.

As an army reservist following the Russo–Turkish War in 1878, Chittussi was called up and sent to the front. The death and destruction he witnessed had a profound effect on him, which he attempted to work through emotionally by corresponding with Zdenka. Chittussi made a series of small drawings and watercolors, which he exhibited on his return and, with the help of friends, succeeded in financing a trip to Paris.

=== The influence of Paris ===
Chittussi arrived in time for the "Fourth Impressionist Exhibition", but was not ready to accept what he saw, but eventually stated that most of his earlier works had "been in vain". In 1880, he rented a small studio and began to work on absorbing the new styles and gained the support of the writer Élémir Bourges, who would later marry Zdenka's sister, Anna. In 1882, he was invited to spend six months painting at the Radziwiłł estate near Ermenonville. The following year in 1883, Chittussi exhibited at the Salon. Despite being successful, he was ready to return home and held an auction of his works at the Hôtel Drouot in 1884. This meant an improvement of his relationship with Zdenka, as she actually began to spend more time in Paris than before, pursuing her career.

== Personal life ==
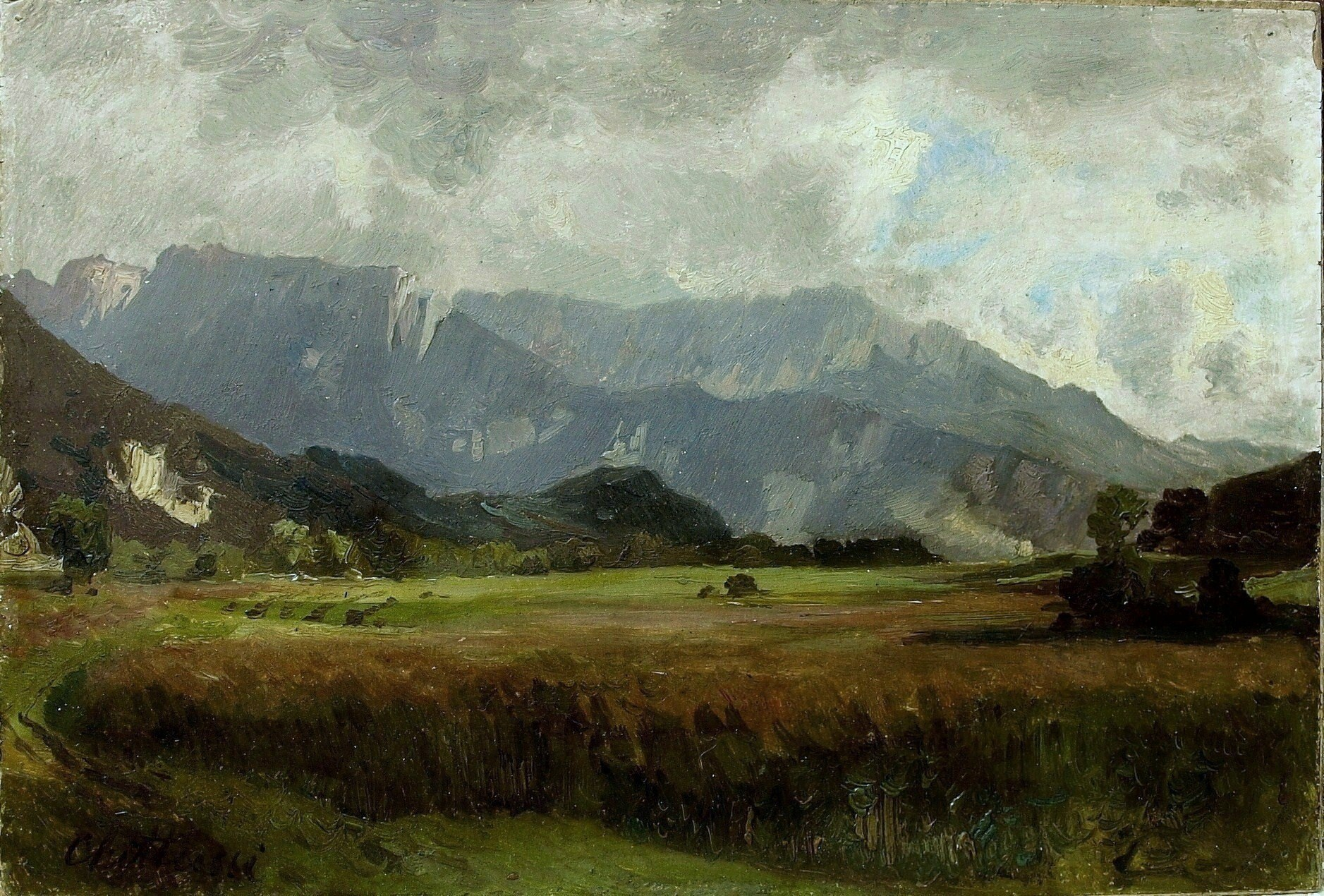
View of the Tatra Mountains (1890)

Chittussi's distant relative, Adriana, lived in Nová Cerekev with her three children.

Chittussi soon discovered an area in Southern Bohemia that inspired him to paint and helped him to assuage his hurt feelings. Shortly afterwards, he settled near Člunek. In 1887, Chittussi developed health problems, which were believed to be related to the time he spent outdoors, painting during inclement weather. He gradually grew weaker and was diagnosed with tuberculosis. In an effort to stop the disease' progress, he went to the Tatra Mountains.

Chittussi died in Prague on the way home from treatment in 1891. A street in the Bubeneč district there is named after him and, in 1997, the Czech government used one of his paintings – a castle in Chantilly – on a postage stamp.
