= Uprka =

Uprka is a surname. Notable people with the surname include:

- Franta Úprka (1868–1929), Czech sculptor
- Joža Uprka (1861–1940), Czech painter
