= Zdenka Braunerová =

Czech artist (1858–1934)

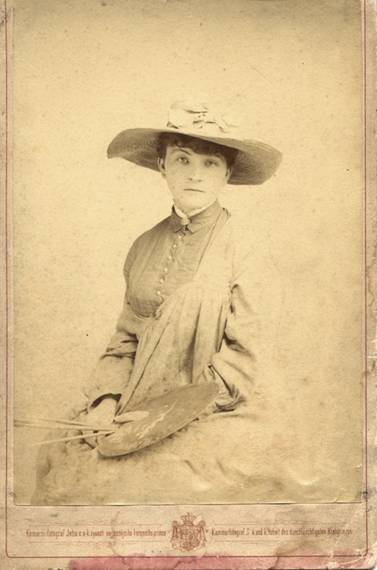
Zdenka Braunerová (1883)

Zdislava Rosalina Augusta Braunerová, called Zdenka (9 April 1858 – 23 May 1934) was a Czech landscape painter, illustrator and graphic artist, whose work was influenced by her connection to Paris. She was the first female member of the Mánes Union of Fine Arts, and a patron of numerous other Czech artists.

== Biography ==
Braunerová was born on 9 April 1858 in Prague, Austrian Empire. She was born into a wealthy family. Her father was František August Brauner, a member of the Imperial Council. She developed her interest in art from her mother, Augusta, who was an amateur painter. Prominent writers and artists were regular guests at her home. As her talents became apparent, she began taking lessons from Amalie Mánesová. Later, she studied with Soběslav Pinkas.

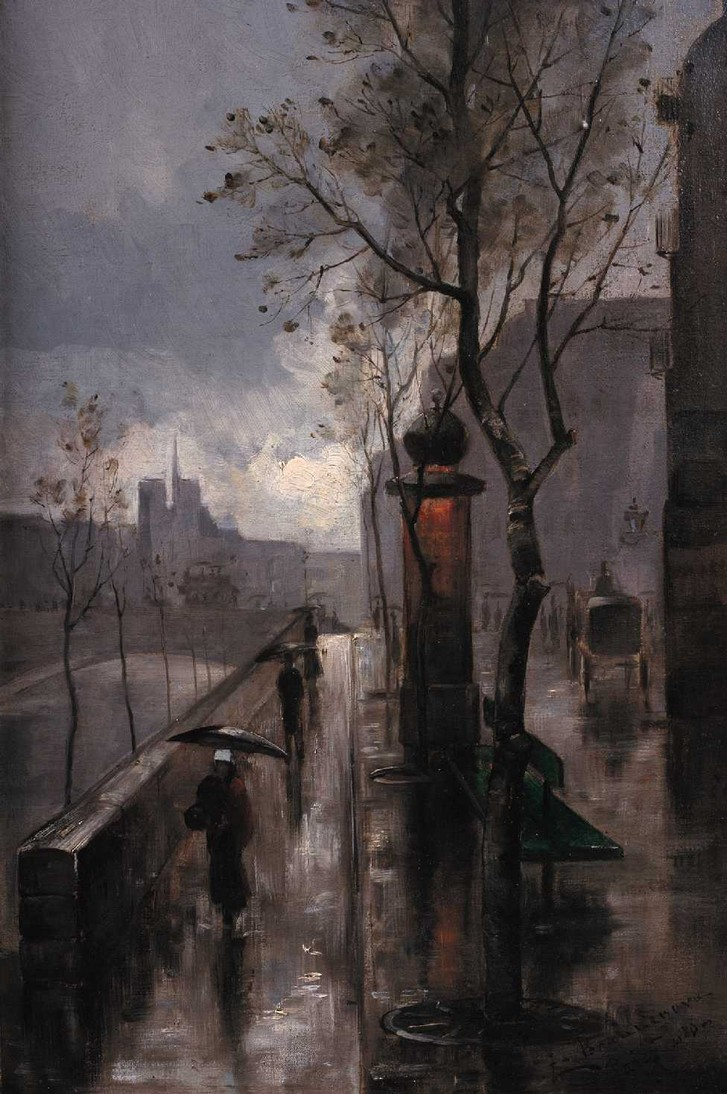
In Paris (1886)

All of this was in addition to her regular education, and her parents were taken by surprise when she informed them that she had decided to pursue painting as a profession, but they could not dissuade her. In part, this decision may have been prompted by her meeting with Antonín Chittussi, a young painter with whom she would develop a long friendship, verging on a romance. The relationship cooled, however, toward the end of Chittussi's life, as did one with Julius Zeyer, who was seventeen years her senior. Later, a planned marriage to Vilém Mrštík was called off at the last minute.

=== After 1880 ===
A major inspiration for her art was Paris, where she spent part of each year from 1881 to 1893, and the painters of the Barbizon school. Her future brother-in-law, Élémir Bourges, served as her guide and introduced her to many literary figures such as Maurice Maeterlinck and Anatole France. While there, she also attended the Académie Colarossi and exhibited frequently; in Paris at the Salon and in Prague at the Rudolfinum. However, through all of these years, she never abandoned her connections to her homeland, often taking part in performances where she would dance in Czech costumes and sing folk songs. She had, in fact considered becoming a singer before turning to art. In 1896, she became the first female member of the Mánes Union of Fine Arts, but was apparently expelled in 1906.

Later, she opened a studio in Roztoky and, in 1902, she extended an invitation to Auguste Rodin to visit Bohemia and Moravia. In 1909, she developed a close friendship with Paul Claudel, who was serving as the French consul in Prague. She also had one last affair, probably platonic, with the writer Miloš Marten. He was twenty-five years younger and her family was scandalized, but he died in 1917 from wounds suffered in World War I. Roztoky would be her home for the rest of her life, and she would draw inspiration from the rural people and landscapes, while keeping a detailed diary and series of sketchbooks. She continued to exhibit until 1932 and died while staying at her family's home in Prague.

In addition to her painting, she was also a printmaker, book designer and glass engraver. For many years, she was involved in efforts to help prevent the destruction of the Staré Město (the Medieval section of Prague) and Josefov (the old Jewish ghetto). As part of this effort, she created a series of prints depicting the area. Many younger artists, such as František Bílek, Jan Zrzavý and Joža Uprka, received financial support from her.

She died on 23 May 1934 in Prague, at the age of 76. She was buried at the Vyšehrad Cemetery.

== Selected paintings ==
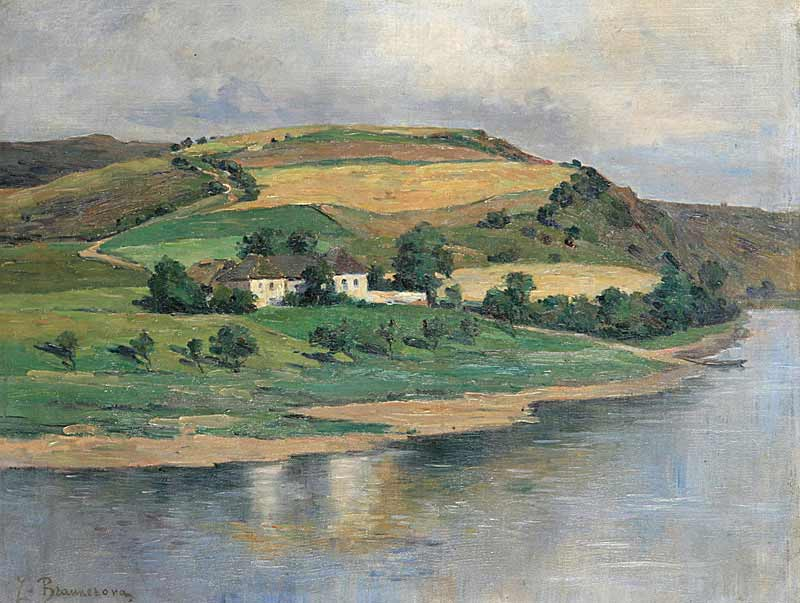
A Bend in the Vltava

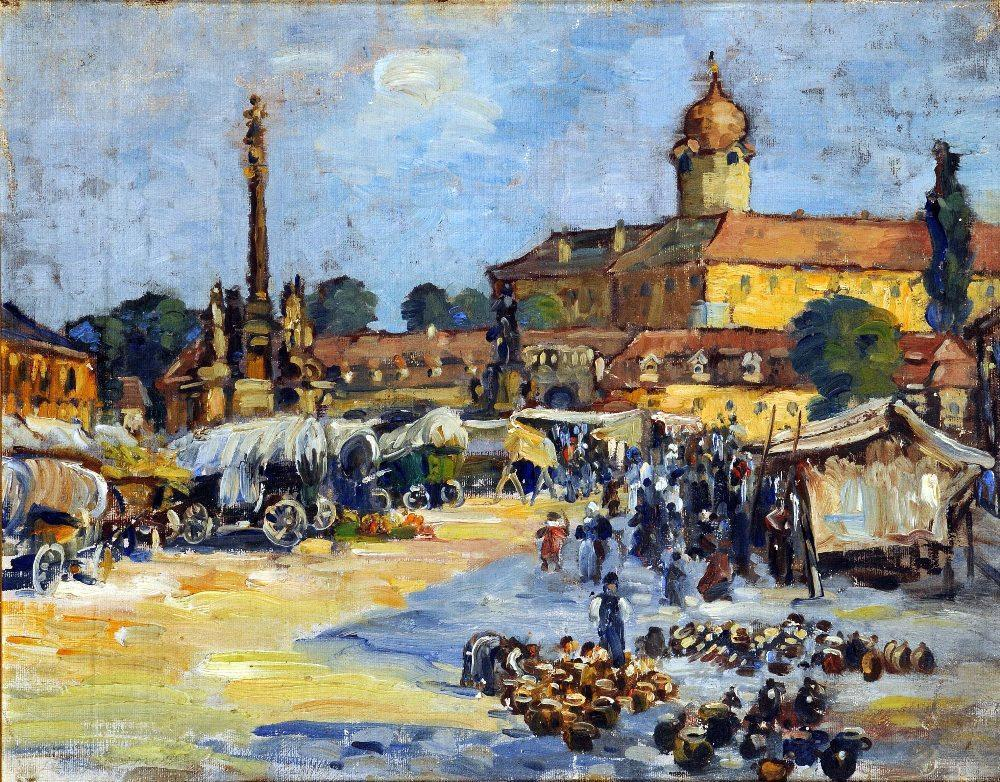
Town Market Square with Figures

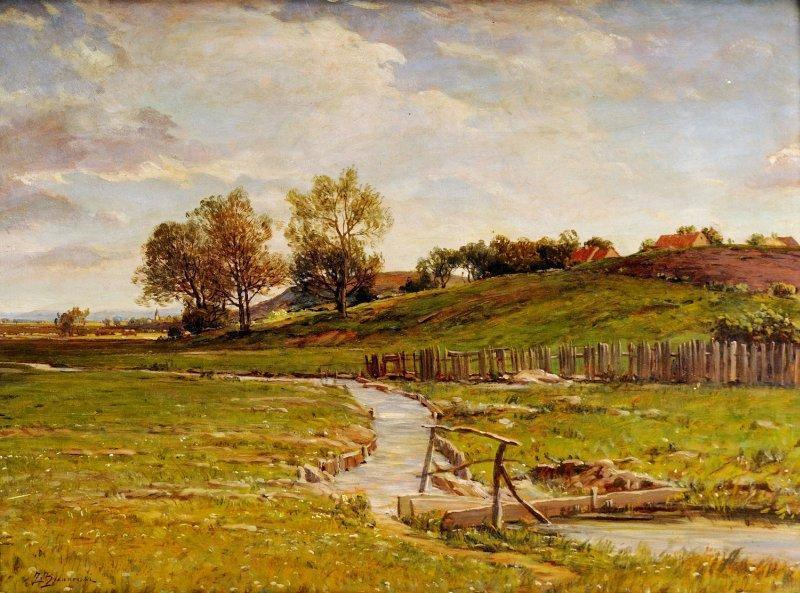
Landscape with Stream
