= Běhařov =

- Municipality
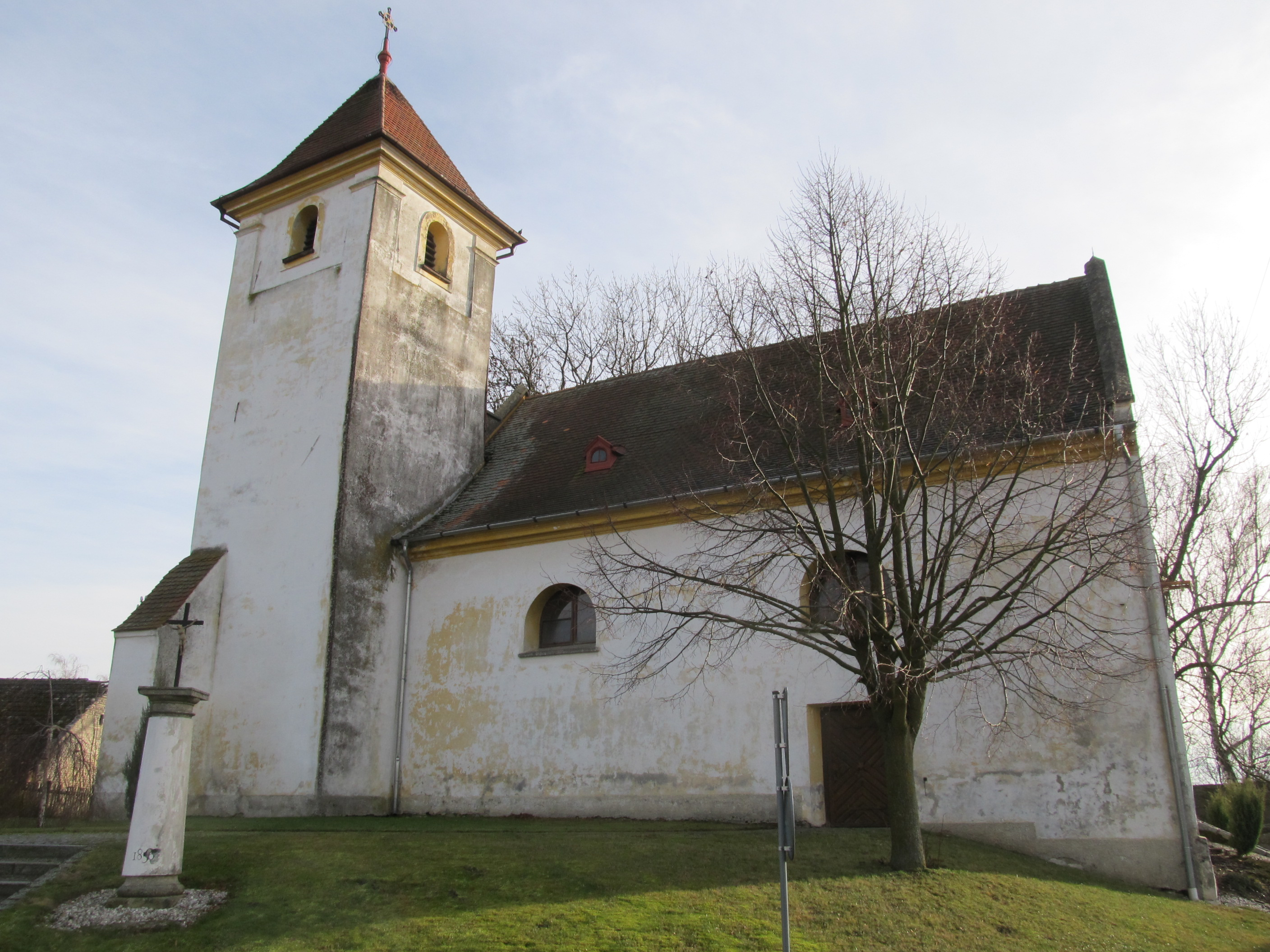
- Church of Saint Procopius

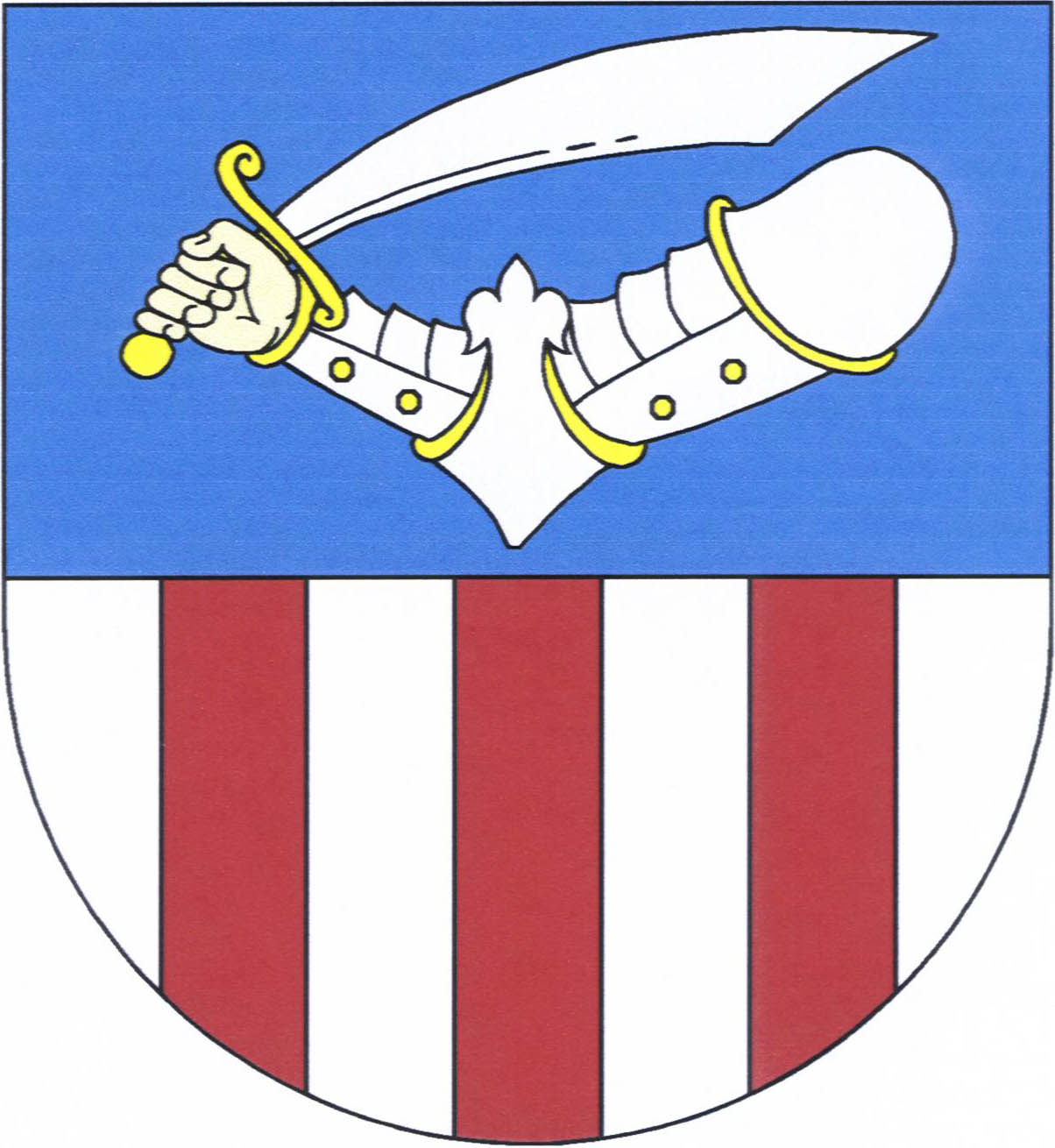
- Flag Coat of arms

- Location in the Czech Republic
- Coordinates: 49°20′42″N 13°9′37″E
- Country: Czech Republic
- Region: Plzeň
- District: Klatovy
- First mentioned: 1352

Area
  - Total: 4.37 km^{2} (1.69 sq mi)
- Elevation: 485 m (1,591 ft)

Population (2026-01-01)
  - Total: 191
  - Density: 43.7/km^{2} (113/sq mi)
- Time zone: UTC+1 (CET)
  - Summer (DST): UTC+2 (CEST)
- Postal code: 340 21
- Website: www.beharov.cz

Běhařov (German: Wihorschau) is a municipality and village in Klatovy District in the Plzeň Region of the Czech Republic. It has about 200 inhabitants.

== Administrative division ==
Běhařov consists of two municipal parts (in brackets population according to the 2021 census):

- Běhařov (116)
- Úborsko (50)

== Etymology ==
The name is derived from the surname Běhař, meaning "Běhař's (court)".

== Geography ==
Běhařov is located about 11 kilometres (7 mi) southwest of Klatovy and 46 km (29 mi) south of Plzeň. It lies in the Švihov Highlands. The highest point is at 592 m (1,942 ft) above sea level. The Úhlava River flows along the southern municipal border.

== History ==
The first written mention of Běhařov is from 1352, when the village with a fortress were owned by the local noble family that called themselves Barons of Běhařov. Běhařov often changed hands and was owned by various lesser noblemen. During the Thirty Years' War, it became part of the Bystřice estate (today Bystřice nad Úhlavou, part of Nýřany).

== Demographics ==
Historical population

Year	Pop.	±%
1869	514	—
1880	533	+3.7%
1890	468	−12.2%
1900	475	+1.5%
1910	459	−3.4%

Year	Pop.	±%
1921	479	+4.4%
1930	417	−12.9%
1950	306	−26.6%
1961	262	−14.4%
1970	217	−17.2%

Year	Pop.	±%
1980	179	−17.5%
1991	149	−16.8%
2001	152	+2.0%
2011	221	+45.4%
2021	166	−24.9%

Source: Censuses

== Transport ==
There are no railways or major roads passing through the municipality.

== Sights ==
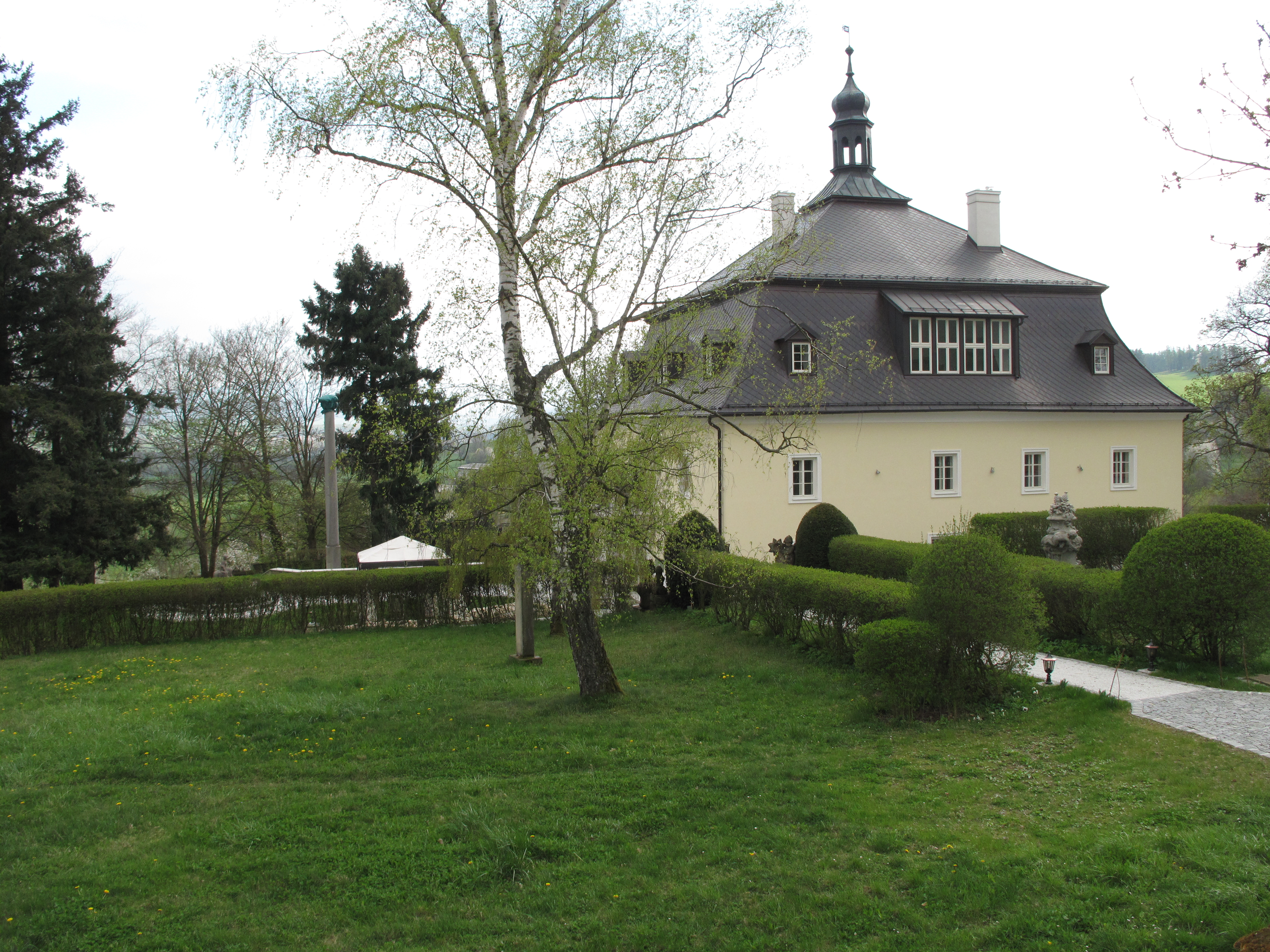
Běhařov Castle

The main landmarks of Běhařov are the Church of Saint Procopius and Běhařov Castle. The church was built in the early Gothic style in the mid-13th century, but it was damaged by the fires in 1616, 1777 and 1789, and was reconstructed in the Baroque style. The tower was raised in 1693. The last large reconstruction of the church was after the fire in 1911.

The Běhařov Castle was originally a Gothic-Renaissance fortress, rebuilt to its present Baroque form in the first half of the 18th century. In 1917, the castle was bought by the painter Alois Kalvoda. He had reconstructed the building, founded a summer painting school here and decorated the landscape park around the castle with sculptures by Jan Štursa, Franta Úprka and Josef Drahoňovský.

== Notable people ==
- Alois Kalvoda (1875–1934), painter; lived and died here
