= Ride of the Kings (Uprka) =

1892 painting by Joža Uprka

- Jízda králů (Czech)
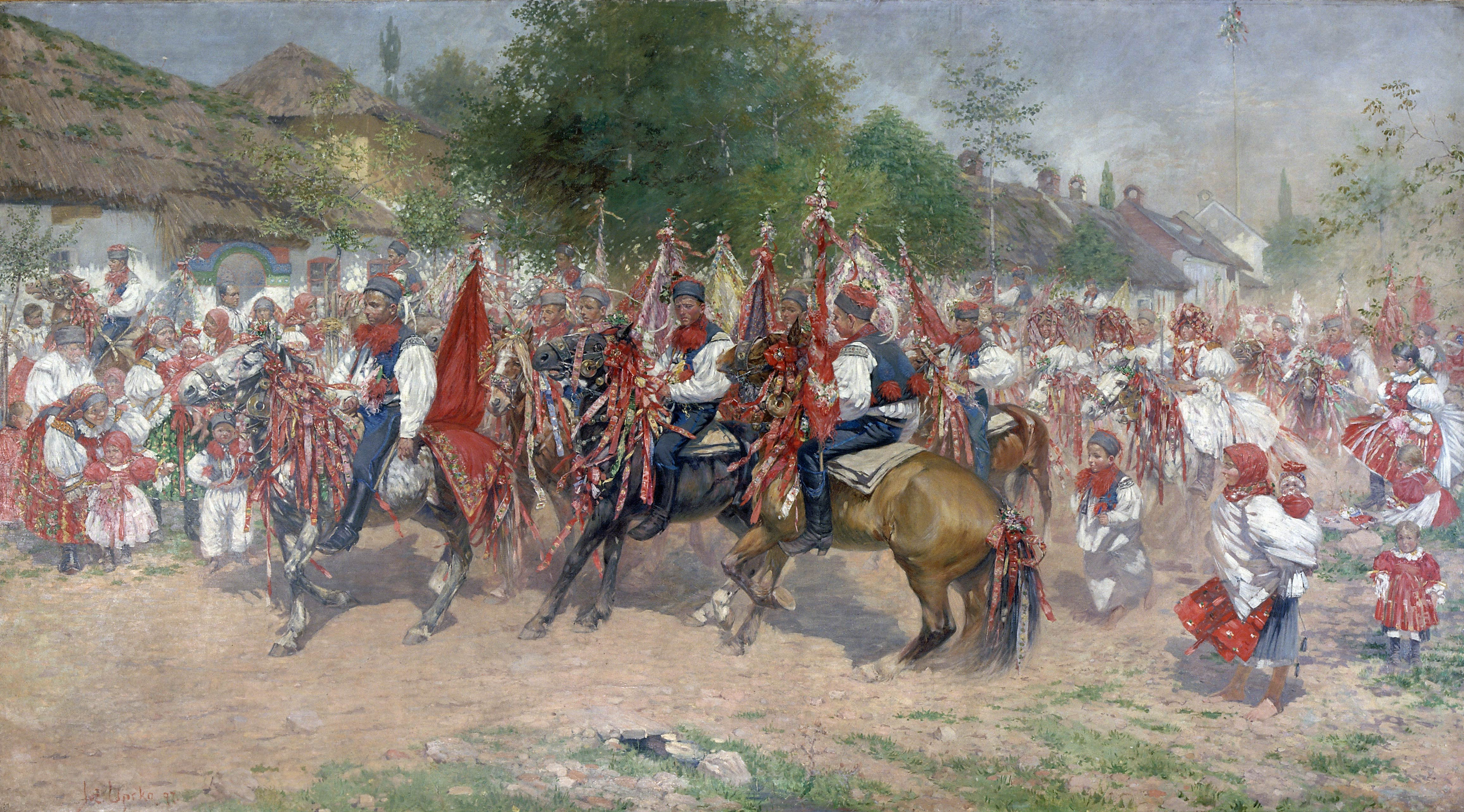
- Artist: Joža Uprka
- Year: 1892
- Medium: oil on canvas
- Dimensions: 173 cm × 312 cm (68 in × 123 in)
- Location: Moravian Gallery; Brno

The Ride of Kings is an 1892 painting by the Czech artist Joža Uprka.

== Description ==
Oil on canvas, the 173 x 312 cm. image is part of the collection of the Moravian Gallery in Brno, Czech Republic.

== Analysis ==
This iconic painting captures the rural life in the Moravian Slovakia region in the southeast of the Czech Republic. It depicts the folk festival Ride of the Kings, which is celebrated in the spring at Pentecost. The celebration begins with a church service and a greeting by the mayor, then follow the final preparations of the costumes of the participants and the decoration of the horses. Ornamental decorations and costumes are made by the women, and each one has a different colour and pattern, depending on which village the participant comes from. The participants are about 15-26 young men preceded by singers and an "honor guard": a boy aged between 10 and 15 years, who carries a sword to protect the "King". the boy's face is partially covered and in his mouth he's holding a rose. The King and his entourage are dressed in women's clothes while everyone else is in men's attire.
