= Antoš Frolka =

Czech painter (1877–1935)

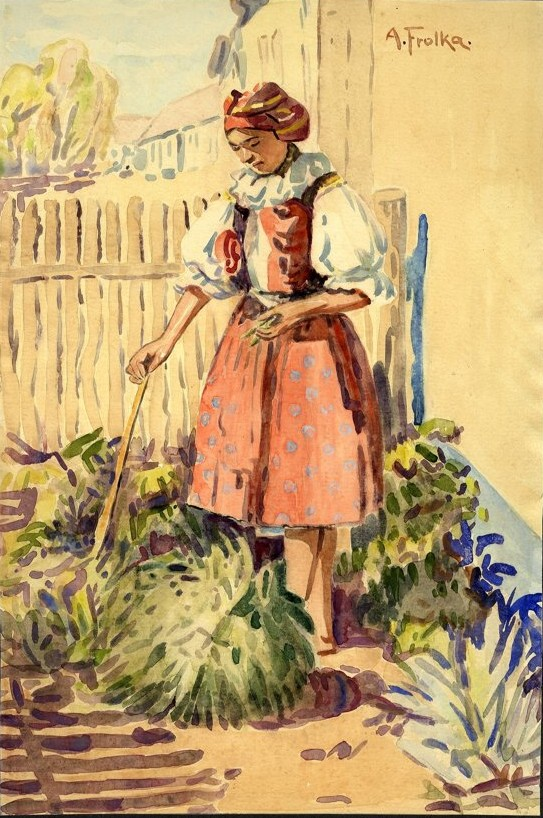
Krojovaná dívka při práci na zahradě (Costumed girl working in the garden); oil on canvas

Antoš Frolka (13 June 1877 – 8 June 1935), was a Czech painter of folk scenes.

== Biography ==
Frolka was born in Kněždub in South Moravia. From a poor family, he was partly self-taught, and partly taught by Joža Uprka. He tried and failed to study at the Academy of Fine Arts in Prague, spent some time at the Academy of Fine Arts in Vienna and the academy in Munich. In 1907 he joined the Association of Moravian Artists. In 1914 he received a scholarship to study in Paris, but had to abandon this after six months at the outbreak of the World War I. Mobilized and sent to the Eastern Front, Frolka experienced a severe crisis of creativity after the end of the war.

== Paintings ==
Frolka's painting was devoted to the "small moments of everyday life" and to the folk culture of Moravia and Slovakia. He dressed always in Moravian costume and spoke in Moravian dialect. He became widely known as a painter of the Czech and Slovak national revival.

== Bibliography ==
- Dušan Holý and Ludmila Holá, Antoš Frolka: Mezi paletou a písní. O malíři Frolkovi a jeho rodině. Brno : Host, 2000. ISBN 80-7294-001-5.
- Jiří Pajer, Antoš Frolka: reprodukované malířské dílo. Strážnice : Nakladatelství Etnos, 2010. ISBN 978-80-904622-1-2.
