= Franta Úprka =

Czech sculptor

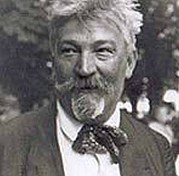
- Born: František Uprka; 26 February 1868; Kněždub, Austria-Hungary
- Died: 8 September 1929 (aged 61); Tuchoměřice, Czechoslovakia
- Spouse: Otilia Chramostová

Franta Úprka (8 September 1868 – 26 January 1929) was a Czech sculptor, with birthname František Uprka, the younger brother of folklife painter Joža Uprka (he used different surname diacritics from his brother).

== Life and work ==
He was born on 8 September 1868 in Kněždub. He was one of four children born to Jan Uprka, a farmer, and his wife Eva née Machálková, from Lipov. His father was also an amateur painter, which inspired him and his brother, Joža, to pursue careers in art. Those plans were interrupted by their father's early death, in 1874, after which their mother insisted on more practical career choices, such as teaching or the clergy. As a result, František was sent to the Piarist grammar school in Strážnice, but he performed poorly there and returned to help on the farm.

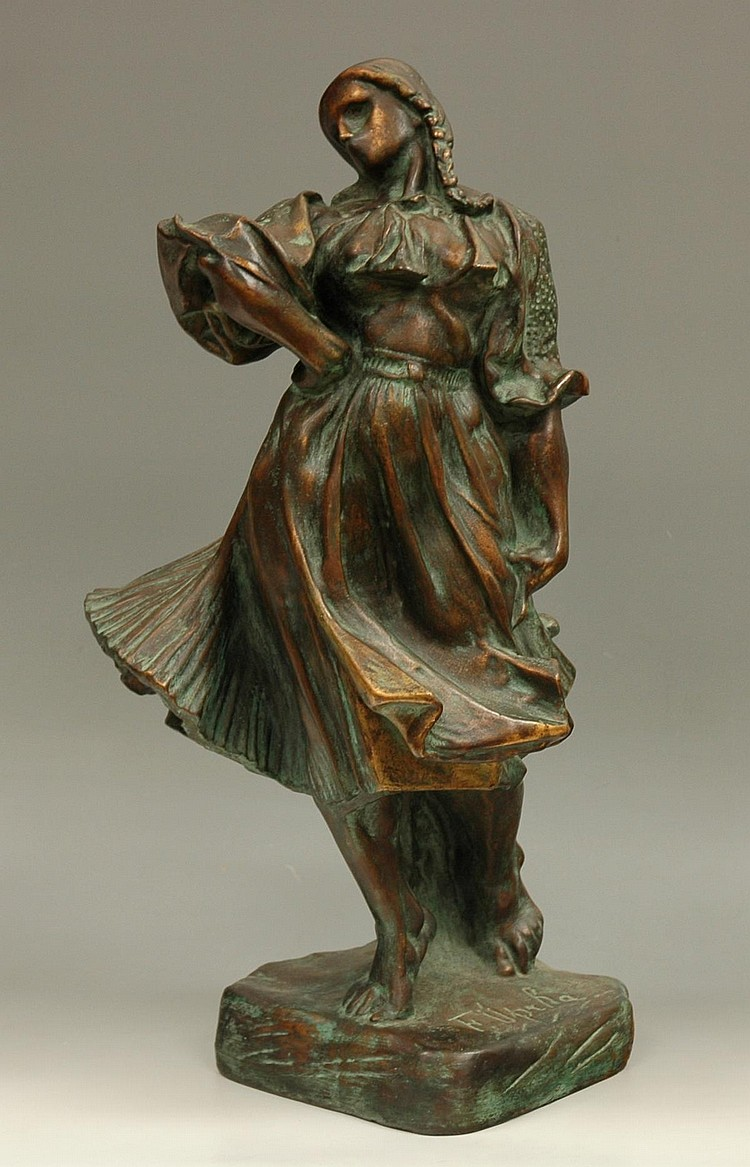
Dancing Girl

Later, he was able to follow his artistic inclinations; taking classes in woodcarving at a school in Valašské Meziříčí. He never finished his courses there, choosing instead to go to Prague, where he planned to study clay modelling at the Academy of Fine Arts with Josef Mauder. However, due to his incomplete primary education, he was not accepted at the Academy. He was able to find a position as an assistant in a stone carving firm. This enabled him to learn stonemasonry from Jindřich Václav Čapek, which led to lessons in sculpture from Antonín Pavel Wagner and Bohuslav Schnirch.

After completing his military service, in 1892, he made a study trip to several Czech and German cities; paying visits to schools that taught sculpture. In 1896, he settled in Prague, where he married Otilia Chramostová, the daughter of Josef Karel Chramosta, an actor and puppeteer at the Estates Theatre. He became a member of the Mánes Union of Fine Arts and, after 1903, began to exhibit with them. In 1906, he had a showing in Milan, followed by exhibits in Venice and Rome.

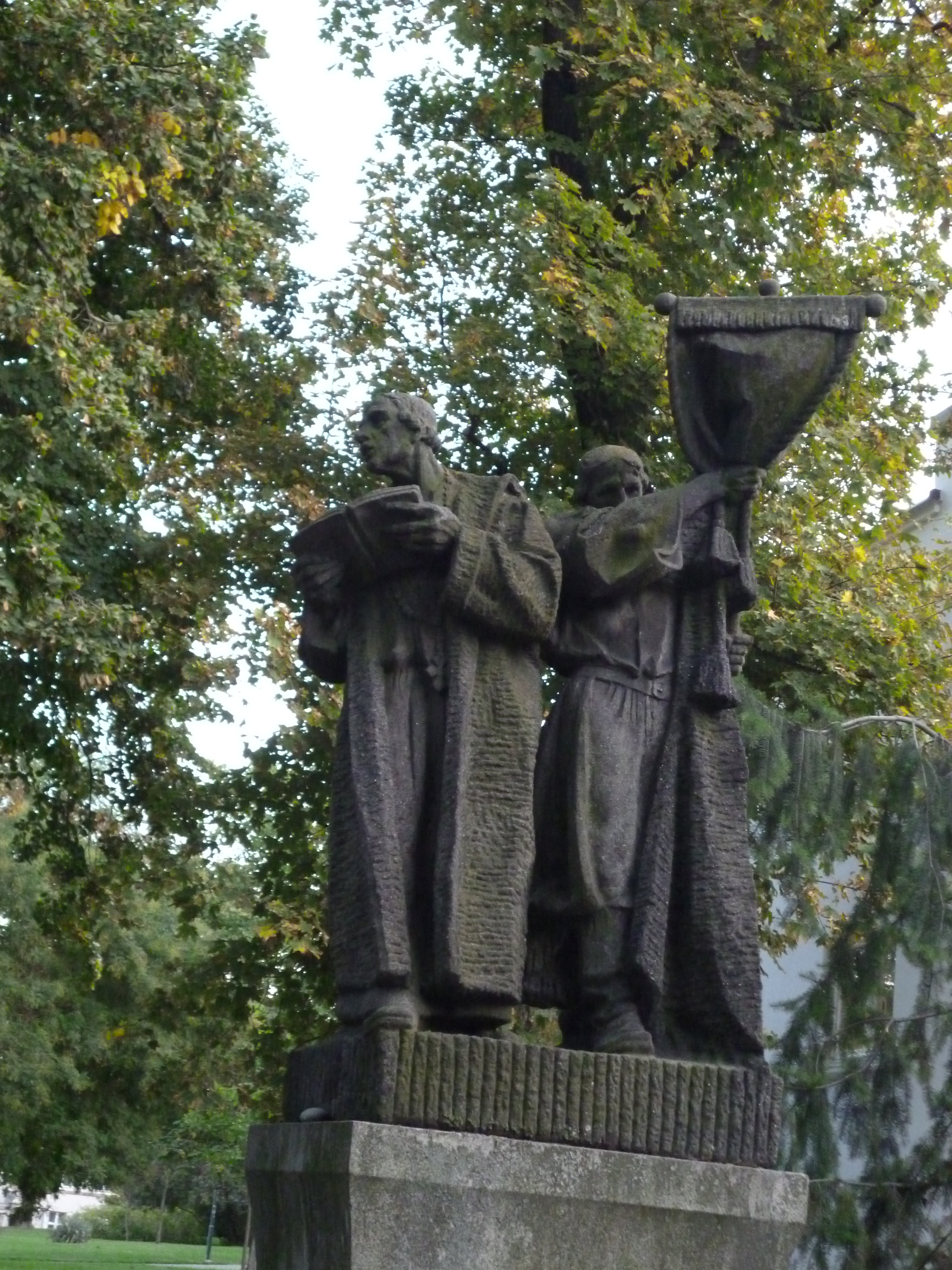
Pilgrims

In 1918, the famous Topičův salon reopened, after a seven year hiatus, with an exhibition featuring his works and those of Alois Kalvoda. In 1920 his statue, "Pilgrims", was presented at the Salon in Paris, as an example of Czech art. During the 1920s, he often stayed in Slovakia, where he created decorations for the public buildings in Bratislava. His last major work was a monument to František Bohumír Zvěřina in Hrotovice.

In 1928, Uprka was stricken by appendicitis and rushed to the hospital for an emergency operation. After that, his health deteriorated. Following another stay in the hospital, he and Otilia went to Tuchoměřice to rest and recuperate. He died there, of a heart attack, on 26 January 1929, at the age of 61.

== Sources ==
- Jaroslav Kačer (Ed.): Franta Úprka: 1868–1929 (exhibition catalog), Galerie výtvarného umění v Hodoníně, 2008. ISBN 978-80-85015-52-2
- Monika Eretová: Sochař Franta Úprka a jeho sepulkrální tvorba, thesis, 2013, Univerzita Karlova v Praze
- František Hoplíček and Oldřich Koblížek (Eds.): Almanach Sdružení výtvarných umělců moravských v Hodoníně, Hodonín 1923.
- Franta Úprka 1868–1929. Posmrtná výstava sochařského díla jeho (exhibition catalog), Hodonín 1930.
- Jan Andrys and Ilona Tunklová (Eds.): Sladké s hořkým. Ze života umělecké družiny Domu umělců SVUM v Hodoníně, Hodonín 2007. ISBN 978-80-7326-112-2
