= Kněždub =

- Municipality
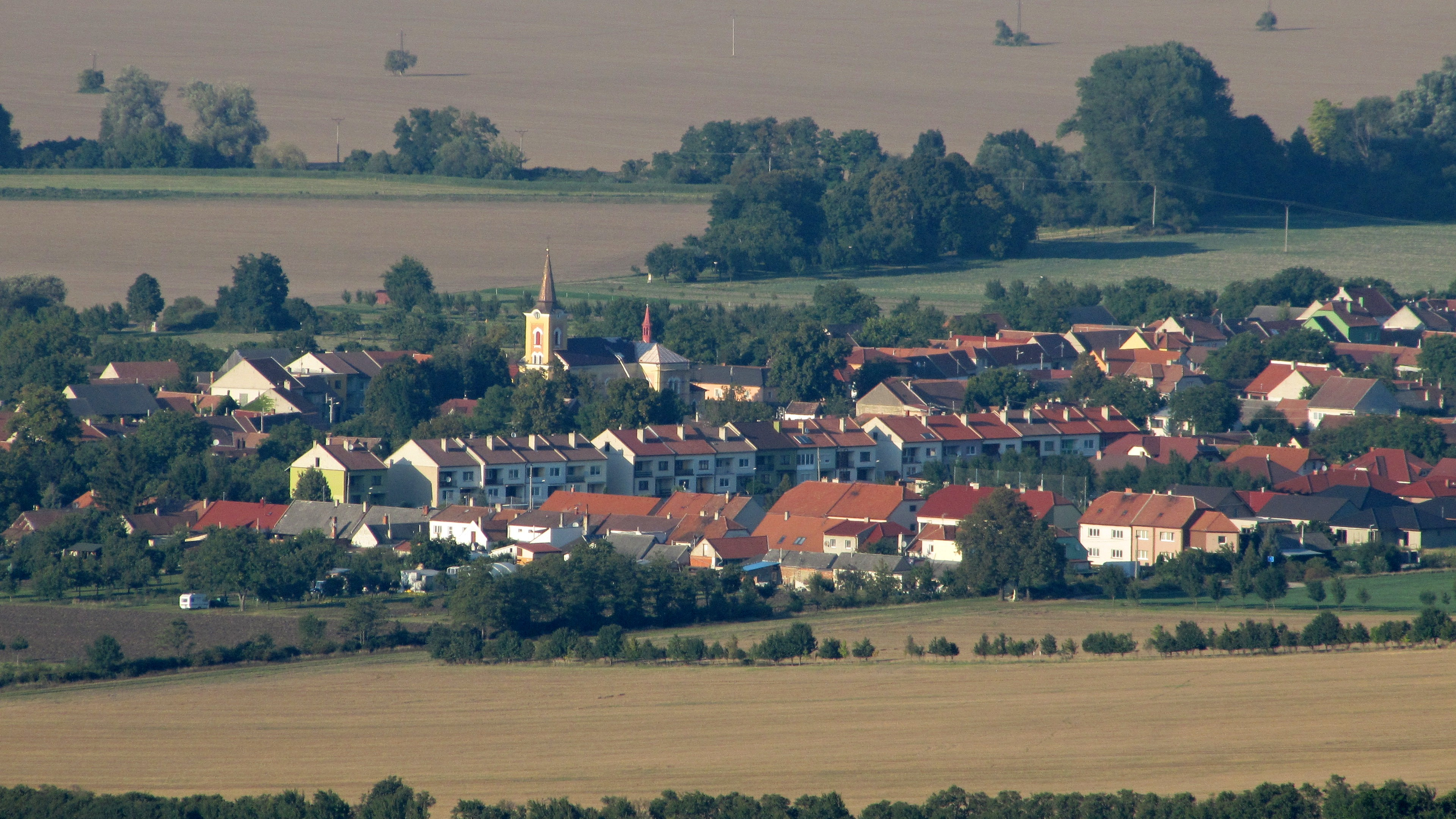
- General view

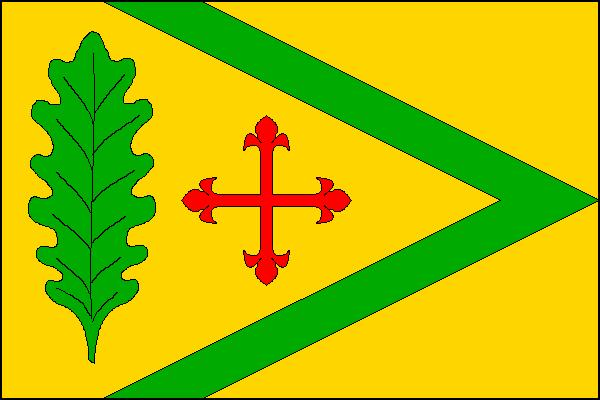
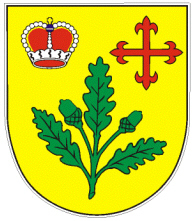
- Flag Coat of arms

- Location in the Czech Republic
- Coordinates: 48°53′12″N 17°23′44″E
- Country: Czech Republic
- Region: South Moravian
- District: Hodonín
- Founded: 1264

Area
  - Total: 16.09 km^{2} (6.21 sq mi)
- Elevation: 185 m (607 ft)

Population (2026-01-01)
  - Total: 1,044
  - Density: 64.89/km^{2} (168.1/sq mi)
- Time zone: UTC+1 (CET)
  - Summer (DST): UTC+2 (CEST)
- Postal code: 696 64
- Website: www.knezdub.cz

Kněždub is a municipality and village in Hodonín District in the South Moravian Region of the Czech Republic. It has about 1,000 inhabitants.

Kněždub lies approximately 20 kilometres (12 mi) east of Hodonín, 67 km (42 mi) south-east of Brno, and 254 km (158 mi) south-east of Prague.

== Demographics ==
Historical population
Year	Pop.	±%
1869	1,191	—
1880	1,288	+8.1%
1890	1,307	+1.5%
1900	1,352	+3.4%
1910	1,340	−0.9%
1921	1,314	−1.9%
1930	1,277	−2.8%
1950	1,205	−5.6%
1961	1,313	+9.0%
1970	1,283	−2.3%
1980	1,156	−9.9%
1991	1,114	−3.6%
2001	1,097	−1.5%
2011	1,113	+1.5%
2021	1,036	−6.9%
Source: Censuses

== Notable people ==
- Joža Uprka (1861–1940), painter
- František Uprka (1868–1929), sculptor
- Antoš Frolka (1877–1935), painter
