= Hroznová Lhota =

- Municipality
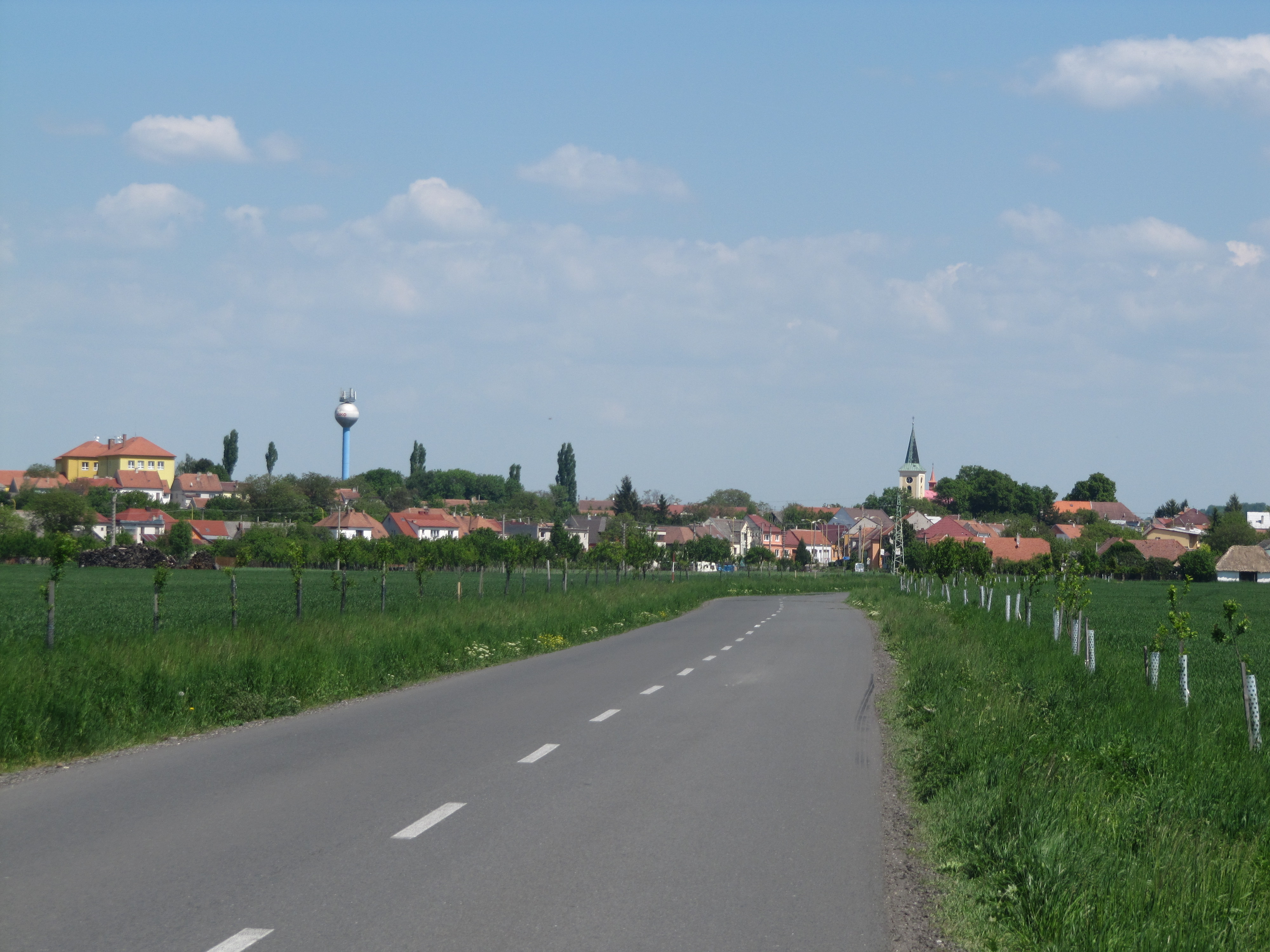
- View from the west

- Flag Coat of arms

- Location in the Czech Republic
- Coordinates: 48°54′28″N 17°25′1″E
- Country: Czech Republic
- Region: South Moravian
- District: Hodonín
- First mentioned: 1371

Area
  - Total: 9.05 km^{2} (3.49 sq mi)
- Elevation: 203 m (666 ft)

Population (2026-01-01)
  - Total: 1,153
  - Density: 127/km^{2} (330/sq mi)
- Time zone: UTC+1 (CET)
  - Summer (DST): UTC+2 (CEST)
- Postal code: 696 63
- Website: www.hroznovalhota.cz

Hroznová Lhota is a municipality and village in Hodonín District in the South Moravian Region of the Czech Republic. It has about 1,200 inhabitants.

== Etymology ==
Lhota is a common name of Czech villages. The municipality has a long vine-growing tradition, hence the name meaning "Grapes' Lhota", which has been in use since the late 16th century. Prior it the village was named just Lhota and Lhota Veselská.

== Geography ==
Hroznová Lhota is located about 22 kilometres (14 mi) east of Hodonín and 39 km (24 mi) southwest of Zlín. It lies in the Vizovice Highlands. The highest point is at 436 m (1,430 ft) above sea level. The Velička River flows through the municipality. The Bílé Karpaty Protected Landscape Area extends from the south just into the centre of the municipality.

== History ==
The first written mention of Hroznová Lhota is from 1371. Among the most notable owners of the village were the Liechtenstein family.

== Demographics ==
Historical population

| Year | Pop. | ±% |
|---|---|---|
| 1869 | 992 | — |
| 1880 | 1,027 | +3.5% |
| 1890 | 1,050 | +2.2% |
| 1900 | 1,098 | +4.6% |
| 1910 | 1,093 | −0.5% |

| Year | Pop. | ±% |
|---|---|---|
| 1921 | 1,147 | +4.9% |
| 1930 | 1,009 | −12.0% |
| 1950 | 1,067 | +5.7% |
| 1961 | 1,264 | +18.5% |
| 1970 | 1,268 | +0.3% |

| Year | Pop. | ±% |
|---|---|---|
| 1980 | 1,346 | +6.2% |
| 1991 | 1,306 | −3.0% |
| 2001 | 1,274 | −2.5% |
| 2011 | 1,225 | −3.8% |
| 2021 | 1,129 | −7.8% |

Source: Censuses

== Transport ==
There are no railways or major roads passing through the municipality.

== Sights ==
There are no protected cultural monuments in the municipality. The main landmark of Hroznová Lhota is the Church of Saint John the Baptist. It was built in 1654 and rebuilt to its present form in 1902.

== Notable people ==
- Joža Uprka (1861–1940), painter; lived and died here
