= Tuchoměřice =

- Municipality
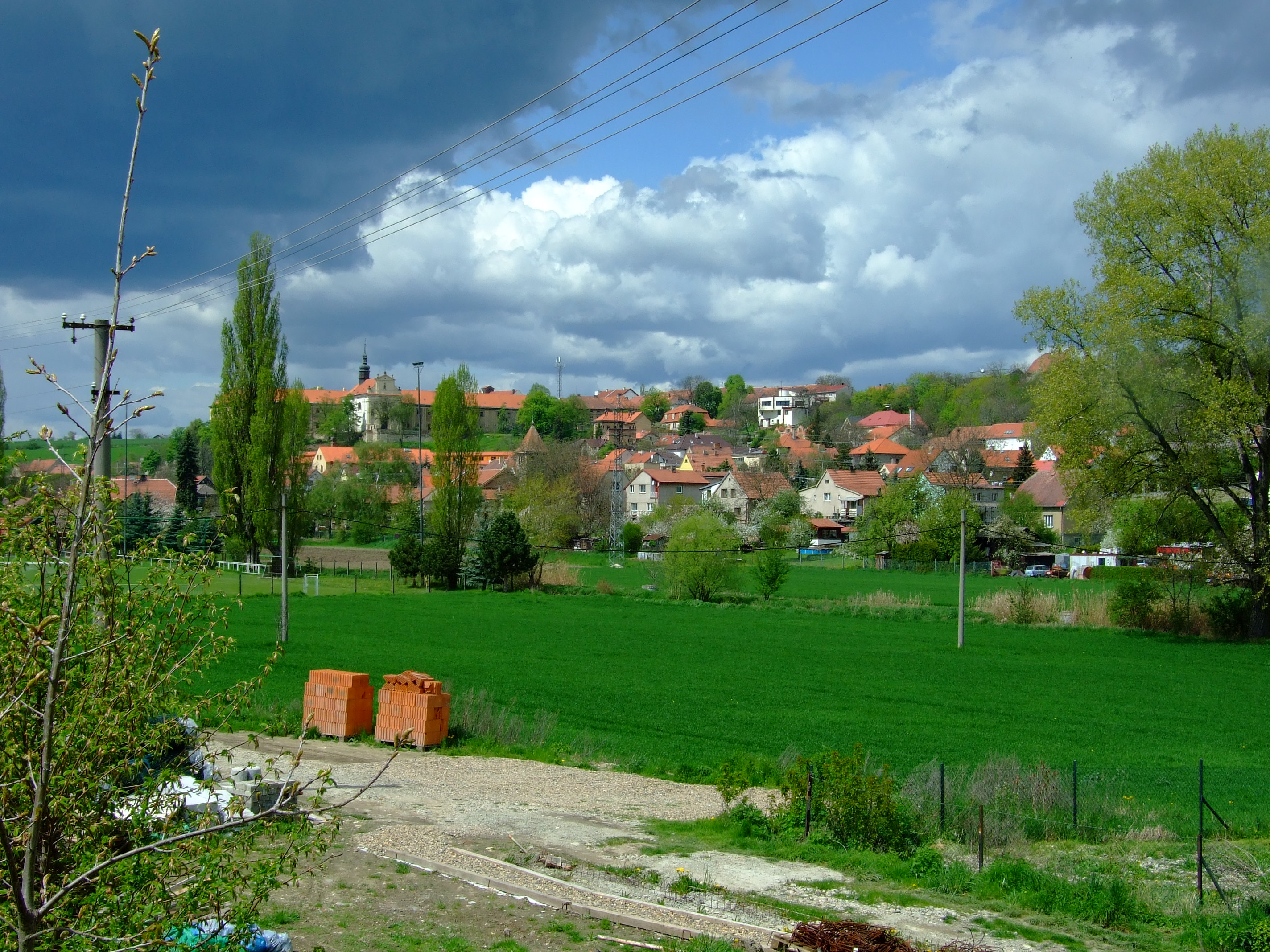
- View towards the village

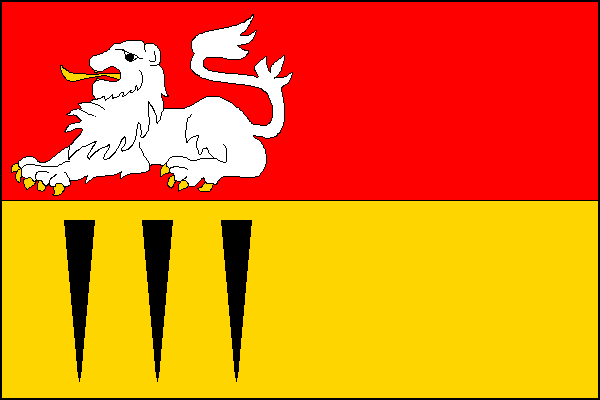
- Flag Coat of arms

- Location in the Czech Republic
- Coordinates: 50°8′8″N 14°16′56″E
- Country: Czech Republic
- Region: Central Bohemian
- District: Prague-West
- First mentioned: 1301

Area
  - Total: 8.87 km^{2} (3.42 sq mi)
- Elevation: 314 m (1,030 ft)

Population (2026-01-01)
  - Total: 1,718
  - Density: 194/km^{2} (502/sq mi)
- Time zone: UTC+1 (CET)
  - Summer (DST): UTC+2 (CEST)
- Postal code: 252 67
- Website: www.outuchomerice.cz

Tuchoměřice is a municipality and village in Prague-West District in the Central Bohemian Region of the Czech Republic. It has about 1,700 inhabitants.

== Demographics ==
Historical population
Year	Pop.	±%
1869	911	—
1880	1,002	+10.0%
1890	1,053	+5.1%
1900	1,161	+10.3%
1910	1,166	+0.4%
1921	1,091	−6.4%
1930	1,255	+15.0%
1950	1,142	−9.0%
1961	1,138	−0.4%
1970	1,044	−8.3%
1980	1,023	−2.0%
1991	930	−9.1%
2001	997	+7.2%
2011	1,459	+46.3%
2021	1,742	+19.4%
Source: Censuses

== Notable people ==
- František Uprka (1868–1929), sculptor; died here
