= Ronov nad Doubravou =

- Town
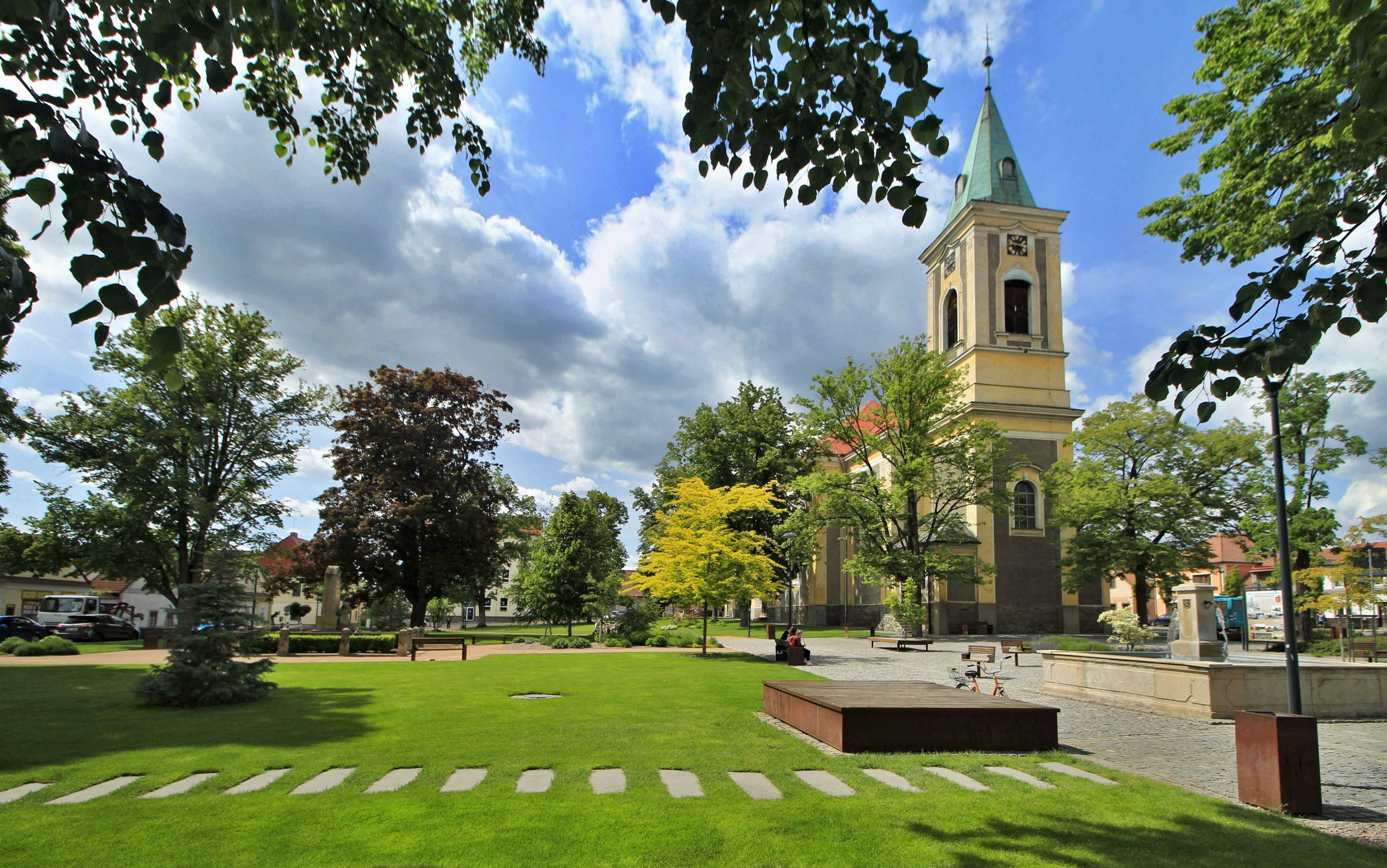
- Chittussiho Square with the Church of Saint Lawrence

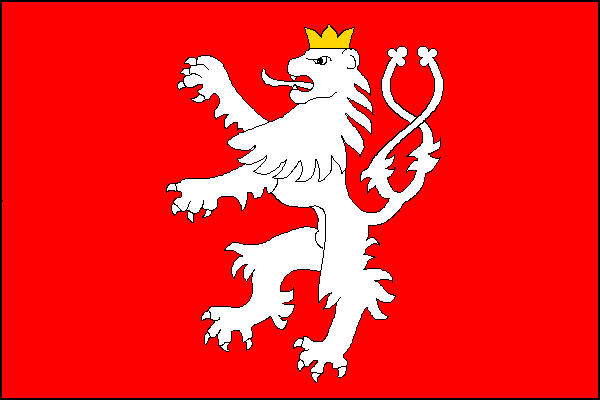
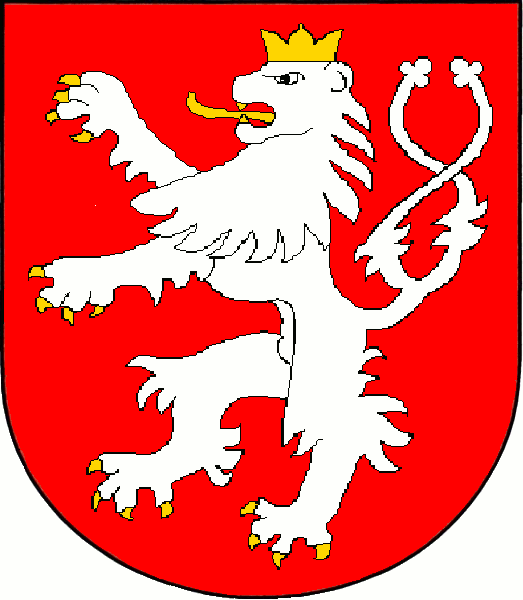
- Flag Coat of arms

- Location in the Czech Republic
- Coordinates: 49°53′18″N 15°31′53″E
- Country: Czech Republic
- Region: Pardubice
- District: Chrudim
- Founded: 1307

Government
  - Mayor: Marcel Lesák

Area
  - Total: 17.01 km^{2} (6.57 sq mi)
- Elevation: 255 m (837 ft)

Population (2026-01-01)
  - Total: 1,677
  - Density: 98.59/km^{2} (255.3/sq mi)
- Time zone: UTC+1 (CET)
  - Summer (DST): UTC+2 (CEST)
- Postal codes: 538 42, 538 43
- Website: www.ronovnd.cz

Ronov nad Doubravou (Czech pronunciation: [ˈronof ˈnad doubravou]) is a town in Chrudim District in the Pardubice Region of the Czech Republic. It has about 1,700 inhabitants.

== Administrative division ==
Ronov nad Doubravou consists of three municipal parts (in brackets population according to the 2021 census):

- Ronov nad Doubravou (1,435)
- Mladotice (127)
- Moravany (69)

== Etymology ==
The name Ronov is derived from the Middle High German word rone, ron. It was a term for a lopped tree trunk with short branch stubs. This was an element on the coat of arms of the Lichtemburk family, who founded the town.

== Geography ==
Ronov nad Doubravou is located about 20 kilometres (12 mi) southwest of Chrudim and 23 km (14 mi) southwest of Pardubice. It lies mostly in the Central Elbe Table, only the southern part of the municipal territory with the Moravany village lies in the Upper Sázava Hills. The highest point is at 345 metres (1,132 ft) above sea level. The Doubrava River flows through the town.

== History ==
Ronov nad Doubravou was founded by Oldřich of Lichtemburk in 1307 and was already referred to as a town. In the 16th century, the town obtained various guild privileges. Ronov nad Doubravou never had town walls and did not develop significantly. After losing the title of town, it was promoted to a market town in 1908 and then again to a town in 1909. In 1945, the municipality ceased to be a town, but in 1998 the title of town was returned to it.

== Demographics ==
Historical population

Year	Pop.	±%
1869	2,361	—
1880	2,474	+4.8%
1890	2,311	−6.6%
1900	2,267	−1.9%
1910	2,168	−4.4%

Year	Pop.	±%
1921	2,070	−4.5%
1930	2,068	−0.1%
1950	1,721	−16.8%
1961	1,732	+0.6%
1970	1,650	−4.7%

Year	Pop.	±%
1980	1,703	+3.2%
1991	1,628	−4.4%
2001	1,588	−2.5%
2011	1,683	+6.0%
2021	1,631	−3.1%

Source: Censuses

== Transport ==
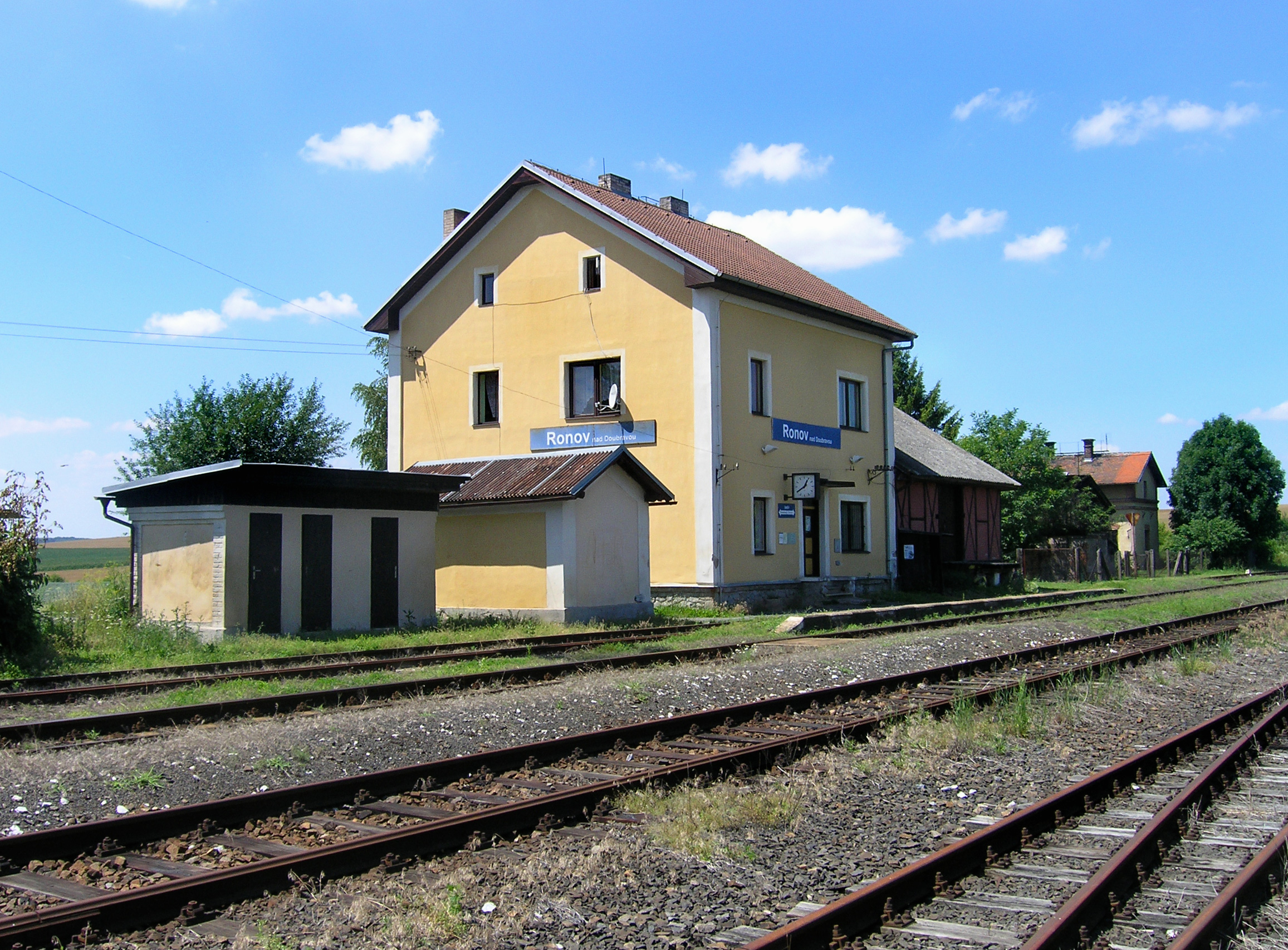
Train station

Ronov nad Doubravou is located on the railway line Čáslav–Třemošnice.

== Sights ==
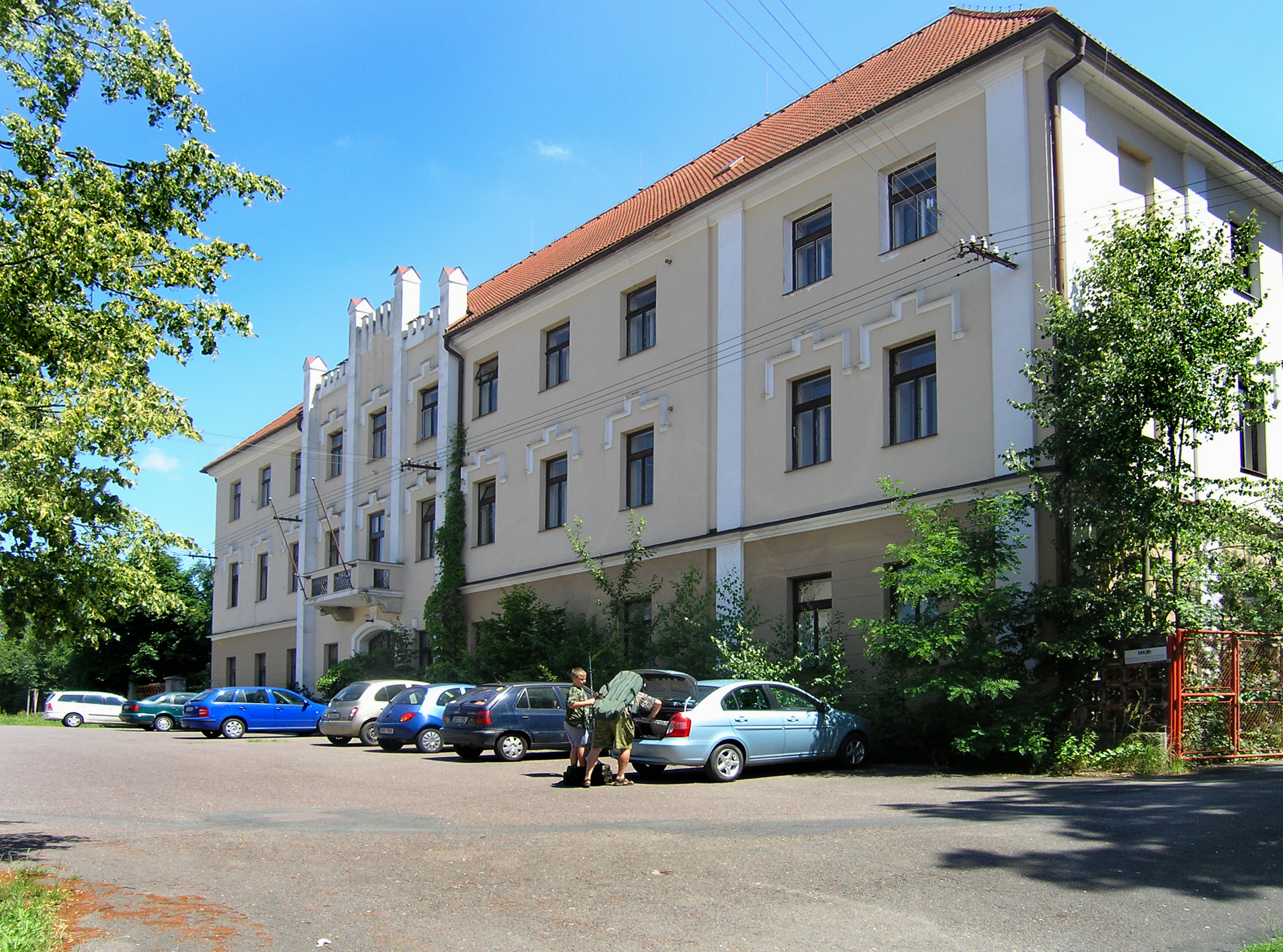
Ronov nad Doubravou Castle

A significant landmark is the Church of Saint Lawrence. It was built in the neo-Baroque style in 1849–1852, probably on the site of an older Gothic church.

The castle in Ronov nad Doubravou is a Baroque building with a Neoclassical modifications. Today it is privately owned and inaccessible.

== Notable people ==
- Antonín Chittussi (1847–1891), painter
