= Josef Drahoňovský =

Czech sculptor (1877–1938)

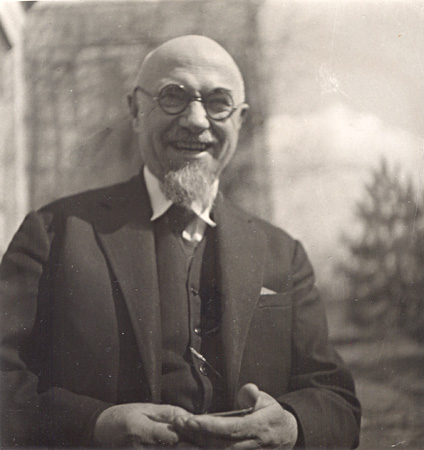
- Born: 27 March 1877; Turnov, Austria-Hungary
- Died: 20 July 1938 (aged 61); Prague, Czechoslovakia
- Occupation: Sculptor

Josef Drahoňovský (27 March 1877 – 20 July 1938) was a Czech sculptor. His work was part of the sculpture event in the art competition at the 1932 Summer Olympics, where he represented Czechoslovakia.
