= Alois Kalvoda =

Czech landscape painter

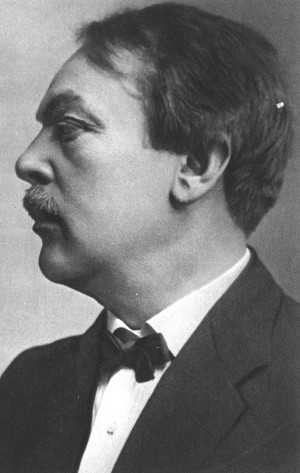
Alois Kalvoda

Alois Kalvoda (15 May 1875 – 25 June 1934) was a Czech landscape painter.

== Biography ==
Kalvoda was born in Šlapanice near Brno, the eighth of ten children. He attended the gymnasium in Brno and then studied at the Academy of Fine Arts in Prague for five years, 1892–1897, with Julius Mařák. In 1900 a scholarship allowed him to study in Paris, from where he moved to Munich in 1901. His time in Munich is credited with broadening his experience of contemporary trends. He first exhibited in Prague in 1901, and in 1902 exhibited at the Mánes Union of Fine Arts.

He opened an art school in Prague in 1900, where his students included Josef Váchal. He moved this school in 1917 to a castle he had purchased in Běhařov.

In 1907, he was one of the founding members of the Association of Moravian Artists.

He was married first to Anna Fastrová (1905–1929) and then to Božena Peloušková (from 1933).

== Paintings ==
Kalvoda's paintings focused on Czech landscapes. His style was initially marked by Mařák, then by naturalism, with an inclination towards Art Nouveau symbolism. From 1907 his painting became increasingly impressionist.

He received some twenty separate domestic exhibitions and was also exhibited in Vienna, Berlin, Warsaw, Rome, Paris, Saint Louis, and Pittsburgh. His 1936 posthumous exhibition in Prague consisted of 110 works.

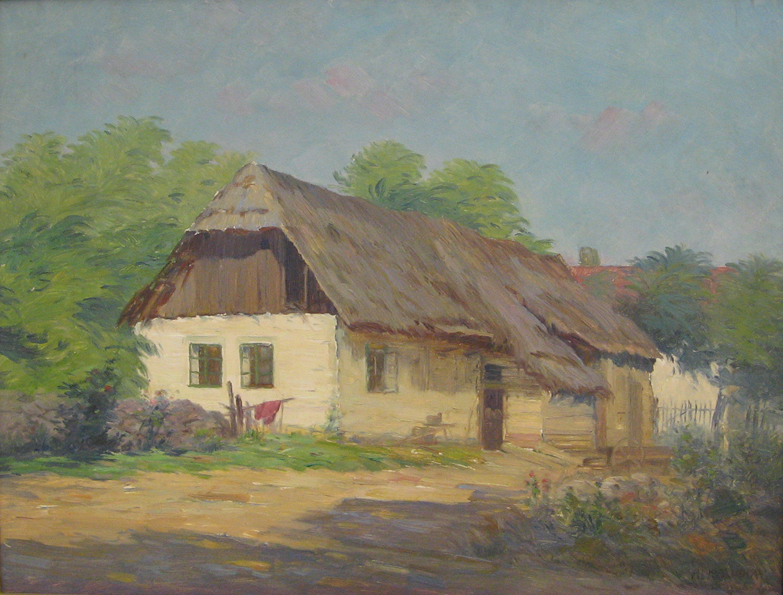
Cottage

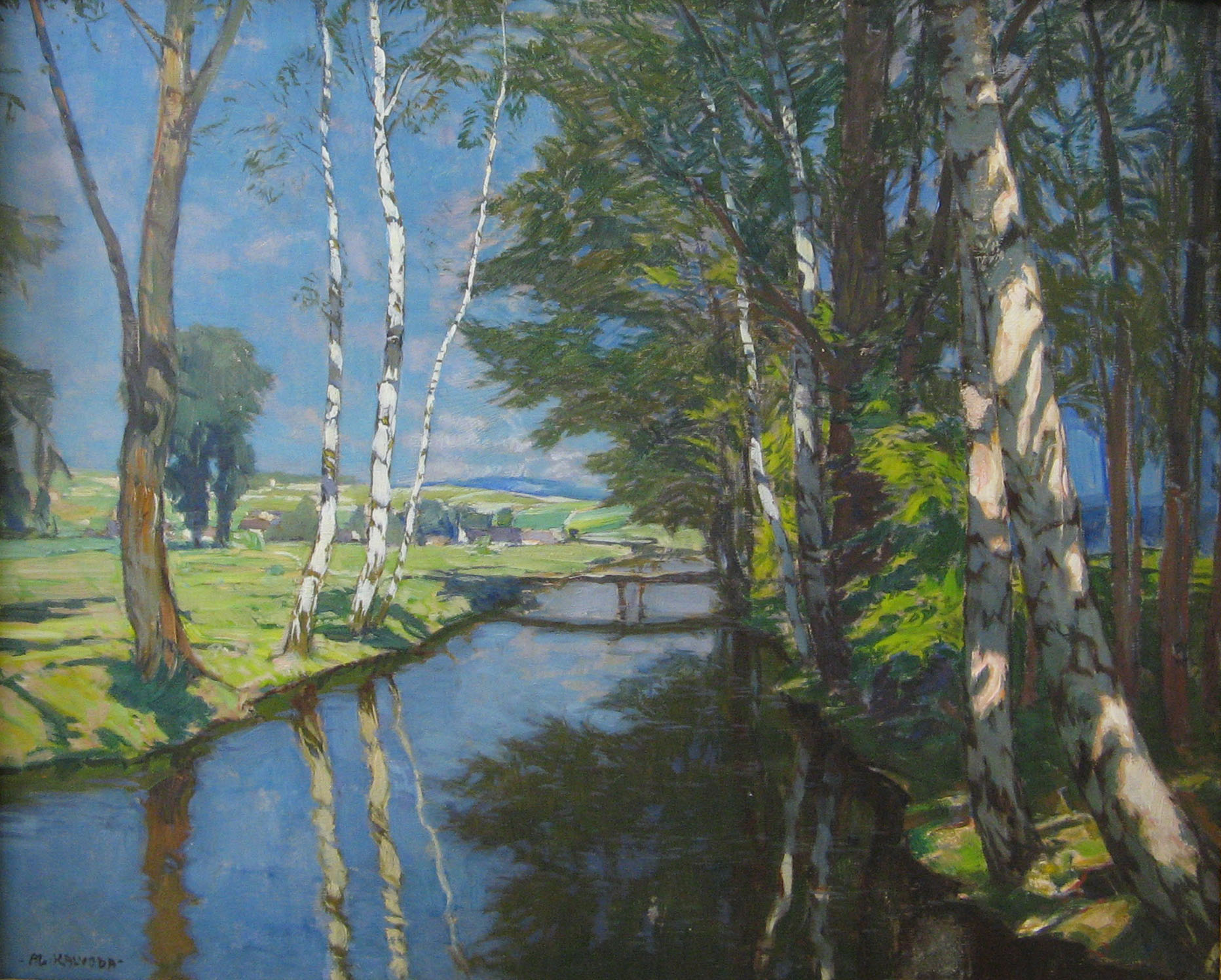
Birches

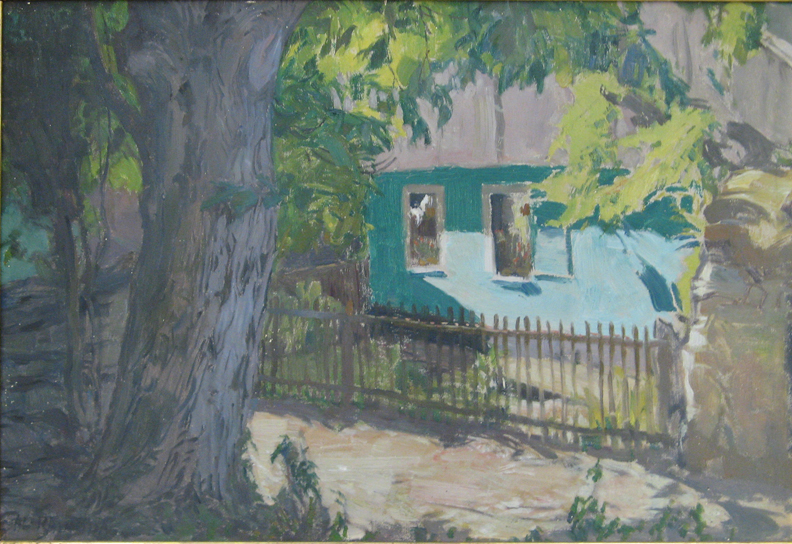
Cottages

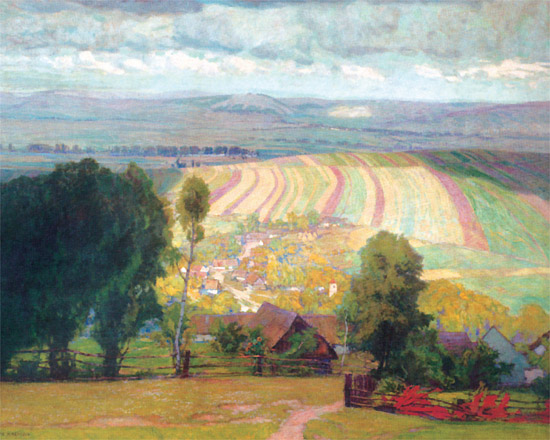
View of St.Anthony

Village (Vesnicka)

== Subsequent appreciation ==
A memorial to Kalvoda was unveiled in the Šlapanice cemetery in 1998. In 2005, the Czech Republic honored him with a postage stamp showing his "Osiky by Velké Němčice," one of his earliest paintings, then exhibited at the Moravian Gallery in Brno.
