= Člunek =

- Municipality
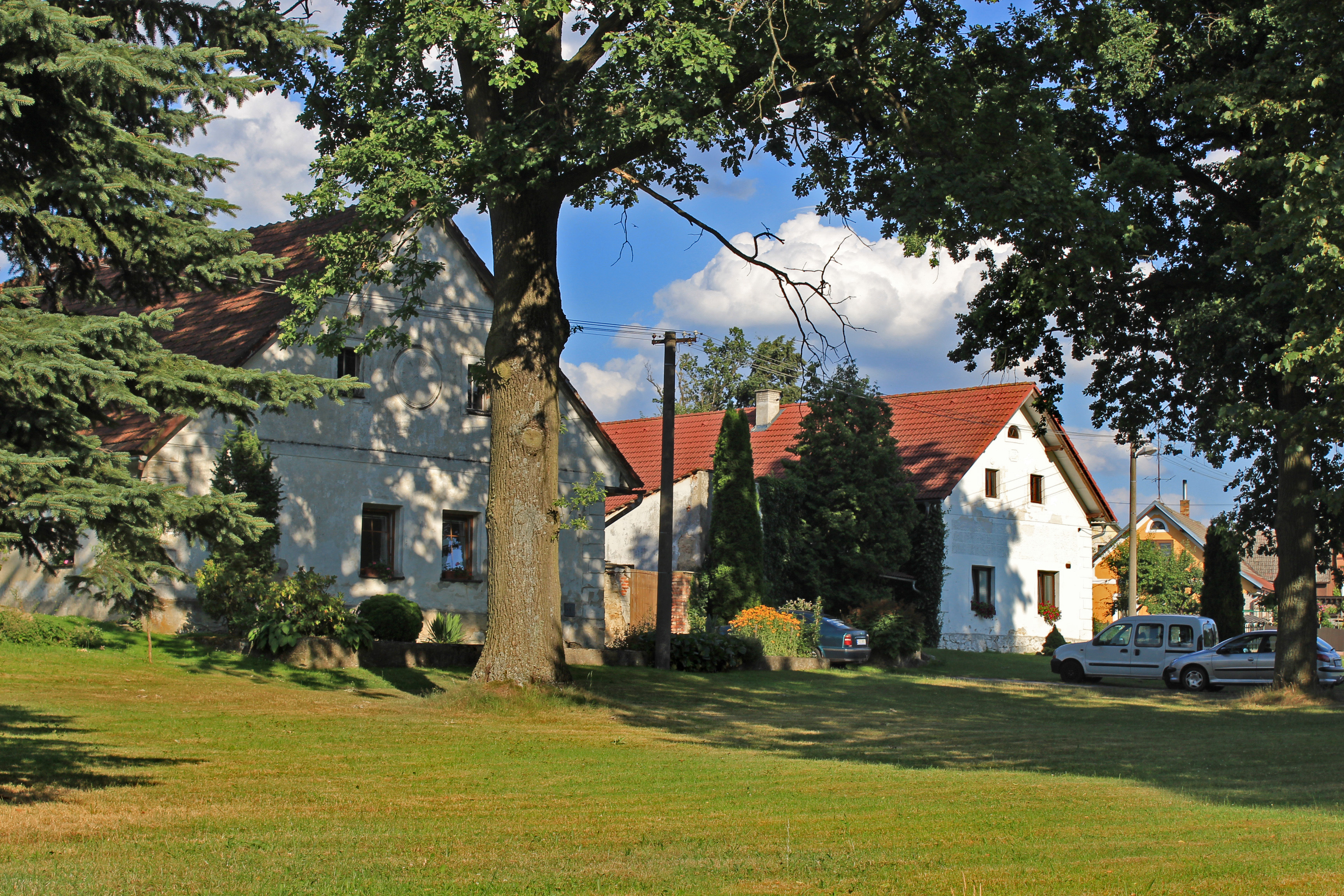
- Centre of Člunek

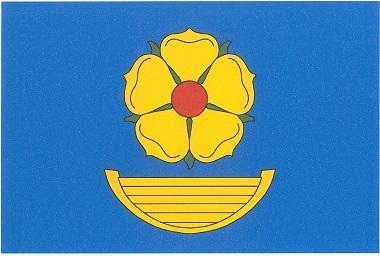
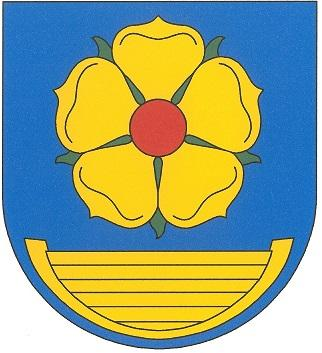
- Flag Coat of arms

- Location in the Czech Republic
- Coordinates: 49°6′41″N 15°7′36″E
- Country: Czech Republic
- Region: South Bohemian
- District: Jindřichův Hradec
- First mentioned: 1542

Area
  - Total: 24.95 km^{2} (9.63 sq mi)
- Elevation: 544 m (1,785 ft)

Population (2026-01-01)
  - Total: 486
  - Density: 19.5/km^{2} (50.5/sq mi)
- Time zone: UTC+1 (CET)
  - Summer (DST): UTC+2 (CEST)
- Postal codes: 378 33, 378 53, 378 61
- Website: www.clunek.cz

Člunek is a municipality and village in Jindřichův Hradec District in the South Bohemian Region of the Czech Republic. It has about 500 inhabitants.

Člunek lies approximately 11 kilometres (7 mi) south-east of Jindřichův Hradec, 51 km (32 mi) east of České Budějovice, and 120 km (75 mi) south-east of Prague.

== Administrative division ==
Člunek consists of three municipal parts (in brackets population according to the 2021 census):

- Člunek (242)
- Kunějov (75)
- Lomy (155)

== Demographics ==
Historical population
Year	Pop.	±%
1869	1,917	—
1880	1,852	−3.4%
1890	1,672	−9.7%
1900	1,641	−1.9%
1910	1,489	−9.3%
1921	1,334	−10.4%
1930	1,266	−5.1%
1950	643	−49.2%
1961	580	−9.8%
1970	500	−13.8%
1980	455	−9.0%
1991	441	−3.1%
2001	457	+3.6%
2011	471	+3.1%
2021	472	+0.2%
Source: Censuses
