= Hrotovice =

- Town
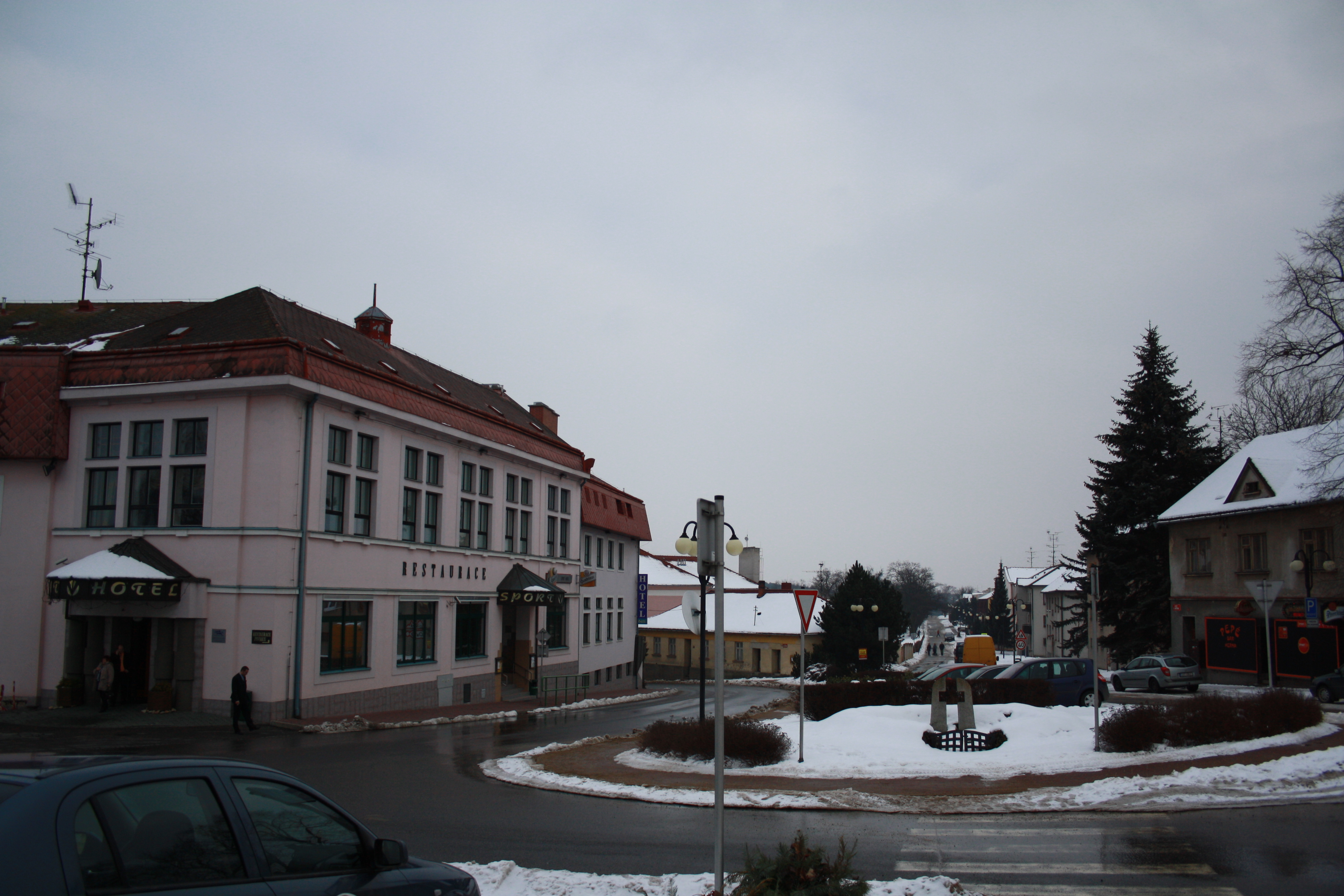
- The square Náměstí 8. května

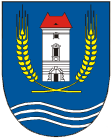
- Flag Coat of arms

- Location in the Czech Republic
- Coordinates: 49°6′28″N 16°3′38″E
- Country: Czech Republic
- Region: Vysočina
- District: Třebíč
- First mentioned: 1228

Government
  - Mayor: Hana Škodová

Area
  - Total: 20.92 km^{2} (8.08 sq mi)
- Elevation: 417 m (1,368 ft)

Population (2026-01-01)
  - Total: 1,779
  - Density: 85.04/km^{2} (220.2/sq mi)
- Time zone: UTC+1 (CET)
  - Summer (DST): UTC+2 (CEST)
- Postal code: 675 55
- Website: www.hrotovice.cz

Hrotovice (Czech pronunciation: [ˈɦrotovɪtsɛ]) is a town in Třebíč District in the Vysočina Region of the Czech Republic. It has about 1,800 inhabitants.

== Etymology ==
The village was named after Dětřich Theodoricus Hrut, who was its probable founder.

== Geography ==
Hrotovice is located about 17 kilometres (11 mi) southeast of Třebíč and 38 km (24 mi) west of Brno. It lies in the Jevišovice Uplands. The highest point is at 447 m (1,467 ft) above sea level. The Rouchovanka Stream flows through the municipal territory.

== History ==
The first written mention of Hrotovice is in a deed of King Ottokar I from 1228. The owners were various lesser noble families and changed frequently. For the longest time, Hrotovice was the property of the Osovský of Doubravice family, who owned it from 1420 until the end of the 16th century.

== Demographics ==
Historical population

Year	Pop.	±%
1869	962	—
1880	1,052	+9.4%
1890	1,192	+13.3%
1900	1,239	+3.9%
1910	1,333	+7.6%

Year	Pop.	±%
1921	1,429	+7.2%
1930	1,500	+5.0%
1950	1,332	−11.2%
1961	1,430	+7.4%
1970	1,398	−2.2%

Year	Pop.	±%
1980	1,532	+9.6%
1991	1,581	+3.2%
2001	1,796	+13.6%
2011	1,720	−4.2%
2021	1,729	+0.5%

Source: Censuses

== Transport ==
There are no railways or major roads passing through the municipality.

== Sights ==
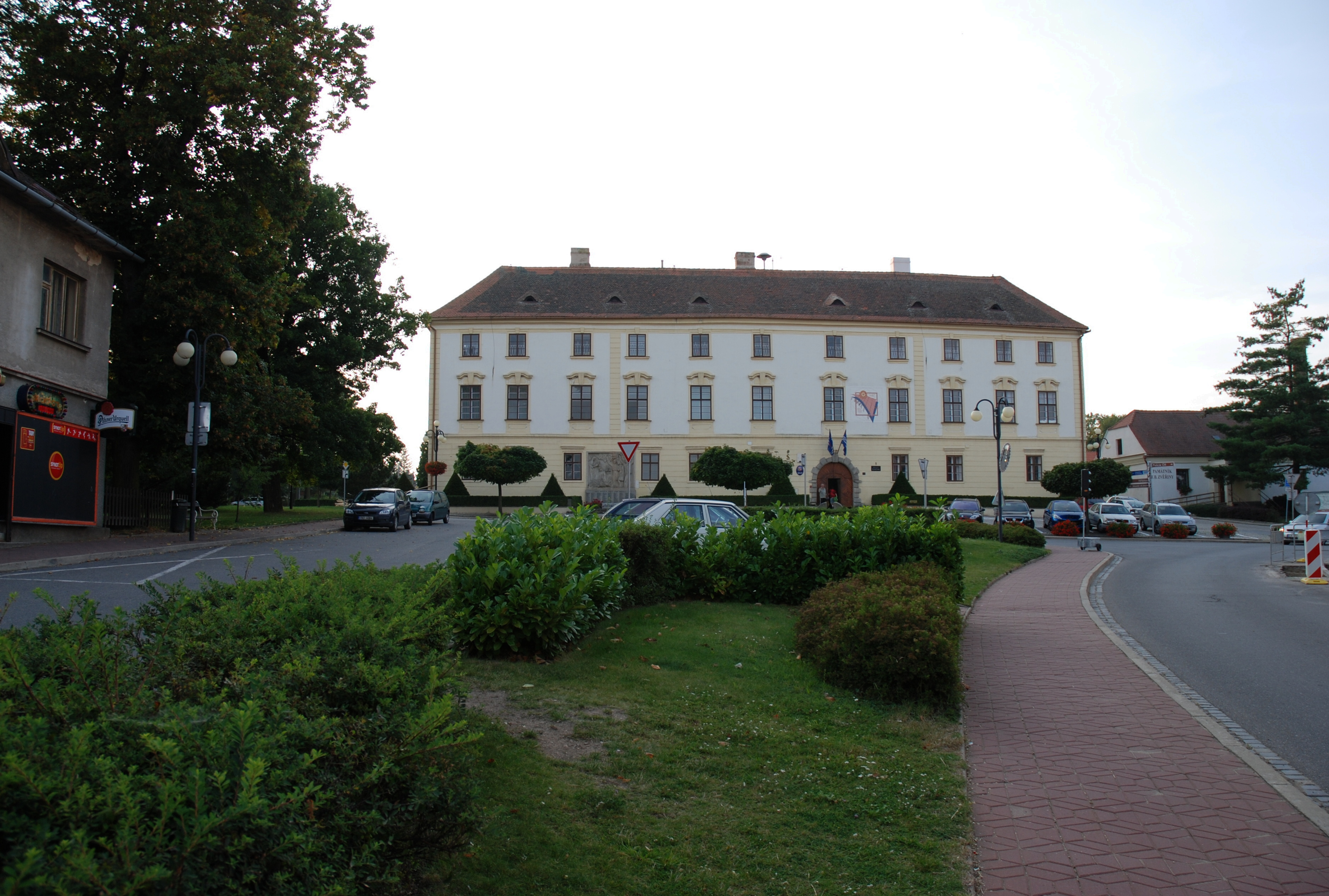
Town square with the castle

The main landmark of the town square is the castle. It was a Renaissance castle on medieval foundations, rebuilt in the current Baroque form. Today, the town hall is located here.

An important monument is the Church of Saint Lawrence. It is a late Romanesque building with Baroque modifications.

The former village of Mstěnice is an archaeologically important location. The existence of the village was first documented in 1393. The village was abolished in 1468. The foundations of the homesteads have been well preserved.

== Notable people ==
- František Bohumír Zvěřina (1835–1908), painter
