= František Bohumír Zvěřina =

Czech painter (1835–1908)

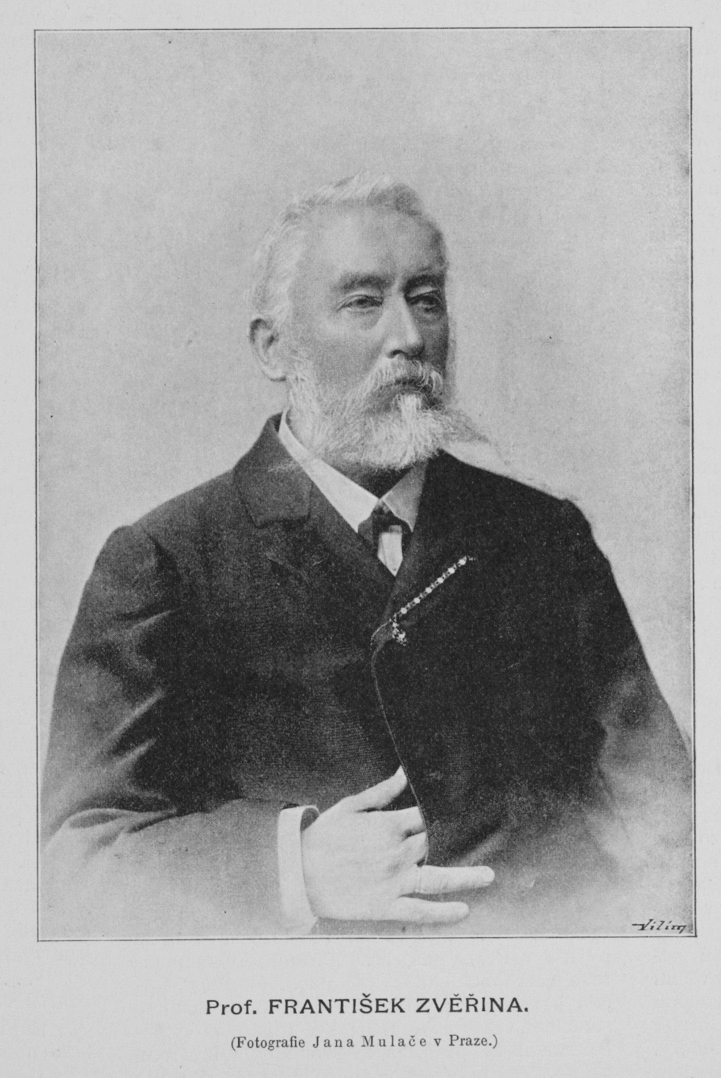
František Zvěřina (photograph by Jan Mulač, 1897)

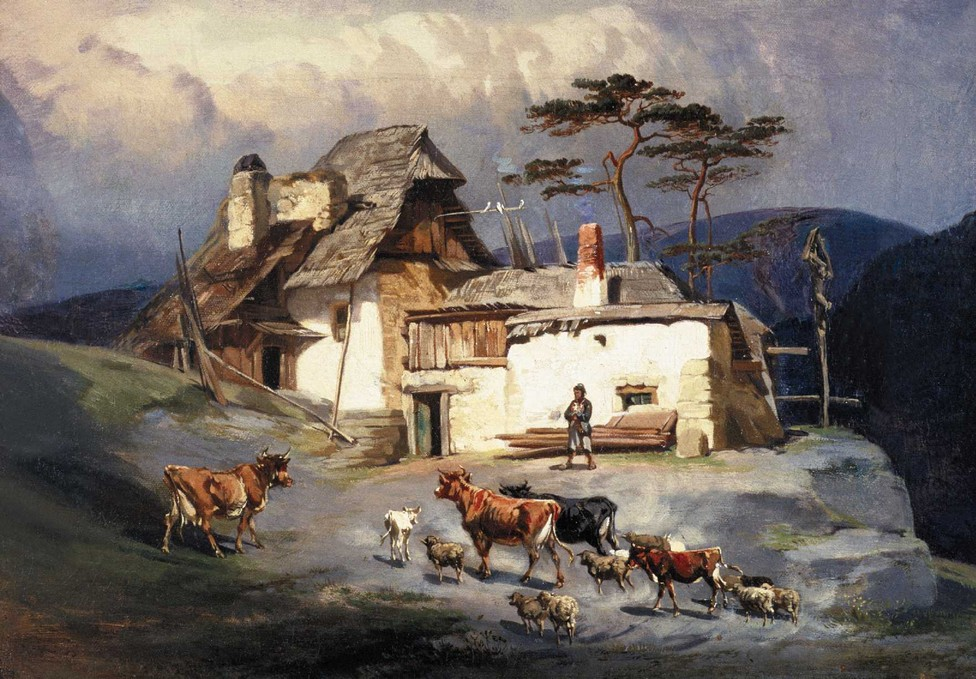
Rural cottage

František Bohumír Zvěřina (4 February 1835 – 27 December 1908) was a Czech painter.

== Life ==
Zvěřina was born in Hrotovice. The tenth of twelve children, he spent his young childhood in his native Hrotovice and 1845 went to Znojmo for secondary school. In 1849 he moved to a higher secondary school in Prague. After graduation, he joined the Max Haushofer school in 1852. Already after two years of study his paintings were exhibited.

He accepted a position teaching drawing in a higher secondary school in Kutná Hora, where on July 15, 1863, he married Jindřiška Janečková. After two years in Gorizia and five years in Maribor, moved to Brno in 1871 and finally from 1876 he lived continuously until his death in Vienna, where he taught art at a high school. Zvěřina died after a severe illness on 27 December 1908 in Vienna, Austria, and was buried in the Central Cemetery.

== Style ==
Zvěřina was usually classed as the Romanticism style of art. The topics of his artwork drew mainly from his places of residence in Maribor, Gorizia, Old Herzegovina and Montenegro. His drawings were published in a number of illustrated magazines of the time, published domestically and abroad. During his life he held many exhibitions in Prague, Brno Budapest, Vienna, Kraków, and elsewhere. He was also employed to create paintings and drawings for churches in the Moravian region including the Church of St. Margaret's in Jaroměřice nad Rokytnou and the Jewish synagogue in Třebíč and also carried out restoration work on existing church pictures.

== See also ==
- List of Czech painters
