= Élémir Bourges =

French novelist (1852–1925)

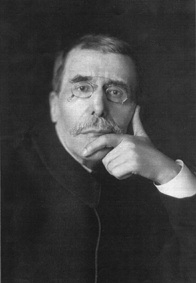
- Born: 26 March 1852; Manosque, France
- Died: 13 November 1925 (aged 73)

Élémir Bourges (French pronunciation: [elemiʁ buʁʒ]; 26 March 1852, Manosque, Alpes-de-Haute-Provence – 13 November 1925) was a French novelist. A winner of the Goncourt Prize, he was also a member of the Académie Goncourt. Bourges, who accused the Naturalists of having "belittled and deformed man", was closely linked with the Decadent and Symbolist modes in literature. His works, which include the 1884 novel Le Crépuscule des dieux ("the Twilight of the Gods"), were informed by both Richard Wagner and the Elizabethan dramatists.

== Bibliography ==
- Sous la hache (1883)
- Le Crépuscule des dieux (1884)
- Les oiseaux s’envolent et les fleurs tombent (1893)
- L'Enfant qui revient (1905)
- La Nef (1904–1922)
