= Joža Uprka =

Czech painter and graphic artist (1861–1940)

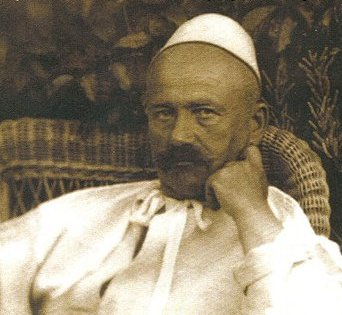
Joža Uprka (before 1920)

Joža Uprka (26 October 1861, Kněždub – 12 January 1940, Hroznová Lhota) was a Czech painter and graphic artist whose work combines elements of Impressionism and Art Nouveau to document the folklife of Southern Moravia.

== Biography ==
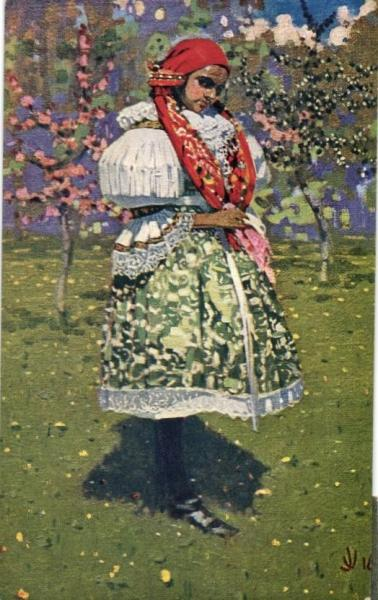
Scarves

Uprka was born to a peasant family. His father was an amateur painter, which inspired Joža and his brother, František, to pursue careers in art. After completing his primary education, he enrolled at the Academy of Fine Arts, Prague, where he studied with František Čermák. After Čermák's death, he transferred to the Academy of Fine Arts, Munich, where he was one of the founders of a Czech student organization called "Škréta" (after Karel Škréta), a group that included Alfons Mucha, Antonín Slavíček, Pavol Socháň and Luděk Marold.

In 1888, Uprka returned home and began painting scenes from peasant life. He studied in Paris from 1892 to 1893 thanks to a scholarship. In 1894, with Mucha's assistance, Uprka gave a showing at the Salon. His first major exhibition in Prague came in 1897.

Uprka was married in 1899, after which he bought a small house in Hroznová Lhota, which he used as a studio. In 1904, it was transformed into a two-story villa, inspired by folk architecture, with a design by Dušan Jurkovič. It soon became a popular meeting place for many notable Czech artists, writers and composers. However, the following year, his wife's mental condition, which was always poor, took a turn for the worse and it was necessary to place her in the mental hospital at Kroměříž. She stayed there until her death in 1959.

After this time, Uprka largely turned away from painting to do etchings. From 1922 to 1937, he lived in a castle in Ilava and maintained a studio in the Slovakian countryside, where he went for inspiration. In 1928, Uprka visited Dubrovnik, where he observed the local customs. His folk paintings received a major showing in Uherské Hradiště at the "Výstava Slovácka 1937". He died of kidney failure three years later and returned to his place of birth for burial.

Joža Uprka's motto he wrote about his own work:

I have worked my entire life not for fame and recognition, not for money and other benefits, not to humiliate others, but for the cause itself, so that as a conscious member of this tribe, I could capture as much of its life as possible.

== Selected paintings ==
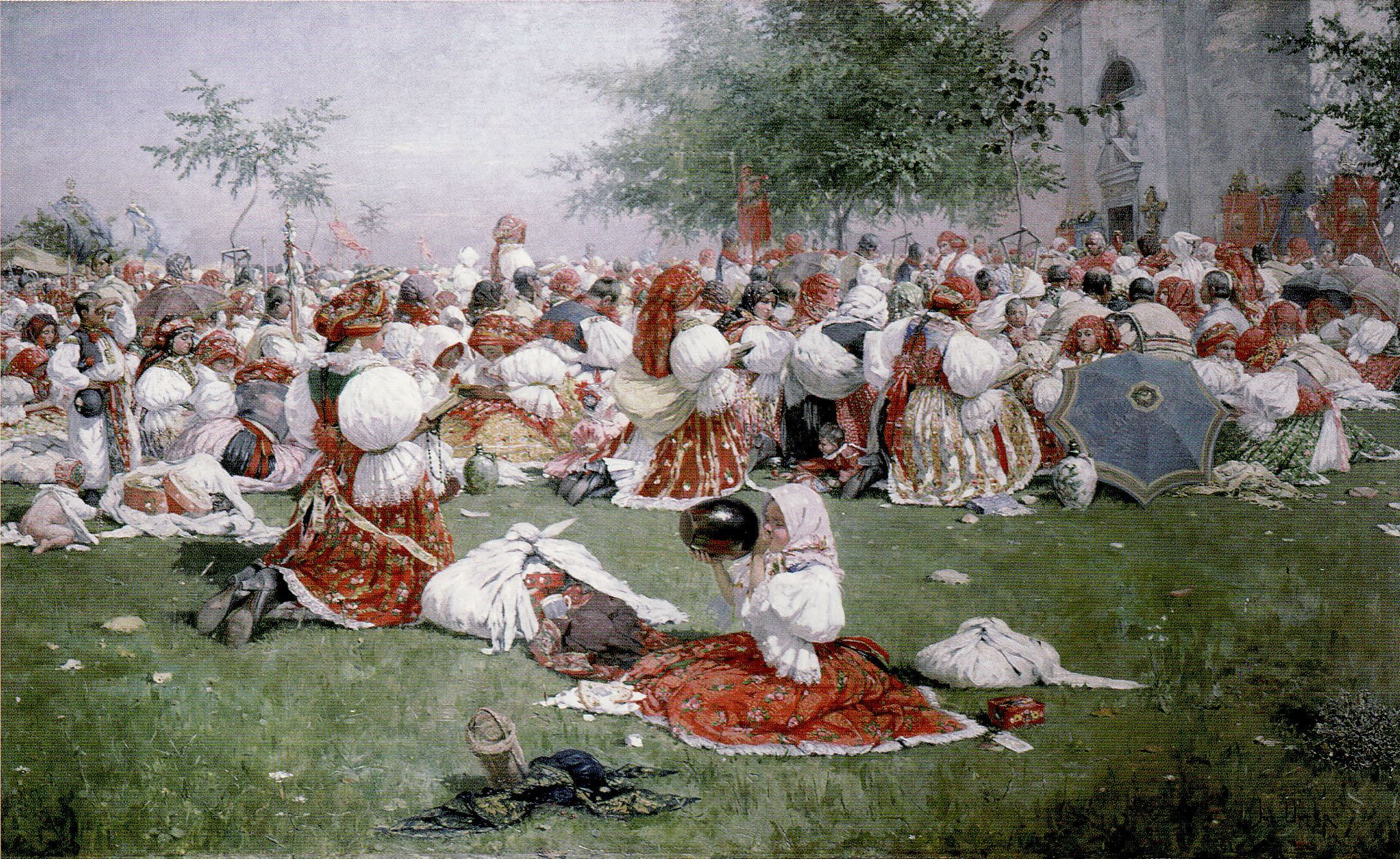
Pilgrimage to the chapel of Saint Anthony
above Blatnice

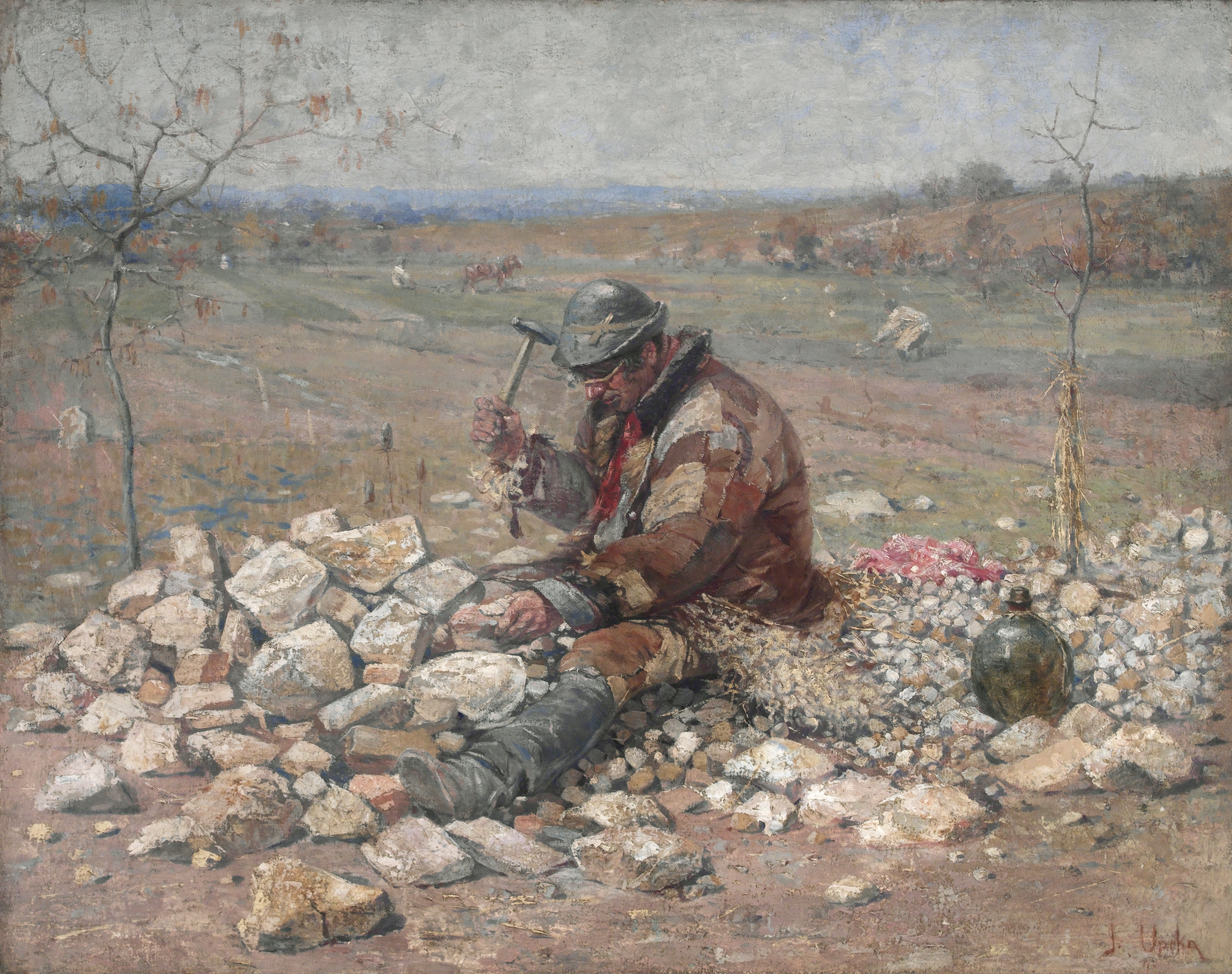
The Stonebreaker

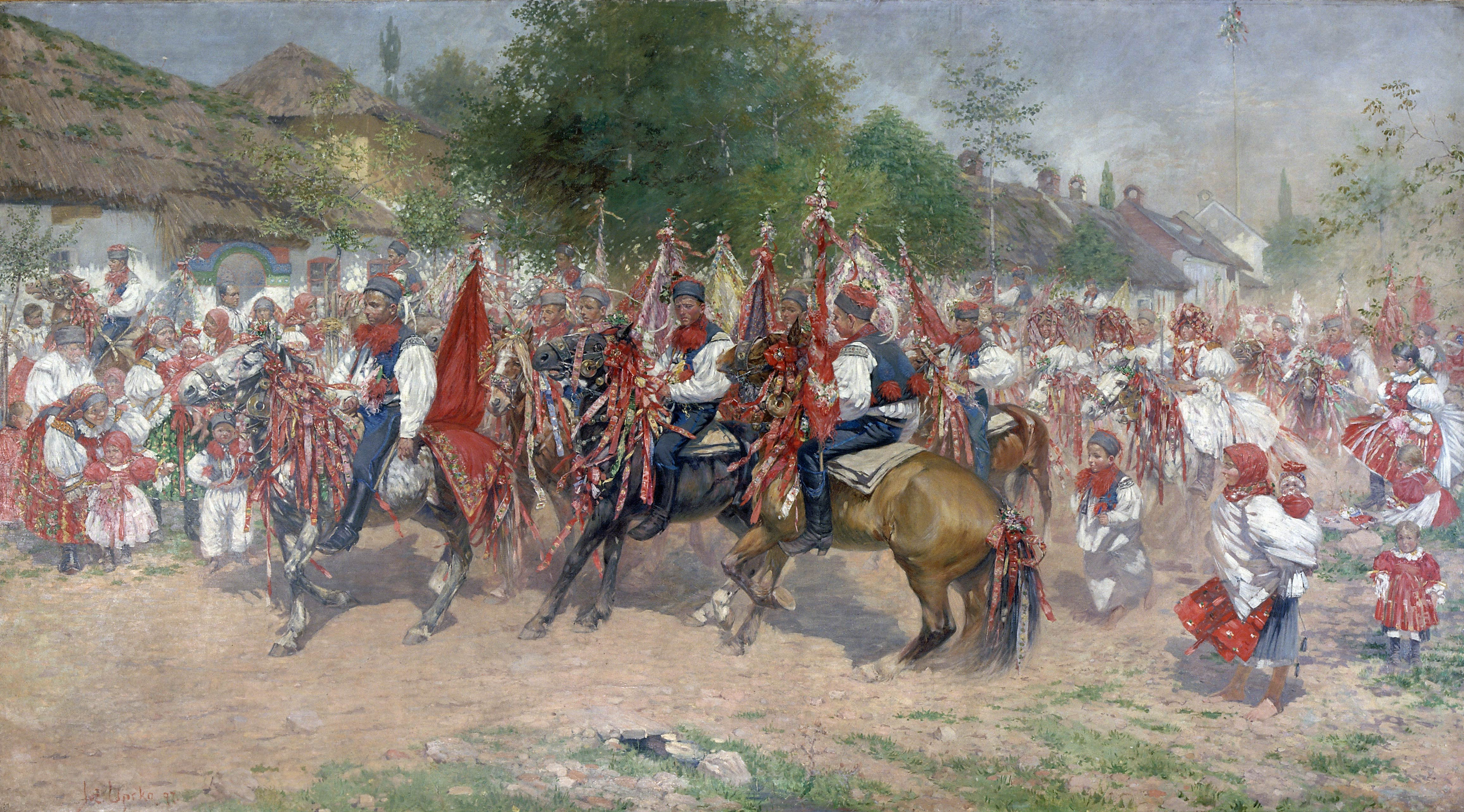
Ride of the Kings
