= Stříbrnice =

Stříbrnice may refer to places in the Czech Republic:

- Stříbrnice (Přerov District), a municipality and village in the Olomouc Region
- Stříbrnice (Uherské Hradiště District), a municipality and village in the Zlín Region
- Stříbrnice, a village and part of Staré Město (Šumperk District) in the Olomouc Region
- Stříbrnice, a village and part of Vrbice (Jičín District) in the Hradec Králové Region
