= Medlovice =

Medlovice may refer to places in the Czech Republic:

- Medlovice (Uherské Hradiště District), a municipality and village in the Zlín Region
- Medlovice (Vyškov District), a municipality and village in the South Moravian Region
