= Vápenice =

Vápenice may refer to places in the Czech Republic:

- Vápenice (Uherské Hradiště District), a municipality and village in the Zlín Region
- Vápenice, a village and part of Obory in the Central Bohemian Region
- Vápenice, a village and part of Vysoký Chlumec in the Central Bohemian Region
