= Částkov =

Částkov may refer to places in the Czech Republic:

- Částkov (Tachov District), a municipality and village in the Plzeň Region
- Částkov (Uherské Hradiště District), a municipality and village in the Zlín Region

== See also ==
- Častkov
