= Komňa =

- Municipality
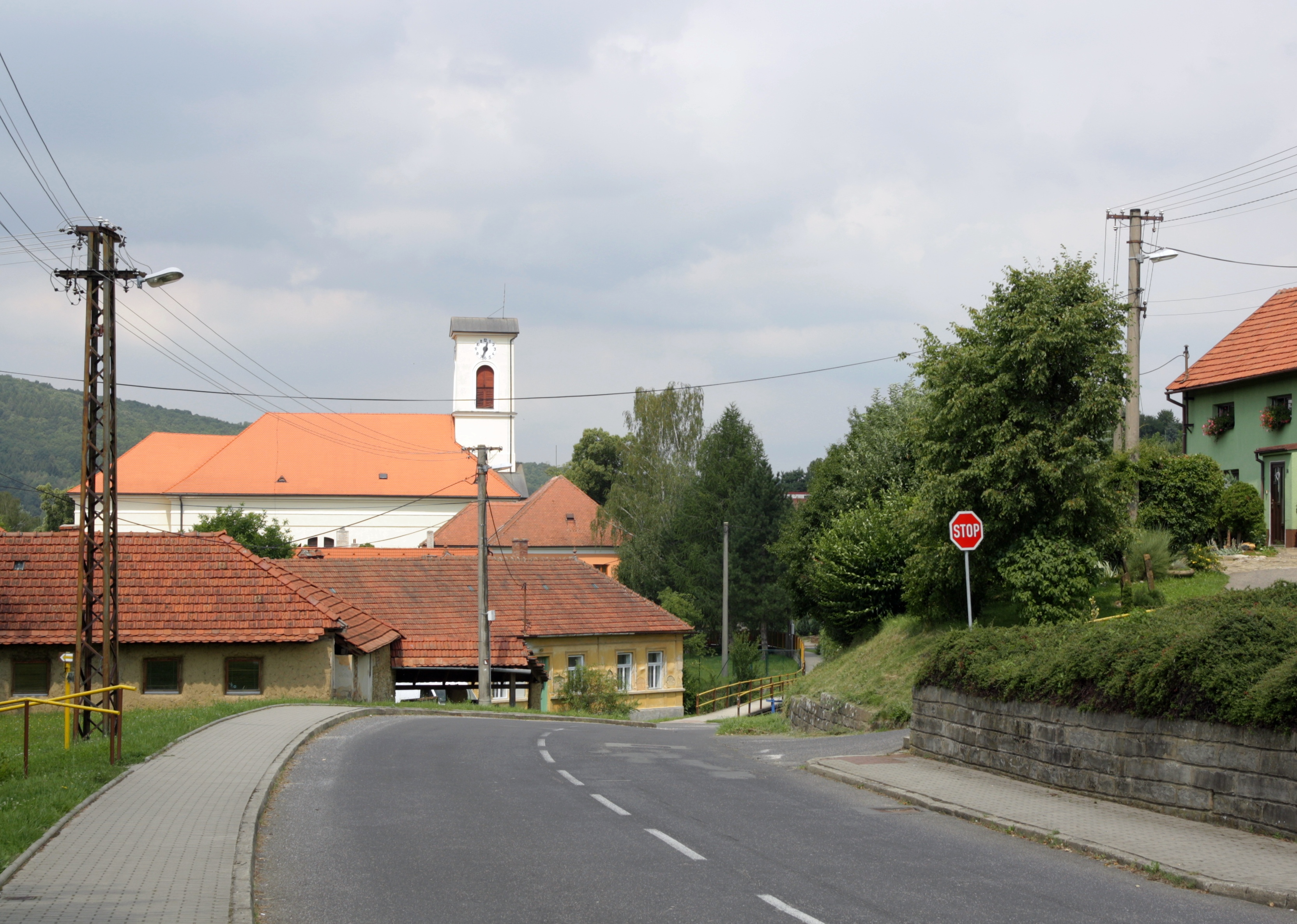
- Main street in the centre

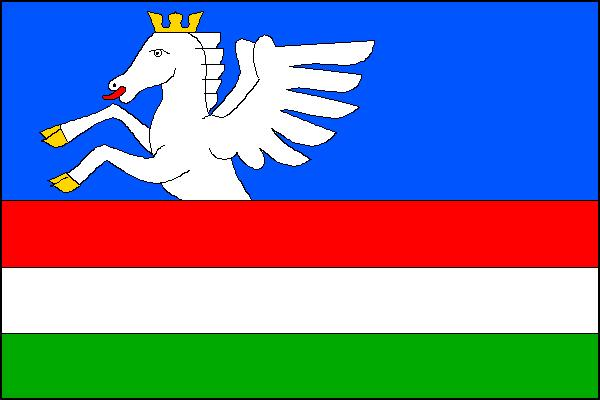
- Flag Coat of arms

- Location in the Czech Republic
- Coordinates: 48°59′38″N 17°48′3″E
- Country: Czech Republic
- Region: Zlín
- District: Uherské Hradiště
- First mentioned: 1261

Area
  - Total: 16.39 km^{2} (6.33 sq mi)
- Elevation: 364 m (1,194 ft)

Population (2026-01-01)
  - Total: 499
  - Density: 30.4/km^{2} (78.9/sq mi)
- Time zone: UTC+1 (CET)
  - Summer (DST): UTC+2 (CEST)
- Postal code: 687 71
- Website: www.komna.cz

Komňa is a municipality and village in Uherské Hradiště District in the Zlín Region of the Czech Republic. It has about 500 inhabitants.

Komňa lies approximately 28 kilometres (17 mi) east of Uherské Hradiště, 30 km (19 mi) south of Zlín, and 274 km (170 mi) south-east of Prague.

== History ==
The first written mention of Komňa is from 1261.

== Demographics ==
Historical population
Year	Pop.	±%
1869	998	—
1880	1,148	+15.0%
1890	1,279	+11.4%
1900	1,242	−2.9%
1910	1,302	+4.8%
1921	1,186	−8.9%
1930	1,082	−8.8%
1950	1,022	−5.5%
1961	822	−19.6%
1970	779	−5.2%
1980	643	−17.5%
1991	531	−17.4%
2001	543	+2.3%
2011	540	−0.6%
2021	521	−3.5%
Source: Censuses

== Notable people ==
- John Amos Comenius (1592–1670), philosopher and pedagogue; lived here and was possibly born here
