= Prakšice =

- Municipality
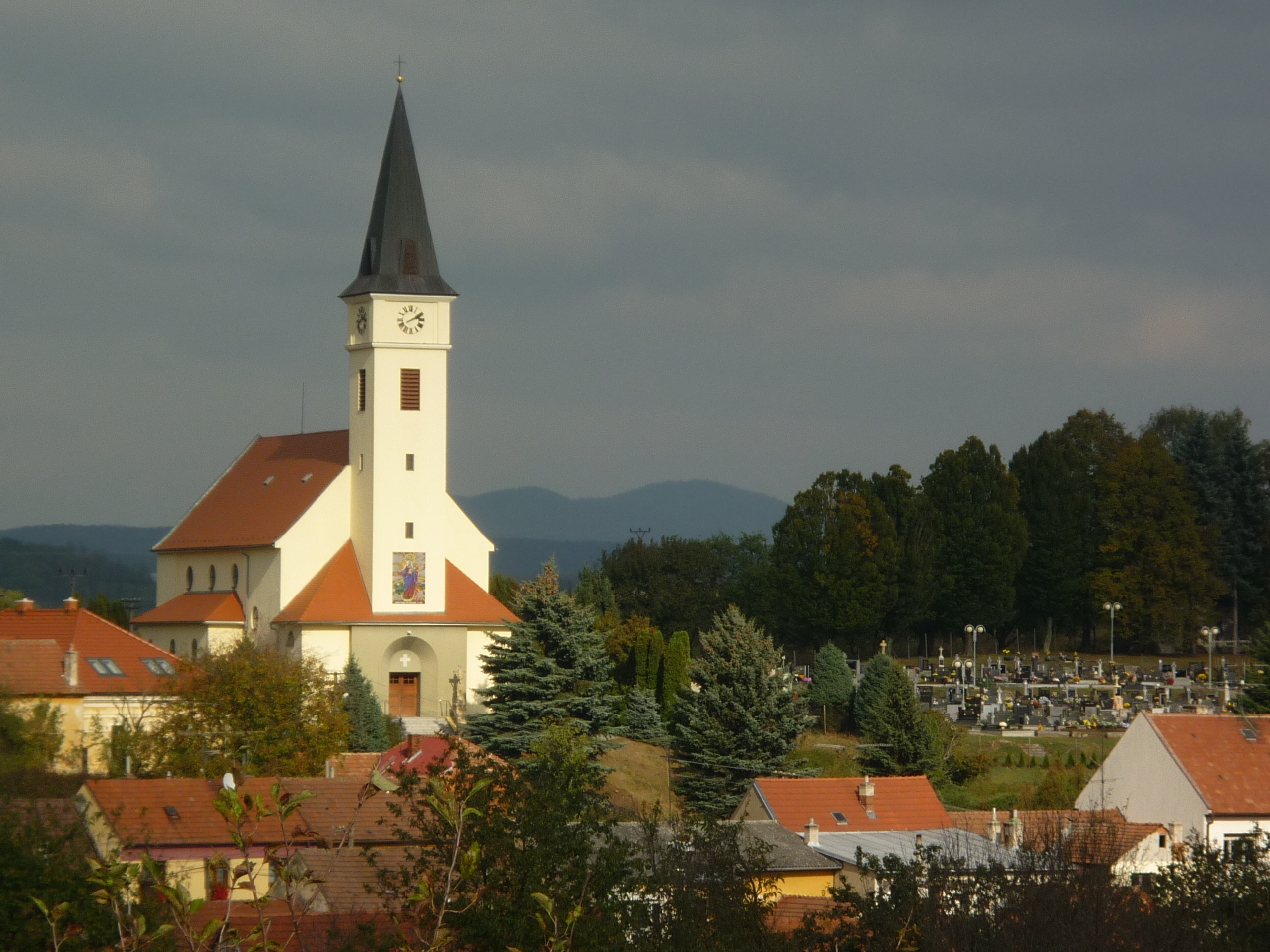
- Church of Christ the King

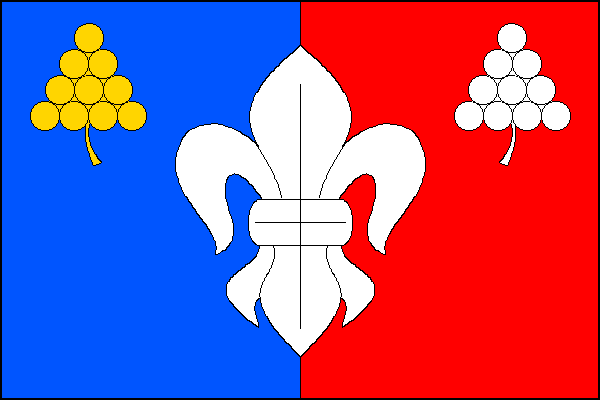
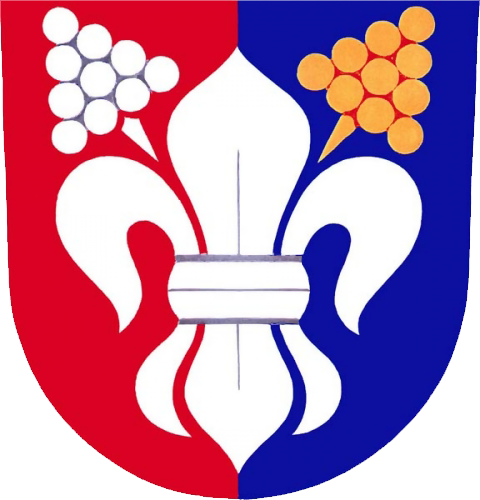
- Flag Coat of arms

- Location in the Czech Republic
- Coordinates: 49°4′8″N 17°37′59″E
- Country: Czech Republic
- Region: Zlín
- District: Uherské Hradiště
- First mentioned: 1141

Area
  - Total: 9.60 km^{2} (3.71 sq mi)
- Elevation: 235 m (771 ft)

Population (2026-01-01)
  - Total: 990
  - Density: 100/km^{2} (270/sq mi)
- Time zone: UTC+1 (CET)
  - Summer (DST): UTC+2 (CEST)
- Postal code: 687 56
- Website: www.praksice.cz

Prakšice is a municipality and village in Uherské Hradiště District in the Zlín Region of the Czech Republic. It has about 1,000 inhabitants.

Prakšice lies approximately 13 kilometres (8 mi) east of Uherské Hradiště, 19 km (12 mi) south of Zlín, and 259 km (161 mi) south-east of Prague.

== Demographics ==
Historical population
Year	Pop.	±%
1869	662	—
1880	714	+7.9%
1890	821	+15.0%
1900	887	+8.0%
1910	915	+3.2%
1921	903	−1.3%
1930	961	+6.4%
1950	905	−5.8%
1961	1,063	+17.5%
1970	1,048	−1.4%
1980	967	−7.7%
1991	945	−2.3%
2001	935	−1.1%
2011	970	+3.7%
2021	990	+2.1%
Source: Censuses
