= Vážany (Uherské Hradiště District) =

- Municipality
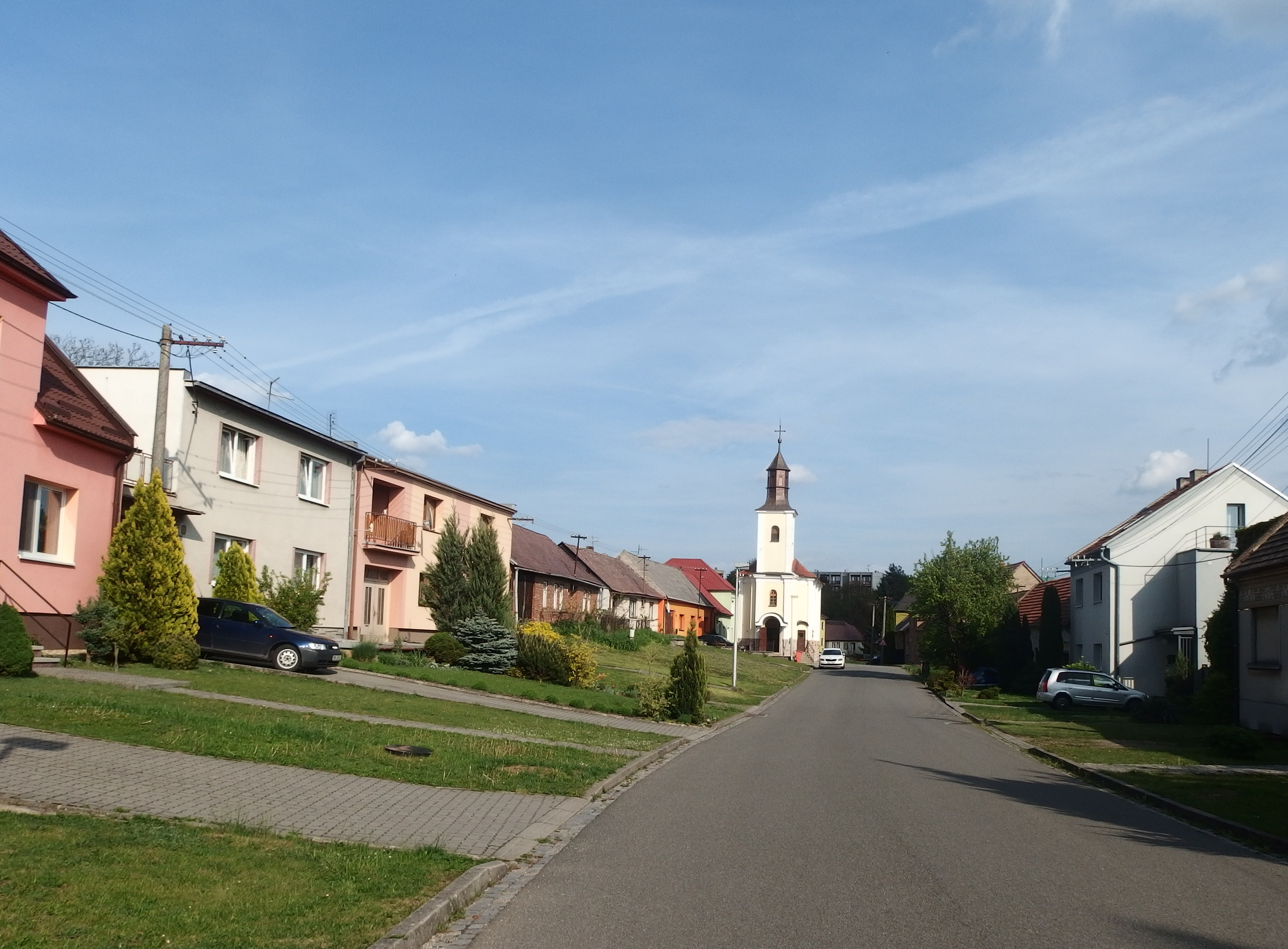
- Centre of Vážany

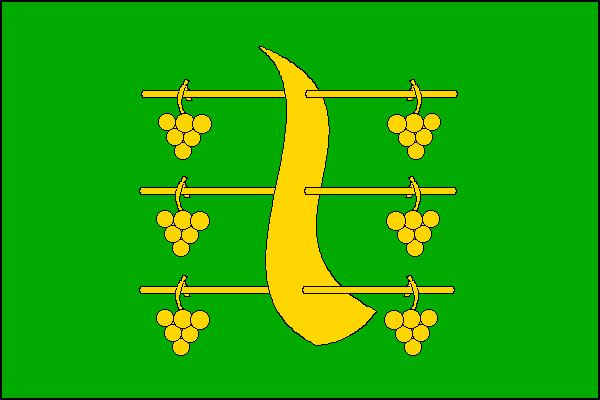
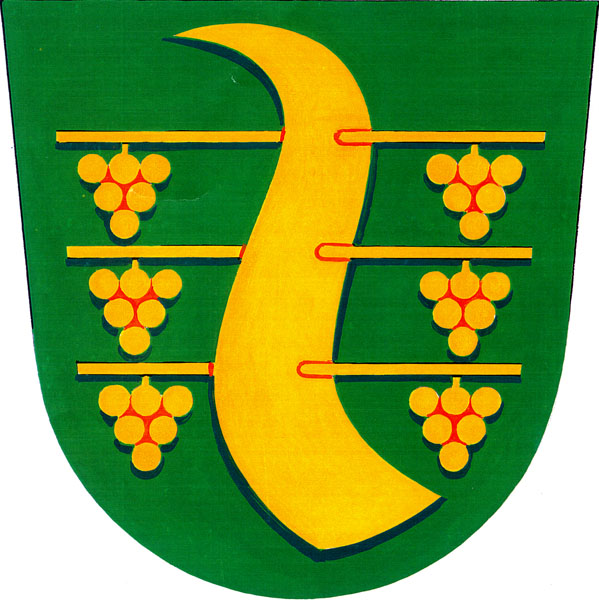
- Flag Coat of arms

- Location in the Czech Republic
- Coordinates: 49°2′4″N 17°18′43″E
- Country: Czech Republic
- Region: Zlín
- District: Uherské Hradiště
- First mentioned: 1228

Area
  - Total: 3.74 km^{2} (1.44 sq mi)
- Elevation: 320 m (1,050 ft)

Population (2026-01-01)
  - Total: 432
  - Density: 116/km^{2} (299/sq mi)
- Time zone: UTC+1 (CET)
  - Summer (DST): UTC+2 (CEST)
- Postal code: 687 37
- Website: www.obecvazany.cz

Vážany is a municipality and village in Uherské Hradiště District in the Zlín Region of the Czech Republic. It has about 400 inhabitants.

Vážany lies approximately 12 kilometres (7 mi) west of Uherské Hradiště, 34 km (21 mi) south-west of Zlín, and 240 km (150 mi) south-east of Prague.

== Demographics ==
Historical population
Year	Pop.	±%
1869	526	—
1880	620	+17.9%
1890	628	+1.3%
1900	622	−1.0%
1910	668	+7.4%
1921	678	+1.5%
1930	588	−13.3%
1950	598	+1.7%
1961	624	+4.3%
1970	538	−13.8%
1980	485	−9.9%
1991	452	−6.8%
2001	408	−9.7%
2011	415	+1.7%
2021	403	−2.9%
Source: Censuses
