= Pašovice =

- Municipality
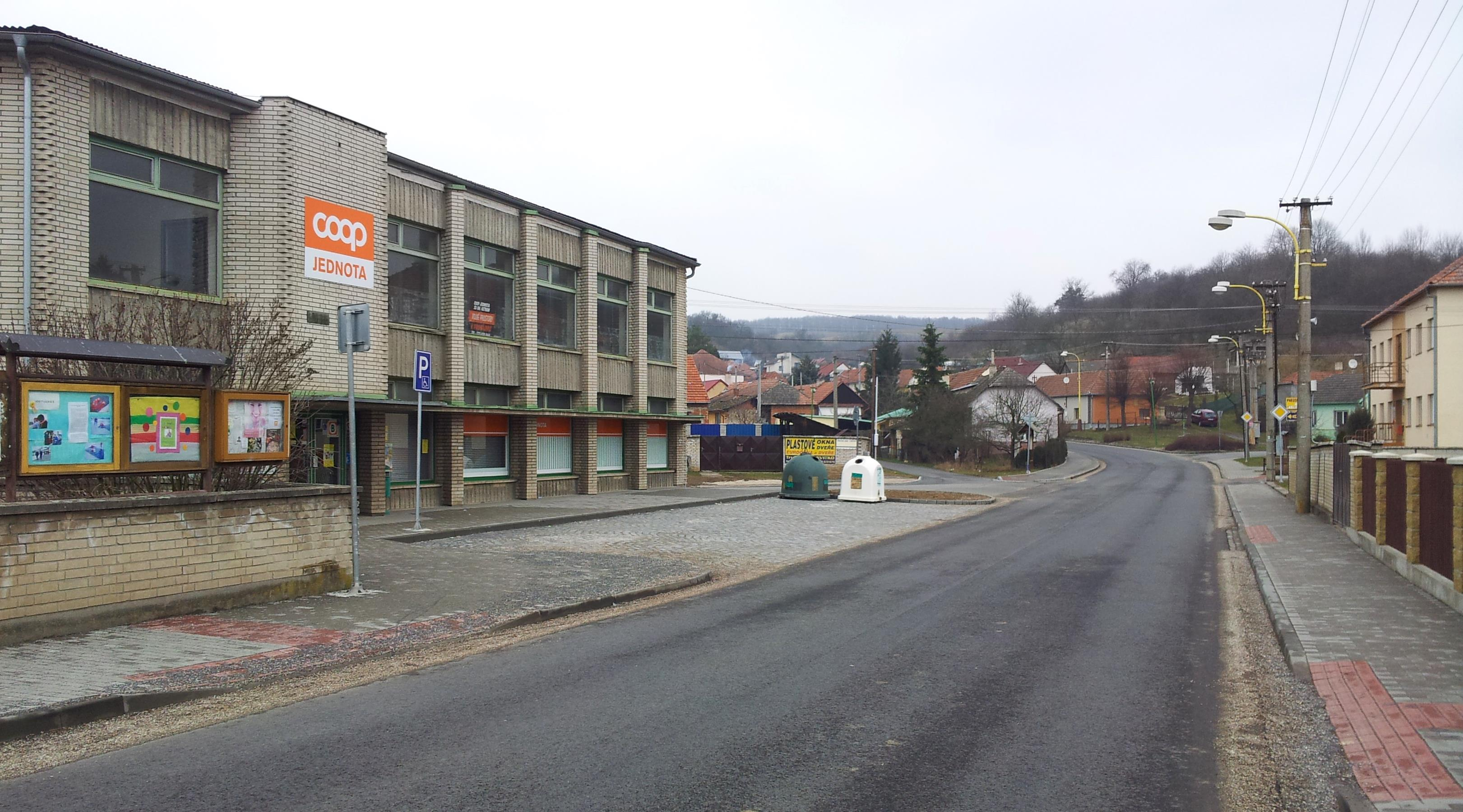
- Main street

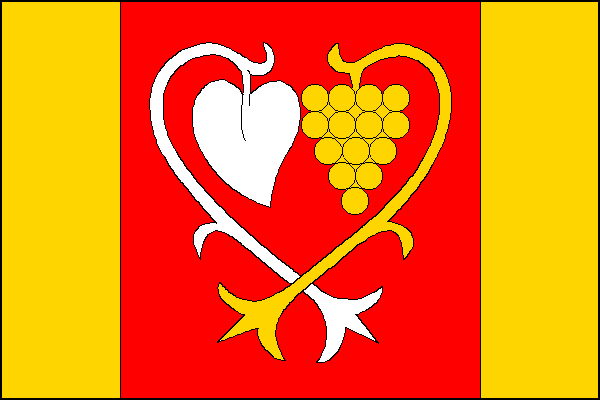
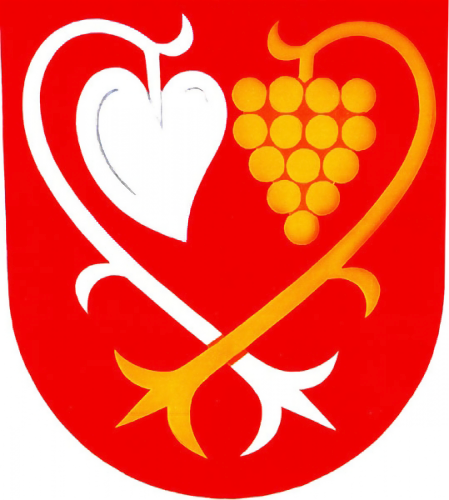
- Flag Coat of arms

- Location in the Czech Republic
- Coordinates: 49°4′46″N 17°38′40″E
- Country: Czech Republic
- Region: Zlín
- District: Uherské Hradiště
- First mentioned: 1365

Area
  - Total: 4.81 km^{2} (1.86 sq mi)
- Elevation: 237 m (778 ft)

Population (2026-01-01)
  - Total: 714
  - Density: 148/km^{2} (384/sq mi)
- Time zone: UTC+1 (CET)
  - Summer (DST): UTC+2 (CEST)
- Postal code: 687 56
- Website: www.pasovice.cz

Pašovice is a municipality and village in Uherské Hradiště District in the Zlín Region of the Czech Republic. It has about 700 inhabitants.

Pašovice lies approximately 14 kilometres (9 mi) east of Uherské Hradiště, 17 km (11 mi) south of Zlín, and 259 km (161 mi) south-east of Prague.

== Demographics ==
Historical population
Year	Pop.	±%
1869	485	—
1880	515	+6.2%
1890	522	+1.4%
1900	557	+6.7%
1910	610	+9.5%
1921	616	+1.0%
1930	615	−0.2%
1950	646	+5.0%
1961	746	+15.5%
1970	759	+1.7%
1980	721	−5.0%
1991	678	−6.0%
2001	717	+5.8%
2011	698	−2.6%
2021	666	−4.6%
Source: Censuses
