= Nedachlebice =

- Municipality
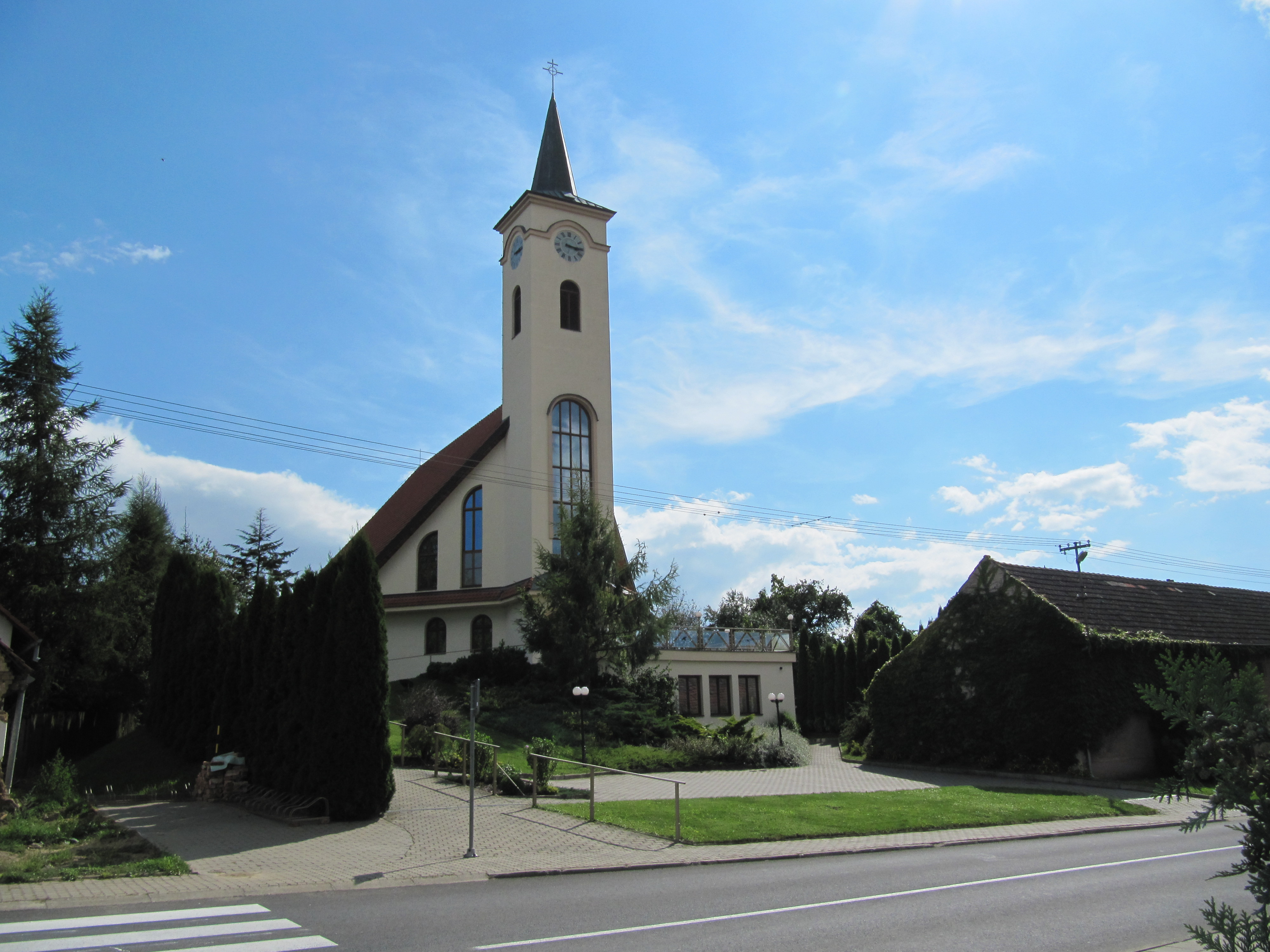
- Church of Saints Cyril and Methodius

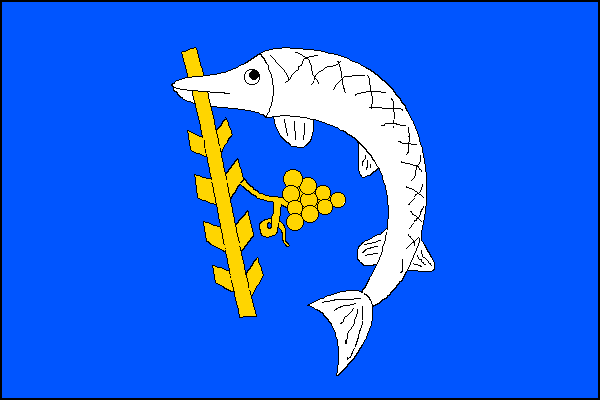
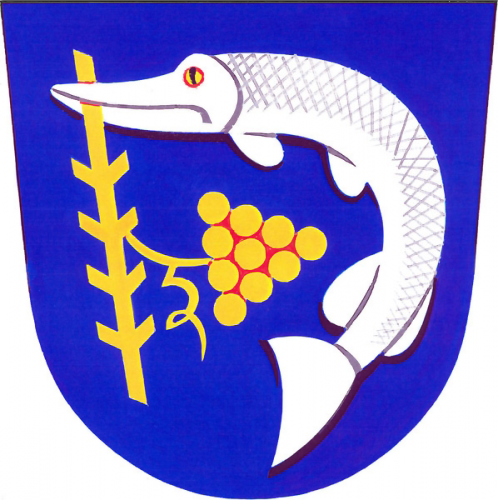
- Flag Coat of arms

- Location in the Czech Republic
- Coordinates: 49°5′57″N 17°35′21″E
- Country: Czech Republic
- Region: Zlín
- District: Uherské Hradiště
- First mentioned: 1209

Area
  - Total: 11.62 km^{2} (4.49 sq mi)
- Elevation: 205 m (673 ft)

Population (2026-01-01)
  - Total: 798
  - Density: 68.7/km^{2} (178/sq mi)
- Time zone: UTC+1 (CET)
  - Summer (DST): UTC+2 (CEST)
- Postal code: 687 12
- Website: www.nedachlebice.cz

Nedachlebice is a municipality and village in Uherské Hradiště District in the Zlín Region of the Czech Republic. It has about 800 inhabitants.

Nedachlebice lies approximately 11 kilometres (7 mi) east of Uherské Hradiště, 17 km (11 mi) south of Zlín, and 254 km (158 mi) south-east of Prague.

== Demographics ==
Historical population
Year	Pop.	±%
1869	570	—
1880	627	+10.0%
1890	675	+7.7%
1900	743	+10.1%
1910	839	+12.9%
1921	839	+0.0%
1930	842	+0.4%
1950	913	+8.4%
1961	1,050	+15.0%
1970	1,022	−2.7%
1980	976	−4.5%
1991	872	−10.7%
2001	796	−8.7%
2011	796	+0.0%
2021	759	−4.6%
Source: Censuses
