= Traplice =

- Municipality
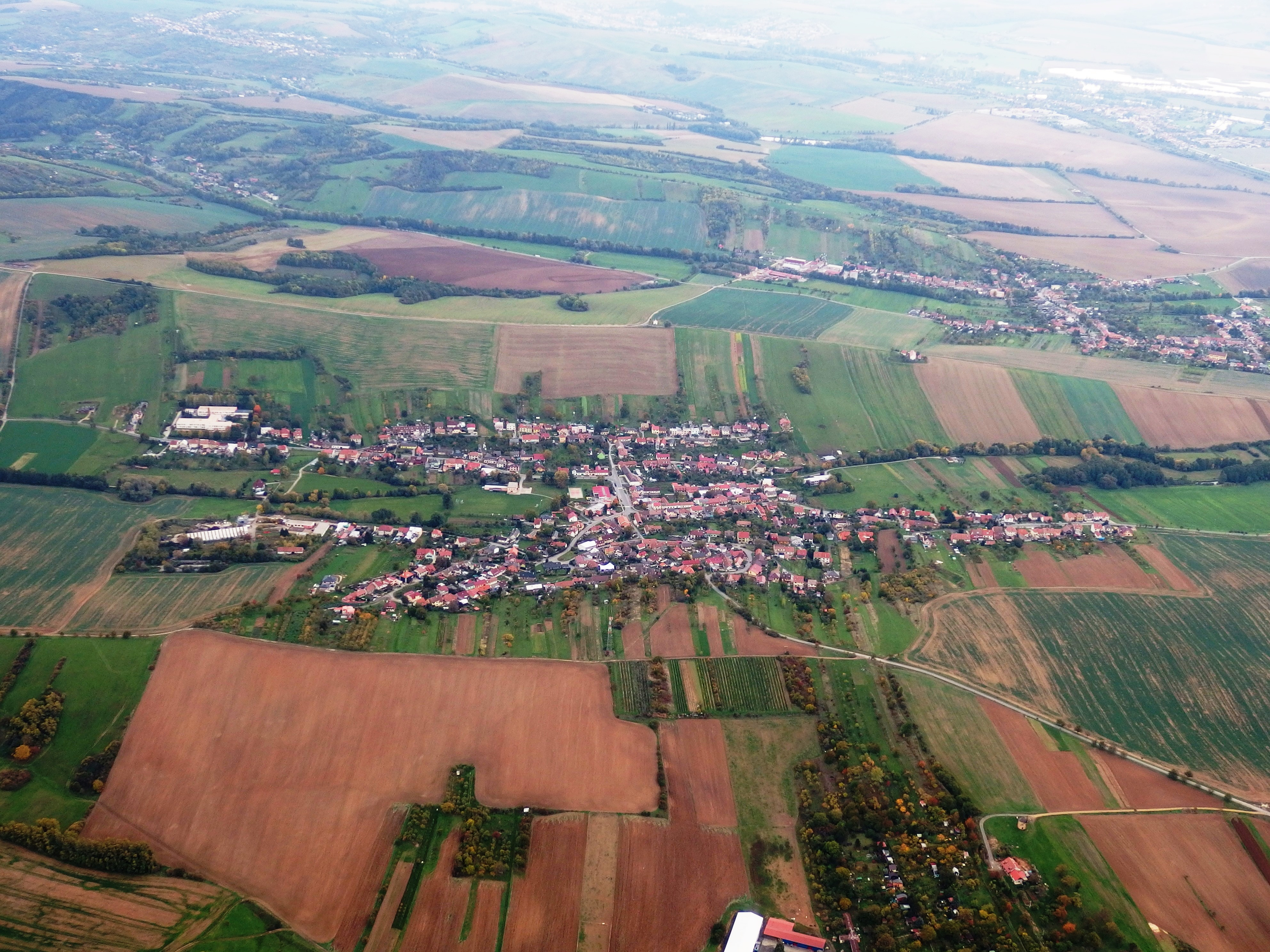
- Aerial view

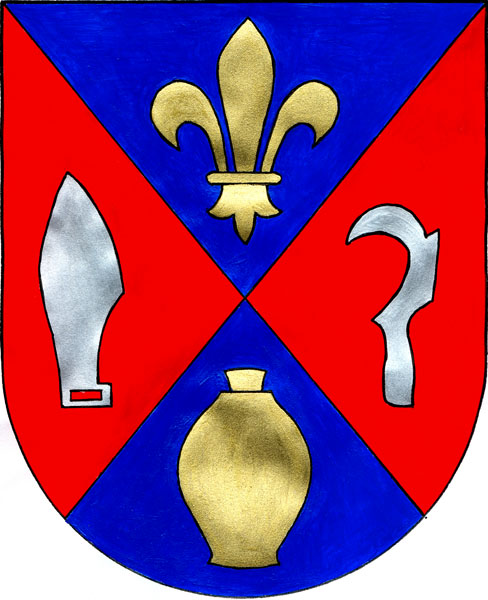
- Flag Coat of arms

- Location in the Czech Republic
- Coordinates: 49°7′51″N 17°26′10″E
- Country: Czech Republic
- Region: Zlín
- District: Uherské Hradiště
- First mentioned: 1228

Area
  - Total: 5.31 km^{2} (2.05 sq mi)
- Elevation: 223 m (732 ft)

Population (2026-01-01)
  - Total: 1,185
  - Density: 223/km^{2} (578/sq mi)
- Time zone: UTC+1 (CET)
  - Summer (DST): UTC+2 (CEST)
- Postal code: 687 04
- Website: www.traplice.cz

Traplice is a municipality and village in Uherské Hradiště District in the Zlín Region of the Czech Republic. It has about 1,200 inhabitants.

Traplice lies approximately 8 kilometres (5 mi) north of Uherské Hradiště, 21 km (13 mi) south-west of Zlín, and 242 km (150 mi) south-east of Prague.

== Demographics ==
Historical population
Year	Pop.	±%
1869	604	—
1880	687	+13.7%
1890	754	+9.8%
1900	848	+12.5%
1910	1,004	+18.4%
1921	1,037	+3.3%
1930	989	−4.6%
1950	1,210	+22.3%
1961	1,321	+9.2%
1970	1,305	−1.2%
1980	1,197	−8.3%
1991	1,102	−7.9%
2001	1,126	+2.2%
2011	1,130	+0.4%
2021	1,115	−1.3%
Source: Censuses
