= Mistřice =

- Municipality
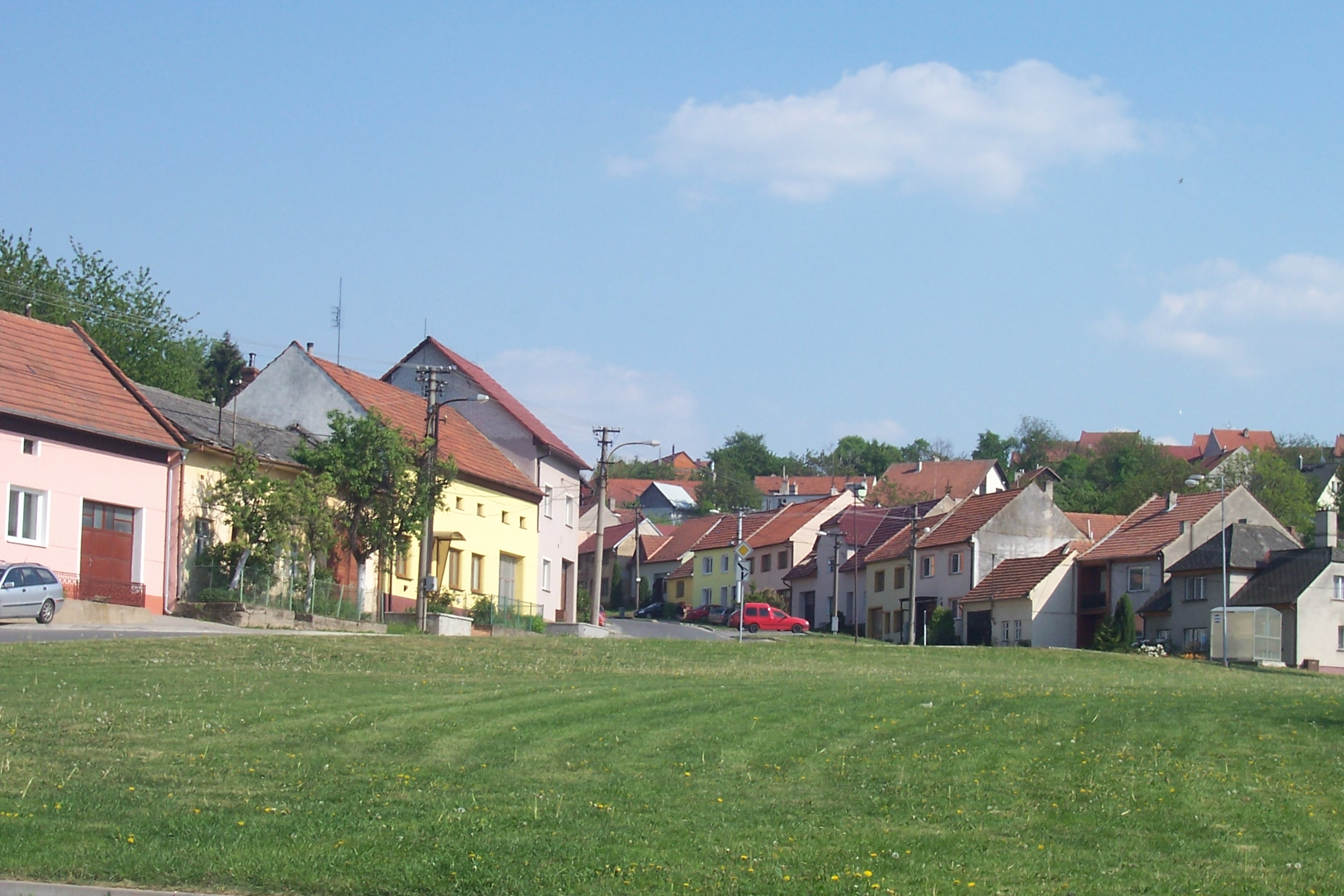
- Common in Mistřice

- Flag Coat of arms

- Location in the Czech Republic
- Coordinates: 49°5′12″N 17°32′10″E
- Country: Czech Republic
- Region: Zlín
- District: Uherské Hradiště
- First mentioned: 1247

Area
  - Total: 10.02 km^{2} (3.87 sq mi)
- Elevation: 265 m (869 ft)

Population (2026-01-01)
  - Total: 1,181
  - Density: 117.9/km^{2} (305.3/sq mi)
- Time zone: UTC+1 (CET)
  - Summer (DST): UTC+2 (CEST)
- Postal code: 687 12
- Website: mistrice.cz

Mistřice is a municipality and village in Uherské Hradiště District in the Zlín Region of the Czech Republic. It has about 1,200 inhabitants.

Mistřice lies approximately 7 kilometres (4 mi) north-east of Uherské Hradiště, 19 km (12 mi) south-west of Zlín, and 251 km (156 mi) south-east of Prague.

== Administrative division ==
Mistřice consists of two municipal parts (in brackets population according to the 2021 census):

- Mistřice (988)
- Javorovec (152)

== Demographics ==
Historical population
Year	Pop.	±%
1869	995	—
1880	1,125	+13.1%
1890	1,168	+3.8%
1900	1,236	+5.8%
1910	1,379	+11.6%
1921	1,415	+2.6%
1930	1,398	−1.2%
1950	1,500	+7.3%
1961	1,611	+7.4%
1970	1,486	−7.8%
1980	1,329	−10.6%
1991	1,180	−11.2%
2001	1,145	−3.0%
2011	1,156	+1.0%
2021	1,140	−1.4%
Source: Censuses
