= Korytná =

- Municipality
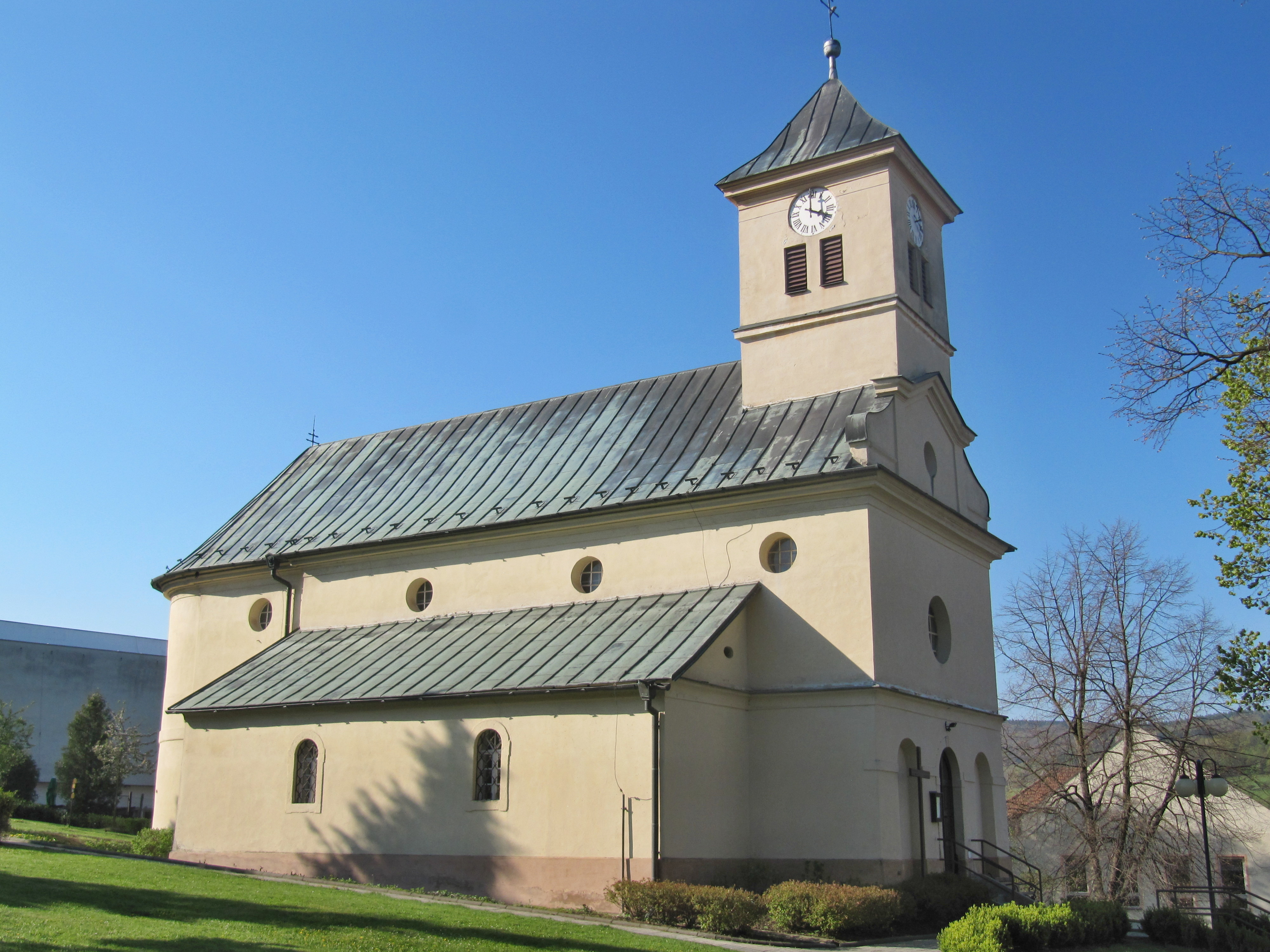
- Church of Saint Wenceslaus

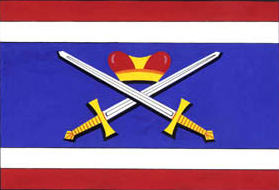
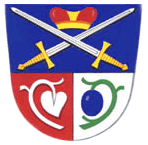
- Flag Coat of arms

- Location in the Czech Republic
- Coordinates: 48°56′28″N 17°39′55″E
- Country: Czech Republic
- Region: Zlín
- District: Uherské Hradiště
- First mentioned: 1331

Area
  - Total: 12.75 km^{2} (4.92 sq mi)
- Elevation: 340 m (1,120 ft)

Population (2026-01-01)
  - Total: 894
  - Density: 70.1/km^{2} (182/sq mi)
- Time zone: UTC+1 (CET)
  - Summer (DST): UTC+2 (CEST)
- Postal code: 687 52
- Website: www.korytna.cz

Korytná is a municipality and village in Uherské Hradiště District in the Zlín Region of the Czech Republic. It has about 900 inhabitants.

Korytná lies approximately 22 kilometres (14 mi) south-east of Uherské Hradiště, 33 km (21 mi) south of Zlín, and 268 km (167 mi) south-east of Prague.

== Demographics ==
Historical population
Year	Pop.	±%
1869	532	—
1880	574	+7.9%
1890	642	+11.8%
1900	716	+11.5%
1910	983	+37.3%
1921	949	−3.5%
1930	939	−1.1%
1950	1,042	+11.0%
1961	1,236	+18.6%
1970	1,178	−4.7%
1980	1,182	+0.3%
1991	1,048	−11.3%
2001	987	−5.8%
2011	960	−2.7%
2021	899	−6.4%
Source: Censuses
