= Uherské Hradiště District =

Uherské Hradiště District Okres Uherské Hradiště
- District
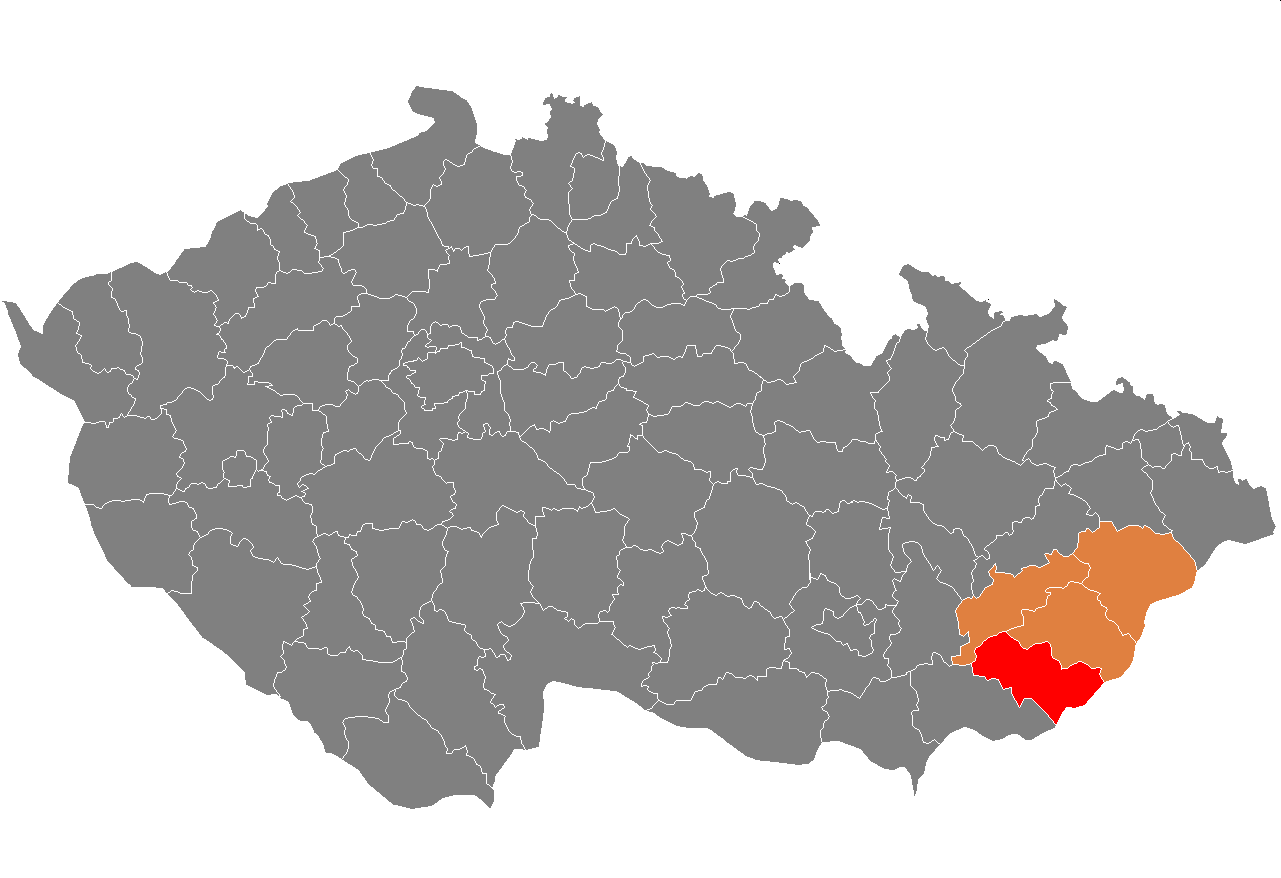
- Location in the Zlín Region within the Czech Republic
- Coordinates: 49°10′N 17°48′E
- Country: Czech Republic
- Region: Zlín
- Capital: Uherské Hradiště

Area
  - Total: 991.09 km^{2} (382.66 sq mi)

Population (2026)
  - Total: 140,823
  - Density: 142.09/km^{2} (368.01/sq mi)
- Time zone: UTC+1 (CET)
  - Summer (DST): UTC+2 (CEST)
- Municipalities: 78
- * Towns: 7
- * Market towns: 3

Uherské Hradiště District (Czech: okres Uherské Hradiště) is a district in the Zlín Region of the Czech Republic. Its capital is the town of Uherské Hradiště.

== Administrative division ==
Uherské Hradiště District is divided into two administrative districts of municipalities with extended competence: Uherské Hradiště and Uherský Brod.

=== List of municipalities ===
Towns are marked in bold and market towns in italics:

Babice - Bánov - Bílovice - Bojkovice - Boršice u Blatnice - Boršice - Břestek - Březolupy - Březová - Buchlovice - Bystřice pod Lopeníkem - Částkov - Dolní Němčí - Drslavice - Hluk - Horní Němčí - Hostějov - Hostětín - Hradčovice - Huštěnovice - Jalubí - Jankovice - Kněžpole - Komňa - Korytná - Košíky - Kostelany nad Moravou - Kudlovice - Kunovice - Lopeník - Medlovice - Mistřice - Modrá - Nedachlebice - Nedakonice - Nezdenice - Nivnice - Ořechov - Ostrožská Lhota - Ostrožská Nová Ves - Osvětimany - Pašovice - Pitín - Podolí - Polešovice - Popovice - Prakšice - Rudice - Salaš - Slavkov - Staré Hutě - Staré Město - Starý Hrozenkov - Strání - Stříbrnice - Stupava - Suchá Loz - Šumice - Sušice - Svárov - Topolná - Traplice - Tučapy - Tupesy - Uherské Hradiště - Uherský Brod - Uherský Ostroh - Újezdec - Vápenice - Vážany - Velehrad - Veletiny - Vlčnov - Vyškovec - Záhorovice - Žítková Zlámanec - Zlechov

== Geography ==
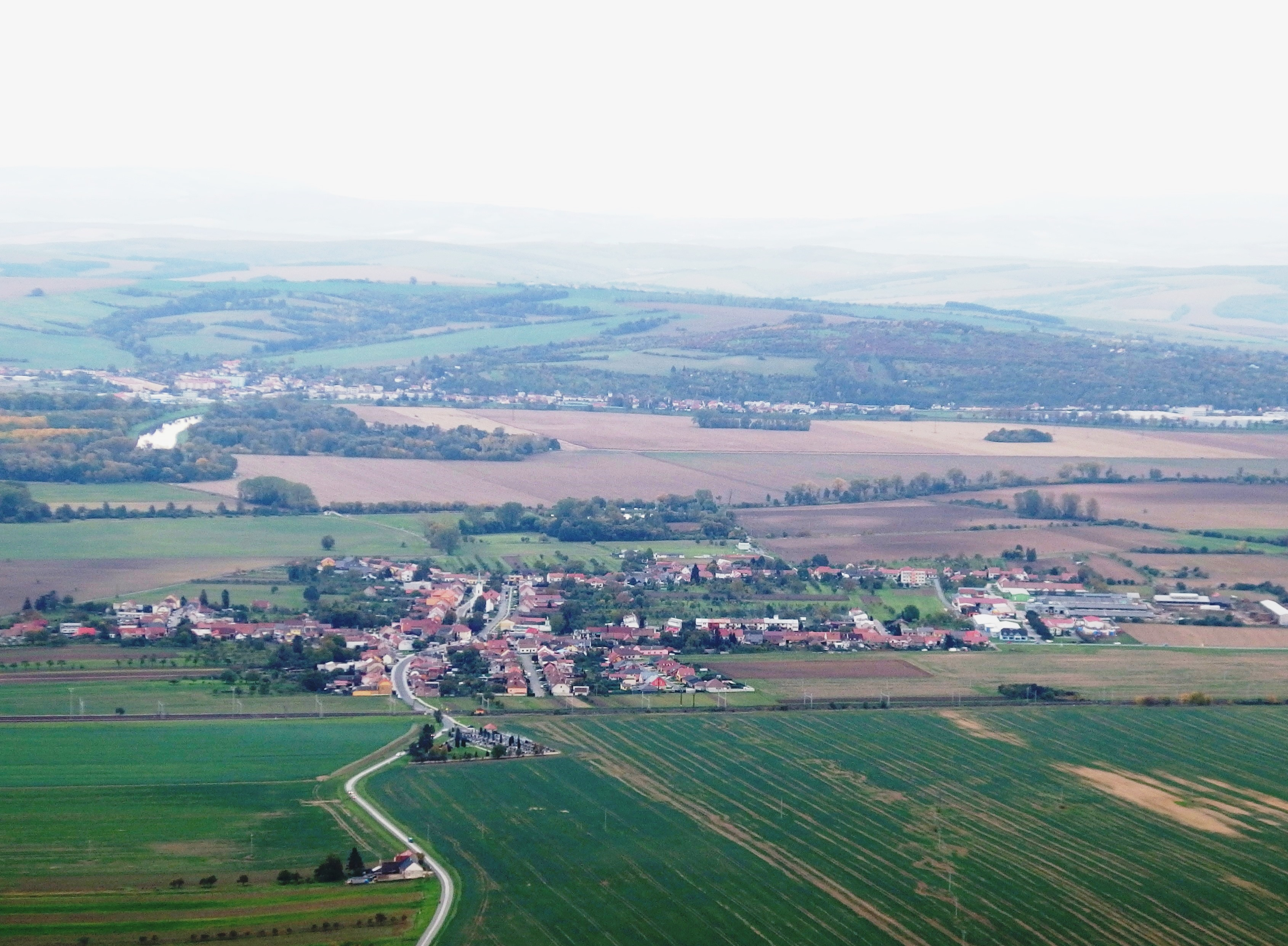
Huštěnovice and surrounding landscape

Uherské Hradiště District borders Slovakia in the southeast. The terrain is very varied. A lowland runs through the centre of the territory, which is surrounded by highlands and mountains. The territory extends into five geomorphological mesoregions: Vizovice Highlands (most of the territory), White Carpathians (southeast), Lower Morava Valley (a strip from southwest to north), Kyjov Hills (a strip from west to north) and Chřiby (northwest). The highest point of the district is the mountain Velká Javořina in Strání with an elevation of 970 m (3,180 ft). The lowest point of the district is the river bed of the Nová Morava Channel of the Morava River in Uherský Ostroh at 169 m (554 ft).

From the total district area of 991.1 km^{2} (382.7 sq mi), agricultural land occupies 566.3 km^{2} (218.6 sq mi), forests occupy 302.7 km^{2} (116.9 sq mi), and water area occupies 17.3 km^{2} (6.7 sq mi). Forests cover 30.5% of the district's area.

The main river of the district is the Morava, which flows across the district from north to south. Apart from several artificial lakes, created by the flooding of gravel quarries, and a few oxbow lakes of the Morava River, there are almost no bodies of water.

Bílé Karpaty is a protected landscape area that covers the southeastern part of the district.

== Demographics ==
Historical population

Year	Pop.	±%
1869	80,908	—
1880	88,412	+9.3%
1890	94,051	+6.4%
1900	103,149	+9.7%
1910	111,791	+8.4%

Year	Pop.	±%
1921	115,953	+3.7%
1930	115,259	−0.6%
1950	123,022	+6.7%
1961	140,222	+14.0%
1970	142,121	+1.4%

Year	Pop.	±%
1980	147,371	+3.7%
1991	145,188	−1.5%
2001	144,517	−0.5%
2011	141,467	−2.1%
2021	137,280	−3.0%

Source: Censuses

=== Most populous municipalities ===
Name	Population	Area (km^{2})
Uherské Hradiště	24,852	21
Uherský Brod	16,280	52
Staré Město	6,660	21
Kunovice	5,592	29
Bojkovice	4,395	42
Hluk	4,242	28
Uherský Ostroh	4,168	27
Ostrožská Nová Ves	3,362	26
Nivnice	3,347	25
Strání	3,330	40

== Economy ==
The largest employers with headquarters in Uherské Hradiště District and at least 500 employees are:

Economic entity	Location	Number of employees	Main activity
Uherské Hradiště Hospital	Uherské Hradiště	2,000–2,499	Health care
Česká zbrojovka	Uherský Brod	1,000–1,499	Manufacture of firearms
Aircraft Industries	Kunovice	500–999	Manufacture of airplanes
Ray Service	Staré Město	500–999	Manufacture of cable harnesses
Sociální služby Uherské Hradiště	Uherské Hradiště	500–999	Social work
Slovácké strojírny	Uherský Brod	500–999	Manufacture of lifting and handling equipment
Jednota spotřební družstvo v Uherském Ostrohu	Uherský Ostroh	500–999	Retail sale

== Transport ==
There are no motorways passing through the district. The most important road is the I/50 (part of the European route E50) from Brno to Trenčín.

== Sights ==
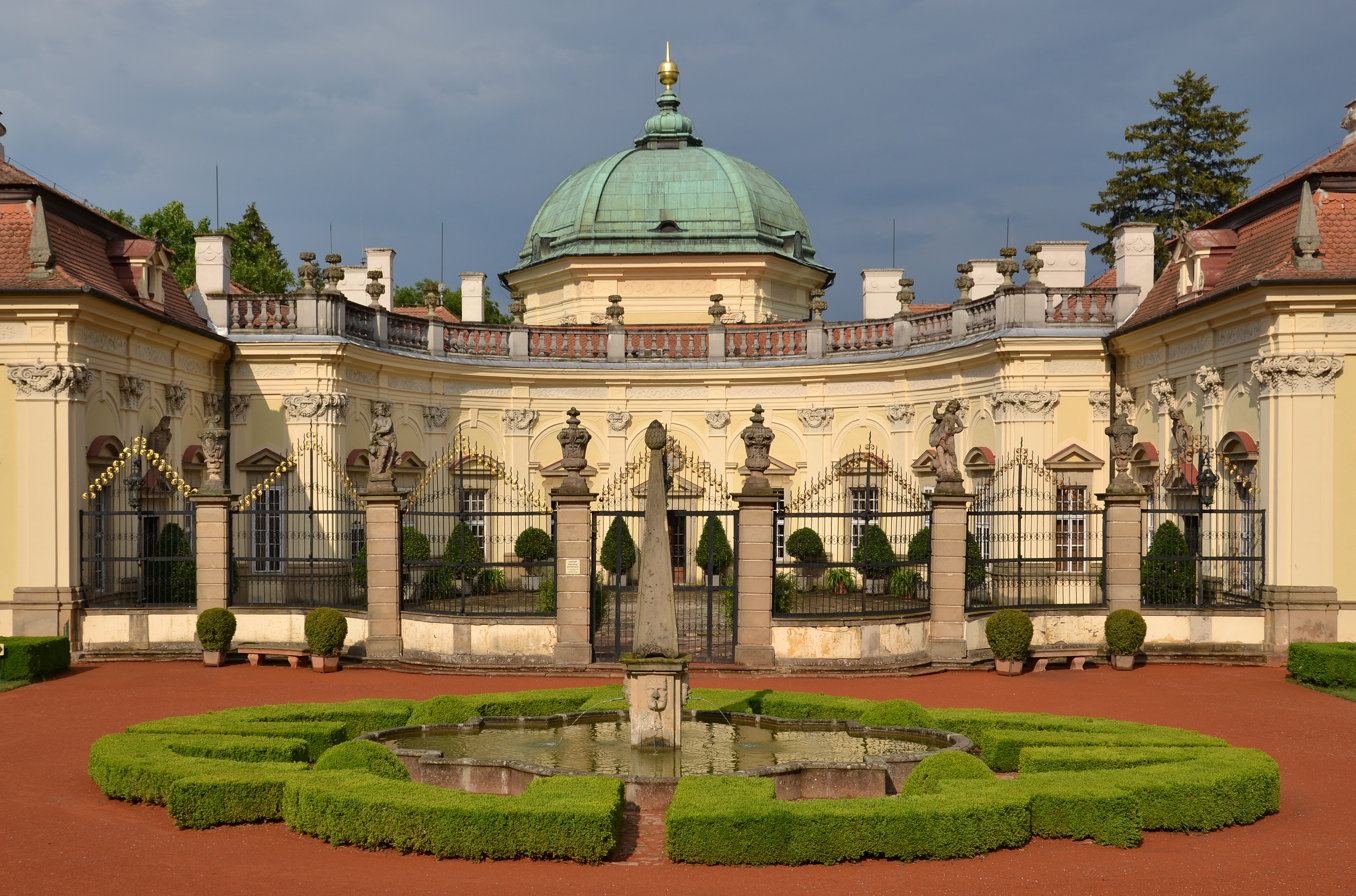
Buchlovice Castle

The most important monuments in the district, protected as national cultural monuments, are:

- A set of monuments of the Great Moravian residential agglomeration in Staré Město – Uherské Hradiště – Modrá
- Gord of Saint Clement in Osvětimany
- Buchlov Castle
- Buchlovice Castle
- Basilica of the Assumption of the Virgin Mary and Saints Cyril and Methodius in Velehrad

The best-preserved settlements, protected as monument reservations and monument zones, are:

- Veletiny-Stará Hora (monument reservation)
- Vlčnov-Kojiny (monument reservation)
- Uherské Hradiště
- Uherský Brod
- Uherský Ostroh

Five of the ten most visited tourist destinations of the Zlín Region are located in Uherské Hradiště District. The most visited tourist destinations are Aquapark Uherské Hradiště, the amusement park Kovozoo in Staré Město, the basilica in Velehrad, the ichthyological and botanical exhibition Živá voda in Modrá, and Archeoskanzen Modrá.
