= Břestek =

- Municipality
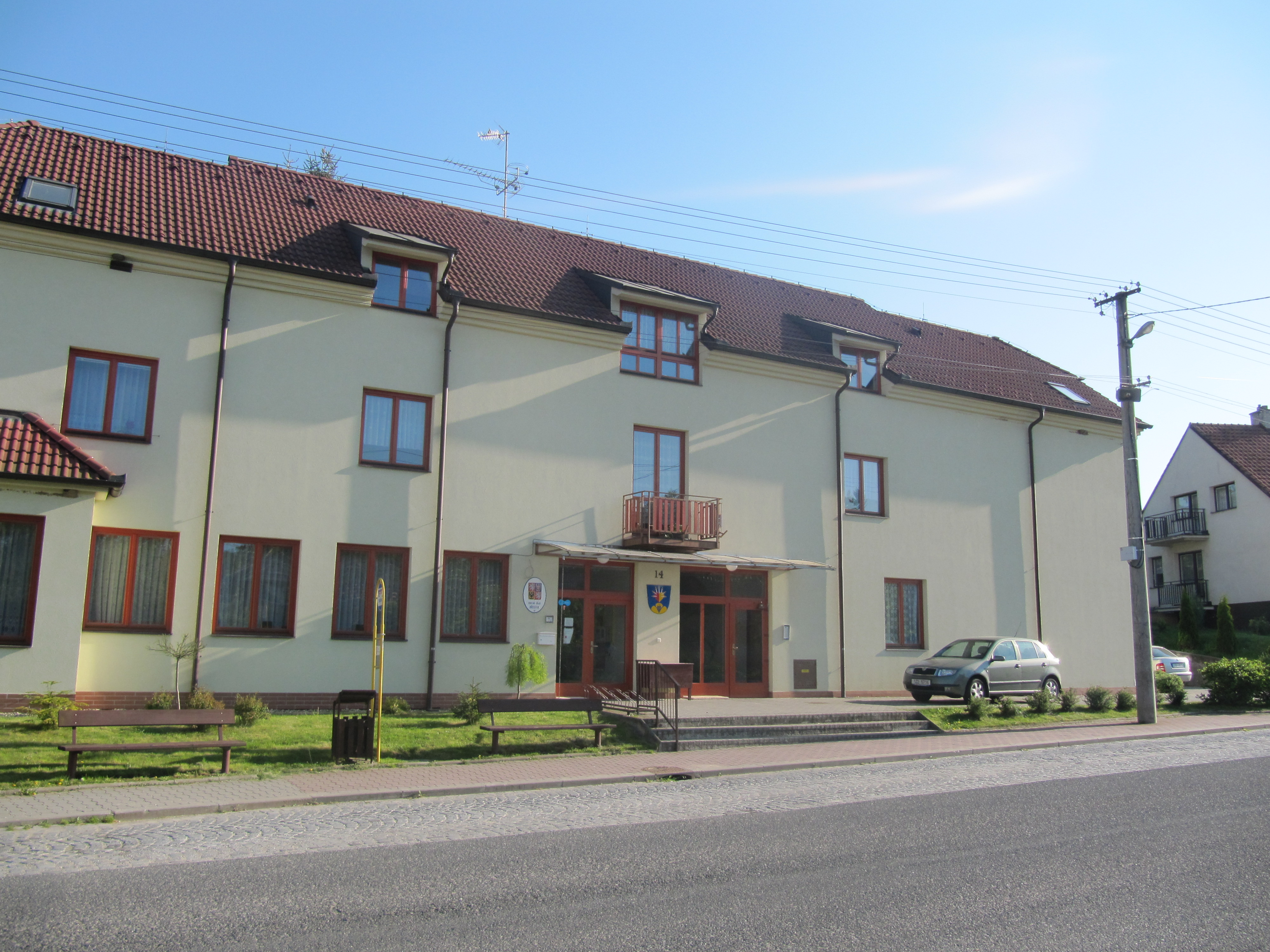
- Municipal office

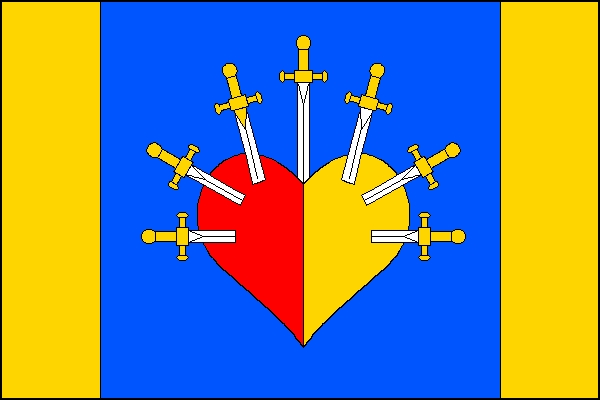
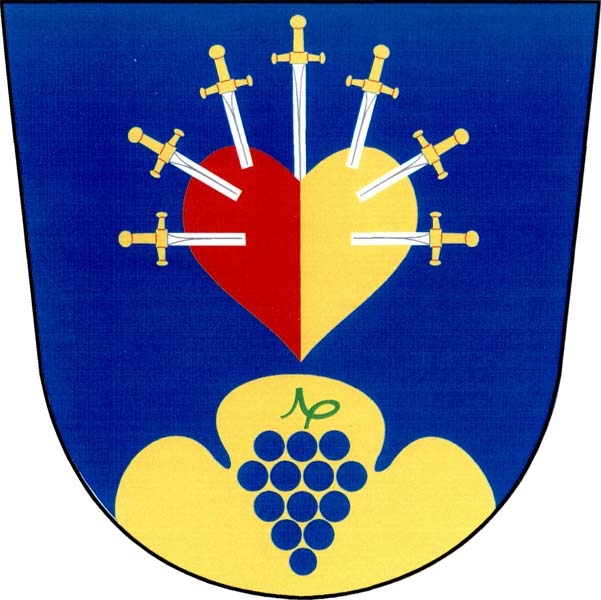
- Flag Coat of arms

- Location in the Czech Republic
- Coordinates: 49°5′42″N 17°21′21″E
- Country: Czech Republic
- Region: Zlín
- District: Uherské Hradiště
- First mentioned: 1141

Area
  - Total: 14.15 km^{2} (5.46 sq mi)
- Elevation: 238 m (781 ft)

Population (2026-01-01)
  - Total: 890
  - Density: 63/km^{2} (160/sq mi)
- Time zone: UTC+1 (CET)
  - Summer (DST): UTC+2 (CEST)
- Postal code: 687 08
- Website: www.brestek.cz

Břestek is a municipality and village in Uherské Hradiště District in the Zlín Region of the Czech Republic. It has about 900 inhabitants.

Břestek lies approximately 10 kilometres (6 mi) north-west of Uherské Hradiště, 28 km (17 mi) south-west of Zlín, and 238 km (148 mi) south-east of Prague.

== Demographics ==
Historical population
Year	Pop.	±%
1869	788	—
1880	800	+1.5%
1890	831	+3.9%
1900	884	+6.4%
1910	904	+2.3%
1921	918	+1.5%
1930	880	−4.1%
1950	836	−5.0%
1961	905	+8.3%
1970	905	+0.0%
1980	750	−17.1%
1991	611	−18.5%
2001	698	+14.2%
2011	753	+7.9%
2021	801	+6.4%
Source: Censuses
