= Kostelany nad Moravou =

- Municipality
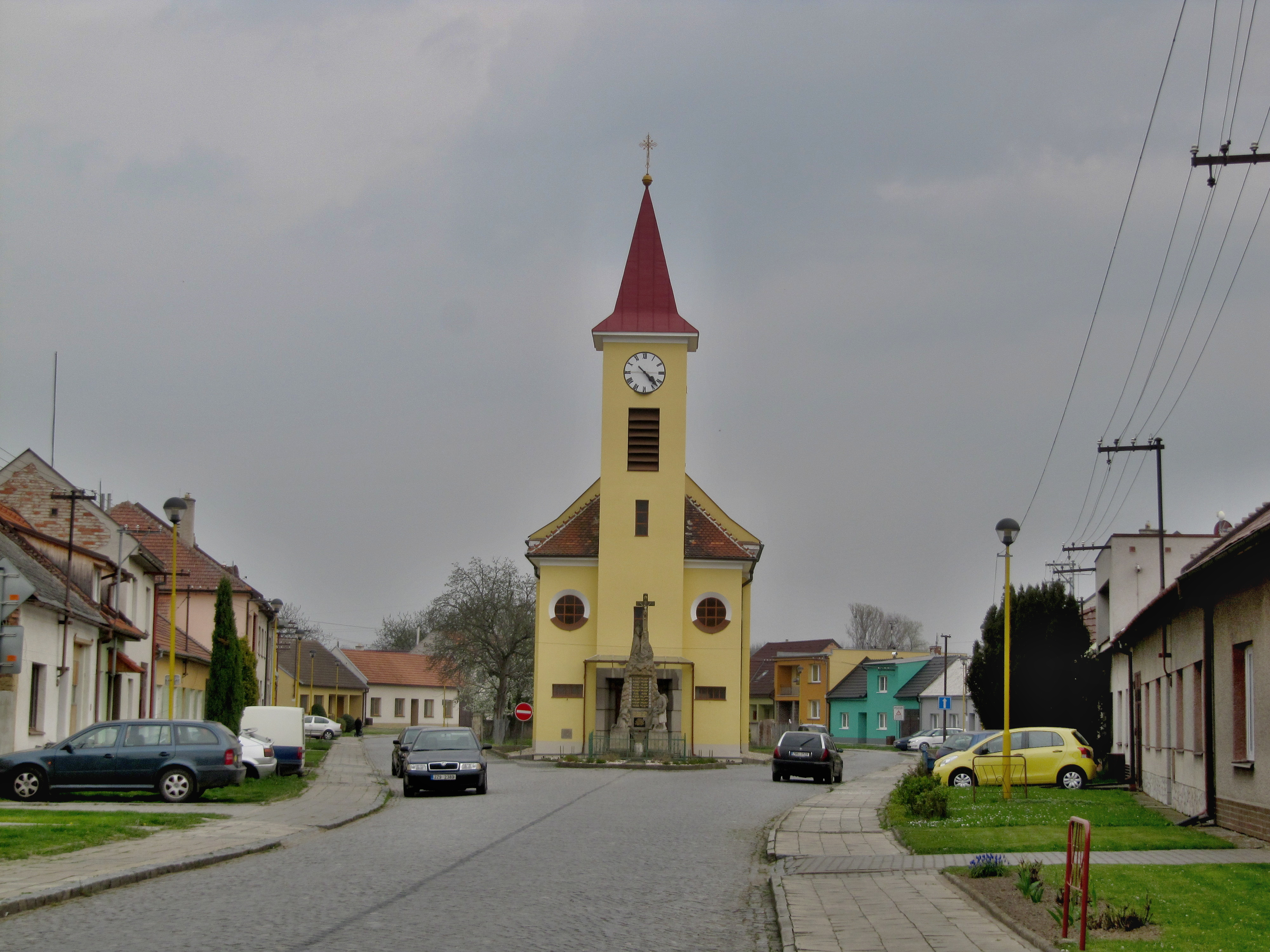
- Centre with Church of Saint Florian

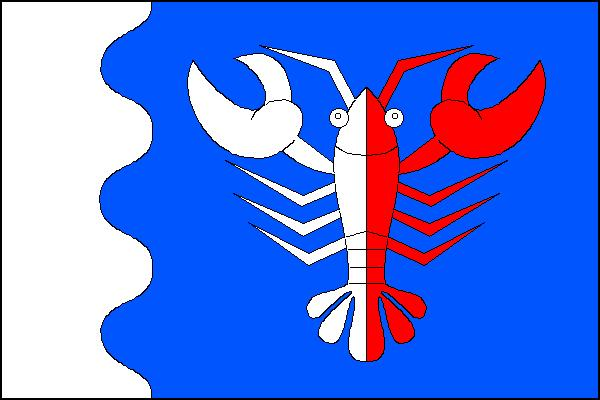
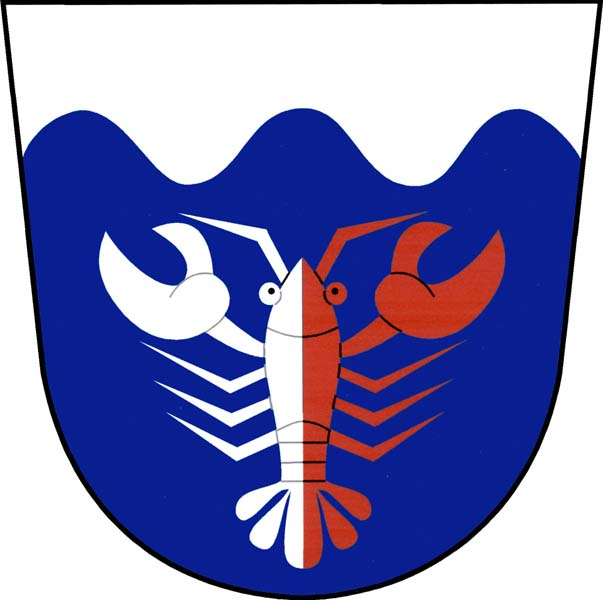
- Flag Coat of arms

- Location in the Czech Republic
- Coordinates: 49°2′43″N 17°24′25″E
- Country: Czech Republic
- Region: Zlín
- District: Uherské Hradiště
- First mentioned: 1131

Area
  - Total: 4.76 km^{2} (1.84 sq mi)
- Elevation: 177 m (581 ft)

Population (2026-01-01)
  - Total: 876
  - Density: 184/km^{2} (477/sq mi)
- Time zone: UTC+1 (CET)
  - Summer (DST): UTC+2 (CEST)
- Postal code: 686 01
- Website: www.kostelanynadmoravou.cz

Kostelany nad Moravou is a municipality and village in Uherské Hradiště District in the Zlín Region of the Czech Republic. It has about 900 inhabitants.

Kostelany nad Moravou lies approximately 5 kilometres (3 mi) south-west of Uherské Hradiště, 29 km (18 mi) south-west of Zlín, and 245 km (152 mi) south-east of Prague.

== Demographics ==
Historical population
Year	Pop.	±%
1869	635	—
1880	702	+10.6%
1890	758	+8.0%
1900	817	+7.8%
1910	865	+5.9%
1921	932	+7.7%
1930	895	−4.0%
1950	919	+2.7%
1961	1,035	+12.6%
1970	1,042	+0.7%
1980	968	−7.1%
1991	906	−6.4%
2001	888	−2.0%
2011	887	−0.1%
2021	843	−5.0%
Source: Censuses
