= Újezdec (Uherské Hradiště District) =

- Municipality
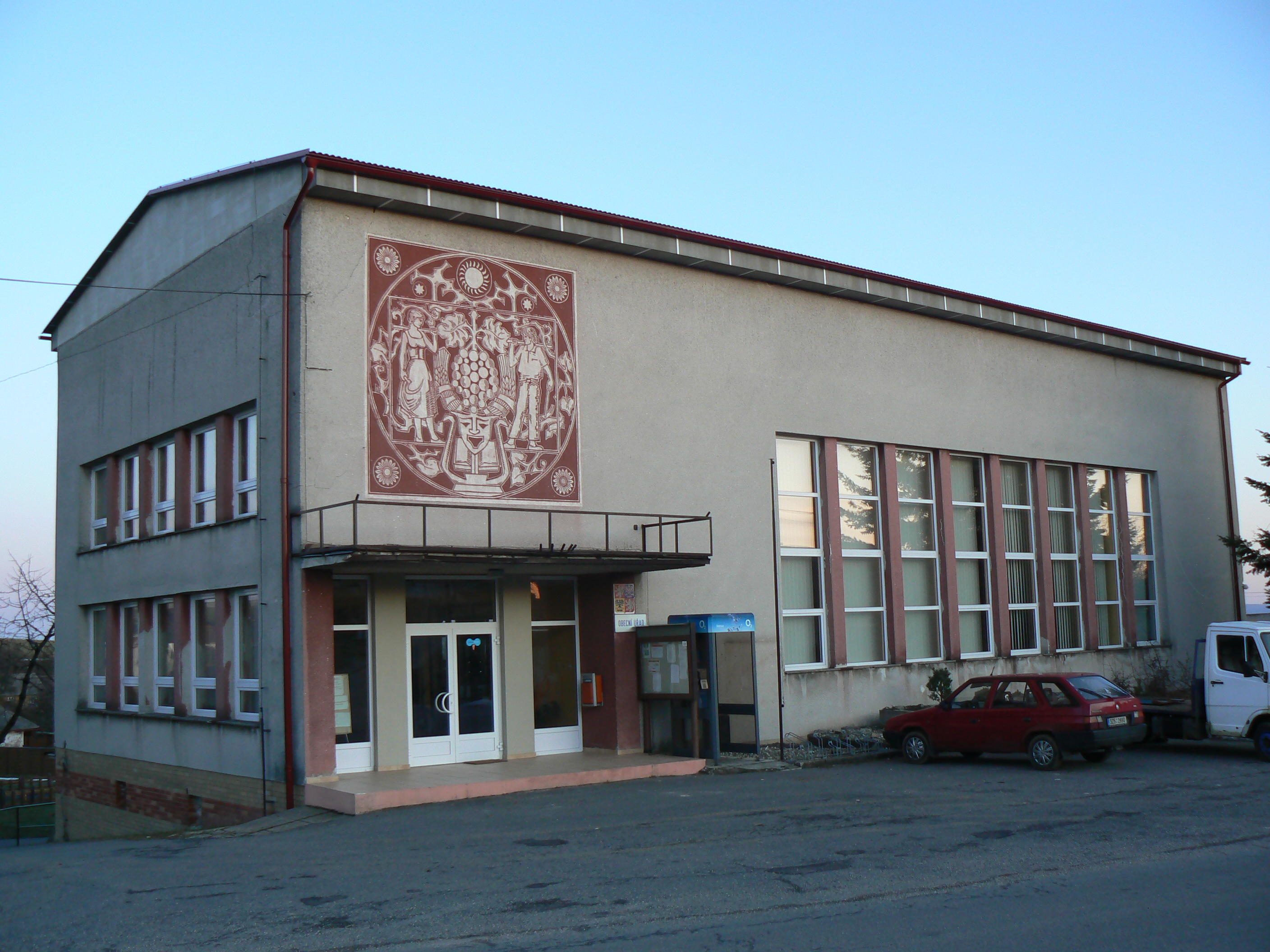
- Municipal office

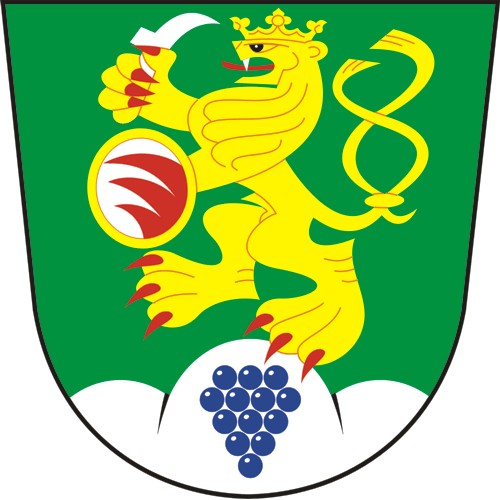
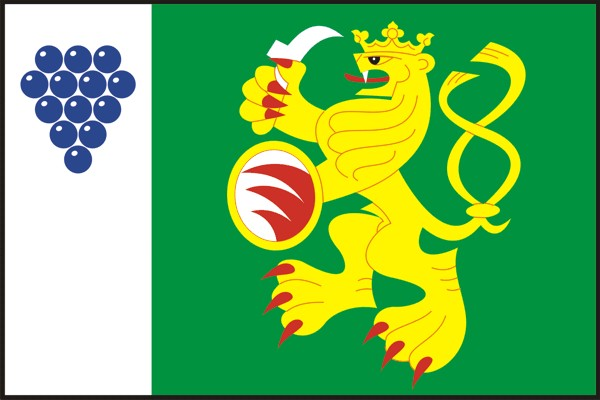
- Flag Coat of arms

- Location in the Czech Republic
- Coordinates: 49°2′10″N 17°16′19″E
- Country: Czech Republic
- Region: Zlín
- District: Uherské Hradiště
- First mentioned: 1437

Area
  - Total: 3.40 km^{2} (1.31 sq mi)
- Elevation: 337 m (1,106 ft)

Population (2026-01-01)
  - Total: 260
  - Density: 76/km^{2} (200/sq mi)
- Time zone: UTC+1 (CET)
  - Summer (DST): UTC+2 (CEST)
- Postal code: 687 41
- Website: ujezdec.cz

Újezdec is a municipality and village in Uherské Hradiště District in the Zlín Region of the Czech Republic. It has about 300 inhabitants.

Újezdec lies approximately 14 kilometres (9 mi) west of Uherské Hradiště, 36 km (22 mi) south-west of Zlín, and 237 km (147 mi) south-east of Prague.

== Demographics ==
Historical population
Year	Pop.	±%
1869	449	—
1880	424	−5.6%
1890	397	−6.4%
1900	438	+10.3%
1910	495	+13.0%
1921	459	−7.3%
1930	444	−3.3%
1950	371	−16.4%
1961	443	+19.4%
1970	387	−12.6%
1980	274	−29.2%
1991	261	−4.7%
2001	227	−13.0%
2011	219	−3.5%
2021	236	+7.8%
Source: Censuses
