= Kudlovice =

- Municipality
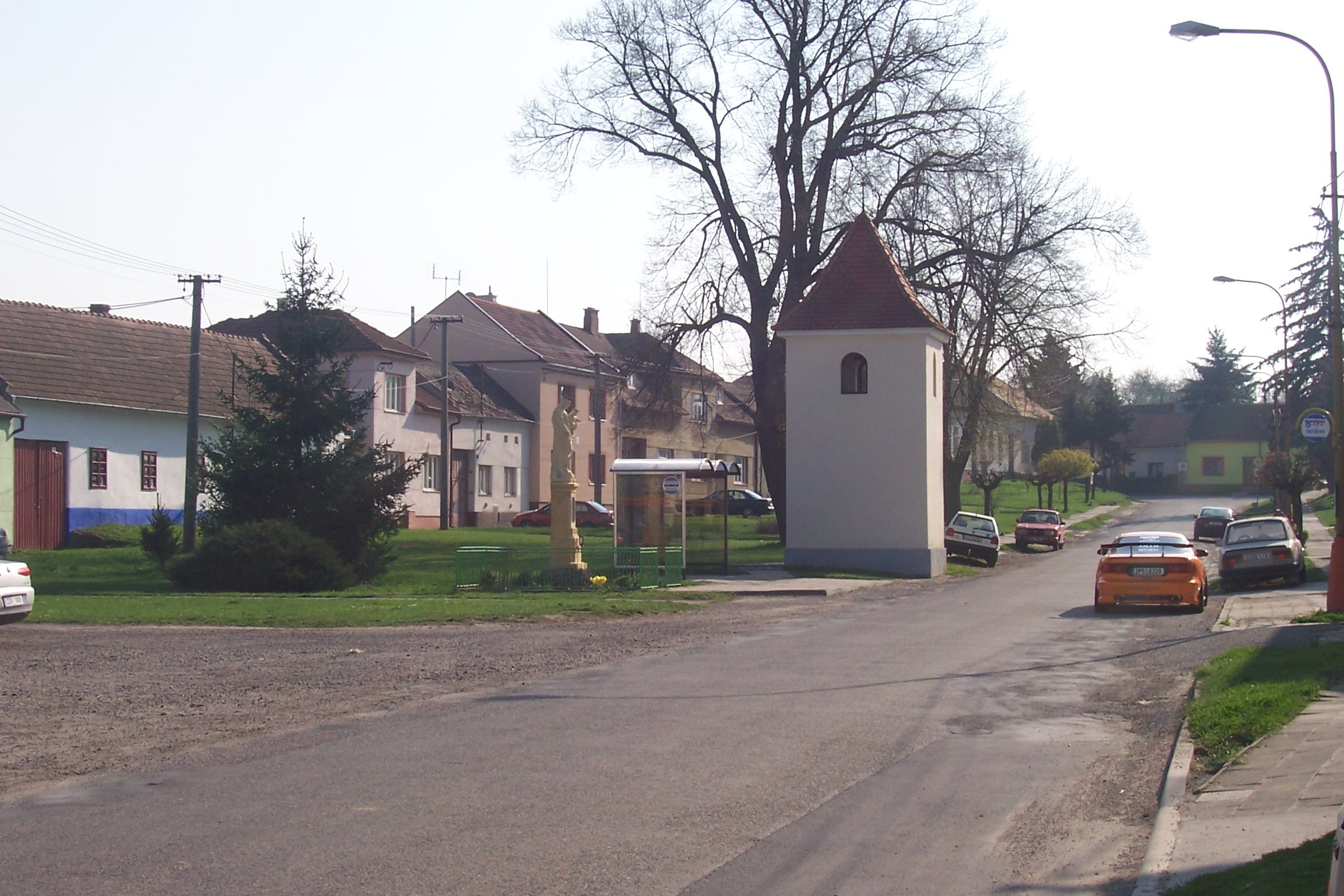
- Centre of Kudlovice with a belfry

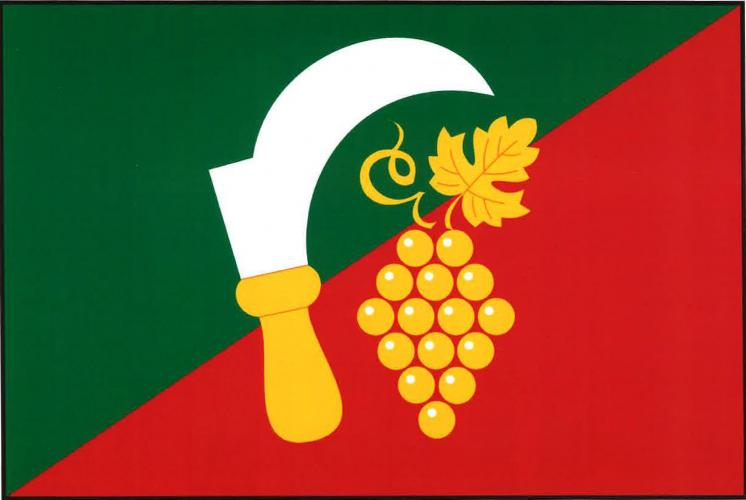
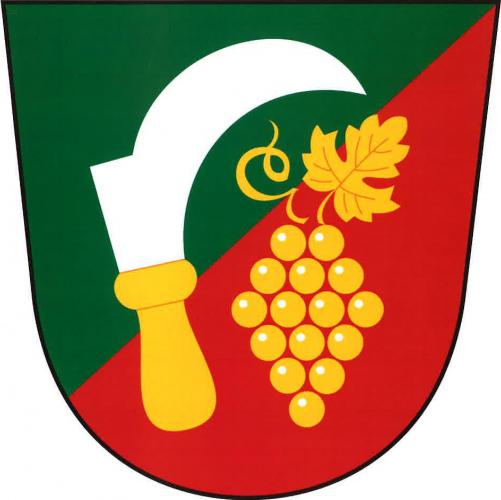
- Flag Coat of arms

- Location in the Czech Republic
- Coordinates: 49°7′54″N 17°27′26″E
- Country: Czech Republic
- Region: Zlín
- District: Uherské Hradiště
- First mentioned: 1372

Area
  - Total: 7.75 km^{2} (2.99 sq mi)
- Elevation: 203 m (666 ft)

Population (2026-01-01)
  - Total: 958
  - Density: 124/km^{2} (320/sq mi)
- Time zone: UTC+1 (CET)
  - Summer (DST): UTC+2 (CEST)
- Postal code: 687 03
- Website: www.kudlovice.cz

Kudlovice is a municipality and village in Uherské Hradiště District in the Zlín Region of the Czech Republic. It has about 1,000 inhabitants.

Kudlovice lies approximately 8 kilometres (5 mi) north of Uherské Hradiště, 19 km (12 mi) south-west of Zlín, and 243 km (151 mi) south-east of Prague.

== Demographics ==
Historical population
Year	Pop.	±%
1869	639	—
1880	687	+7.5%
1890	711	+3.5%
1900	804	+13.1%
1910	782	−2.7%
1921	918	+17.4%
1930	855	−6.9%
1950	936	+9.5%
1961	976	+4.3%
1970	939	−3.8%
1980	913	−2.8%
1991	852	−6.7%
2001	858	+0.7%
2011	907	+5.7%
2021	933	+2.9%
Source: Censuses
