= Zlechov =

- Municipality
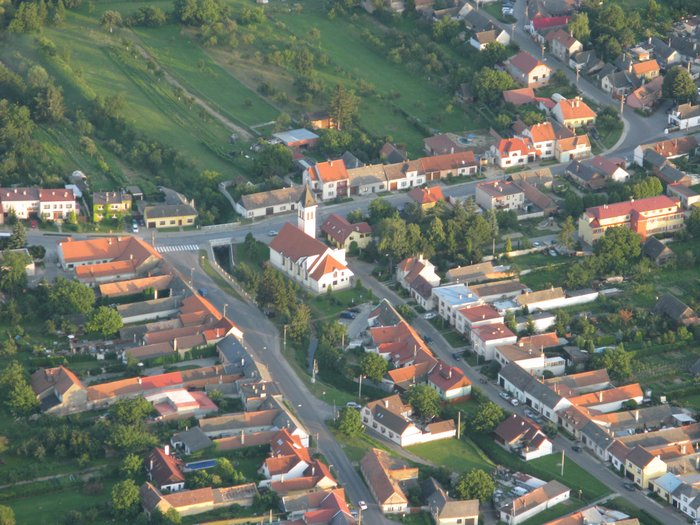
- Aerial view of Zlechov

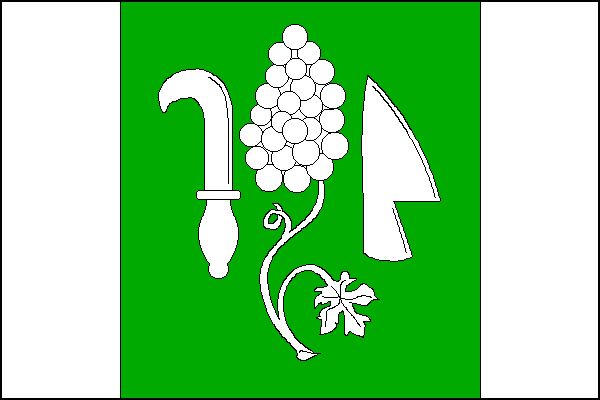
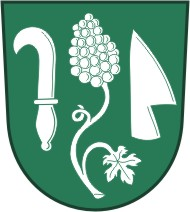
- Flag Coat of arms

- Location in the Czech Republic
- Coordinates: 49°4′26″N 17°22′46″E
- Country: Czech Republic
- Region: Zlín
- District: Uherské Hradiště
- First mentioned: 1207

Area
  - Total: 6.52 km^{2} (2.52 sq mi)
- Elevation: 208 m (682 ft)

Population (2026-01-01)
  - Total: 1,607
  - Density: 246/km^{2} (638/sq mi)
- Time zone: UTC+1 (CET)
  - Summer (DST): UTC+2 (CEST)
- Postal code: 687 10
- Website: www.obeczlechov.cz

Zlechov is a municipality and village in Uherské Hradiště District in the Zlín Region of the Czech Republic. It has about 1,600 inhabitants.

Zlechov lies approximately 6 kilometres (4 mi) west of Uherské Hradiště, 28 km (17 mi) south-west of Zlín, and 242 km (150 mi) south-east of Prague.

== Demographics ==
Historical population
Year	Pop.	±%
1869	845	—
1880	963	+14.0%
1890	1,053	+9.3%
1900	1,276	+21.2%
1910	1,380	+8.2%
1921	1,352	−2.0%
1930	1,256	−7.1%
1950	1,385	+10.3%
1961	1,684	+21.6%
1970	1,708	+1.4%
1980	1,625	−4.9%
1991	1,612	−0.8%
2001	1,572	−2.5%
2011	1,654	+5.2%
2021	1,587	−4.1%
Source: Censuses
