= Hostějov =

- Municipality
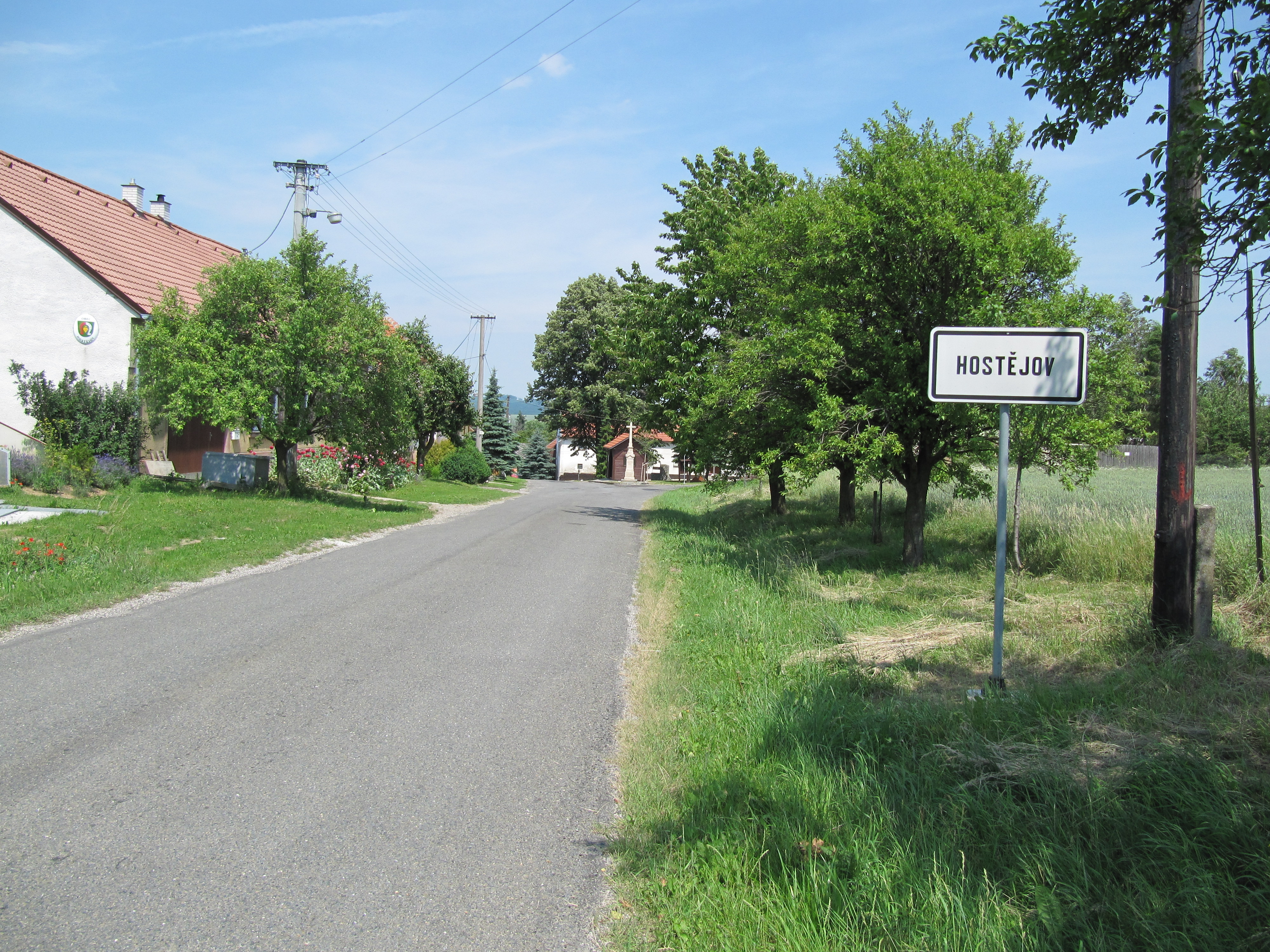
- View towards the centre of Hostějov

- Flag Coat of arms

- Location in the Czech Republic
- Coordinates: 49°2′25″N 17°15′26″E
- Country: Czech Republic
- Region: Zlín
- District: Uherské Hradiště
- First mentioned: 1371

Area
  - Total: 0.94 km^{2} (0.36 sq mi)
- Elevation: 345 m (1,132 ft)

Population (2026-01-01)
  - Total: 42
  - Density: 45/km^{2} (120/sq mi)
- Time zone: UTC+1 (CET)
  - Summer (DST): UTC+2 (CEST)
- Postal code: 687 41
- Website: www.hostejov.cz

Hostějov is a municipality and village in Uherské Hradiště District in the Zlín Region of the Czech Republic. It has about 40 inhabitants.

Hostějov lies approximately 15 kilometres (9 mi) west of Uherské Hradiště, 37 km (23 mi) south-west of Zlín, and 236 km (147 mi) south-east of Prague.

== Demographics ==
Historical population
Year	Pop.	±%
1869	110	—
1880	112	+1.8%
1890	99	−11.6%
1900	98	−1.0%
1910	108	+10.2%
1921	112	+3.7%
1930	98	−12.5%
1950	98	+0.0%
1961	102	+4.1%
1970	99	−2.9%
1980	64	−35.4%
1991	53	−17.2%
2001	37	−30.2%
2011	30	−18.9%
2021	28	−6.7%
Source: Censuses
