= Zlámanec =

- Municipality
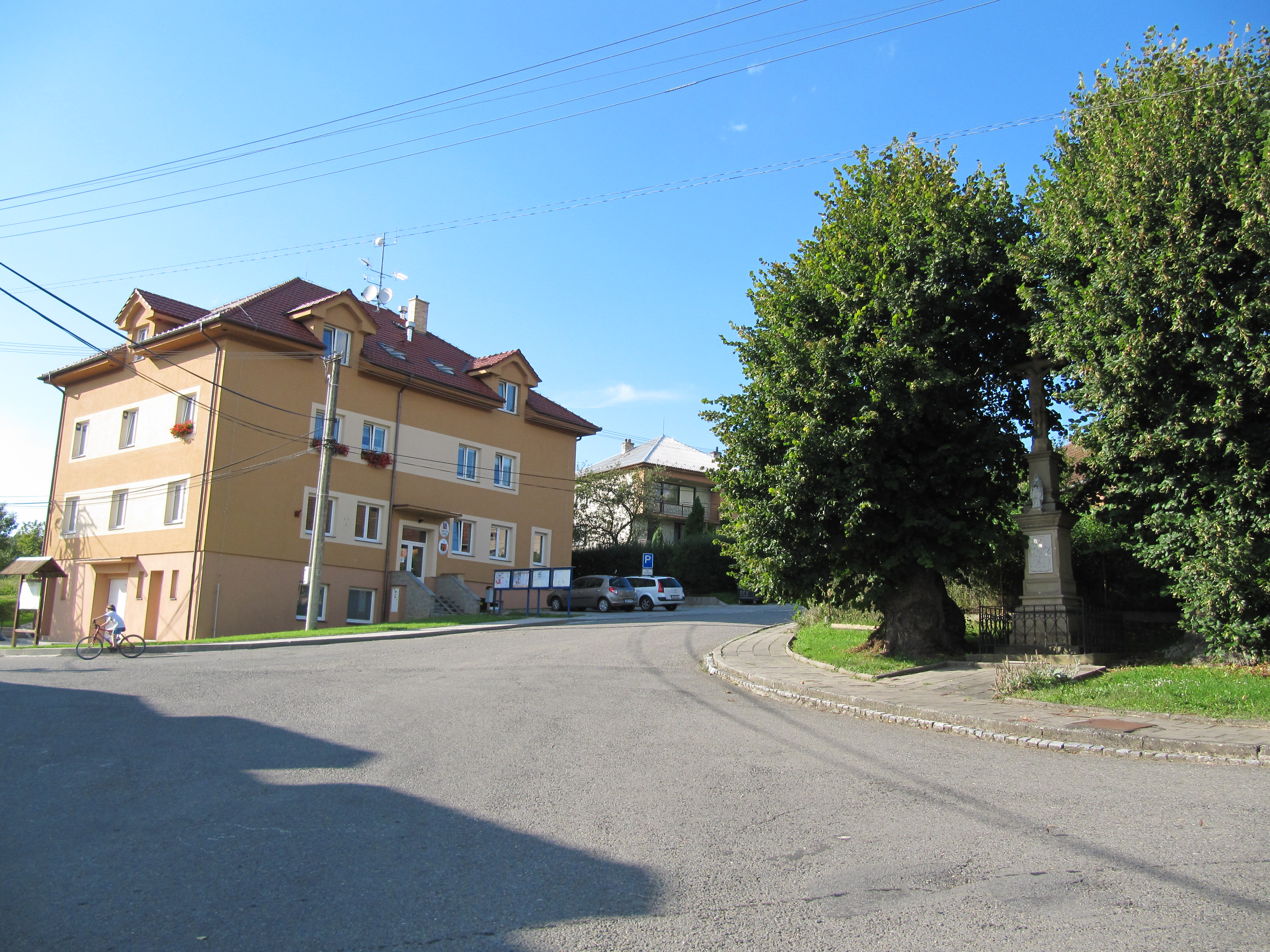
- Municipal office

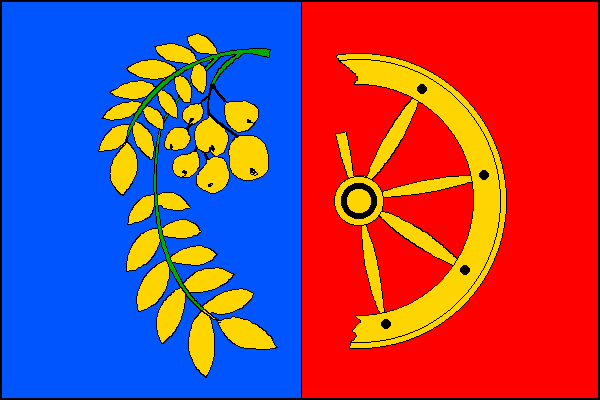
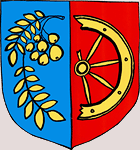
- Flag Coat of arms

- Location in the Czech Republic
- Coordinates: 49°7′47″N 17°37′42″E
- Country: Czech Republic
- Region: Zlín
- District: Uherské Hradiště
- First mentioned: 1392

Area
  - Total: 8.12 km^{2} (3.14 sq mi)
- Elevation: 254 m (833 ft)

Population (2026-01-01)
  - Total: 337
  - Density: 41.5/km^{2} (107/sq mi)
- Time zone: UTC+1 (CET)
  - Summer (DST): UTC+2 (CEST)
- Postal code: 687 12
- Website: www.zlamanec.cz

Zlámanec is a municipality and village in Uherské Hradiště District in the Zlín Region of the Czech Republic. It has about 300 inhabitants.

Zlámanec lies approximately 15 kilometres (9 mi) north-east of Uherské Hradiště, 12 km (7 mi) south of Zlín, and 255 km (158 mi) south-east of Prague.

== Demographics ==
Historical population
Year	Pop.	±%
1869	310	—
1880	368	+18.7%
1890	360	−2.2%
1900	363	+0.8%
1910	385	+6.1%
1921	412	+7.0%
1930	425	+3.2%
1950	420	−1.2%
1961	468	+11.4%
1970	392	−16.2%
1980	335	−14.5%
1991	316	−5.7%
2001	307	−2.8%
2011	294	−4.2%
2021	321	+9.2%
Source: Censuses
