= Veletiny =

- Municipality
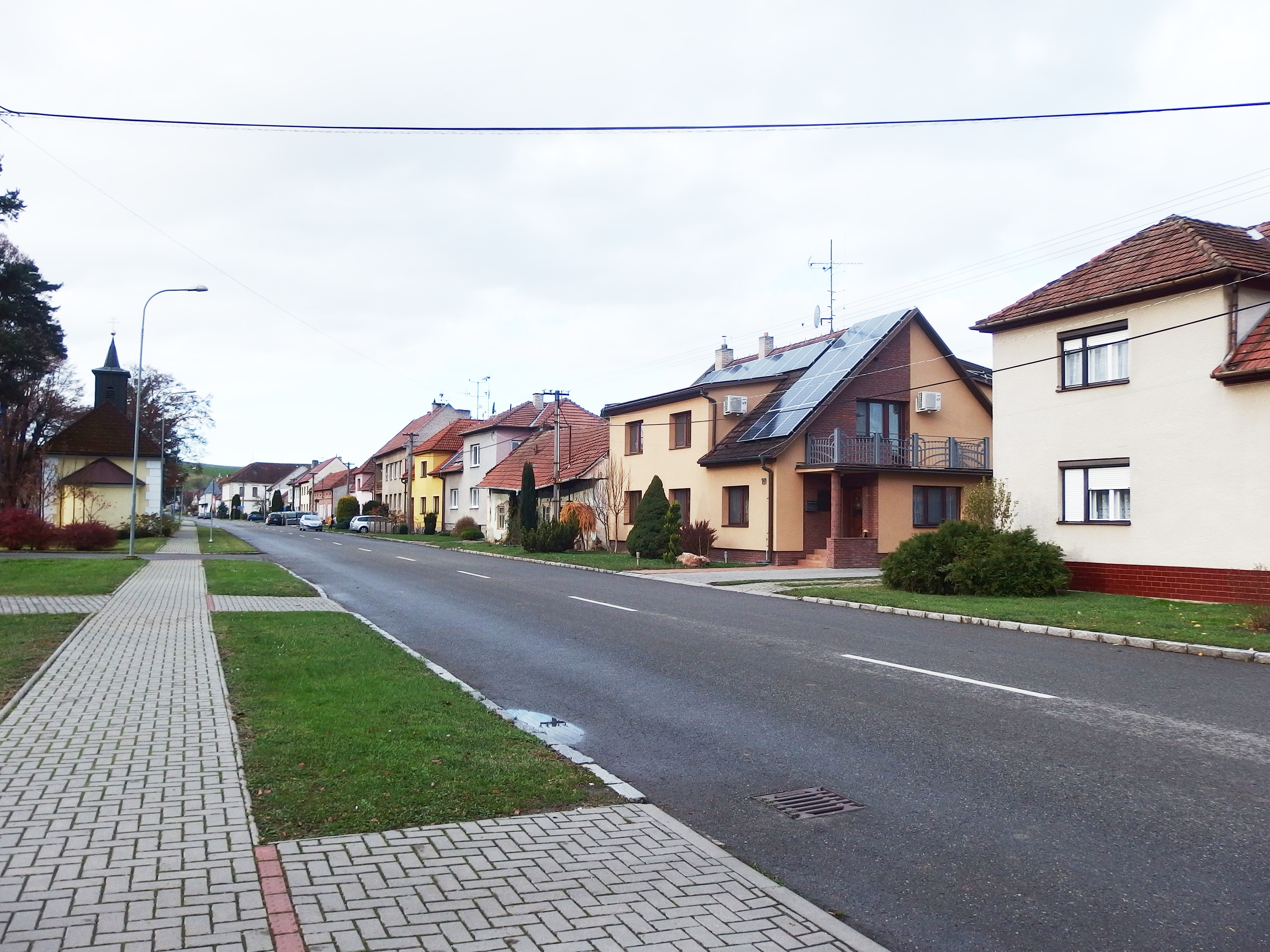
- Centre of Veletiny

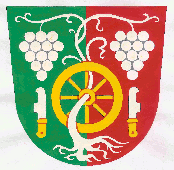
- Flag Coat of arms

- Location in the Czech Republic
- Coordinates: 49°2′13″N 17°33′45″E
- Country: Czech Republic
- Region: Zlín
- District: Uherské Hradiště
- First mentioned: 1201

Area
  - Total: 6.26 km^{2} (2.42 sq mi)
- Elevation: 199 m (653 ft)

Population (2026-01-01)
  - Total: 543
  - Density: 86.7/km^{2} (225/sq mi)
- Time zone: UTC+1 (CET)
  - Summer (DST): UTC+2 (CEST)
- Postal code: 687 33
- Website: www.veletiny.cz

Veletiny is a municipality and village in Uherské Hradiště District in the Zlín Region of the Czech Republic. It has about 500 inhabitants.

Veletiny lies approximately 9 kilometres (6 mi) south-east of Uherské Hradiště, 24 km (15 mi) south of Zlín, and 256 km (159 mi) south-east of Prague.

== Demographics ==
Historical population
| Year | Pop. | ±% |
|---|---|---|
| 1869 | 370 | — |
| 1880 | 403 | +8.9% |
| 1890 | 456 | +13.2% |
| 1900 | 477 | +4.6% |
| 1910 | 568 | +19.1% |
| 1921 | 601 | +5.8% |
| 1930 | 609 | +1.3% |
| 1950 | 622 | +2.1% |
| 1961 | 691 | +11.1% |
| 1970 | 676 | −2.2% |
| 1980 | 639 | −5.5% |
| 1991 | 559 | −12.5% |
| 2001 | 569 | +1.8% |
| 2011 | 552 | −3.0% |
| 2021 | 522 | −5.4% |
Source: Censuses

== Sights ==
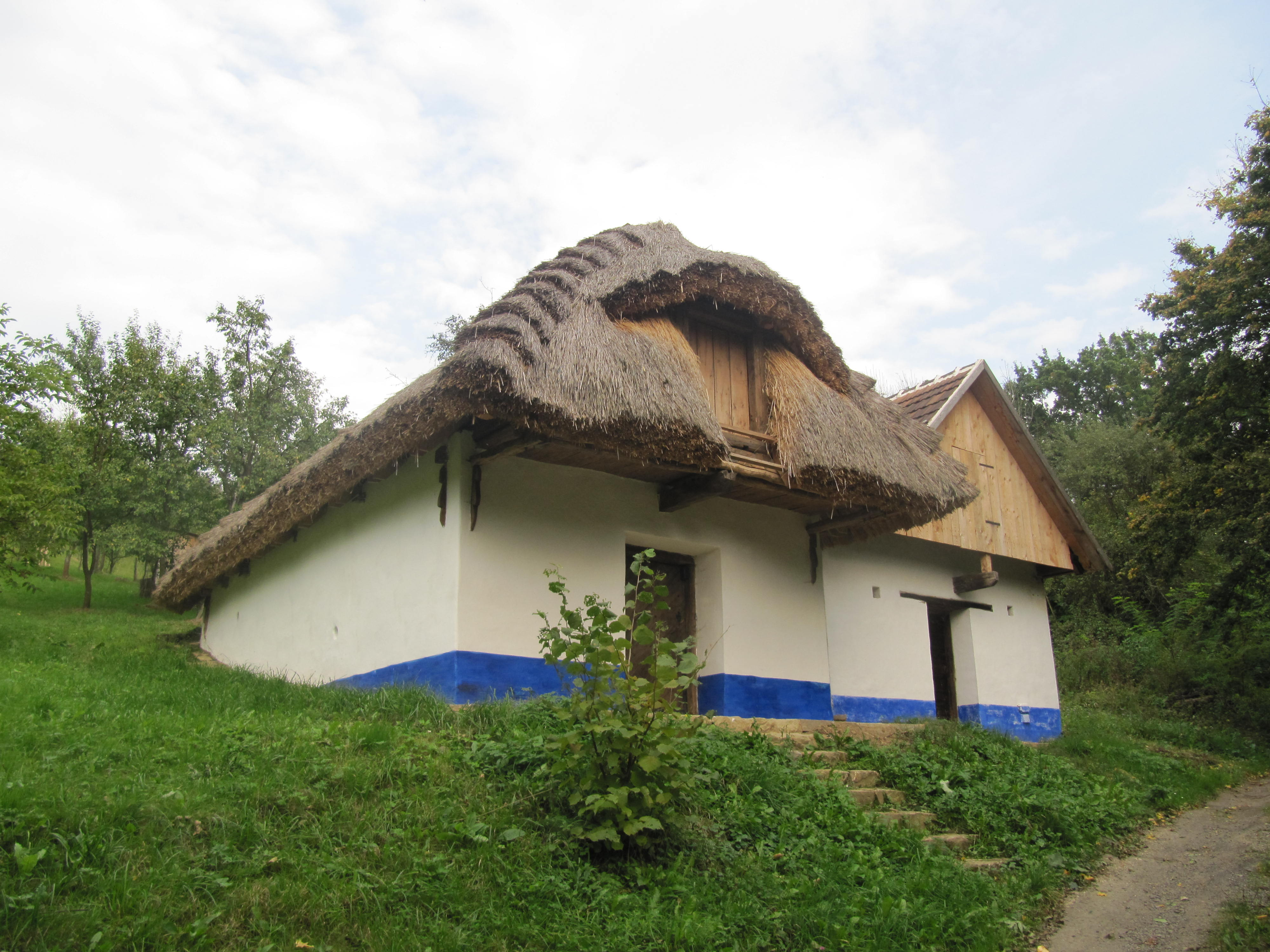
Búdy in Veletiny

A locality called Veletiny-Stará hora is known for the vineyard buildings of folk architecture – búdy, which are above-ground cellars and presses. The area is protected as a village monument reservation.
