= Svárov (Uherské Hradiště District) =

- Municipality
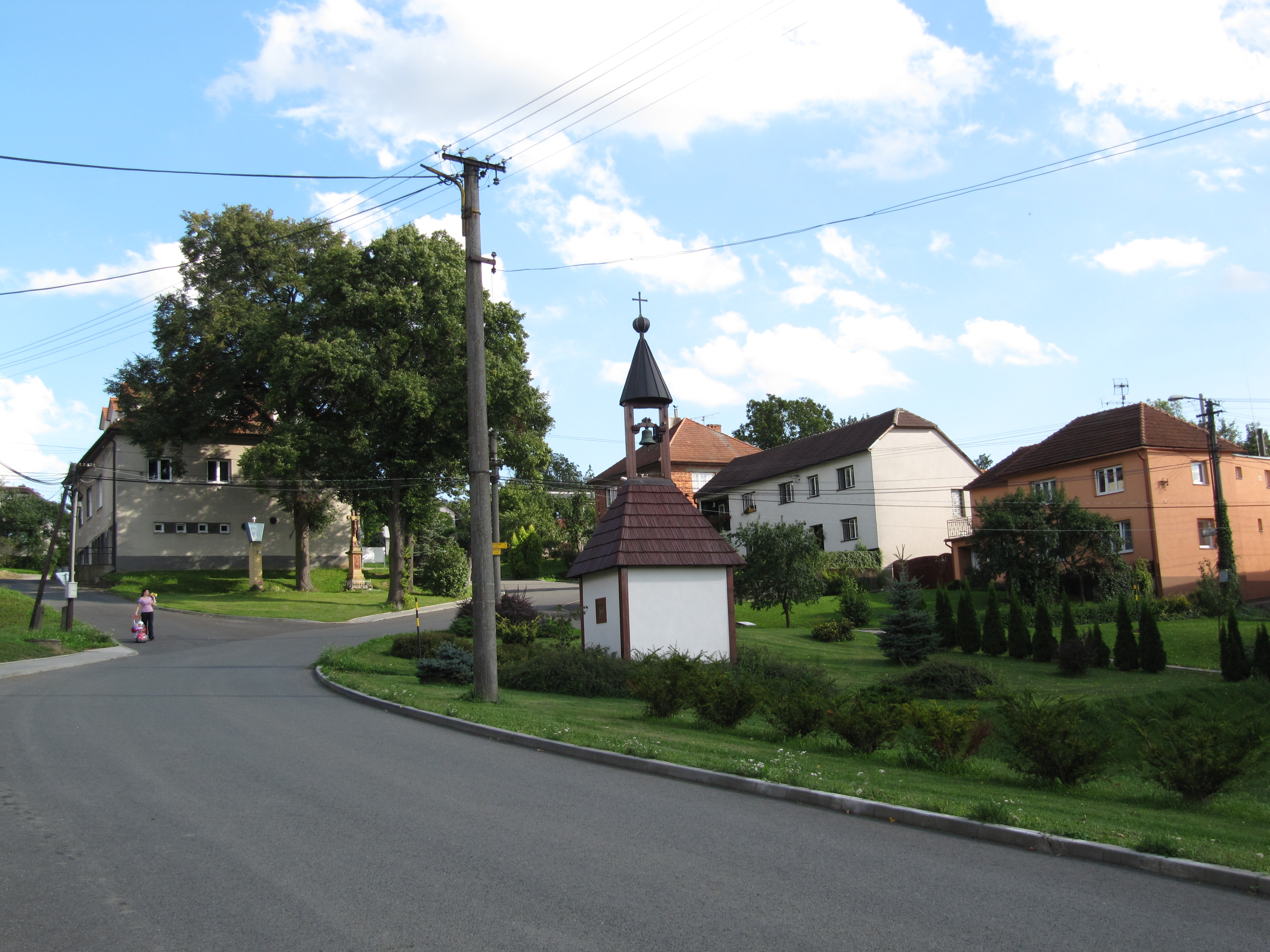
- Chapel of the Visitation of the Virgin Mary

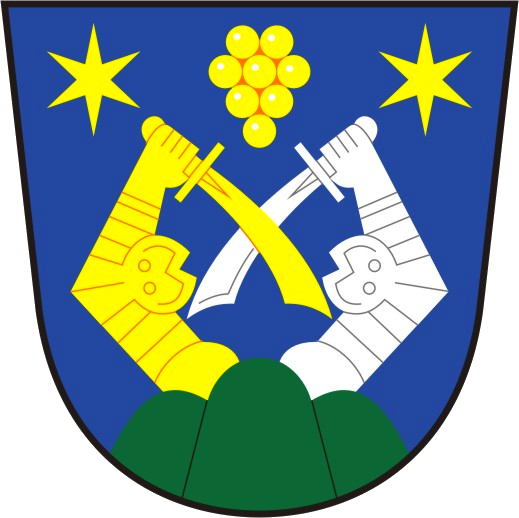
- Flag Coat of arms

- Location in the Czech Republic
- Coordinates: 49°6′59″N 17°37′28″E
- Country: Czech Republic
- Region: Zlín
- District: Uherské Hradiště
- First mentioned: 1375

Area
  - Total: 1.91 km^{2} (0.74 sq mi)
- Elevation: 290 m (950 ft)

Population (2026-01-01)
  - Total: 230
  - Density: 120/km^{2} (310/sq mi)
- Time zone: UTC+1 (CET)
  - Summer (DST): UTC+2 (CEST)
- Postal code: 687 12
- Website: obecsvarov.cz

Svárov is a municipality and village in Uherské Hradiště District in the Zlín Region of the Czech Republic. It has about 200 inhabitants.

Svárov lies approximately 14 kilometres (9 mi) north-east of Uherské Hradiště, 14 km (9 mi) south of Zlín, and 255 km (158 mi) south-east of Prague.

== Demographics ==
Historical population
Year	Pop.	±%
1869	218	—
1880	223	+2.3%
1890	233	+4.5%
1900	277	+18.9%
1910	294	+6.1%
1921	334	+13.6%
1930	278	−16.8%
1950	317	+14.0%
1961	359	+13.2%
1970	332	−7.5%
1980	287	−13.6%
1991	245	−14.6%
2001	255	+4.1%
2011	246	−3.5%
2021	217	−11.8%
Source: Censuses
