= Medlovice (Uherské Hradiště District) =

- Municipality
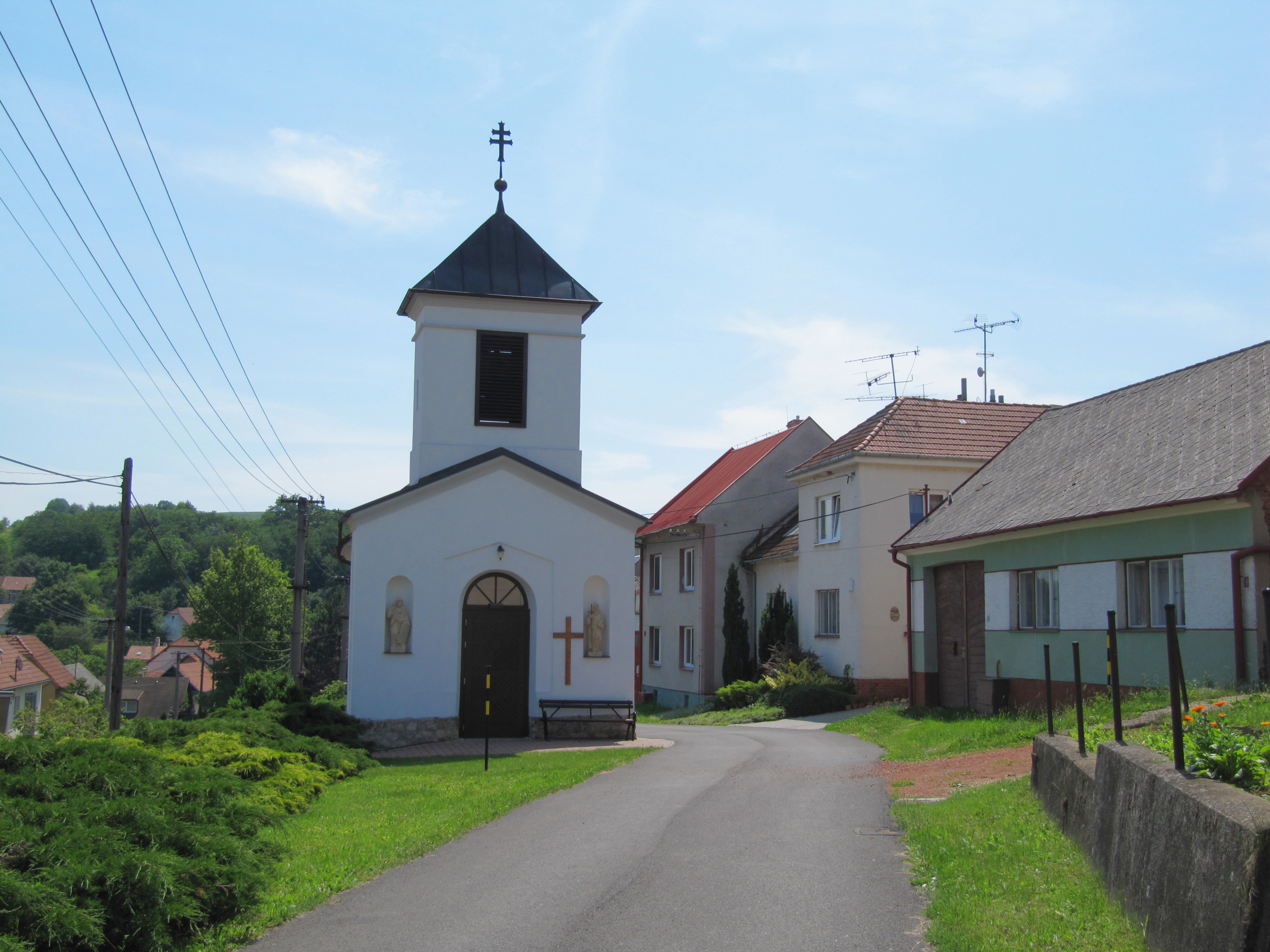
- Chapel of the Visitation of the Virgin Mary

- Flag Coat of arms

- Location in the Czech Republic
- Coordinates: 49°2′57″N 17°16′18″E
- Country: Czech Republic
- Region: Zlín
- District: Uherské Hradiště
- First mentioned: 1351

Area
  - Total: 2.92 km^{2} (1.13 sq mi)
- Elevation: 320 m (1,050 ft)

Population (2026-01-01)
  - Total: 440
  - Density: 150/km^{2} (390/sq mi)
- Time zone: UTC+1 (CET)
  - Summer (DST): UTC+2 (CEST)
- Postal code: 687 41
- Website: www.obecmedlovice.cz

Medlovice is a municipality and village in Uherské Hradiště District in the Zlín Region of the Czech Republic. It has about 400 inhabitants.

Medlovice lies approximately 14 kilometres (9 mi) west of Uherské Hradiště, 35 km (22 mi) south-west of Zlín, and 236 km (147 mi) south-east of Prague.

== Demographics ==
Historical population
Year	Pop.	±%
1869	342	—
1880	381	+11.4%
1890	401	+5.2%
1900	404	+0.7%
1910	436	+7.9%
1921	456	+4.6%
1930	384	−15.8%
1950	426	+10.9%
1961	492	+15.5%
1970	471	−4.3%
1980	462	−1.9%
1991	453	−1.9%
2001	475	+4.9%
2011	460	−3.2%
2021	446	−3.0%
Source: Censuses
