= Částkov (Uherské Hradiště District) =

- Municipality
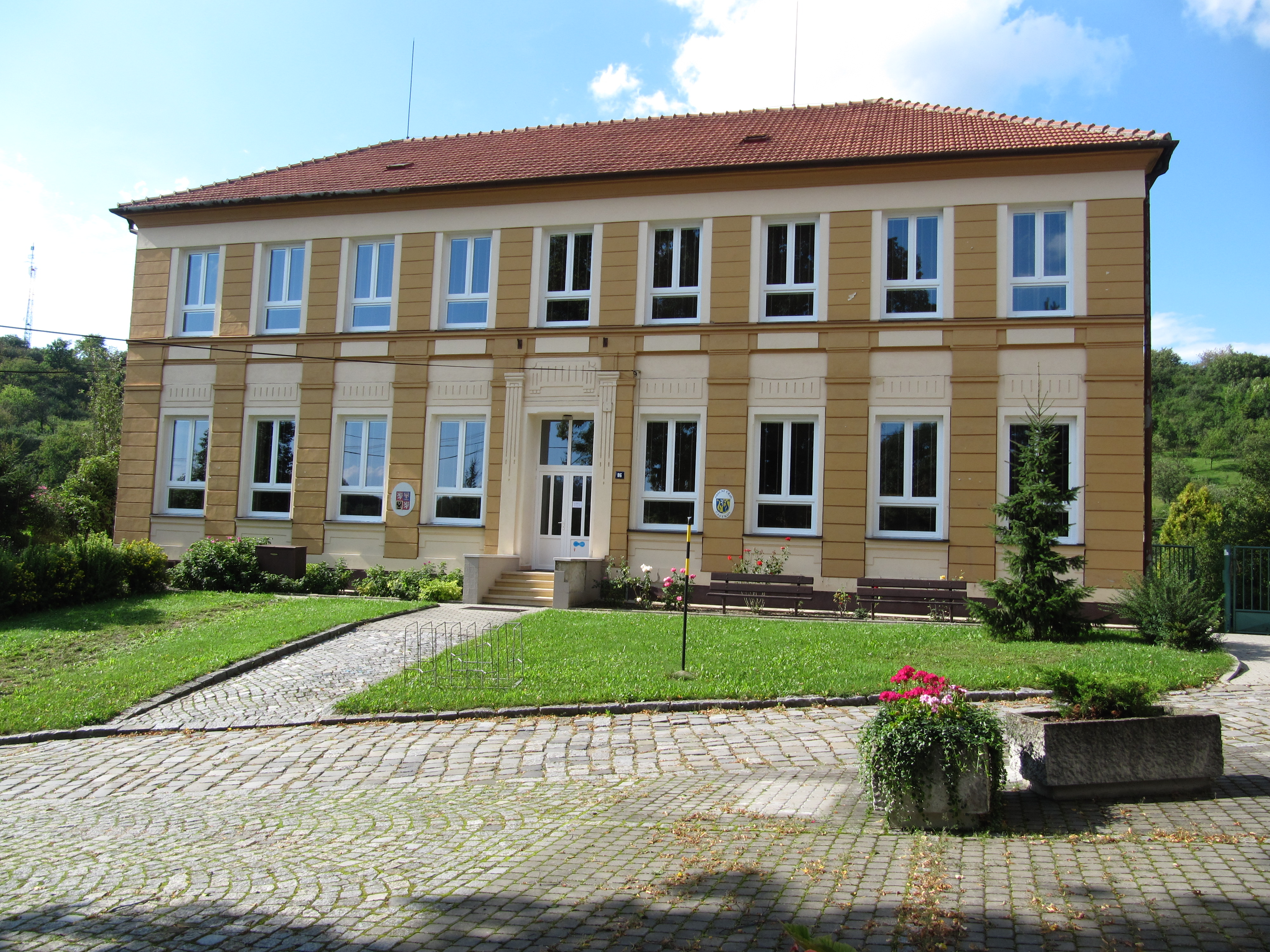
- Municipal office

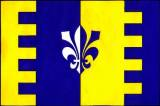
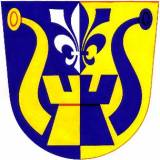
- Flag Coat of arms

- Location in the Czech Republic
- Coordinates: 49°6′16″N 17°37′11″E
- Country: Czech Republic
- Region: Zlín
- District: Uherské Hradiště
- First mentioned: 1321

Area
  - Total: 6.59 km^{2} (2.54 sq mi)
- Elevation: 222 m (728 ft)

Population (2026-01-01)
  - Total: 374
  - Density: 56.8/km^{2} (147/sq mi)
- Time zone: UTC+1 (CET)
  - Summer (DST): UTC+2 (CEST)
- Postal code: 687 12
- Website: www.castkovuh.cz

Částkov is a municipality and village in Uherské Hradiště District in the Zlín Region of the Czech Republic. It has about 400 inhabitants.

Částkov lies approximately 13 kilometres (8 mi) east of Uherské Hradiště, 15 km (9 mi) south of Zlín, and 256 km (159 mi) south-east of Prague.

== Demographics ==
Historical population
Year	Pop.	±%
1869	362	—
1880	379	+4.7%
1890	383	+1.1%
1900	416	+8.6%
1910	452	+8.7%
1921	451	−0.2%
1930	546	+21.1%
1950	549	+0.5%
1961	544	−0.9%
1970	505	−7.2%
1980	469	−7.1%
1991	407	−13.2%
2001	383	−5.9%
2011	369	−3.7%
2021	366	−0.8%
Source: Censuses
