= Vápenice (Uherské Hradiště District) =

- Municipality
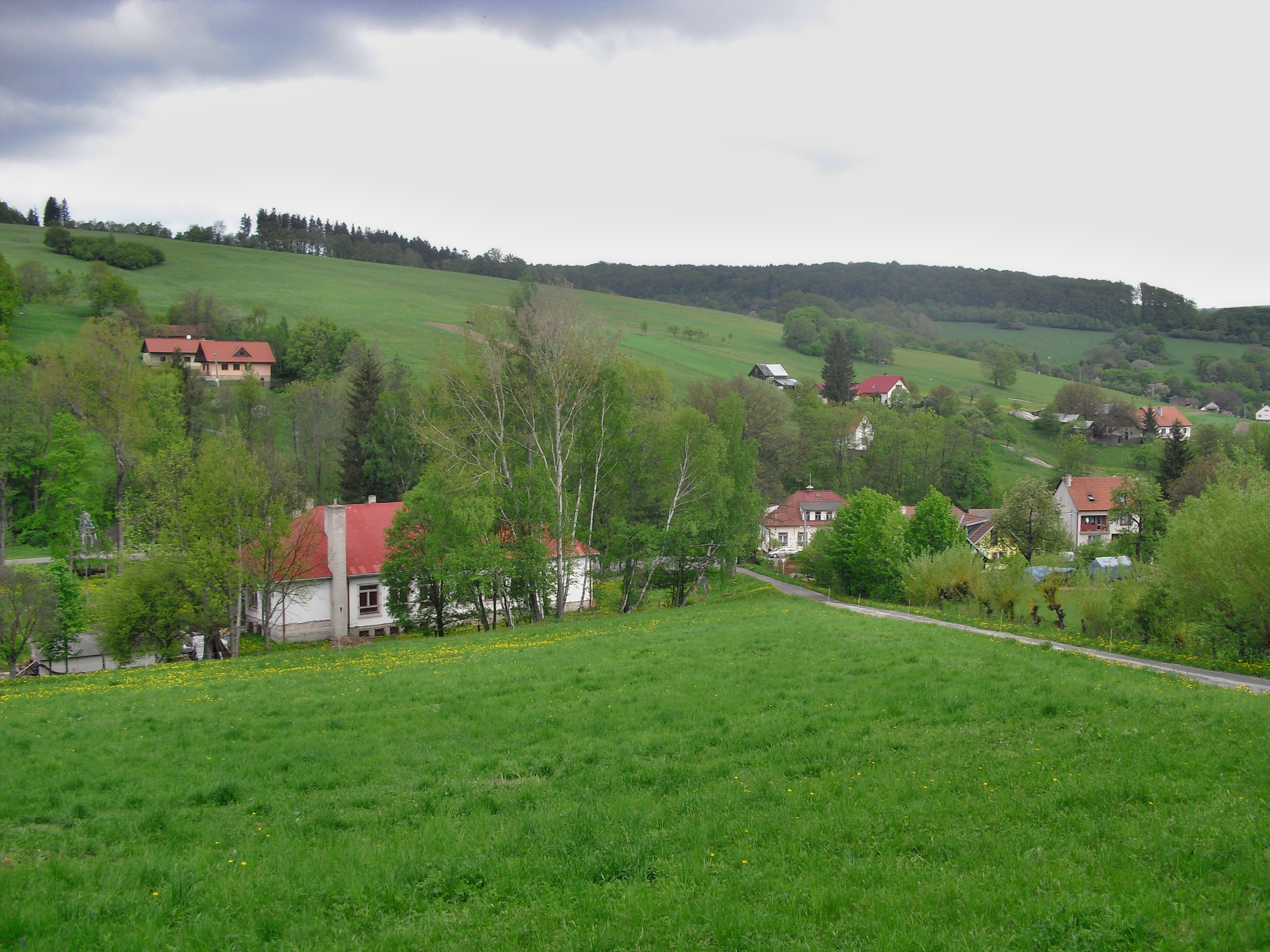
- Central part of Vápenice

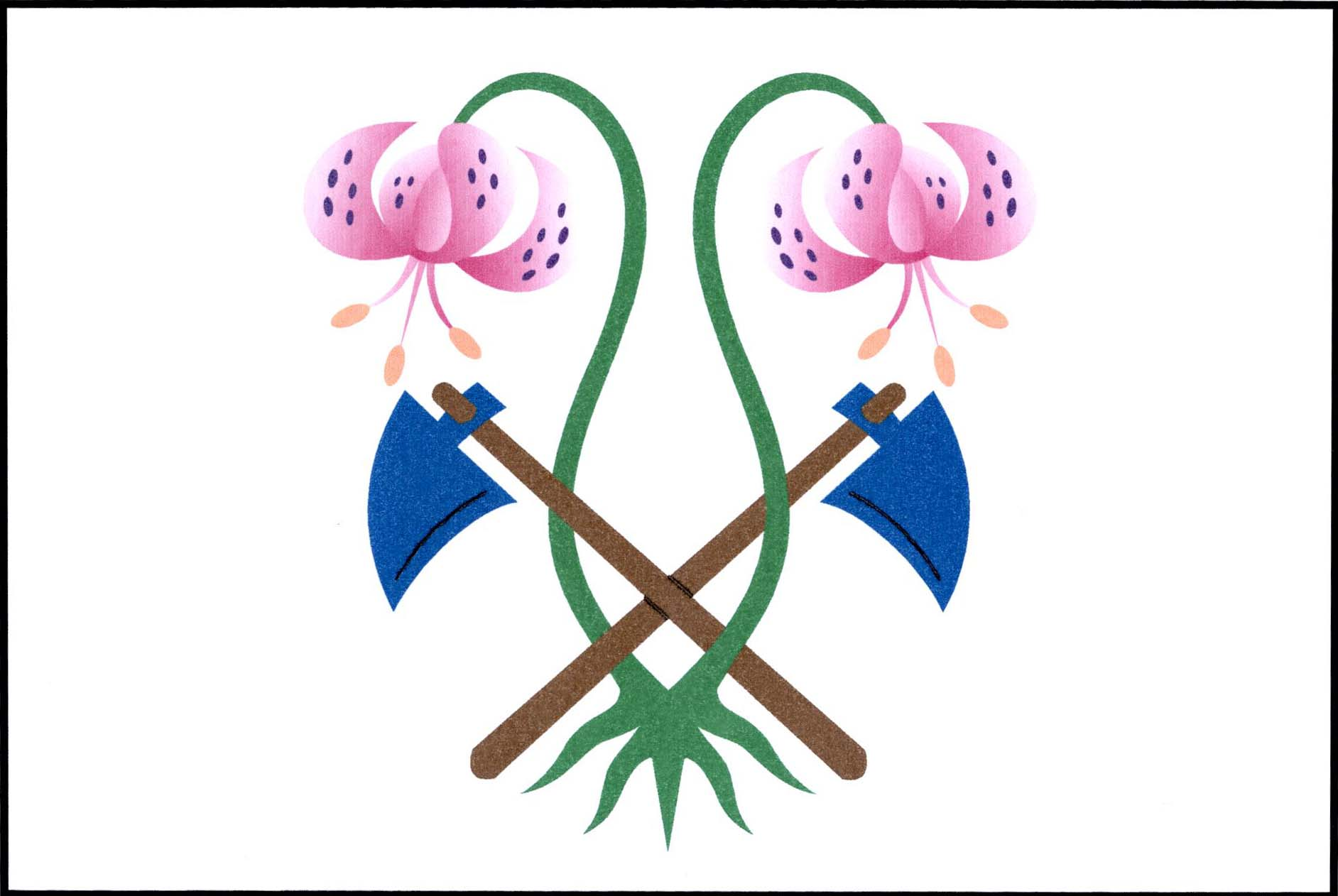
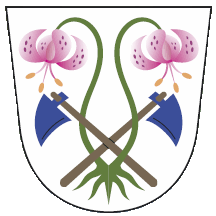
- Flag Coat of arms

- Location in the Czech Republic
- Coordinates: 48°58′4″N 17°50′28″E
- Country: Czech Republic
- Region: Zlín
- District: Uherské Hradiště
- First mentioned: 1750

Area
  - Total: 9.88 km^{2} (3.81 sq mi)
- Elevation: 460 m (1,510 ft)

Population (2026-01-01)
  - Total: 189
  - Density: 19.1/km^{2} (49.5/sq mi)
- Time zone: UTC+1 (CET)
  - Summer (DST): UTC+2 (CEST)
- Postal code: 687 74
- Website: www.vapenice.cz

Vápenice is a municipality and village in Uherské Hradiště District in the Zlín Region of the Czech Republic. It has about 200 inhabitants.

Vápenice lies approximately 30 kilometres (19 mi) south-east of Uherské Hradiště, 34 km (21 mi) south of Zlín, and 277 km (172 mi) south-east of Prague.

== Demographics ==
Historical population
Year	Pop.	±%
1869	292	—
1880	324	+11.0%
1890	369	+13.9%
1900	379	+2.7%
1910	409	+7.9%
1921	415	+1.5%
1930	399	−3.9%
1950	344	−13.8%
1961	568	+65.1%
1970	452	−20.4%
1980	313	−30.8%
1991	222	−29.1%
2001	197	−11.3%
2011	179	−9.1%
2021	183	+2.2%
Source: Censuses
