= Stříbrnice (Uherské Hradiště District) =

- Municipality
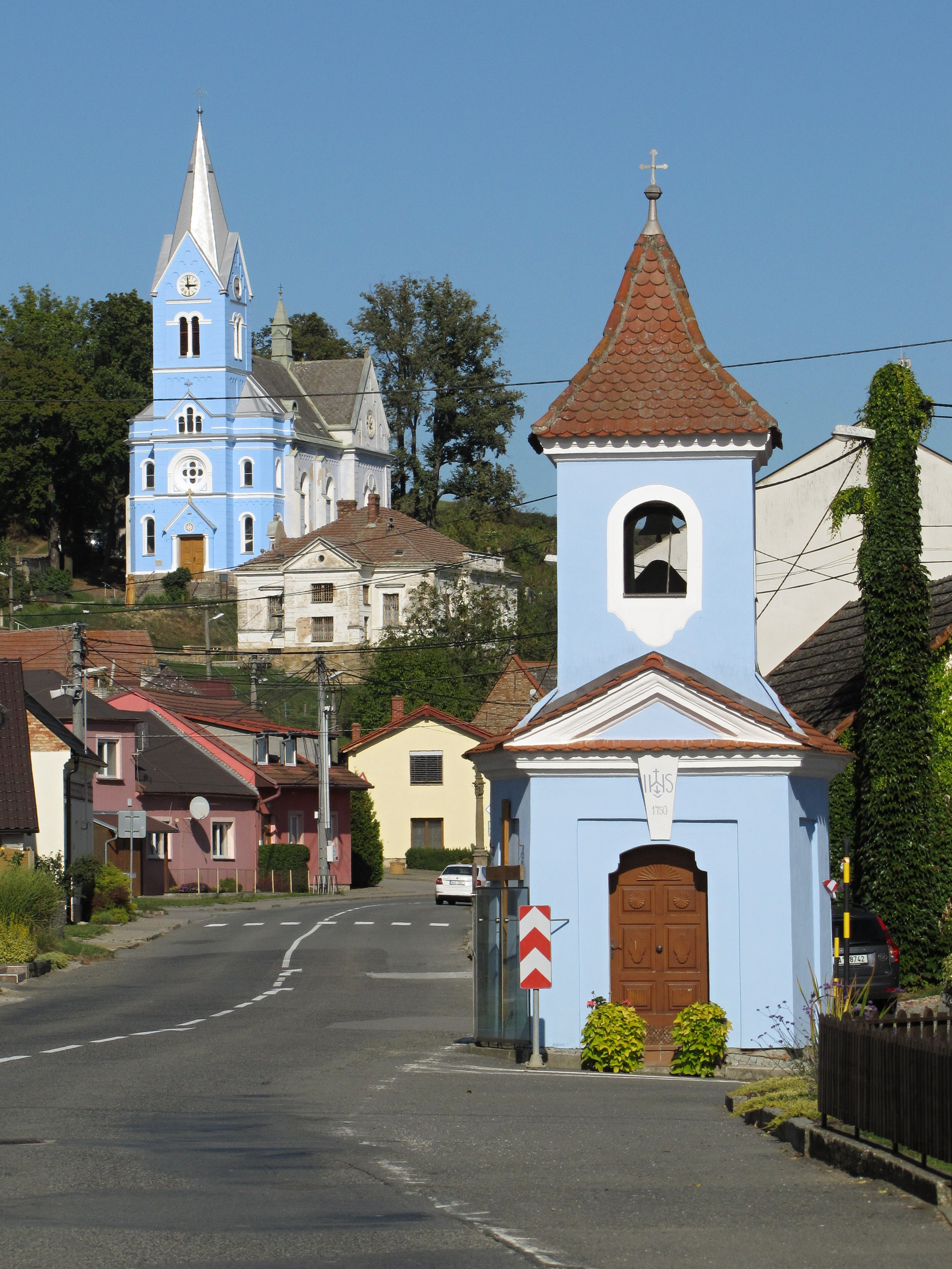
- Chapel of Saint Procopius and Church of Saint Procopius

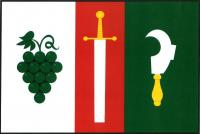
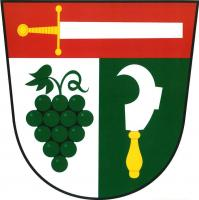
- Flag Coat of arms

- Location in the Czech Republic
- Coordinates: 49°3′24″N 17°18′27″E
- Country: Czech Republic
- Region: Zlín
- District: Uherské Hradiště
- First mentioned: 1141

Area
  - Total: 6.07 km^{2} (2.34 sq mi)
- Elevation: 240 m (790 ft)

Population (2026-01-01)
  - Total: 442
  - Density: 72.8/km^{2} (189/sq mi)
- Time zone: UTC+1 (CET)
  - Summer (DST): UTC+2 (CEST)
- Postal code: 687 09
- Website: www.stribrnice.cz

Stříbrnice is a municipality and village in Uherské Hradiště District in the Zlín Region of the Czech Republic. It has about 400 inhabitants.

Stříbrnice lies approximately 12 kilometres (7 mi) west of Uherské Hradiště, 33 km (21 mi) south-west of Zlín, and 238 km (148 mi) south-east of Prague.

== Demographics ==
Historical population
Year	Pop.	±%
1869	834	—
1880	856	+2.6%
1890	866	+1.2%
1900	990	+14.3%
1910	1,000	+1.0%
1921	1,056	+5.6%
1930	923	−12.6%
1950	830	−10.1%
1961	870	+4.8%
1970	711	−18.3%
1980	515	−27.6%
1991	397	−22.9%
2001	413	+4.0%
2011	418	+1.2%
2021	396	−5.3%
Source: Censuses
