= Velička (river) =

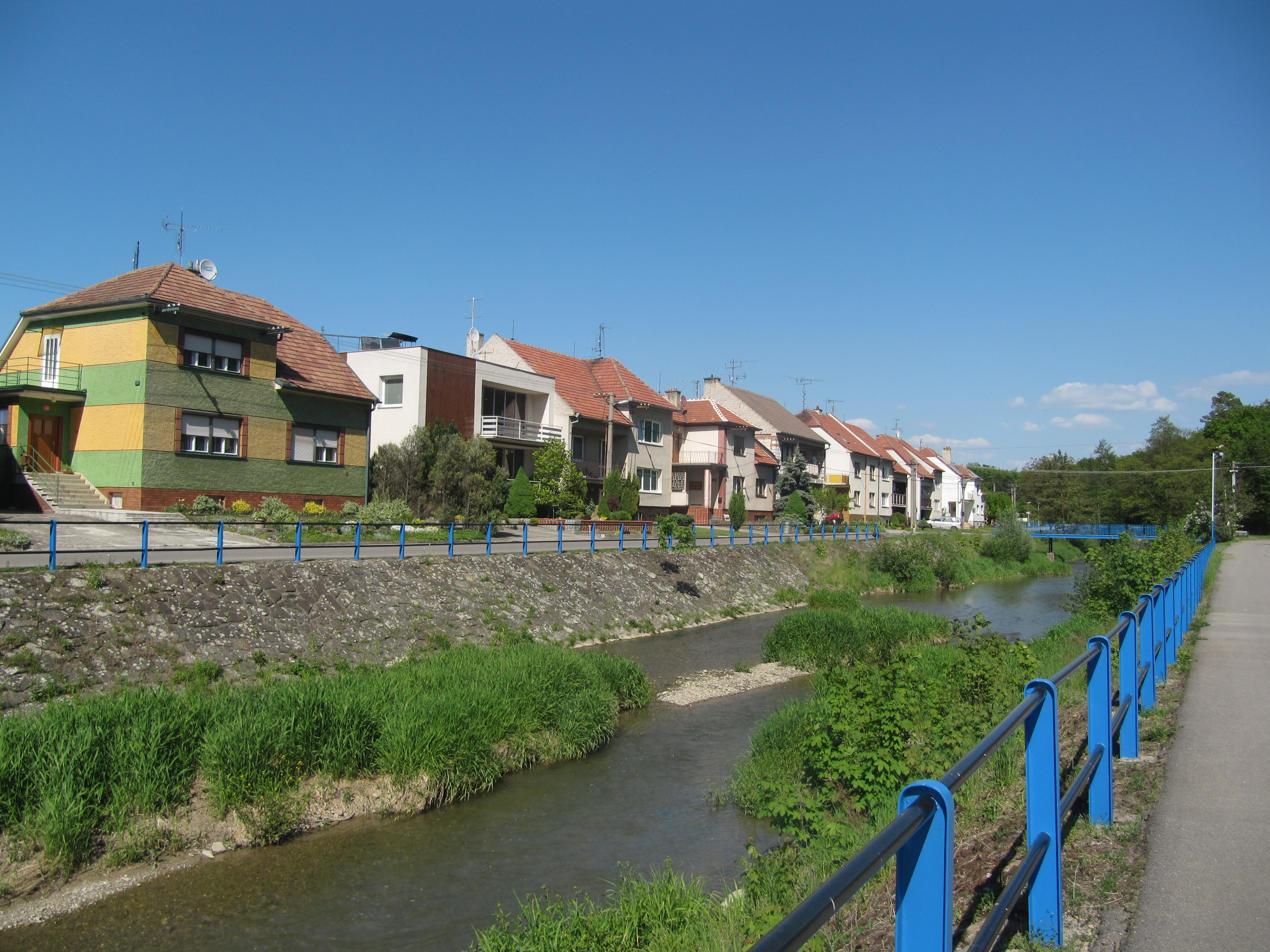
- The Velička in Lipov

Location
- Country: Czech Republic
- Regions: South Moravian; Zlín

Physical characteristics
- Source
  - location: Strání, White Carpathians
  - coordinates: 48°51′28″N 17°40′20″E
  - elevation: 921 m (3,022 ft)
- Mouth
  - location: Morava
  - coordinates: 48°54′30″N 17°16′12″E
  - elevation: 161 m (528 ft)
- Length: 40.2 km (25.0 mi)
- Basin size: 184.7 km^{2} (71.3 sq mi)
- Discharge
  - average: 0.98 m^{3}/s (35 cu ft/s) near estuary

Basin features
- Progression: Morava→ Danube→ Black Sea

The Velička is a river in the Czech Republic, a left tributary of the Morava River. It flows through the South Moravian and Zlín regions. It is 40.2 km (25.0 mi) long.

== Etymology ==
The river was named after the village of Velká nad Veličkou (formerly called just Velká).

== Characteristic ==
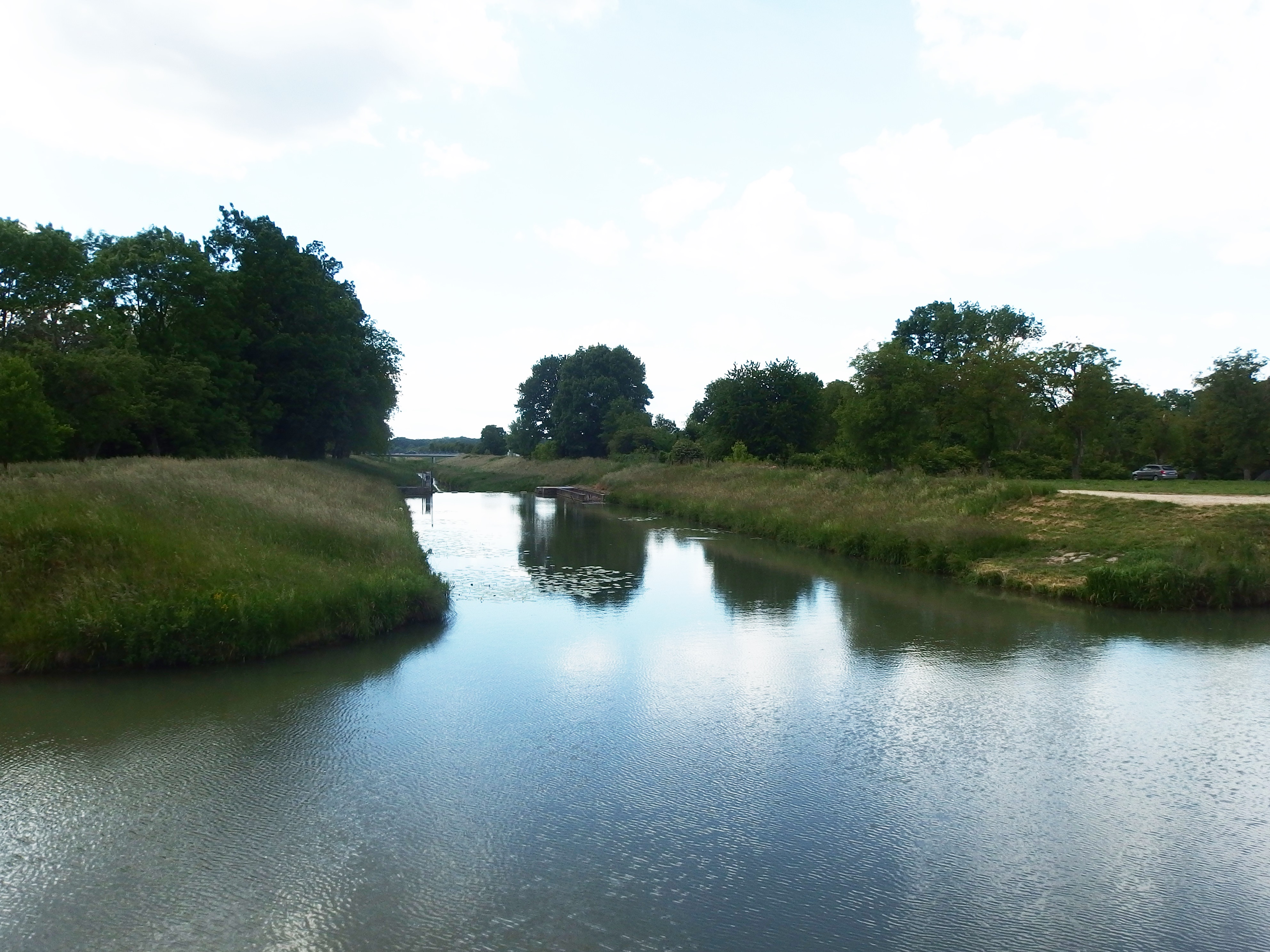
Crossing of the Velička and Baťa Canal in Strážnice

The Velička originates in the territory of Strání in the White Carpathians mountain range on the slope of the Velká Javořina Mountain at an elevation of 921 m (3,022 ft) and flows to Vracov, where it enters the Morava River at an elevation of 161 m (528 ft). It is 40.2 km (25.0 mi) long. Its drainage basin has an area of 184.7 km^{2} (71.3 sq mi). The average discharge at its mouth is 0.98 m^{3}/s (35 cu ft/s).

The longest tributaries of the Velička are:

Tributary	Length (km)	River km	Side
Kozojídka	9.3	8.4	right
Kuželovský potok	9.0	12.6	left
Trávníkový potok	8.7	7.1	left
Kazivec	8.3	31.4	right

== Course ==
The river flows through the municipal territories of Strání, Nová Lhota, Suchov, Javorník, Velká nad Veličkou, Louka, Lipov, Tasov, Hroznová Lhota, Kněždub, Vnorovy, Strážnice and Vracov.

== Bodies of water ==
There are 31 bodies of water in the basin area. None of them exceed 0.4 ha (1 acre) in area.

== Nature ==
The upper course of the Velička flows through the Bílé Karpaty Protected Landscape Area. In addition, the spring is located in the specially protected area of Javorina National Nature Reserve. Between Suchov and Javorník, the river flows through the Jazevčí National Nature Reserve.

== See also ==
- List of rivers of the Czech Republic
