= Horňácko =

Coordinates: 48°52′57″N 17°31′14″E

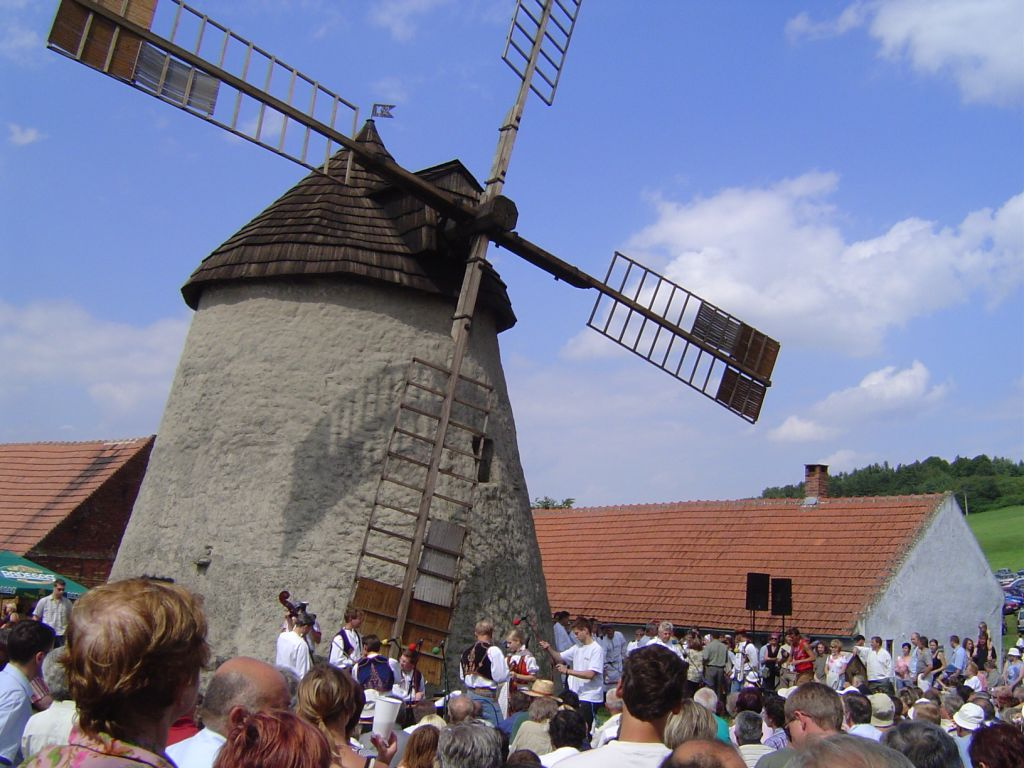
Windmill in Kuželov during the Horňácko Folk Festival

Horňácko (pronounced [ˈɦorɲaːtsko], Upper Moravian Slovakia) is an ethnographic microregion situated in the Hodonín District, South Eastern Moravia, Czech Republic. The region is home to approximately 10,000 people. It is significant for its traditional folk culture, especially the folk music. The region hosts annually the Horňácko Folk Festival.

== Geography ==
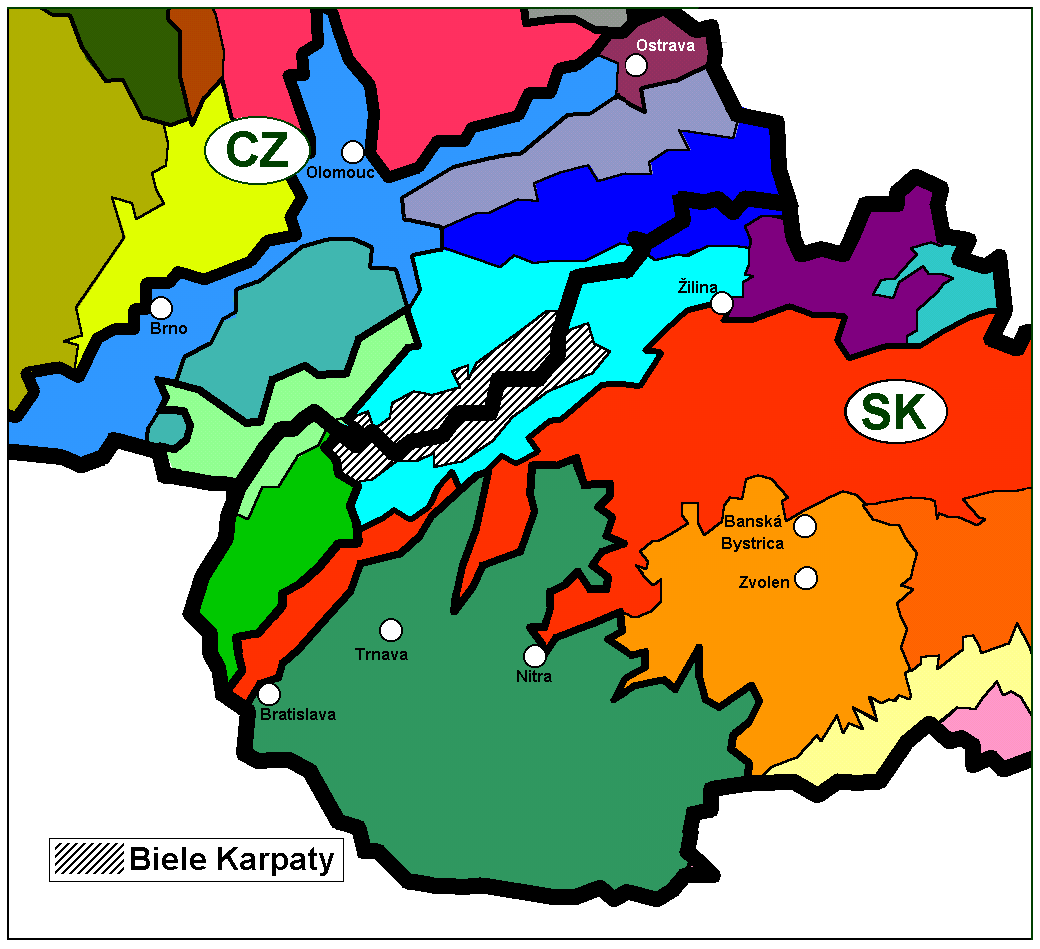
White Carpathians within the geomorphological division of Slovakia and the Czech Republic

Microregion Horňácko is located in the northwest foothills of the southern part of the White Carpathians, close to the border with Slovakia. The highest peak of the region is Velká Javořina (970 m above sea level), a traditional place of meetings between Czechs and Slovaks. Horňácko consists of nine municipalities: Lipov, Louka, Malá Vrbka, Hrubá Vrbka, Javorník, Kuželov, Suchov and Nová Lhota (the village of Vápenky, a part of Nová Lhota, is sometimes considered as the tenth village of Horňácko); the centre of the area is the village Velká nad Veličkou. The highest located village is Nová Lhota, 467 m. above sea level; the lowest is Lipov, located at 240 m. above sea level. The climatic conditions are different from the nearby region of Moravian Slovakia, Horňácko is a subregion of Moravian Slovakia. the hilly and somewhat isolated landscape has influenced crafts, folk costume, arts, traditions, the development and distinctive regional character of the area. The extraordinarily well-preserved historical landscape of the Horňácko region was shaped by traditional ways of farming, by the natural diversity and historical development of the area, and by remoteness from industrial centers.

== History ==
The Horňácko region was already inhabited during the Neolithic era. There are no archaeological remains from the time, such as pottery, that indicate permanent settlement in the area, however, some stone tools and weapons have been discovered nearby Velká nad Veličkou. The 9th century is marked by the beginnings of a Slavic settlement in the area. The Slavs apparently settled in the valley between Lipov and Velká nad Veličkou, but the lack of findings and evidence precludes accurate dating of their arrival. The first written record about the area dates back to 1228. A part of the estates nearby Velká nad Veličkou was attributed to the monastery in Velehrad in a document confirmed by the Bohemian king Ottokar I.

In the early 15th century, some villages in the Horňácko region were heavily damaged or destroyed during the Hussite wars. The 16th century is marked by the emergence of new protestant churches, such as Lutherans. The colonization of the area in the late 16th century caused significant cultural and economic growth, however, conflicts and wars of the 17th century interrupted the promising development. The religious conflict between Protestants and Catholics during the Thirty Years' War influenced the composition and density of the population, as many followers of the Protestant religions were forced to flee to neighboring countries to escape recatholization. After the Thirty Years' War, 216 of 253 houses in Velká nad Veličkou were abandoned and empty.

Another disaster came in the second half of the 17th century, during a conflict between the Ottoman Empire and European powers. Turkish armies captured and burned the town of Velká nad Veličkou; the inhabitants were killed and raped; young boys were kidnapped as future Turkish spies. The bad situation in the area in the late 17th and 18th century worsened by epidemics of plague, military conflicts, and continuing Counter-Reformation. Moreover, the Napoleonic Wars and subsequent epidemic of cholera (1831) negatively affected further development of the region in the early 19th century. The 19th century is generally characterized by strong influence of the Slovak population on the opposite side of the border. In Horňácko, it is particularly apparent in dialects, folk customs, music and songs.

In the 20th century, during the Second World War, the Horňácko region became an important strategic area in the fight against the German invaders. At the end of the war, the border region around the White Carpathians became a place where many partisan groups were formed. Bishop Gorazd of Prague, executed by Nazis for his participation in the assassination of SS-Obergruppenfuhrer Reinhard Heydrich, was a native from Hrubá Vrbka.

== Traditional folk culture ==
=== Music ===
Horňácko is the only region in Moravia where the development of traditional music remained uninterrupted. The culture of the region is considered "to be among the purest and most well-preserved in the Czech Republic". Composer Leoš Janáček regarded Horňácko "the most important center of traditional folk music in Moravian Slovakia".

The early bagpipe music of Horňácko, an unusual element in the Moravian traditional music, was replaced by the string instruments in the second half of the 19th century. The initial line-up of a traditional band consisted only of violins (it was called "hudecká"). Other instruments, such as viola, clarinet, double bass and occasionally even brass instruments joined in the late 19th century. Cimbalom, a traditional part of today's Moravian folk ensemble, appeared in Horňácko only in the 1930s.

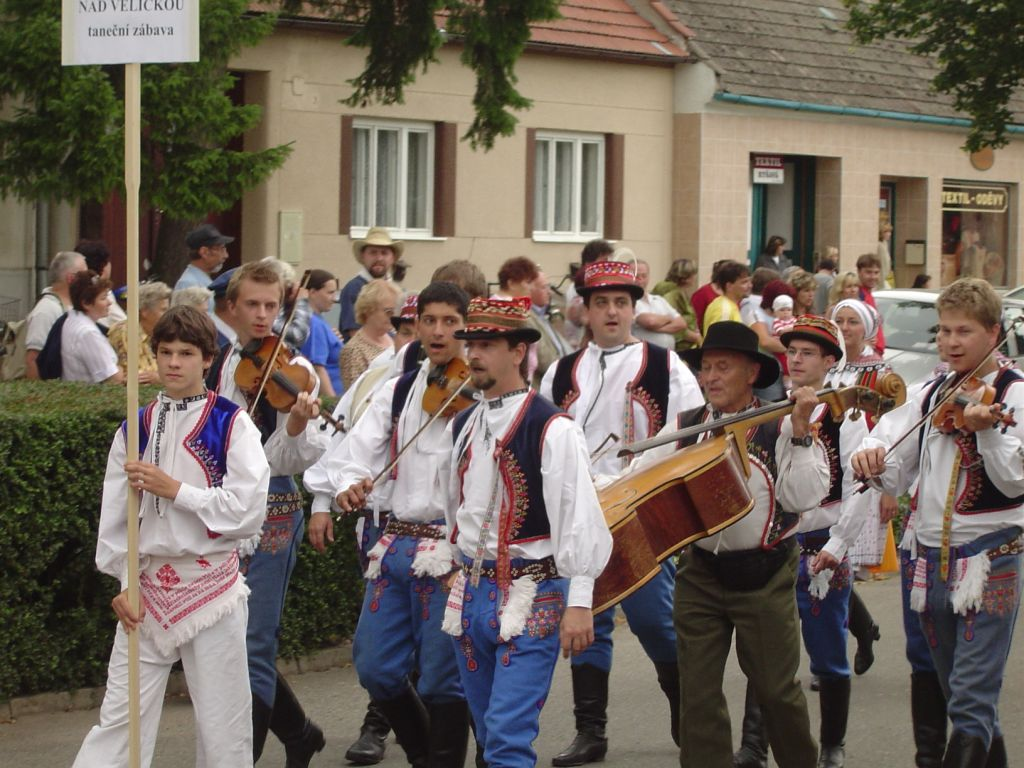
Traditional folk musicians from Velká nad Veličkou

Traditional music of Horňácko is formed by several distinctive stylistic elements. The ornamentation of the melody varies by instrument and musician. The first violinist (called "primáš", usually a leader of an ensemble) plays the most complicated variations. The other musicians accompany the primáš with their own ornamentations, following only the basic structure of a song. Folk musicians from Horňácko often use unusual combinations of tones and harsh harmonies, seemingly omitting the standard procedures of musical theory. The structure is, however, firmly anchored by rhythmic and harmonic plan.

An important feature of Horňácko folk songs is the communicative function. The lyrics of the songs serve as the means of expression for various opinions and feelings: love, joy, sadness, poverty, unfulfilled expectations, etc. The most important form of musical setting of the songs was dance music.

A significant type of folk song in Horňácko is called „táhlé“ (in slow tempo). The style of this music varies for males and females due to their respective roles in traditional society. The male repertoire consists largely of military and dance songs, but also contains songs with explicit sexual content (called "ščeglivé" in the local dialect). On the other hand, the female repertoire often makes use of balladic type songs.

The role of a folk musician, called "hudec", is still prestigiously regarded in Horňácko. The most famous violinists and their way of playing sometimes become subject of "cultish adoration". Jan Ňorek, Jožka Kubík and Martin Hrbáč rank among the legendary violinists of Horňácko.

Horňácko Folk Festival is the most important event in the region. The festival, focused solely on the authentic folklore of the region, is held annually from 1957. It features local musicians and artists and attracts visitors from the every corner of the Czech Republic. The festival is traditionally held around the feast day of St. Mary Magdalene (on 22 July).

=== Costume ===
Traditional costume of Horňácko represents an important and characteristic part of local folk culture. The folk costume is classified as a "mountain-type", similarly as the folk clothing at Moravian Wallachia or Kopanice. The oldest influences may perhaps come from the pagan eras. The white color is considered funereal, which is similar to the customs of the old Slavs. The characteristic embroidery of Horňácko has its roots in the Renaissance period.
