= Strání =

- Municipality
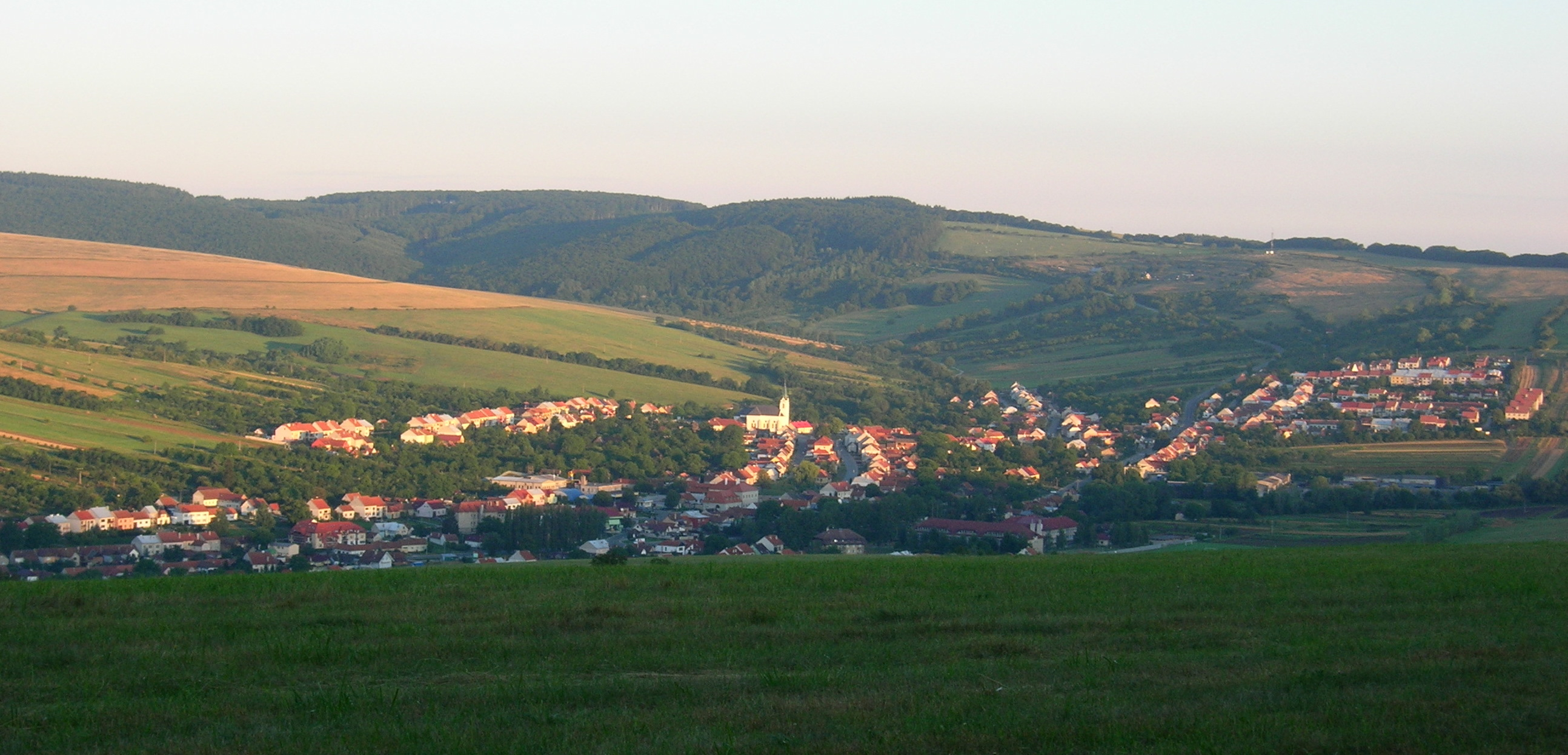
- General view of Strání

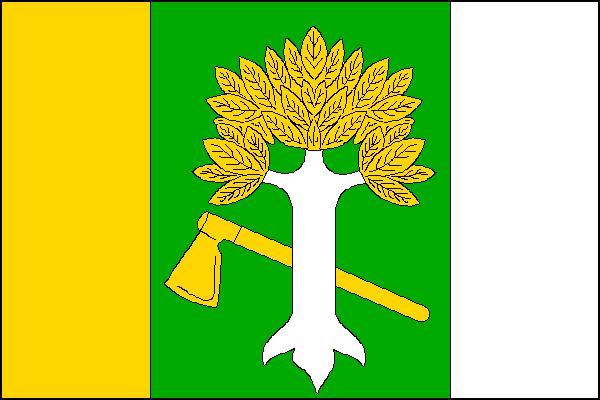
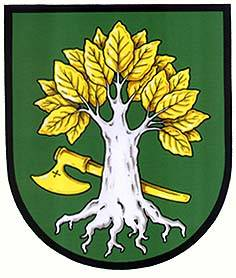
- Flag Coat of arms

- Location in the Czech Republic
- Coordinates: 48°54′8″N 17°42′24″E
- Country: Czech Republic
- Region: Zlín
- District: Uherské Hradiště
- First mentioned: 1318

Area
  - Total: 39.80 km^{2} (15.37 sq mi)
- Elevation: 418 m (1,371 ft)

Population (2026-01-01)
  - Total: 3,330
  - Density: 83.7/km^{2} (217/sq mi)
- Time zone: UTC+1 (CET)
  - Summer (DST): UTC+2 (CEST)
- Postal codes: 687 65, 687 66
- Website: www.strani.cz

Strání (Czech pronunciation: [ˈstraːɲiː]) is a municipality and village in Uherské Hradiště District in the Zlín Region of the Czech Republic. It has about 3,300 inhabitants. The municipality is located in the White Carpathians mountain range. For centuries, the village of Květná within the municipality was famous for glass production, but it ended in 2023.

== Administrative division ==
Strání consists of two municipal parts (in brackets population according to the 2021 census):

- Strání (2,121)
- Květná (1,104)

== Etymology ==
The name is derived from the Czech word stráně (i.e. 'slopes'). The name reflects the location of the village in a valley.

== Geography ==
Strání is located about 25 kilometres (16 mi) southeast of Uherské Hradiště and 22 km (14 mi) west of Trenčín, on the border with Slovakia. It lies in the White Carpathians mountain range and within the Bílé Karpaty Protected Landscape Area. The highest point of Strání and of the entire White Carpathians is the mountain Velká Javořina at 970 m (3,182 ft) above sea level, whose peak is located on the Czech–Slovak border. The built-up area is situated in the valley of the Klanečnice Stream, which originates in the hills in the western part of the municipality. The Velička River originates in the territory of Strání, on the slope of Velká Javořina.

== History ==
Strání is located in an ancient mining area and an apparent settlement area of the Stone Age Corded Ware Culture (2,900–2,350 BC). In the 11th and 12th centuries, the area of Strání was on the so-called Hungarian Way. This road was used by Bohemian troops as they marched to attack the Turks and Tatars in Hungary. After the mid-13th century, it became an important commercial link between Hungary and the Czech lands.

The first written mention of Strání is from 1318. In 1359, Strání was first referred to as a market town. In 1483, tolls were collected in Strání for the upkeep of the commercial road, and in 1492 Strání included 44 houses and two mills. In 1502, John Bernard of Kunovice acquired the Ostroh estate, including Strání.

In 1605, the market town of Strání was devastated by the Stephen Bocskai's army and it became a village again. The Bernard of Kunovice family owned the estate until the Battle of White Mountain in 1618, when their lands were confiscated from them by the Emperor because the family supported the failed rebellion against him. In 1625, the estate was sold to the Liechtenstein family, which maintained ownership of Strání until 1945.

== Demographics ==
Historical population

Year	Pop.	±%
1869	1,382	—
1880	1,570	+13.6%
1890	1,693	+7.8%
1900	1,938	+14.5%
1910	2,308	+19.1%

Year	Pop.	±%
1921	2,426	+5.1%
1930	2,549	+5.1%
1950	2,939	+15.3%
1961	3,294	+12.1%
1970	3,525	+7.0%

Year	Pop.	±%
1980	3,736	+6.0%
1991	3,820	+2.2%
2001	3,848	+0.7%
2011	3,522	−8.5%
2021	3,225	−8.4%

Source: Censuses

== Economy ==
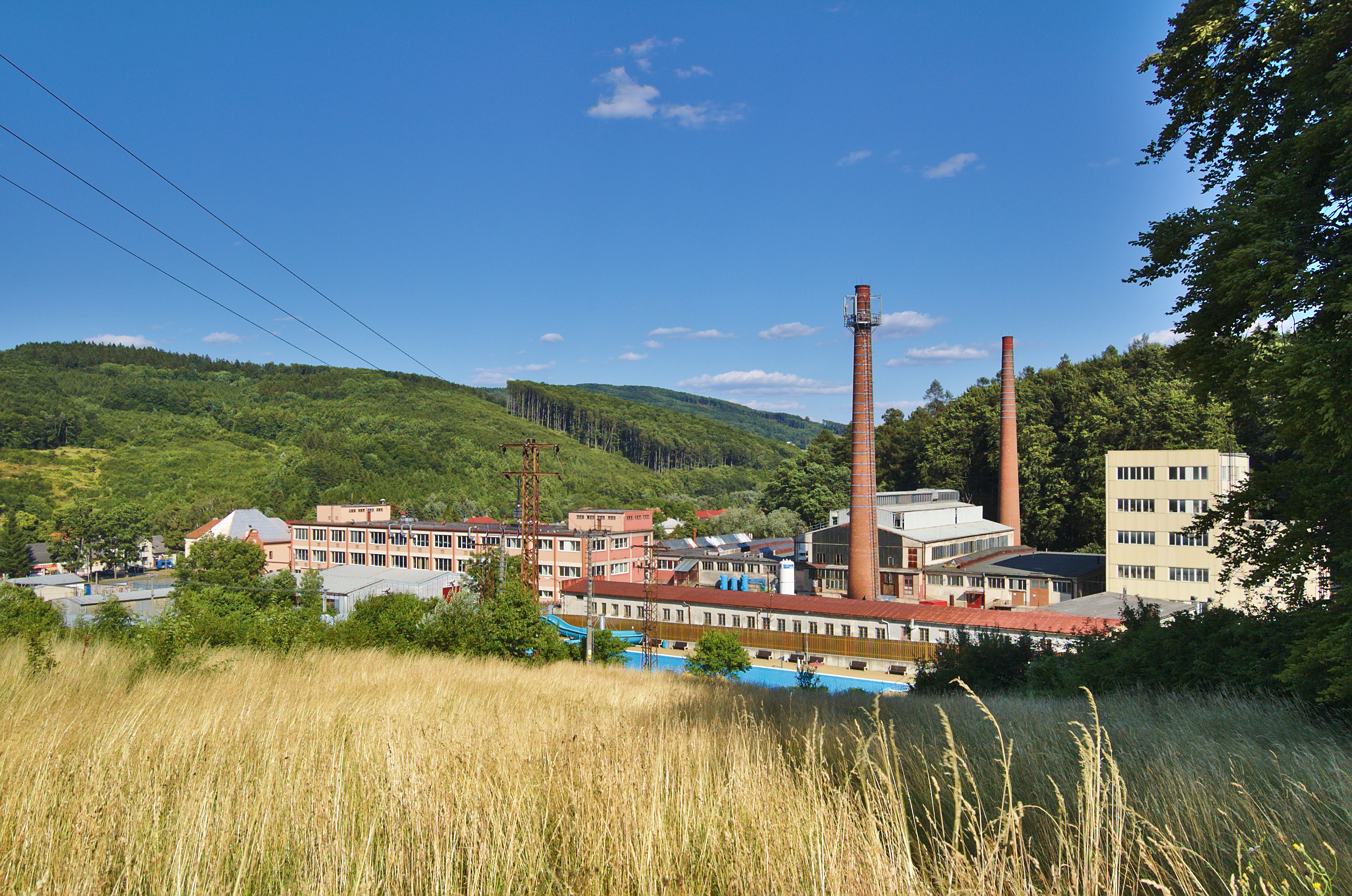
Květná Glass Works

In 1794, the Liechtensteins chose Strání as the location of a glass works thanks to the beech forests, high-quality glass sand and the close proximity of an important trade route to Hungary. Glass production began in the summer of 1795. In 1897, Květná was only the second glass factory in Europe to introduce etched glass production. It was one of the longest-running glassworks in the country and the oldest in Europe. At the end of 2023, the operator was forced to stop production and lay off most of the employees due to the increase in energy prices and reduced competitiveness. Operations may be resumed under certain circumstances.

== Transport ==
On the Czech–Slovak border is the road border crossing Strání / Moravské Lieskové. The I/54 road connects Brno with this border crossing and then continues to Nové Mesto nad Váhom.

== Education ==
There are two kindergartens and a primary school in the municipality. There is also one primary art school.

== Sights ==
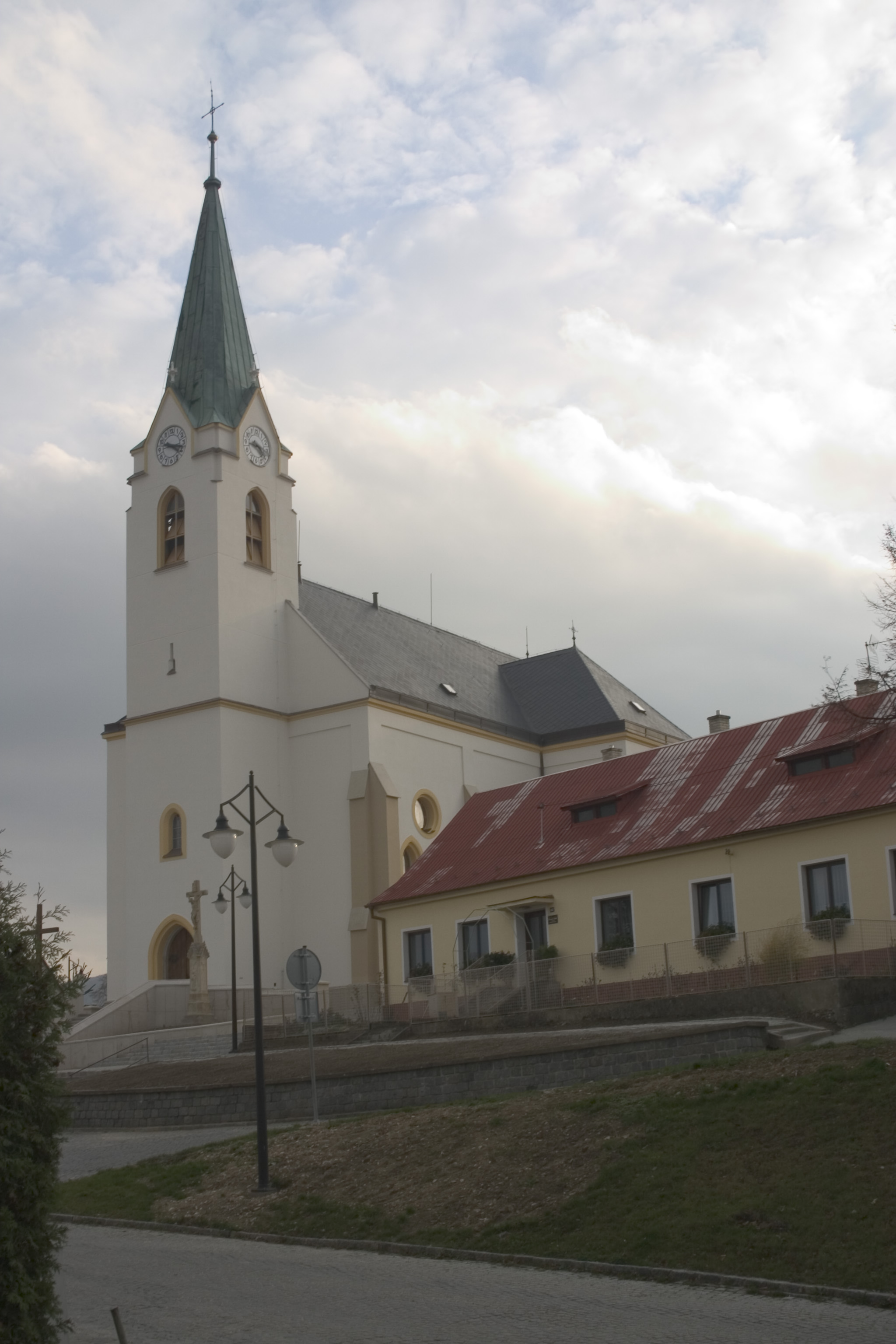
Church of the Exaltation of the Holy Cross

The Church of the Exaltation of the Holy Cross is in the centre of Strání. The original parish church was first commissioned by Prince Wenceslaus von Liechtenstein in 1749. and was built with material taken from the ruins of a fortress. The church was damaged by a fire in 1893 and demolished in 1908. In 1909–1911, a new church was built in the neo-Gothic style.

Štrbákovec is a 19th-century house that is a valuable example of folk architecture. Today it is used for cultural purposes.

Zámeček is a two-story house with vaulted ceilings. It is a former manor house first documented in 1592 and later used as a hunting lodge. In the 18th century, it was an administrative building of the Liechtensteins. In 2010, it was repaired. Since then, it houses a hotel with a restaurant, owned by the municipality.

== Notable people ==
- Josef Nuzík (born 1966), archbishop of Olomouc
- Ondřej Benešík (born 1976), politician; lives here

== Twin towns – sister cities ==
Strání is twinned with:

- Euratsfeld, Austria
