= Velká nad Veličkou =

- Municipality
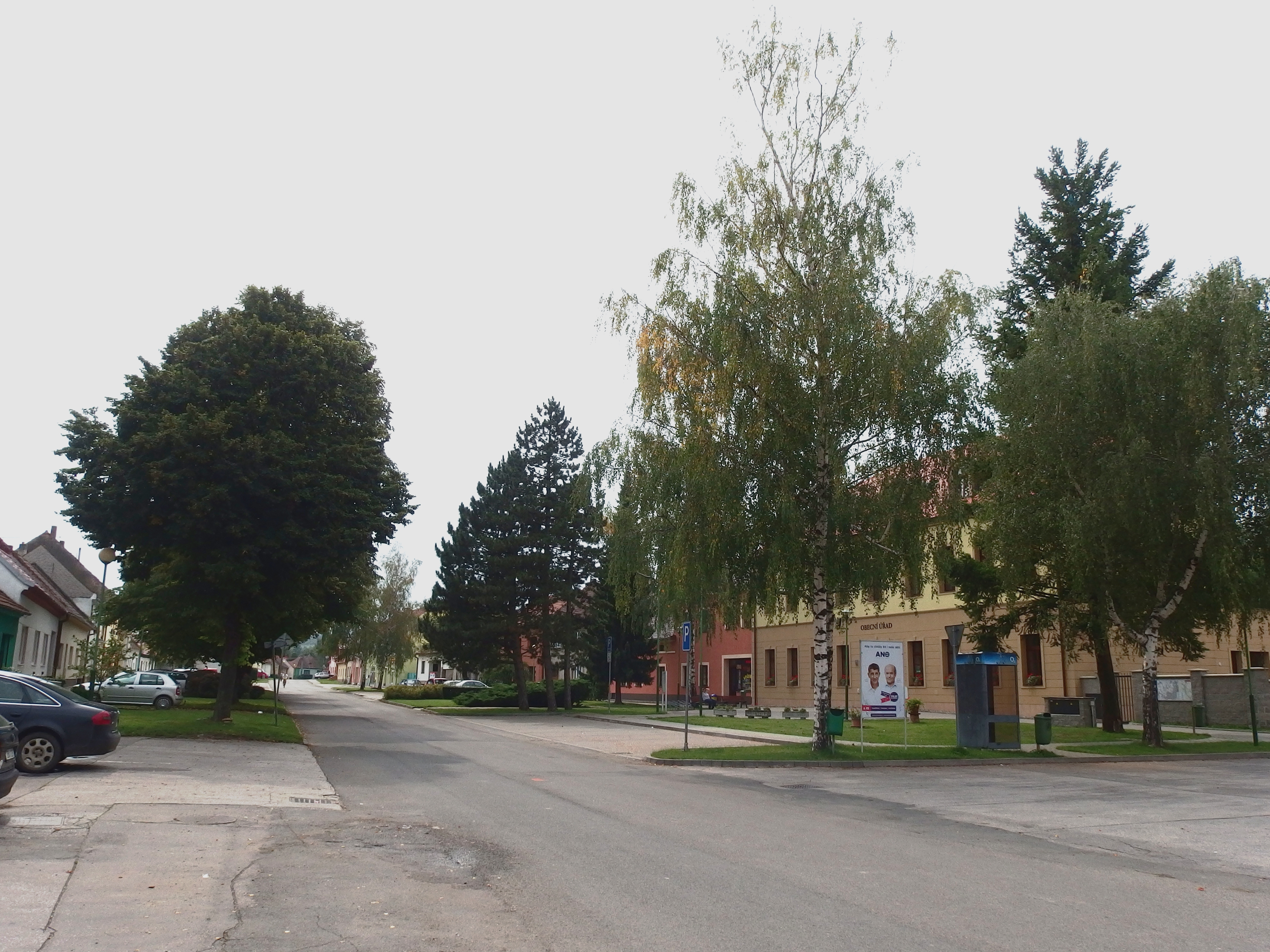
- Centre of Velká nad Veličkou

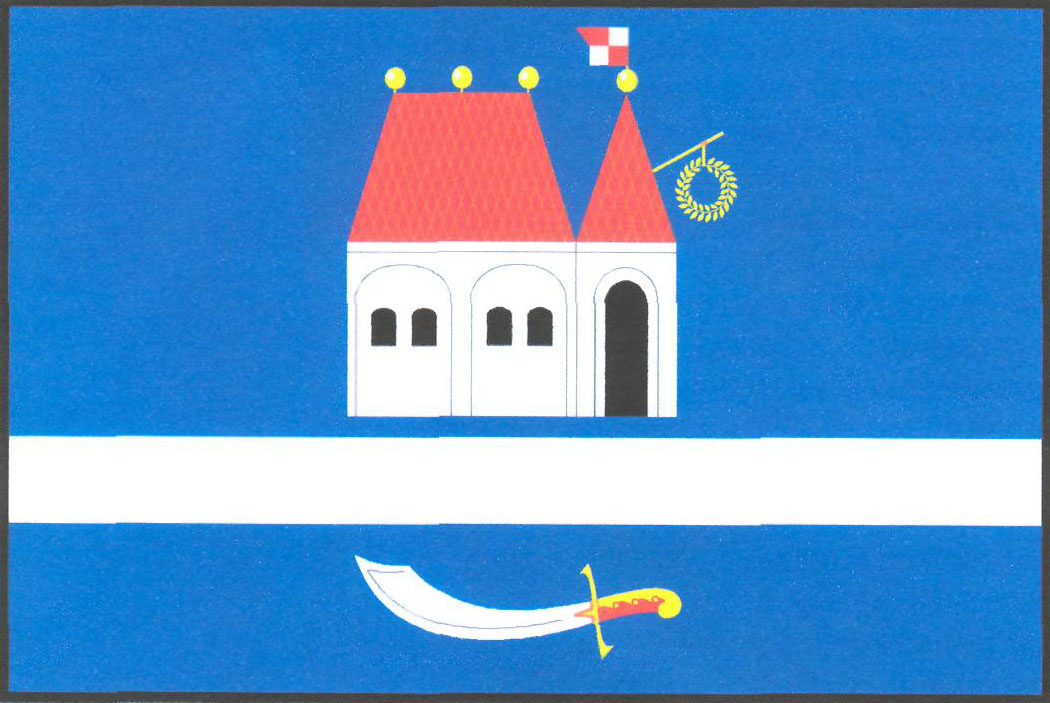
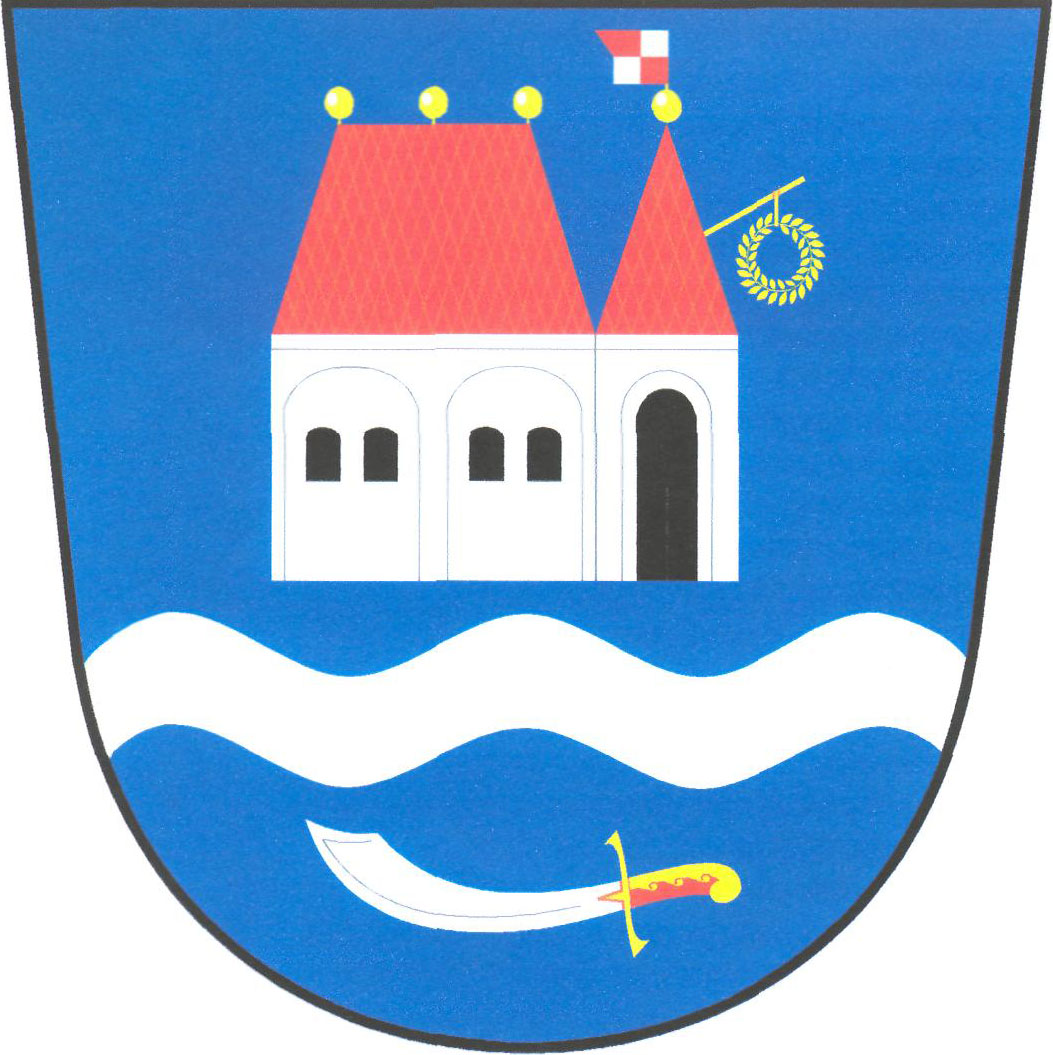
- Flag Coat of arms

- Location in the Czech Republic
- Coordinates: 48°52′57″N 17°31′14″E
- Country: Czech Republic
- Region: South Moravian
- District: Hodonín
- First mentioned: 1228

Area
  - Total: 25.91 km^{2} (10.00 sq mi)
- Elevation: 288 m (945 ft)

Population (2026-01-01)
  - Total: 2,778
  - Density: 107.2/km^{2} (277.7/sq mi)
- Time zone: UTC+1 (CET)
  - Summer (DST): UTC+2 (CEST)
- Postal code: 696 74
- Website: www.obecvelka.cz

Velká nad Veličkou (German: Welka) is a municipality and village in Hodonín District in the South Moravian Region of the Czech Republic. It has about 2,800 inhabitants.

== Etymology ==
The name literally means 'great upon Velička' in Czech.

== Geography ==
Velká nad Veličkou is located about 28 kilometres (17 mi) east of Hodonín and 36 km (22 mi) west of Trenčín. It lies in the White Carpathians mountain range. The highest point is the hill Háj at 573 m (1,880 ft) above sea level. The Velička River flows through the municipality.

== History ==
The oldest written mention of Velká nad Veličkou is from 1228, when it was described as a township (oppidum) with market rights, which hints at a long previous development. In 1370, the settlement was sold to Beneš of Kravaře and merged with the Strážnice estate.

== Demographics ==
Historical population

Year	Pop.	±%
1869	1,651	—
1880	1,656	+0.3%
1890	1,761	+6.3%
1900	1,825	+3.6%
1910	1,925	+5.5%

Year	Pop.	±%
1921	1,878	−2.4%
1930	2,056	+9.5%
1950	1,969	−4.2%
1961	2,416	+22.7%
1970	2,739	+13.4%

Year	Pop.	±%
1980	3,201	+16.9%
1991	3,204	+0.1%
2001	3,228	+0.7%
2011	2,879	−10.8%
2021	2,732	−5.1%

Source: Censuses

== Transport ==
Velká nad Veličkou is located on a railway line heading from Zaječí to Myjava, Slovakia (via Hodonín), but trains only run on weekends.

== Culture ==
Velká nad Veličkou lies in the ethnographic region of Horňácko.

== Sights ==
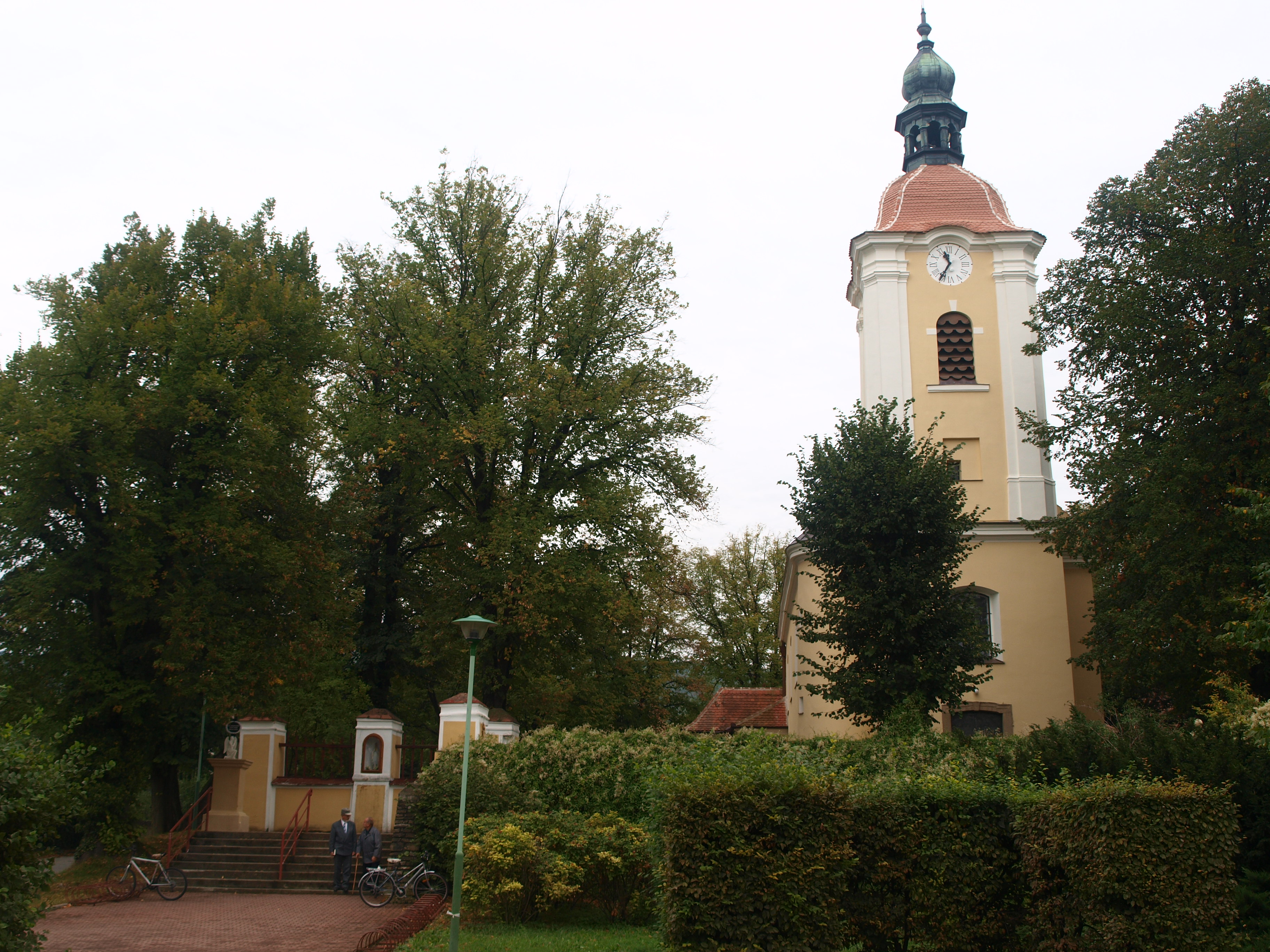
Church of Saint Mary Magdalene

The landmark of Velká nad Veličkou is the Church of Saint Mary Magdalene. The original Gothic church was built in the 14th century. At the end of the 15th century, it was fortified and served as a refuge during raids from neighbouring lands. After it was burned down by Tatars in the 17th century, it was rebuilt in its current form in the mid-18th century. The church complex includes a wall around the church and a valuable statue of Saint John of Nepomuk from 1747.

== Notable people ==
- Eduard Urx (1903–1942), politician and journalist

== Twin towns – sister cities ==
Velká nad Veličkou is twinned with:

- Nowy Dwór Gdański, Poland
