= Kuželov =

- Municipality
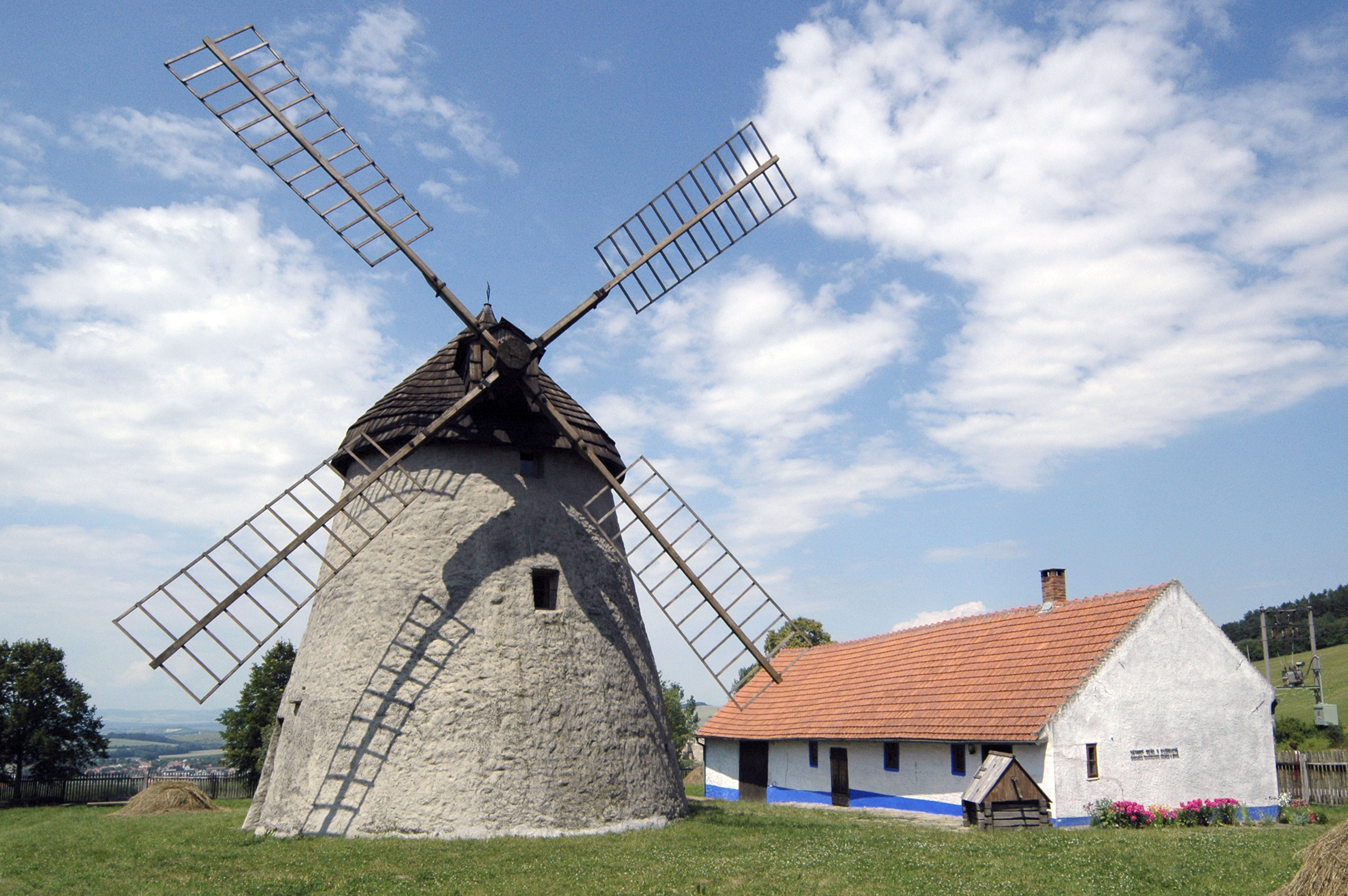
- Windmill

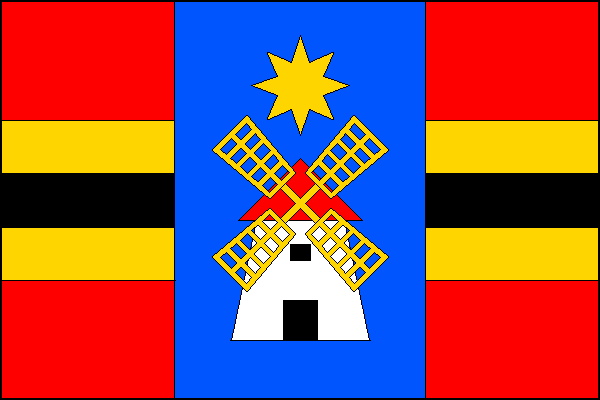
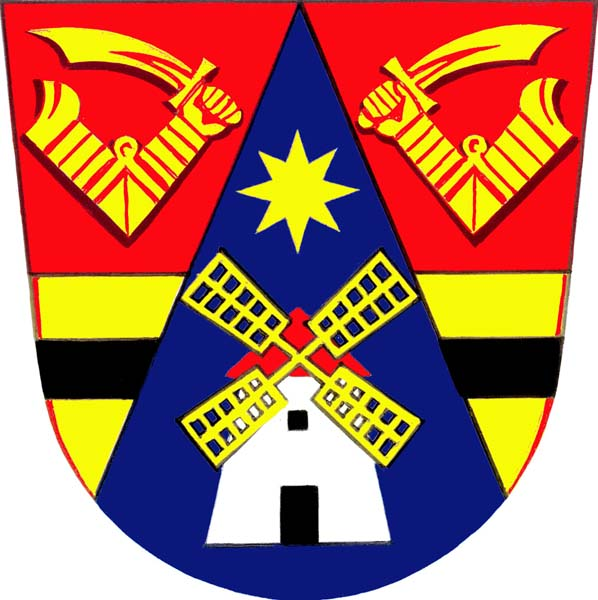
- Flag Coat of arms

- Location in the Czech Republic
- Coordinates: 48°51′35″N 17°29′20″E
- Country: Czech Republic
- Region: South Moravian
- District: Hodonín
- First mentioned: 1406

Area
  - Total: 10.15 km^{2} (3.92 sq mi)
- Elevation: 294 m (965 ft)

Population (2026-01-01)
  - Total: 415
  - Density: 40.9/km^{2} (106/sq mi)
- Time zone: UTC+1 (CET)
  - Summer (DST): UTC+2 (CEST)
- Postal code: 696 73
- Website: www.kuzelov.com

Kuželov (German: Kuzelau) is a municipality and village in Hodonín District in the South Moravian Region of the Czech Republic. It has about 400 inhabitants.

== Geography ==
Kuželov is located about 26 kilometres (16 mi) east of Hodonín, 72 km (45 mi) southeast of Brno and 39 km (24 mi) west of Trenčín in Slovakia. It borders Slovakia in the south. The municipality lies on the border between the White Carpathians mountain range and the Vizovice Highlands. The highest point is at 534 m (1,752 ft) above sea level.

== History ==
The first written mention of Kuželov is from 1406. During the feudal times, the village belonged to the Veselí estate and then to the Uherský Ostroh estate.

== Demographics ==
Historical population

Year	Pop.	±%
1869	586	—
1880	655	+11.8%
1890	670	+2.3%
1900	678	+1.2%
1910	703	+3.7%

Year	Pop.	±%
1921	659	−6.3%
1930	582	−11.7%
1950	560	−3.8%
1961	567	+1.2%
1970	476	−16.0%

Year	Pop.	±%
1980	454	−4.6%
1991	434	−4.4%
2001	436	+0.5%
2011	398	−8.7%
2021	386	−3.0%

Source: Censuses

== Transport ==
There are no railways or major roads passing through the municipality.

== Culture ==
Kuželov lies in the ethnographic region of Horňácko.

== Sights ==
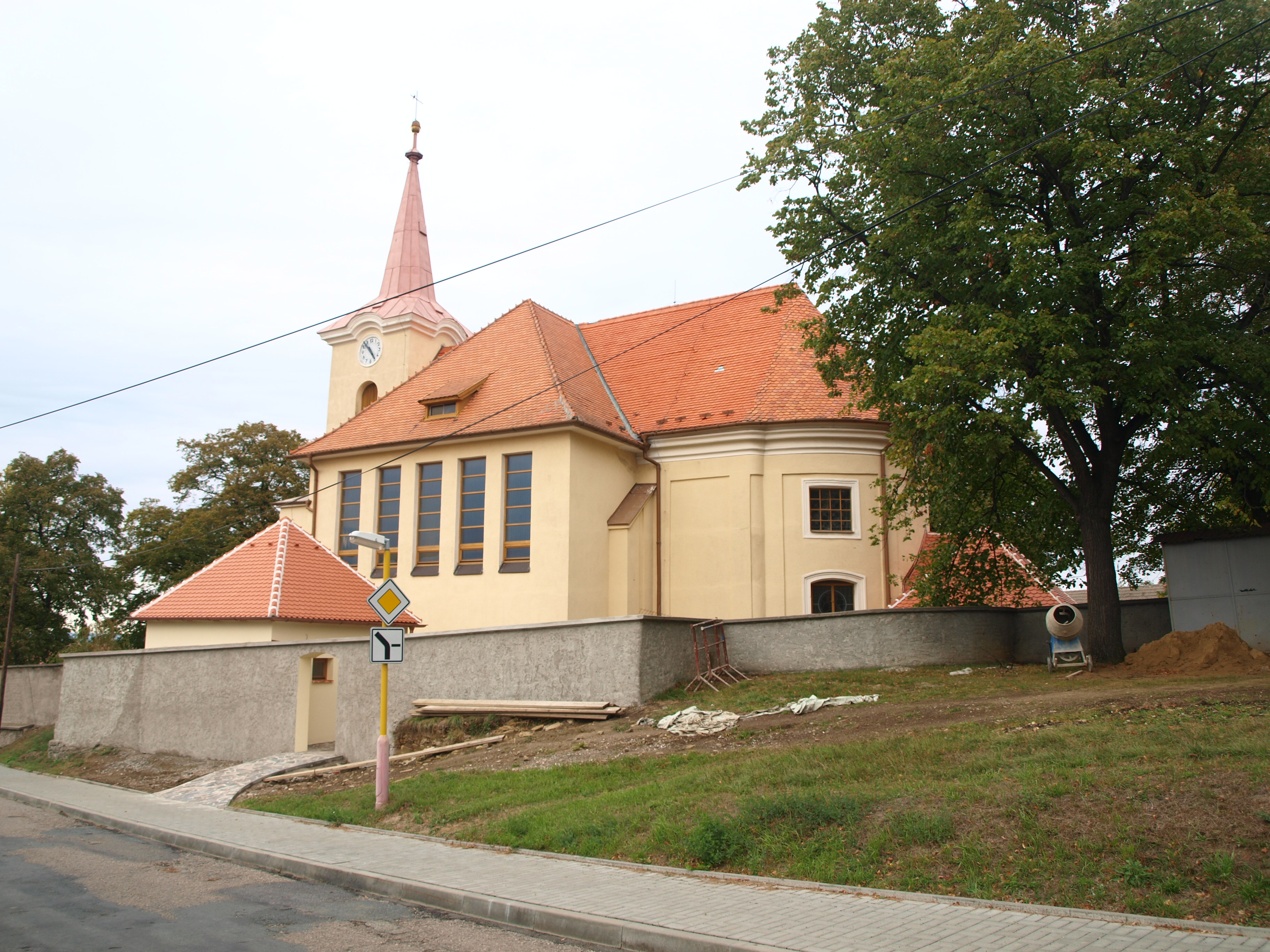
Church of the Holy Trinity

Kuželov is known for a windmill, protected as a national cultural monument. It dates from 1842 and is a rare example of preserved Holland-type windmill. It served farmers for over a hundred years, but its operations ceased in 1946. In 1973, it was transferred to the administration of the Technical Museum in Brno, which carried out its reconstruction and renovation. After the reconstruction, the mill is functional again as a museum exhibit and its interior houses an exposition about milling and life in the Horňácko region.

The main landmark of the centre of Kuželov is the Church of the Holy Trinity. It was originally a chapel, built in the Baroque style in 1718. The tower was added in 1770 and the chapel was converted into a church.
