= Ondřej Benešík =

Czech politician and mayor

Ondřej Benešík MP
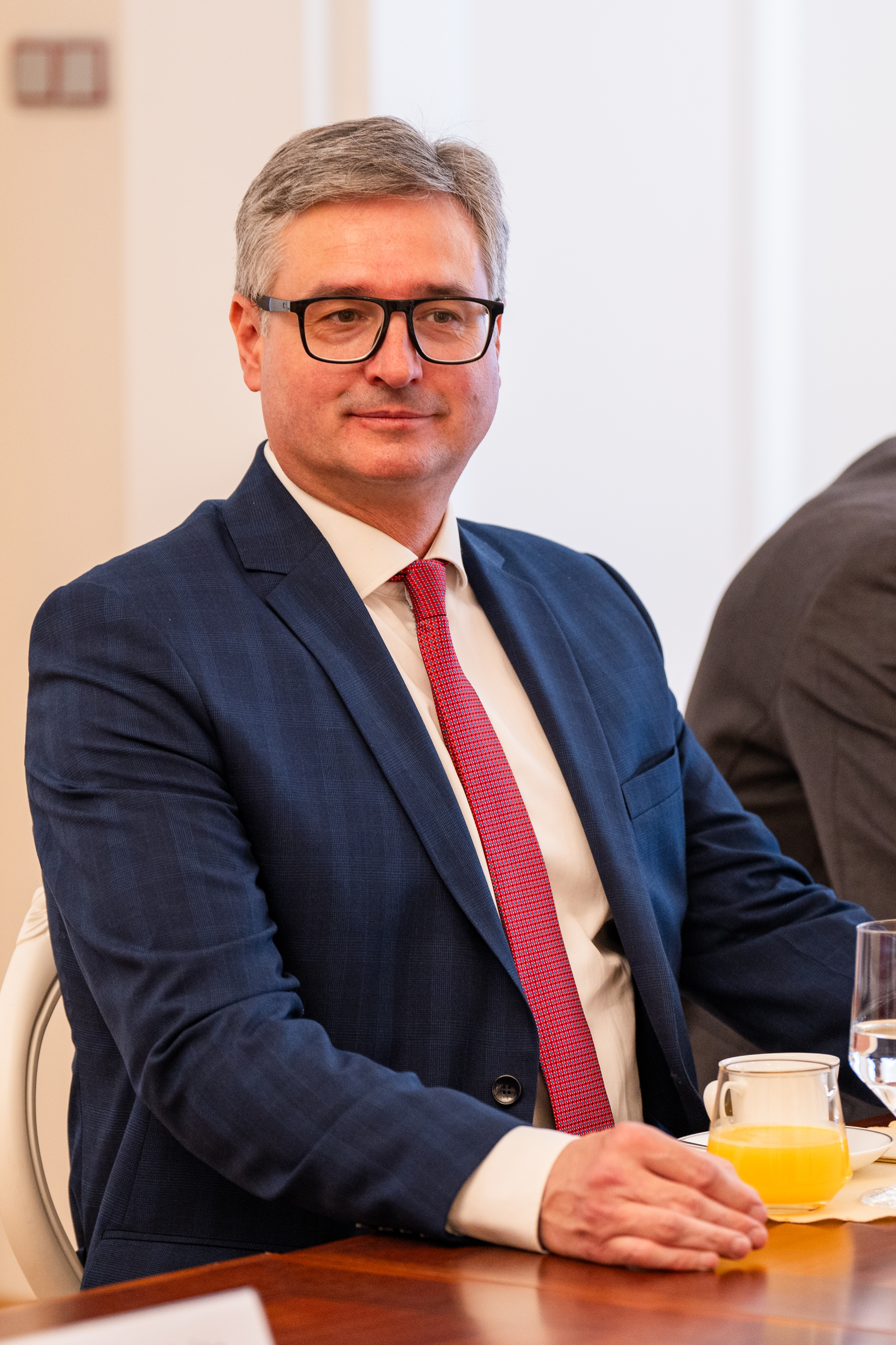
- Benešík, 2024

Member of the Chamber of Deputies
- Incumbent
- Assumed office 26 October 2013

Personal details
- Born: 27 June 1976 (age 50) Uherské Hradiště, Czechoslovakia (now Czech Republic)
- Party: KDU–ČSL
- Domestic partner: Jitka Benešíková
- Children: 3
- Education: Masaryk University

Ondřej Benešík (born 27 June 1976) is a Czech politician and member of the Chamber of Deputies for KDU-ČSL since October 2013.

From 2010 to 2014 he served as mayor of Strání. From 2015 to 2022, he was a deputy chairman of his party.

Since 2014 he has been a member of the Parliamentary Assembly of the Council of Europe. He also serves as the head of the European Affairs Committee within the Czech parliament, as well as the parliamentary liaison to the United States.
