= Malá Vrbka =

- Municipality
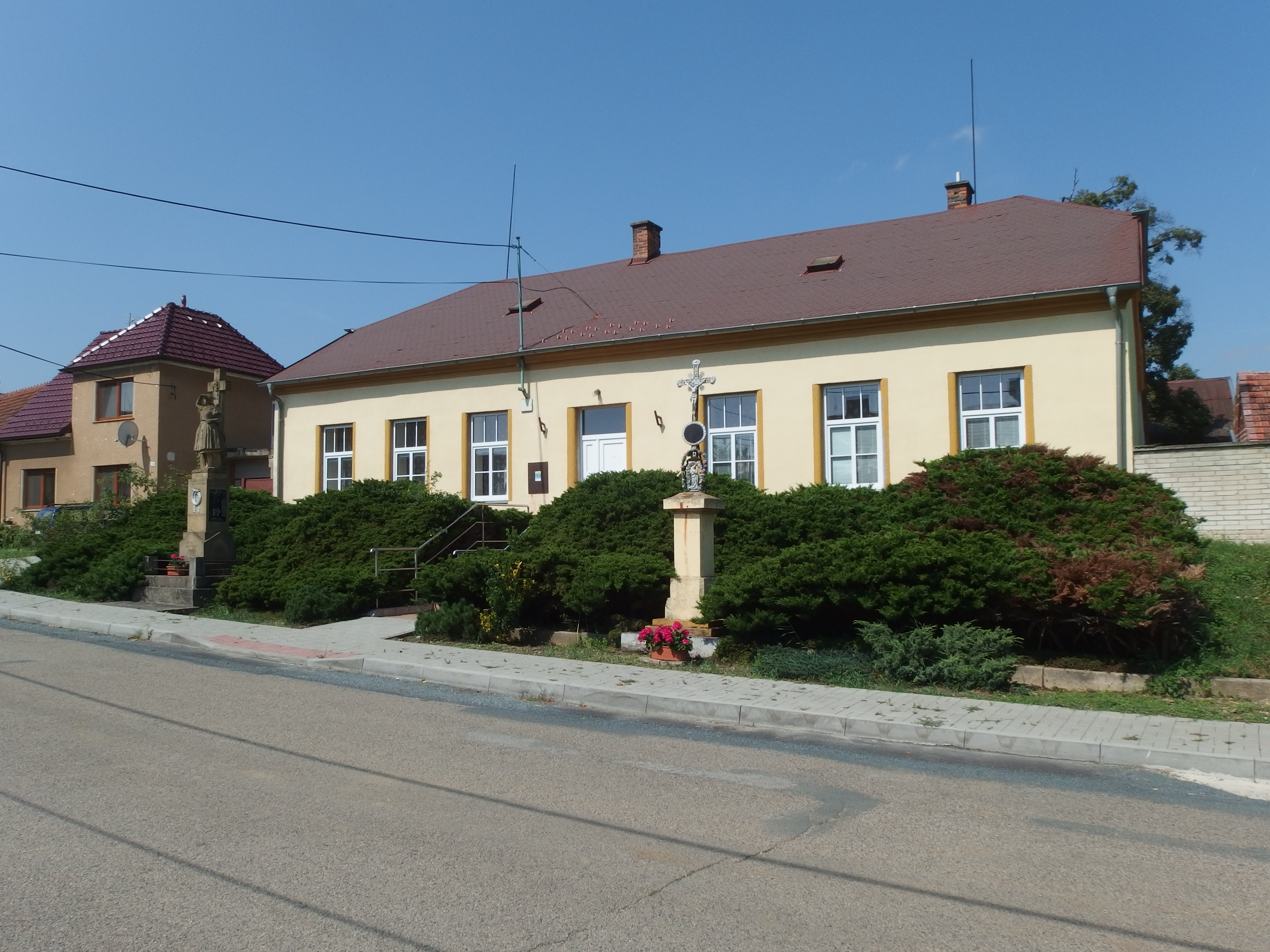
- Former school

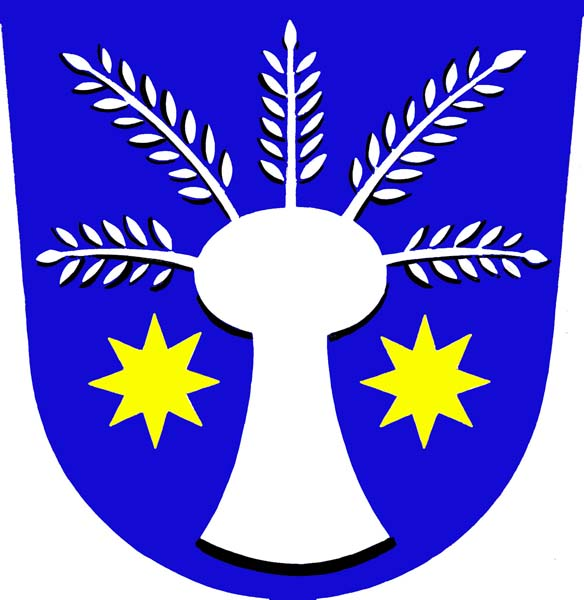
- Flag Coat of arms

- Location in the Czech Republic
- Coordinates: 48°52′10″N 17°27′33″E
- Country: Czech Republic
- Region: South Moravian
- District: Hodonín
- First mentioned: 1401

Area
  - Total: 4.45 km^{2} (1.72 sq mi)
- Elevation: 266 m (873 ft)

Population (2026-01-01)
  - Total: 172
  - Density: 38.7/km^{2} (100/sq mi)
- Time zone: UTC+1 (CET)
  - Summer (DST): UTC+2 (CEST)
- Postal code: 696 73
- Website: www.malavrbka.cz

Malá Vrbka (German: Klein Wrbka) is a municipality and village in Hodonín District in the South Moravian Region of the Czech Republic. It has about 200 inhabitants.

Malá Vrbka, a part of traditional ethnographic region Horňácko, lies approximately 24 kilometres (15 mi) east of Hodonín, 72 km (45 mi) south-east of Brno, and 258 km (160 mi) south-east of Prague.

== Demographics ==
Historical population
Year	Pop.	±%
1869	263	—
1880	300	+14.1%
1890	303	+1.0%
1900	344	+13.5%
1910	378	+9.9%
1921	375	−0.8%
1930	349	−6.9%
1950	380	+8.9%
1961	365	−3.9%
1970	323	−11.5%
1980	292	−9.6%
1991	241	−17.5%
2001	213	−11.6%
2011	200	−6.1%
2021	150	−25.0%
Source: Censuses
