= Tomáš Zajíc =

Czech footballer

Personal information
- Date of birth: 12 August 1996 (age 30)
- Place of birth: Suchovské Mlýny, Czech Republic
- Height: 1.81 m (5 ft 11 in)
- Position: Forward

Team information
- Current team: Hanácká Slavia Kroměříž
- Number: 15

Youth career
- Slovácko

Senior career*
Years	Team	Apps	(Gls)
2015–2020	Slovácko	108	(26)
2020–2022	Baník Ostrava	30	(8)
2021–2022	→ Zagłębie Lubin (loan)	10	(2)
2021–2022	→ Zagłębie Lubin II (loan)	1	(0)
2022–2025	Dynamo České Budějovice	24	(1)
2024	→ Vyškov (loan)	15	(2)
2025–	Hanácká Slavia Kroměříž	15	(1)

International career
2017	Czech Republic U20	3	(1)
2017–2018	Czech Republic U21	7	(2)
- * Club domestic league appearances and goals as of 15 June 2025

Tomáš Zajíc (born 12 August 1996) is a Czech professional footballer who plays as a forward for Hanácká Slavia Kroměříž.

== Club career ==
He started his professional career at Slovácko. He made his senior league debut for them on 20 February 2015 in their Czech First League 1–2 home loss to Jablonec. He scored his first league goal in his second appearance, a 2–2 home draw against Dukla Prague on 6 August 2016, when he scored a late equalizer after coming on as a substitute. On 25 September 2017, he ended Slovácko's seven-hour goal drought by scoring another late equalizer, this time in a 1–1 draw at Liberec. On 31 August 2021, Zajíc was loaned out to Polish club Zagłębie Lubin. On 4 May 2022, his loan was terminated.

== International career ==
He represented the Czech Republic in the under-20 and under-21 youth categories.

== Honours ==
Zagłębie Lubin II

- III liga, gr. III: 2021–22
