= Suchov =

- Municipality
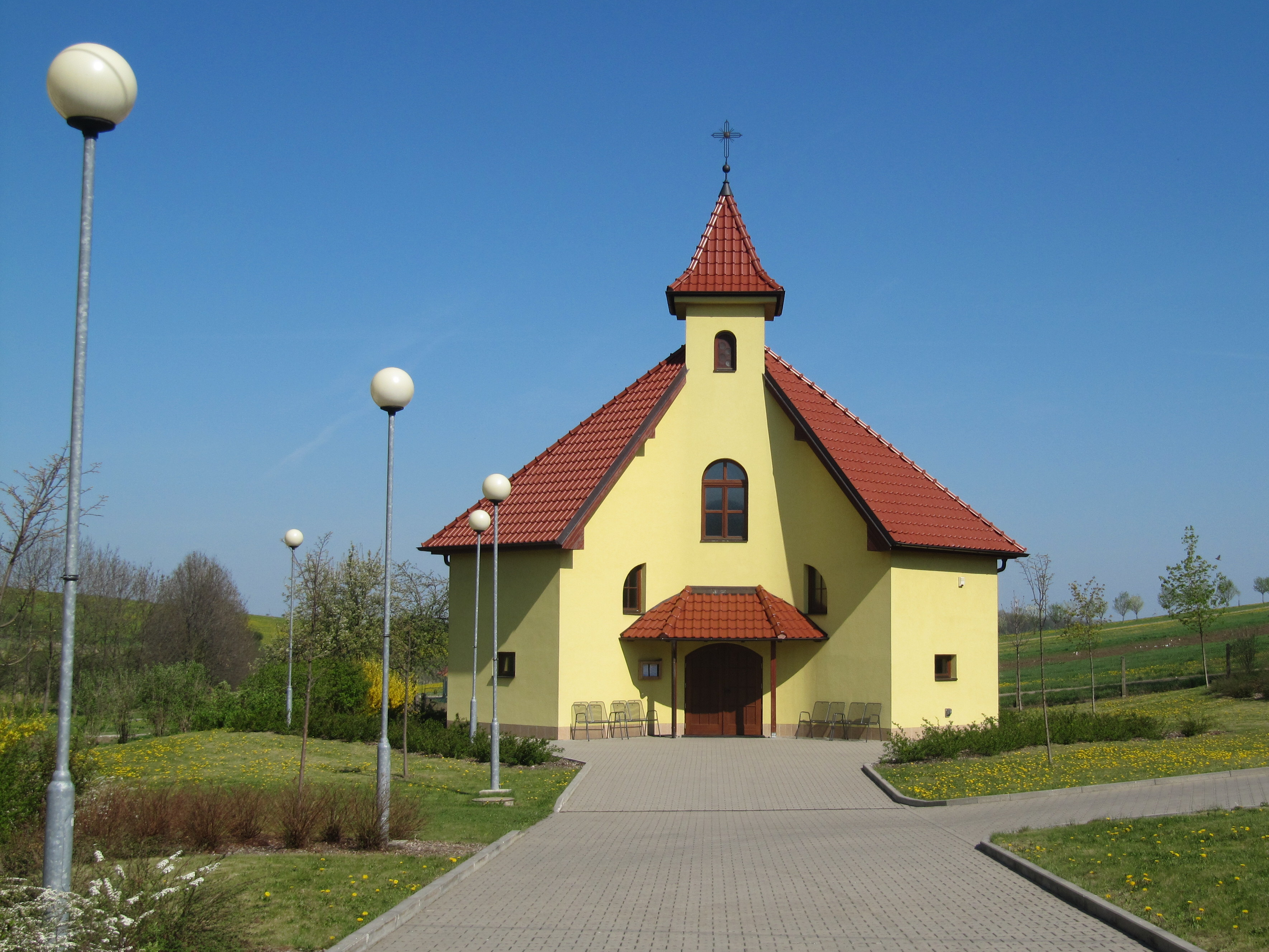
- Chapel of Saint Luke the Evangelist

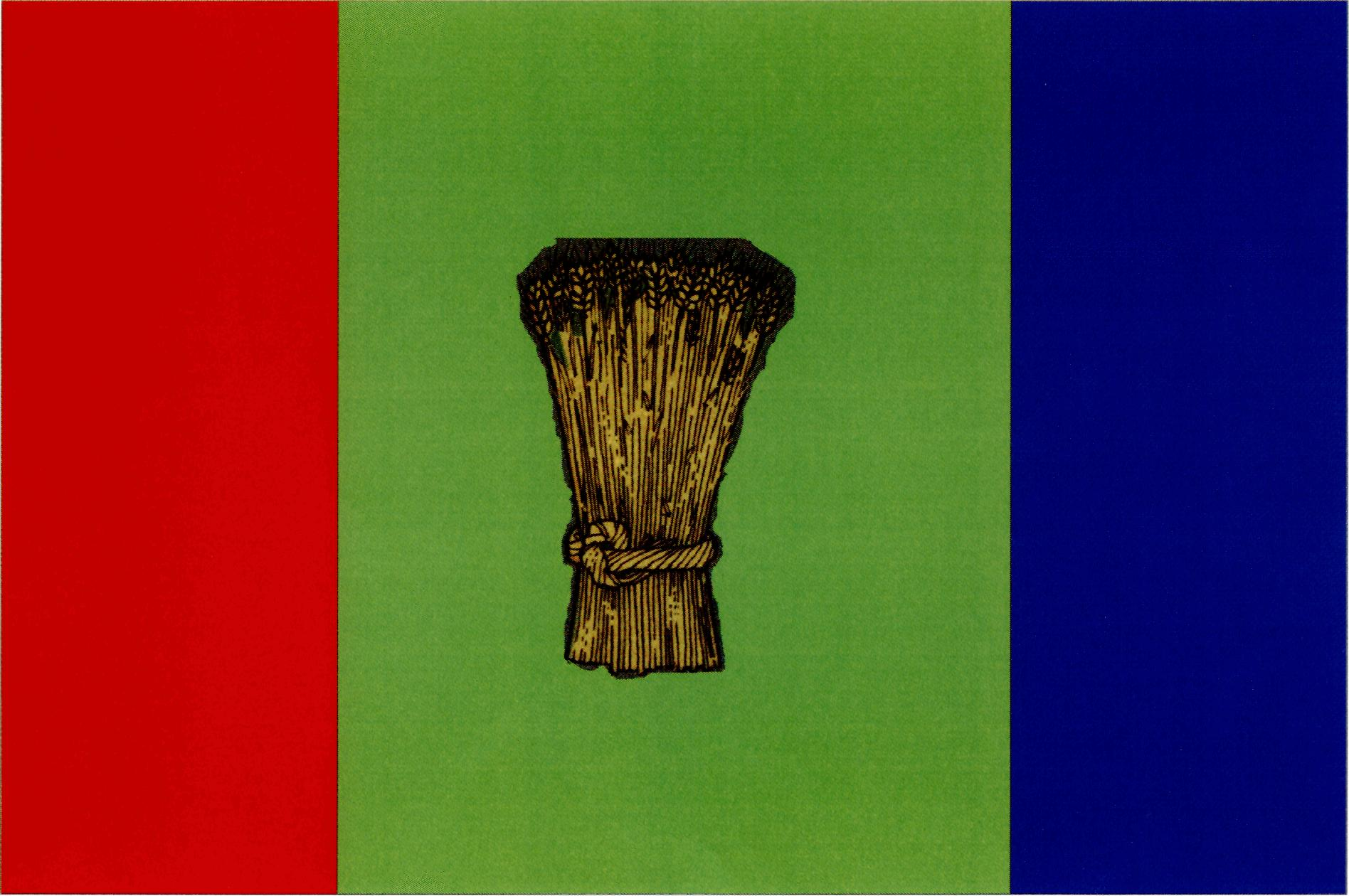
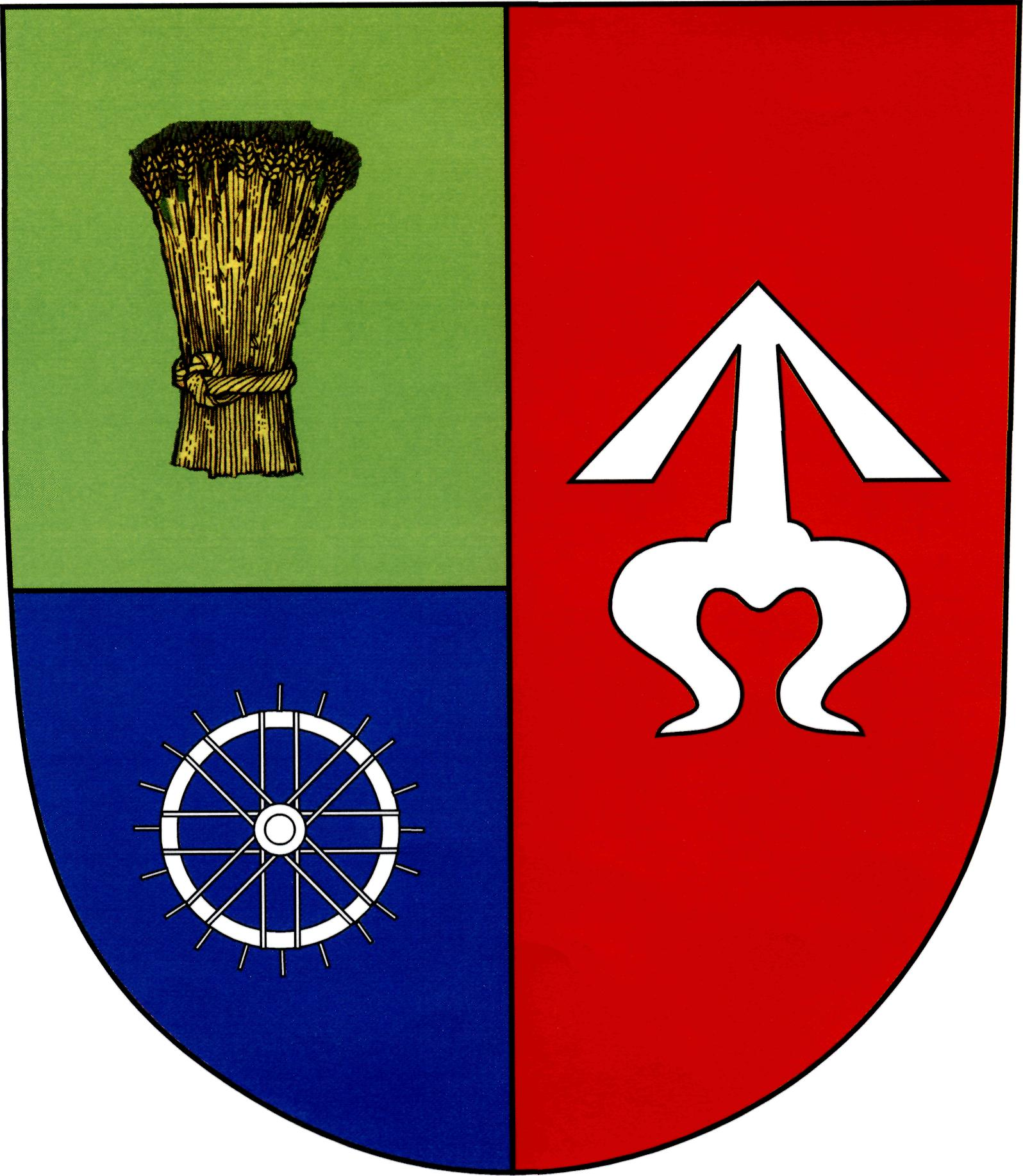
- Flag Coat of arms

- Location in the Czech Republic
- Coordinates: 48°54′27″N 17°33′48″E
- Country: Czech Republic
- Region: South Moravian
- District: Hodonín
- First mentioned: 1500

Area
  - Total: 14.46 km^{2} (5.58 sq mi)
- Elevation: 380 m (1,250 ft)

Population (2026-01-01)
  - Total: 472
  - Density: 32.6/km^{2} (84.5/sq mi)
- Time zone: UTC+1 (CET)
  - Summer (DST): UTC+2 (CEST)
- Postal code: 696 71
- Website: www.suchov.cz

Suchov is a municipality and village in Hodonín District in the South Moravian Region of the Czech Republic. It has about 500 inhabitants.

Suchov, a part of traditional ethnographic region Horňácko, lies approximately 33 kilometres (21 mi) east of Hodonín, 78 km (48 mi) south-east of Brno, and 264 km (164 mi) south-east of Prague.

== Demographics ==
Historical population
Year	Pop.	±%
1869	702	—
1880	829	+18.1%
1890	838	+1.1%
1900	897	+7.0%
1910	1,037	+15.6%
1921	1,022	−1.4%
1930	999	−2.3%
1950	915	−8.4%
1961	911	−0.4%
1970	825	−9.4%
1980	791	−4.1%
1991	652	−17.6%
2001	582	−10.7%
2011	483	−17.0%
2021	472	−2.3%
Source: Censuses

== Notable people ==
- Tomáš Zajíc (born 1996), footballer
