= Louka (Hodonín District) =

- Municipality
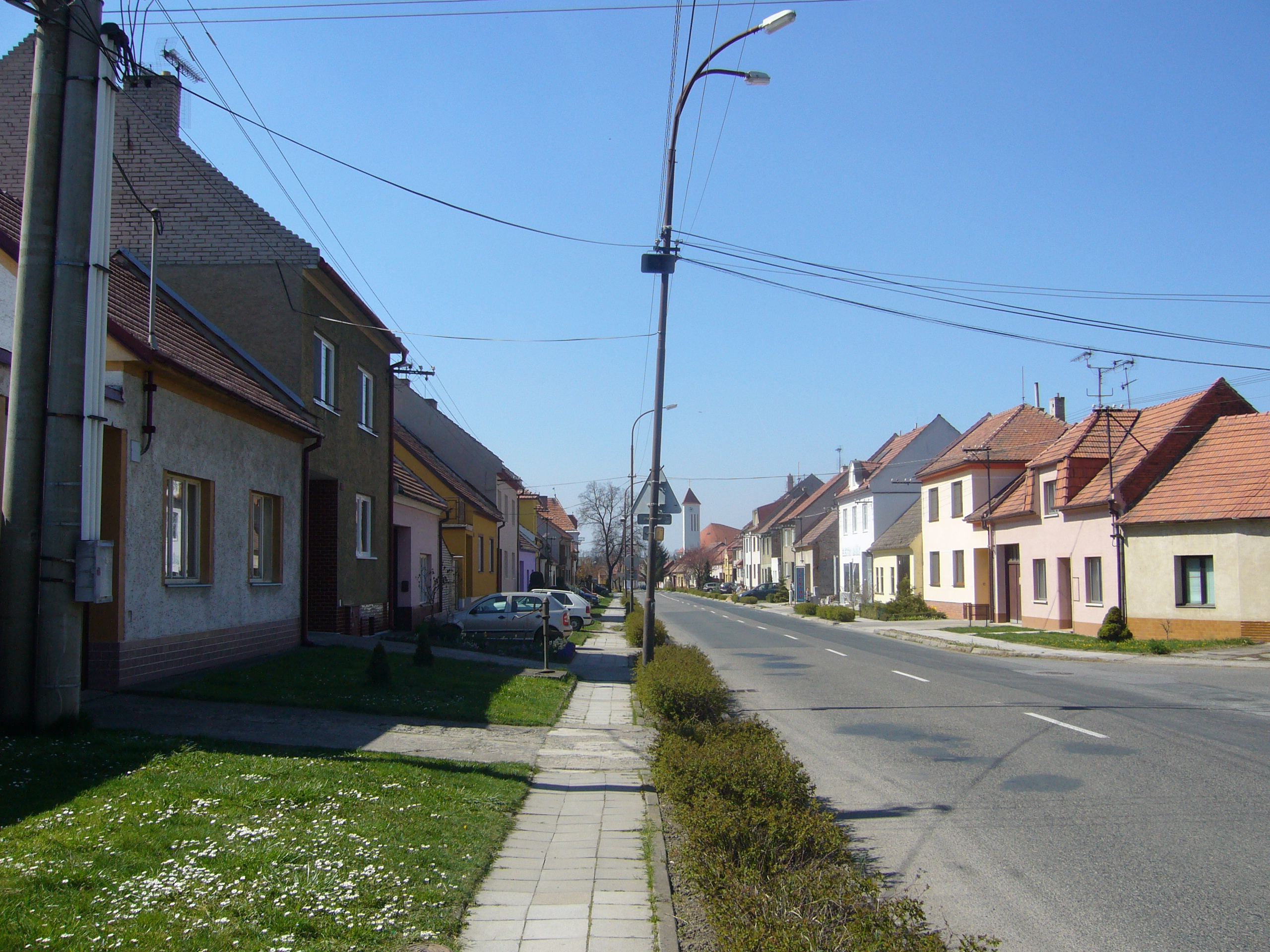
- Main street

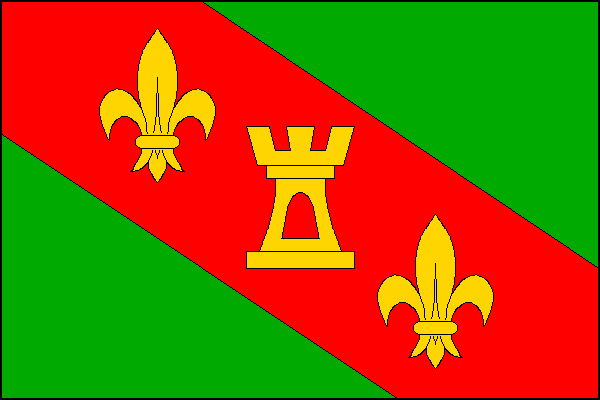
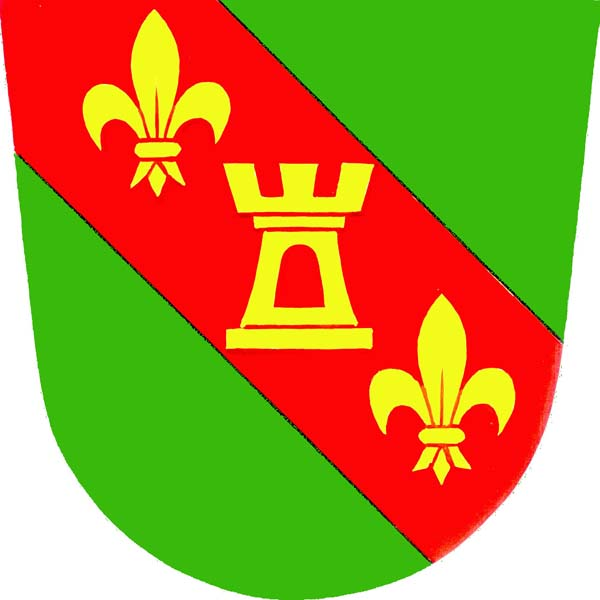
- Flag Coat of arms

- Location in the Czech Republic
- Coordinates: 48°54′55″N 17°29′21″E
- Country: Czech Republic
- Region: South Moravian
- District: Hodonín
- First mentioned: 1378

Area
  - Total: 9.50 km^{2} (3.67 sq mi)
- Elevation: 247 m (810 ft)

Population (2026-01-01)
  - Total: 921
  - Density: 96.9/km^{2} (251/sq mi)
- Time zone: UTC+1 (CET)
  - Summer (DST): UTC+2 (CEST)
- Postal code: 696 76
- Website: www.obeclouka.cz

Louka is a municipality and village in Hodonín District in the South Moravian Region of the Czech Republic. It has about 900 inhabitants.

Louka, a part of the traditional ethnographic region Horňácko, lies approximately 28 kilometres (17 mi) east of Hodonín, 71 km (44 mi) south-east of Brno, and 257 km (160 mi) south-east of Prague.

== Demographics ==
Historical population
Year	Pop.	±%
1869	722	—
1880	734	+1.7%
1890	753	+2.6%
1900	874	+16.1%
1910	890	+1.8%
1921	1,004	+12.8%
1930	1,070	+6.6%
1950	1,035	−3.3%
1961	1,185	+14.5%
1970	1,147	−3.2%
1980	1,140	−0.6%
1991	1,063	−6.8%
2001	1,045	−1.7%
2011	967	−7.5%
2021	877	−9.3%
Source: Censuses
