= Javorník (Hodonín District) =

- Municipality
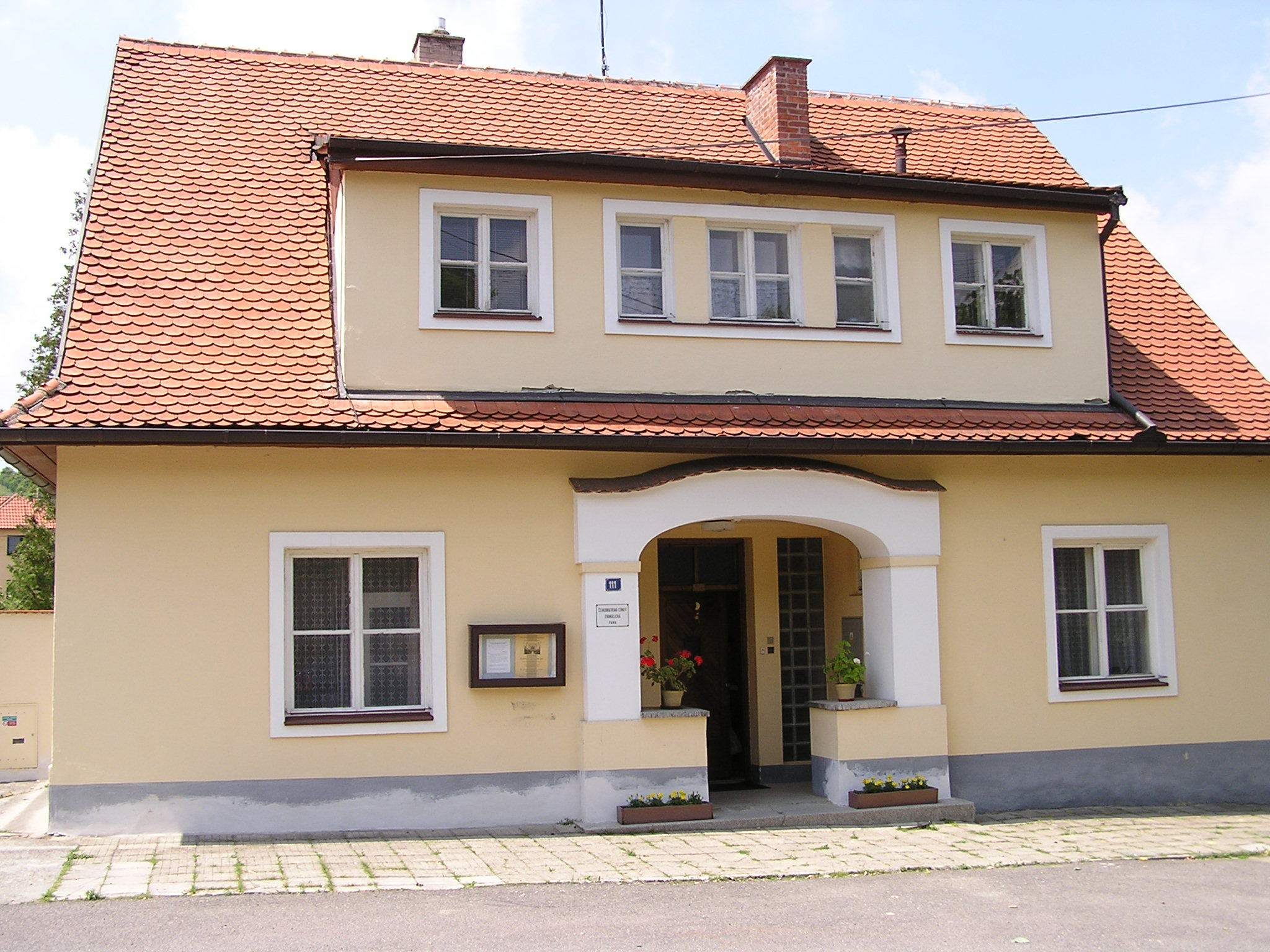
- Protestant rectory

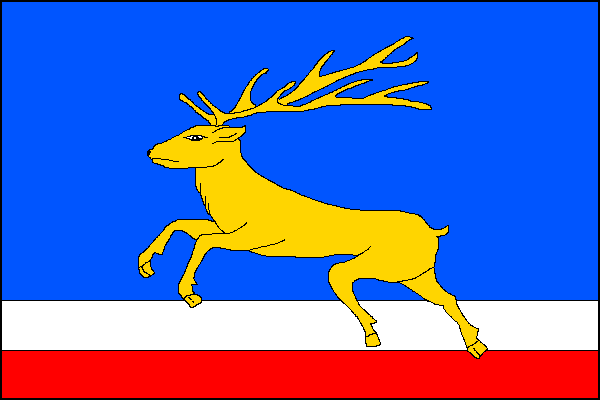
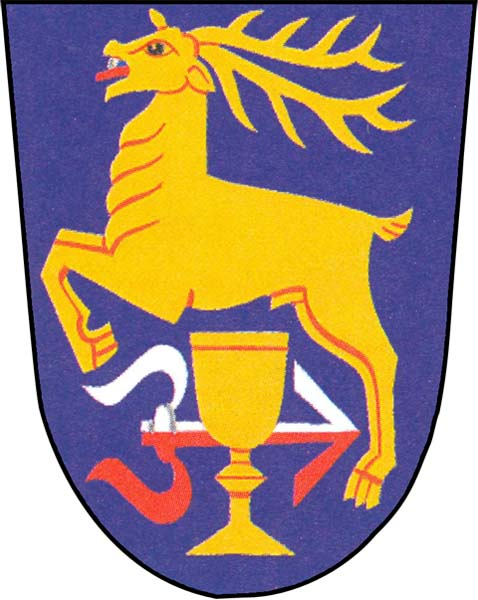
- Flag Coat of arms

- Location in the Czech Republic
- Coordinates: 48°51′43″N 17°32′0″E
- Country: Czech Republic
- Region: South Moravian
- District: Hodonín
- First mentioned: 1350

Area
  - Total: 24.45 km^{2} (9.44 sq mi)
- Elevation: 312 m (1,024 ft)

Population (2026-01-01)
  - Total: 654
  - Density: 26.7/km^{2} (69.3/sq mi)
- Time zone: UTC+1 (CET)
  - Summer (DST): UTC+2 (CEST)
- Postal code: 696 74
- Website: www.javornik-ho.cz

Javorník is a municipality and village in Hodonín District in the South Moravian Region of the Czech Republic. It has about 700 inhabitants.

Javorník, a part of traditional ethnographic region Horňácko, lies approximately 30 kilometres (19 mi) east of Hodonín, 77 km (48 mi) south-east of Brno, and 263 km (163 mi) south-east of Prague.

== Demographics ==
Historical population
Year	Pop.	±%
1869	965	—
1880	1,047	+8.5%
1890	1,036	−1.1%
1900	1,018	−1.7%
1910	989	−2.8%
1921	940	−5.0%
1930	908	−3.4%
1950	874	−3.7%
1961	942	+7.8%
1970	901	−4.4%
1980	909	+0.9%
1991	845	−7.0%
2001	716	−15.3%
2011	690	−3.6%
2021	652	−5.5%
Source: Censuses
