= Velká Javořina =

Mountain in the White Carpathians

- Slovak: Veľká Javorina
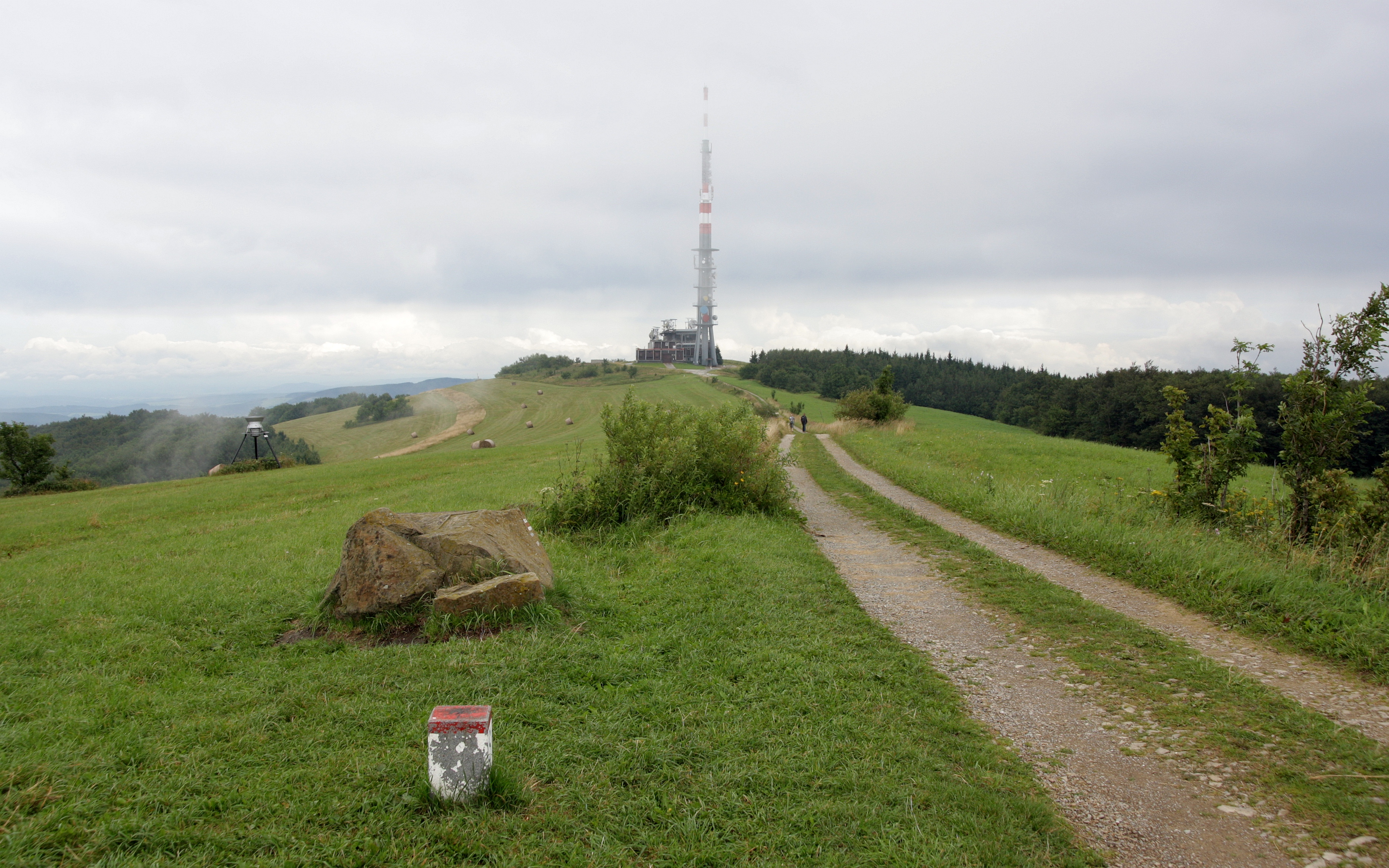

Highest point
- Elevation: 970 m (3,180 ft)
- Prominence: 570.4 m (1,871 ft)
- Isolation: 28.1 km (17.5 mi)
- Coordinates: 48°51′28″N 17°40′34″E

Geography
- Location within Slovakia
- Location: (flag) Czech Republic (flag) Slovakia
- Parent range: White Carpathians

Velká Javořina (Slovak: Veľká Javorina) is a mountain massif on the border of the Czech Republic and Slovakia. At 970 metres (3,180 ft) above sea level, it is the highest peak of the White Carpathians mountain range.

== Name ==
The name Javořina/Javorina is derived from the Slavic word javor ('maple'). In Slovakia, there is another peak with the name Velká Javořina, located in the Čergov mountains in eastern Slovakia, hence sometimes the distinguishing name Velká Javorina Bielokarpatská is used.

== Geological structure and soils ==
The massif of Velká Javořina is located in the southwest part of the White Carpathians and is built of flysch rocks with significant thickness, in which layers of sandstone (dating from the Upper Cretaceous to the Lower Paleocene) and fine-grained marine sediments (shales and marls) rhythmically repeat. The massif has the character of a mountainous erosional-denudational landscape. Its main feature is a significant surface area with large differences in elevation and steep terrain slopes. Convex landforms dominate over concave ones. The highest parts of the mountain are characterized by steep slopes facing north and northeast, descending to the Strání Valley with an average elevation of 479 meters above sea level. The summit itself has the shape of a broad, flat ridge covered with meadows, and the peak is located on the Slovak side.

A characteristic and very common phenomenon in areas with softer (clay) ground is landslides, causing significant damage to the forest stand. On stony-clay slopes with alluvial deposits, medium-heavy cambisols have developed (a type of rendzina).

== Hydrology ==
A characteristic feature of the massif is the rapid, stream-like flow of watercourses, which is typical of areas with significant elevation differences. The predominance of water erosion processes on the slopes over aggradation is significant.

Abundant mineral springs are found here, whose therapeutic properties are utilized in the Luhačovice spa town. On the northwest slope, at an altitude of 856 meters above sea level, the Velička stream emerges from a spring, which is a left tributary of the Morava river. The drainage divide between Velička and Sviniarský potok (a tributary of the Váh river) runs across the mountain.

== Climate ==
The massif lies in the zone of temperate climates. The climate of the central and northeastern parts of the White Carpathians is quite warm, cooler at higher altitudes, but much warmer than at comparable heights in northern and western Moravia. Although dry southeast winds prevail in the White Carpathians, especially in summer, on the highest peaks such as Velká Javořina, northeast winds prevail, more frequent also in the summer. Winds are the cause of strong wind erosion. Precipitation is usually more abundant than in southern Moravia.

The summit areas of the White Carpathians around Velká Javořina have characteristics of an alpine climate. The average temperature in July there is from 15 to 16 °C, in January from -3 to -4 °C, the number of summer days ranges from 10 to 30, the number of frost days from 140 to 160, and the average annual precipitation totals 850–1000 mm. The average annual atmospheric temperature is below 6 °C.

== Nature and its preservation ==
This area is one of the oldest protected areas in the Czech Republic; as early as 1909 its owners, the Liechtensteins, declared a protection regime similar to today's. The massif of Velká Javořina is located within the protected landscape areas of Bílé Karpaty on the Czech side and Biele Karpaty on the Slovak side. Additionally, both on the Czech and Slovak sides, small-scale protected areas have been designated (national nature reserve in the Czech Republic and nature reserve in Slovakia). In the Czech Republic the Javořina National Nature Reserve was established in 1951, with the highest category of protection, covering a preserved ecosystem of old-growth forest and mountain meadow, totaling 165.87 hectares since 2007, and in Slovakia, the Veľká Javorina Nature Reserve was established in 1988, covering 82.98 hectares. Both reserves are under strict protection, without interference in natural processes; the forest undergoes only natural renaturalisation.

=== Vegetation ===
The summit is covered with the only Nardetalia in the White Carpathians, dominated by Nardus stricta. Before the use of mineral fertilizers in the early 1990s, the elder-flowered orchid and Gentianella lutescens were abundant there. Currently, the meadow is returning to its natural state, as evidenced by findings of round headed orchid and willowherbs. At the edge of the reserve grows the giant bellflower, which has the only known occurrence in the White Carpathians.

The forests of the massif mainly consist of native species: sycamore maple (from which the mountain takes its name), common beech, and ash. The trees are of similar age. Due to the harsh microclimate of the mountain's summit, there are trees with original, twisted crown shapes in the highest parts. Among the rare plants found here are the alpine sow-thistle (Cicerbita alpina, the only occurrence in the White Carpathians). Also growing there are snowdrops, perennial honesty, and Corydalis.

=== Fauna ===
In the forests of Velká Javořina, one can find red deers, roe deers, and wild boars. Sometimes brown bears also wander there. Among the rarer species that inhabit this area are beetles such as the alpine longhorn beetle and Cerambyx scopolii, which feed on dead parts of trees. Rare spiders include tangle-web spiders, Tenuiphantes zimmermanni, Saloca kulczynskii from the sheet weaver family, as well as the fly Phaonia czernyi.

Among the birds reported are the white-backed woodpecker and the collared flycatcher. Around the springs and forest streams, one can find the fire salamander and the yellow-bellied toad.

== Limestone mining ==
Since the 18th century, limestone has been mined at the northwest foot of Velká Javořina. After grinding, it was supplied to the glassworks owned by the Liechtenstein family in the nearby village of Květné, which has been in operation since 1797. A mining settlement called Vápenky (now part of the municipality of Nová Lhota) was established at this location. Today, the former miners' cottages, built in a folk style, have been protected by the creation of a village monument zone.

== Tourism ==
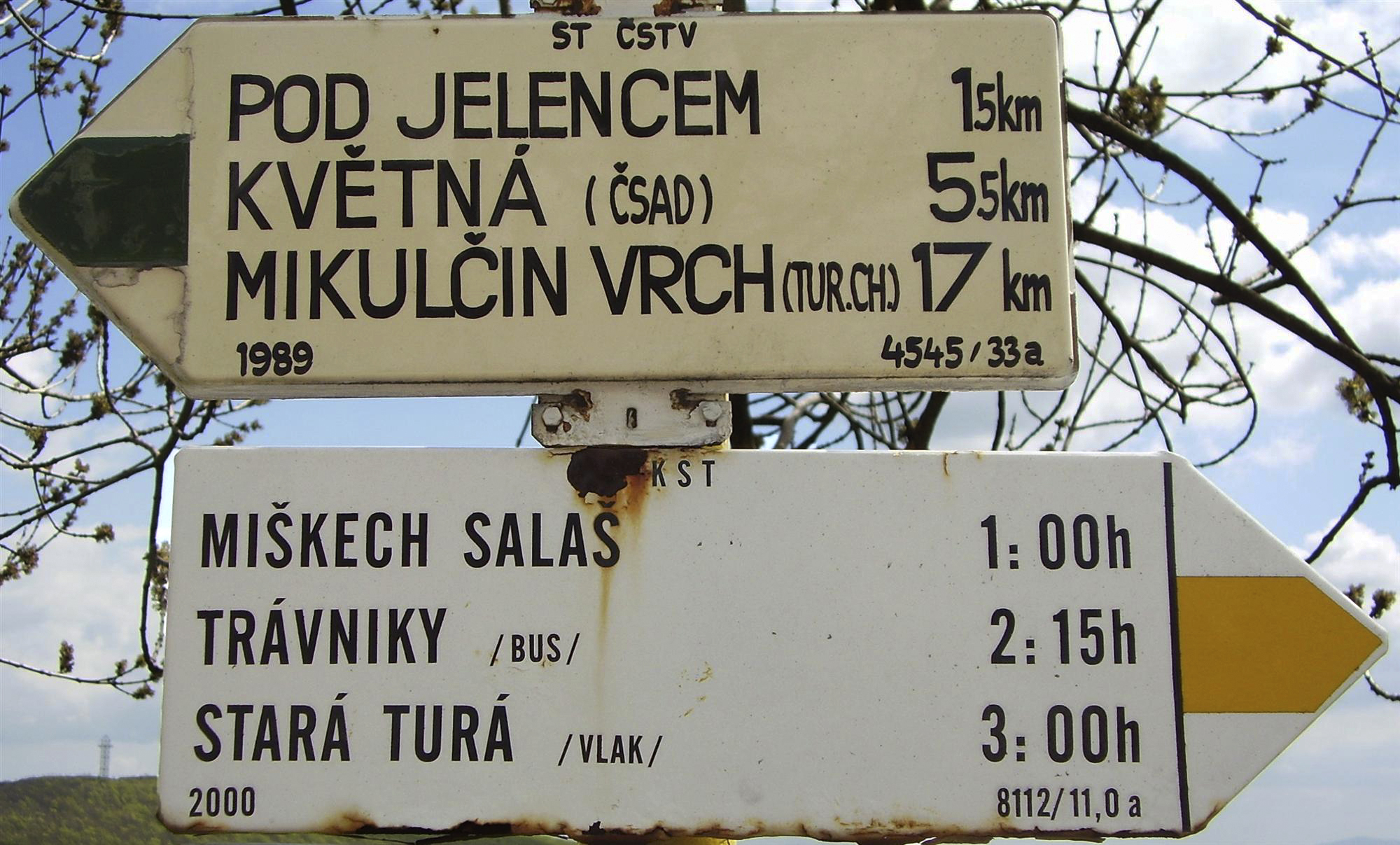
Signpost by the Holubyho chata with visible differences in marking of tourist trails: Czech (km) and Slovak (estimated walking time)

Several hiking trails lead to the summit, including periodically running along the same route the E8 European long distance path and Slovak trails: the red trail (0701h) and the Cesta hrdinov SNP, as well as a yellow cycling route from the Lubina (9 km long, with an elevation gain of 600 m). There are also Czech trails. During Austria-Hungary, the ridge served as the border between the Austrian part of the monarchy (including the Kingdom of Bohemia) and the Hungarian part (including Slovakia). A remnant of those times is one of the trails under Velká Javořina, called Maďarská cesta (Hungarian path). Using mountain trails, during World War II, about 2,500 people fleeing from the Protectorate of Bohemia and Moravia, occupied by Nazi Germany, were smuggled through the massif.

Popular ski resorts are located on the slopes, especially on the Slovak side, with the longest ski lift measuring 730 m. The mountain hut Holubyho chata, located at an altitude of 920 m above sea level, serves as a summer and winter accommodation base and a starting point for hikes. It is named after Jozef Ľudovít Holuby. (Note: Pastor Jozef Ľudovít Holuby (1836–1923), a Slovak independence activist, native of nearby Lubina, botanist and historian, for 48 years pastor in nearby Zemianskom Podhradí.)

== Summit development ==
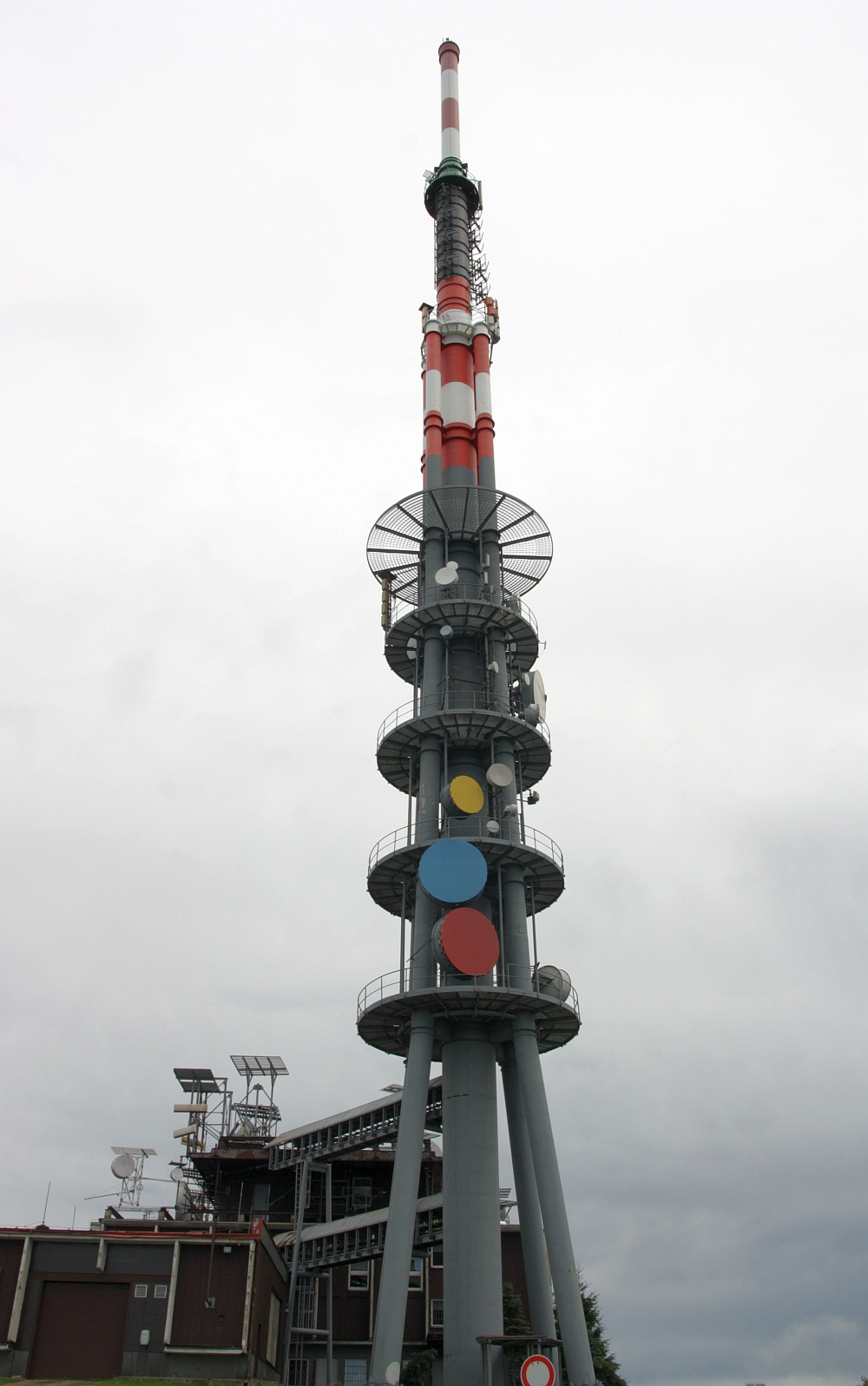
Transmitter at the top of the Velká Javořina

At the summit, there is a tower with a height of 134.5 m serving as a radio mast, television tower, and base transceiver station for cellular network.

In an adit near the summit, a seismic station was established in 1995 by scientists from the Department of Earth Physics at Masaryk University in Brno in cooperation with the Central Institute for Meteorology and Geodynamics in Vienna.

== Historical events ==
In July 1847, a group of Slovak students gathered on Velká Javořina to celebrate the publication of the first issue (3rd year) of the magazine Orol tatránski (Tatra Eagle), a literary supplement (biweekly) to the first Slovak-language periodical, Slovenskje národňje novini, edited by Ľudovít Štúr. The following year, another Slovak national leader, Jozef Miloslav Hurban, administered the oath to volunteers fighting during the Slovak Uprising against the Hungarians, who refused to recognize Slovak aspirations during the Spring of Nations.

=== Fraternity of Czechs and Slovaks ===
Patriotic meetings of Czechs, Slovaks, and Moravians also took place there, which is why Velká Javořina is considered one of the symbols of good relations between these nations. Evidence of this is a stone at the summit with a quote from J.M. Hurban: Tu bratia vždy sa stretať budú (Slovak) (English: Here brothers will always meet). On 1 September 1945, 25,000 Czechs and Slovaks gathered at the summit.

Every year in July, joint events are organized (Slovak: Slávnosti bratstva Čechov a Slovákov, Czech: Slavnosti bratrství Čechů a Slováků) with a rich program (including performances by folk groups from both countries, majorettes, meetings of mountain bikers). In addition, it has become a tradition to hike along the green trail from Květné to the "Vavrouška's Tomb" (a stone dedicated to Josef Vavrouška) (Note: Josef Vavroušek (1944–1995), ecologist and mountaineer, co-founder of the Civic Forum, Minister of Environmental Protection, died under an avalanche in the Parichvost Valley in the Tatra Mountains.) on every New Year's Eve, located on the opposite peak of Velká Javořina. The first meeting took place on New Year's Eve 1992 and was a spontaneous, social protest against the dissolution of Czechoslovakia, which took place the next day – 1 January 1993, against the significant part of public opinion.

=== Chapel project ===
The idea of supporting the brotherhood of these nations was to be dedicated to the chapel of Our Lady, Mother of Unity, which the Servant of God, Father Antonín Šuránek, wanted to build on the summit directly after World War II. For this idea, he obtained the support of Archbishop Leopold Prečan of Olomouc. During the period of seeking approval and support from the Ministry of Agriculture and local government offices, the first ecumenical service for Slovaks, Czechs, and Moravians was held on the summit on 27 July 1947. During the descent from it, Marie Málková from Nivnice was killed by a tree falling during a storm. At the urging of Father Šuránek, a wayside cross was erected at the accident site, and then in 1971, a stone chapel with a bronze relief was built.

However, the implementation of the chapel project on the summit became impossible after the full takeover of power by the communists in the 1948 Czechoslovak coup d'état and the resignation of President Edvard Beneš due to the resistance of the totalitarian regime.

=== Tales and legends ===
Mountains often have their own folk legends. One tells of a dead rooster that came back to life and crowed to drive the Turks out of the country. Another story is about the bandit Jano Žuchli, who abducted the beautiful Anička from the Čachtice Castle (known for the infamous Elizabeth Báthory) and made her the queen of the mountains on Velká Javořina, endowing her with his wealth.
