= Nová Lhota =

- Municipality
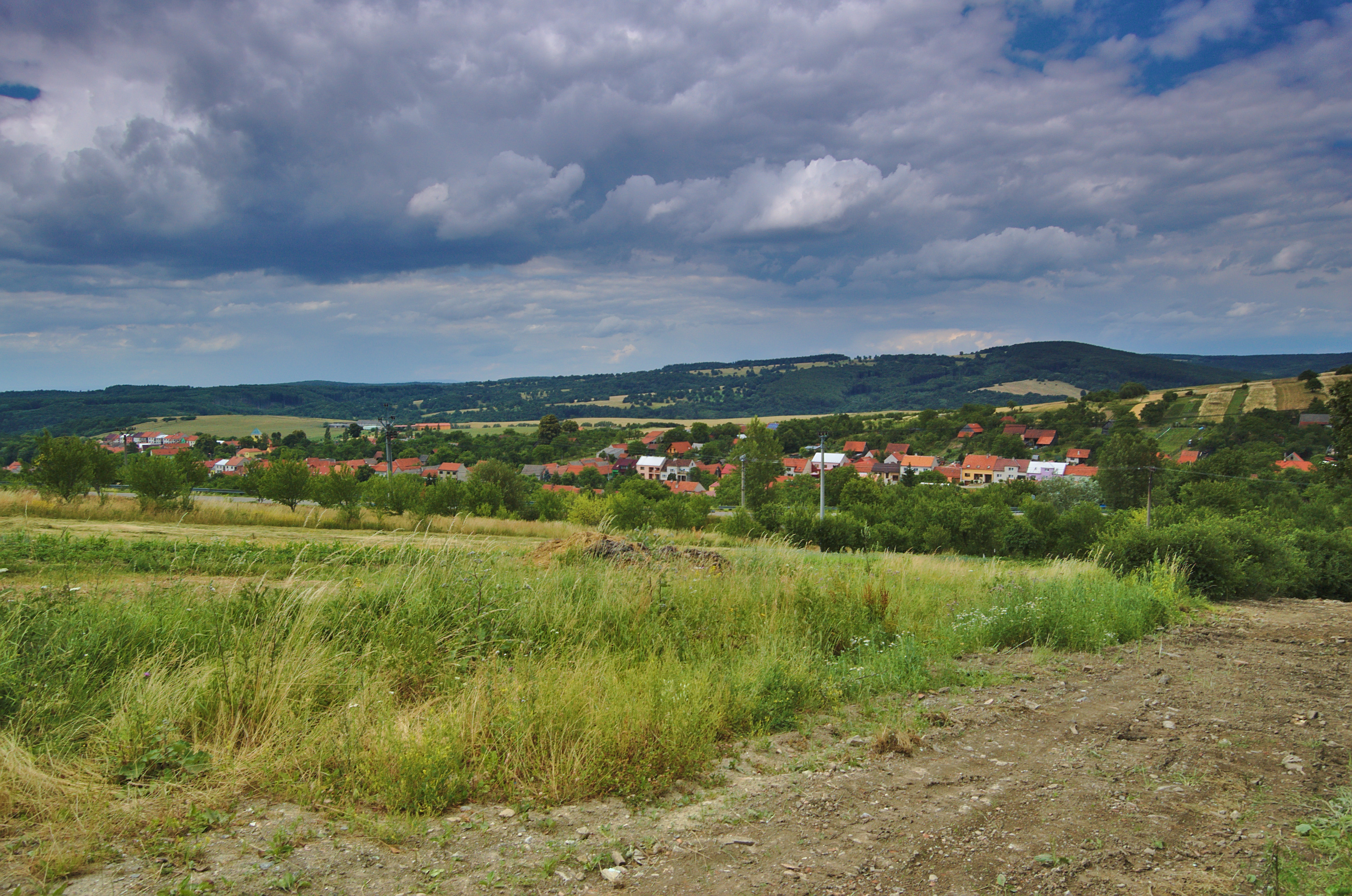
- View from the west

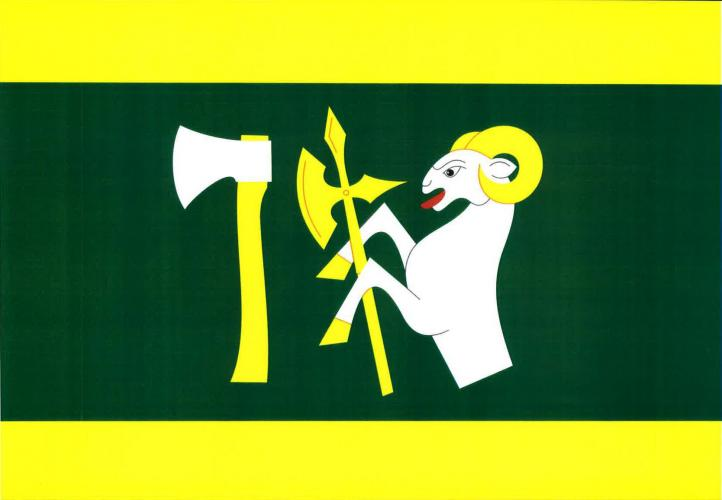
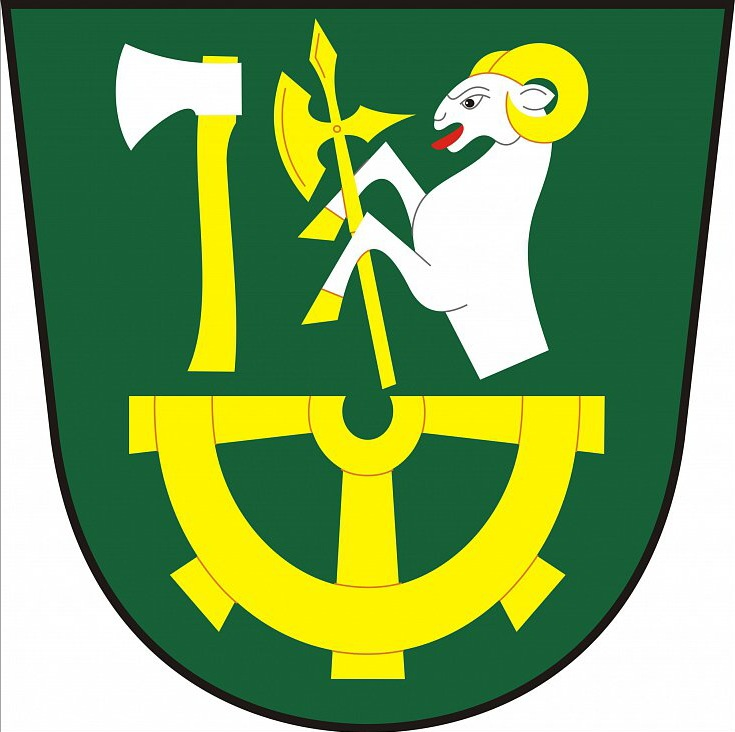
- Flag Coat of arms

- Location in the Czech Republic
- Coordinates: 48°51′39″N 17°35′36″E
- Country: Czech Republic
- Region: South Moravian
- District: Hodonín
- First mentioned: 1598

Area
  - Total: 25.84 km^{2} (9.98 sq mi)
- Elevation: 484 m (1,588 ft)

Population (2026-01-01)
  - Total: 610
  - Density: 24/km^{2} (61/sq mi)
- Time zone: UTC+1 (CET)
  - Summer (DST): UTC+2 (CEST)
- Postal code: 696 75
- Website: www.obecnovalhota.cz

Nová Lhota (German: Neu Lhotta) is a municipality and village in Hodonín District in the South Moravian Region of the Czech Republic. It has about 600 inhabitants.

Nová Lhota, a part of traditional ethnographic region Horňácko, lies approximately 35 kilometres (22 mi) east of Hodonín, 82 km (51 mi) south-east of Brno, and 268 km (167 mi) south-east of Prague.

== Administrative division ==
Nová Lhota consists of two municipal parts (in brackets population according to the 2021 census):

- Nová Lhota (587)
- Vápenky (24)

== Demographics ==
Historical population
Year	Pop.	±%
1869	1,215	—
1880	1,202	−1.1%
1890	1,281	+6.6%
1900	1,413	+10.3%
1910	1,472	+4.2%
1921	1,342	−8.8%
1930	1,572	+17.1%
1950	1,235	−21.4%
1961	1,468	+18.9%
1970	1,266	−13.8%
1980	1,109	−12.4%
1991	932	−16.0%
2001	789	−15.3%
2011	665	−15.7%
2021	611	−8.1%
Source: Censuses
