= White Carpathians =

Mountain range in the Czech Republic and Slovakia

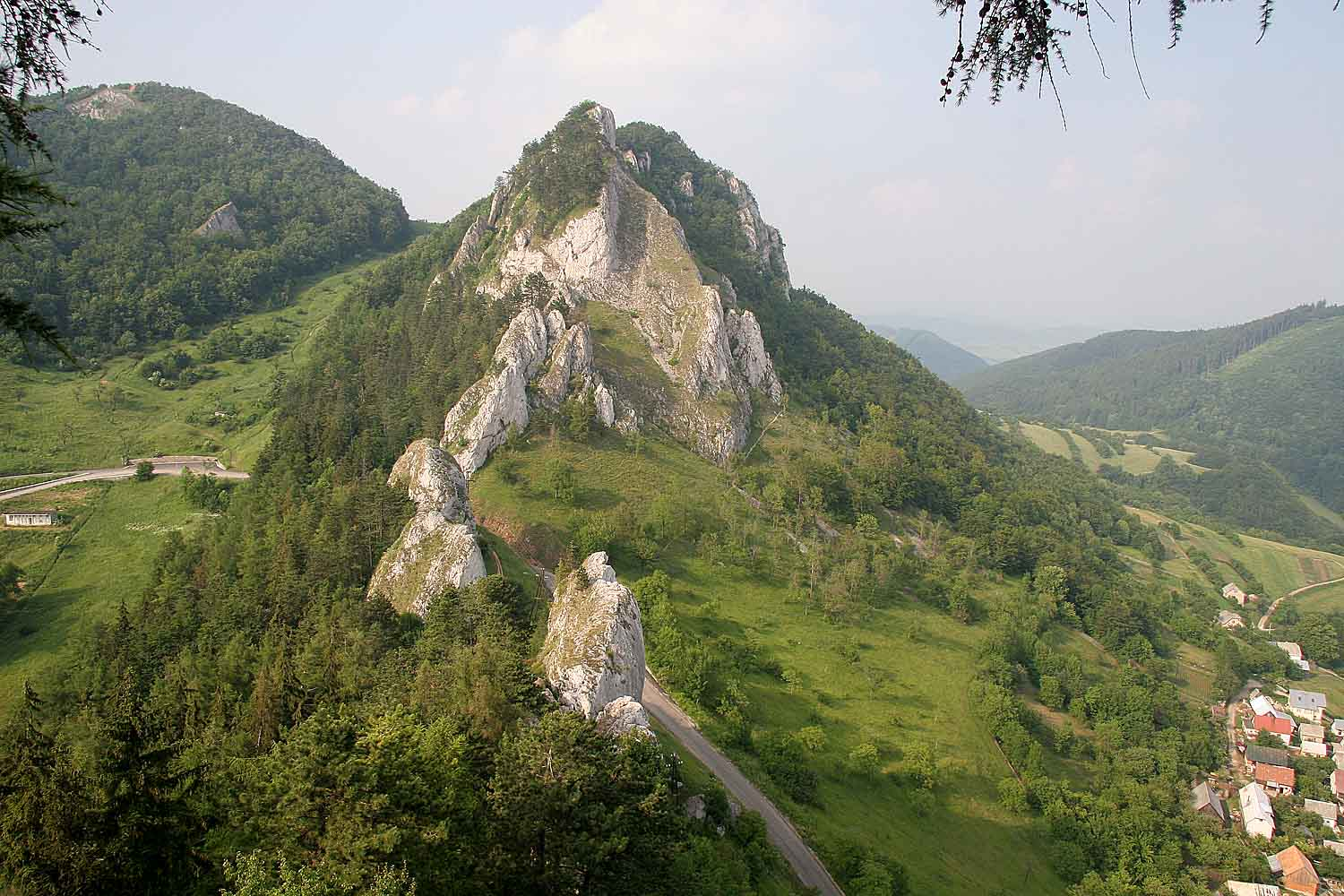
- Vršatec klippe near Vršatské Podhradie

Highest point
- Peak: Velká Javořina
- Elevation: 970 m (3,180 ft)
- Coordinates: 48°51′27″N 17°40′29″E

Geography
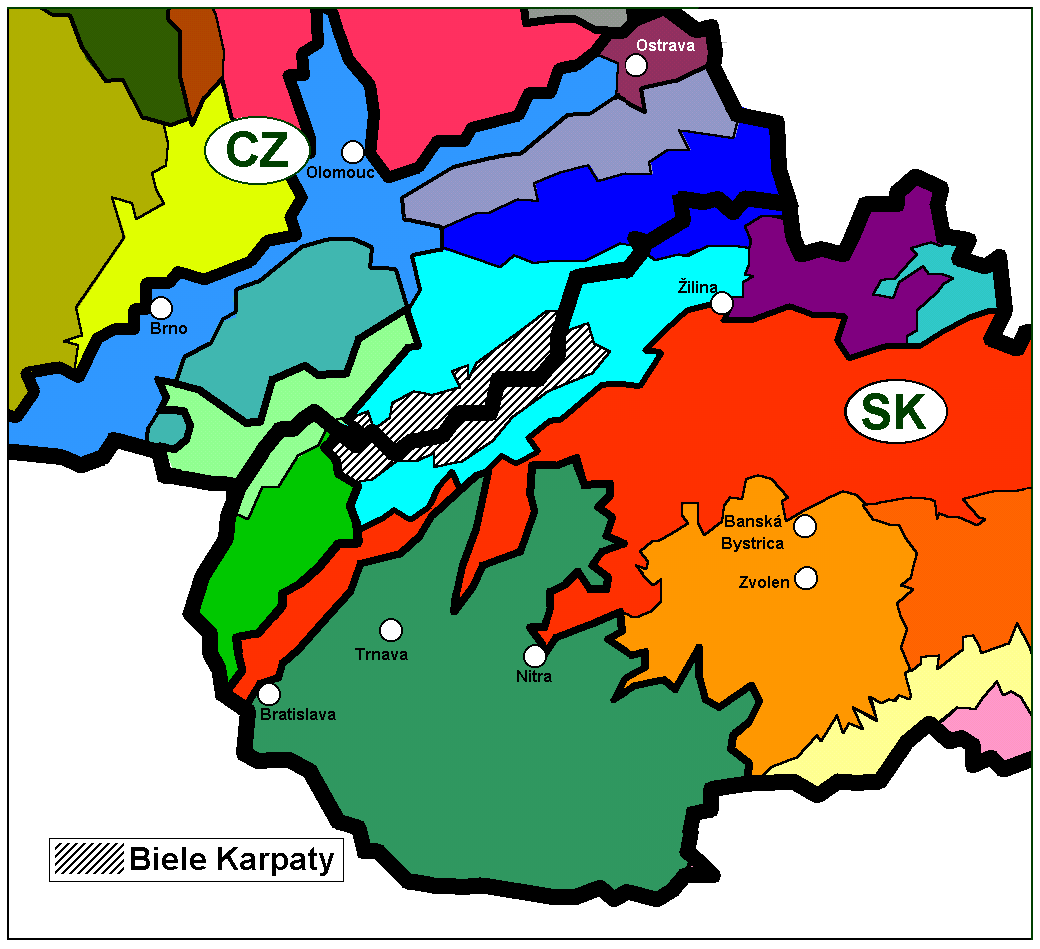
- White Carpathians within the geomorphological division of Slovakia and the Czech Republic
- Countries: Slovakia; Czech Republic
- Range coordinates: 49°N 18°E
- Parent range: Slovak-Moravian Carpathians

The White Carpathians (Czech: Bílé Karpaty; Slovak: Biele Karpaty; German: Weiße Karpaten) are a mountain range on the border of the Czech Republic and Slovakia, part of the Carpathians.

They are part of the macroregion of Slovak-Moravian Carpathians, stretching from the Váh river and the Little Carpathians in the south along the border between the Czech Republic and Slovakia to the Morava and the Javorníky range in the north.

The mean elevation is 473 m (1,552 ft) and the highest peaks are:

- Velká Javořina/Veľká Javorina, 970 m (3,180 ft)
- Chmeľová, 925 m (3,035 ft)
- Jelenec, 925 m (3,035 ft)
- Velký Lopeník/Veľký Lopeník, 911 m (2,989 ft)
- Kobylinec, 911 m (2,989 ft)

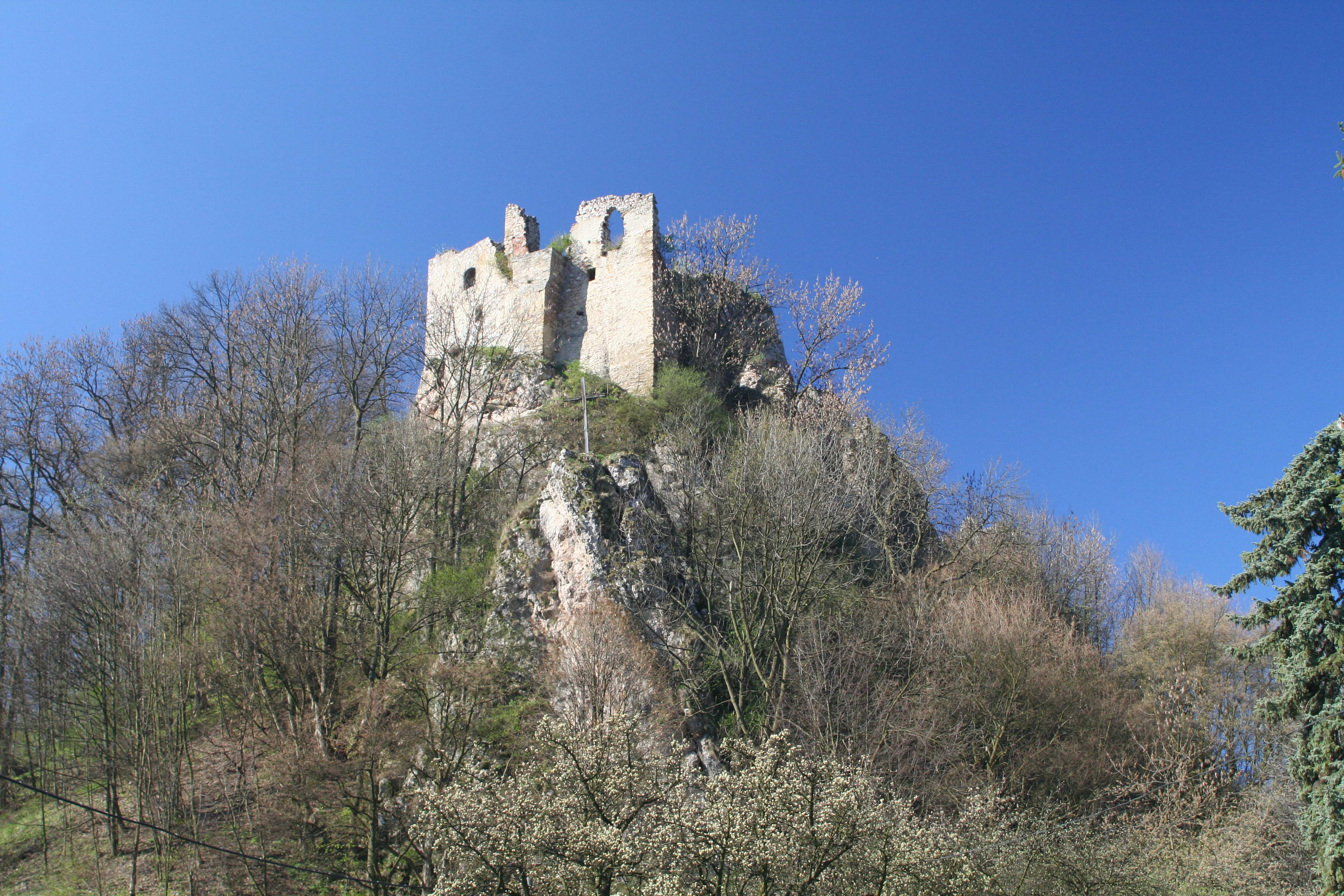
The ruins of Lednica Castle

The landscape is protected on both sides of the mountains: Biele Karpaty Protected Landscape Area in Slovakia, founded in 1979, and Bílé Karpaty Protected Landscape Area in the Czech Republic, founded in 1980, a Man and Biosphere Reserve since 1996. The areas contain a wide variety of fauna and flora. Some species found there are endemic, especially some types of orchids which grow only in the meadows of the White Carpathians.

Lednica Castle is perhaps the most inaccessible one among the castles in Slovakia. It was built in the middle of the 13th century and was the seat of the Lednice estate. Austrian imperial troops destroyed it at the beginning of the 18th century during Rákóczi's War of Independence. Only the remains of walls survive.
