= Krhov =

Krhov may refer to places in the Czech Republic:

- Krhov (Blansko District), a municipality and village in the South Moravian Region
- Krhov (Třebíč District), a municipality and village in the Vysočina Region
- Krhov, a village and part of Bojkovice in the Zlín Region
