= Hradčovice =

- Municipality
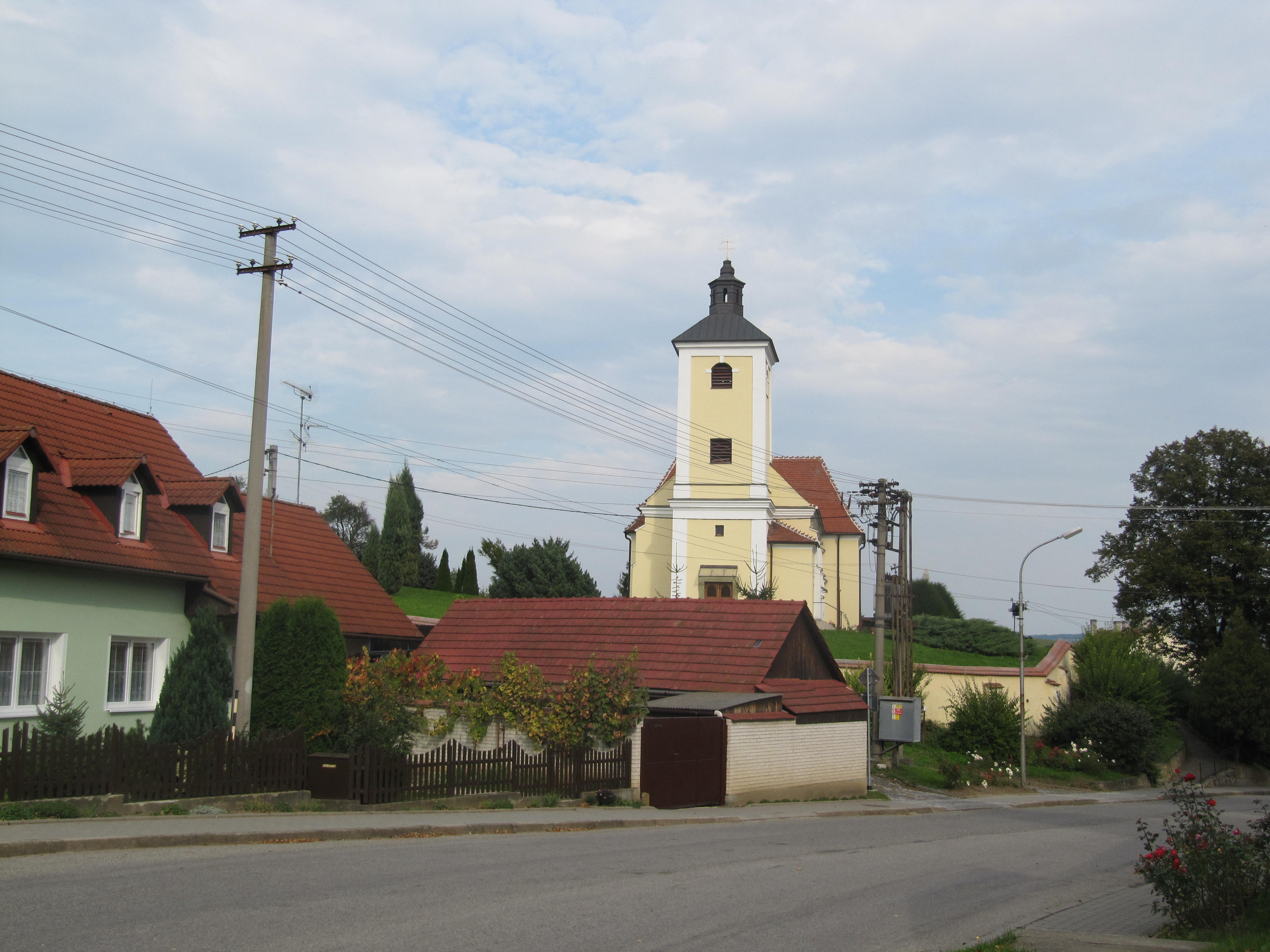
- Church of All Saints

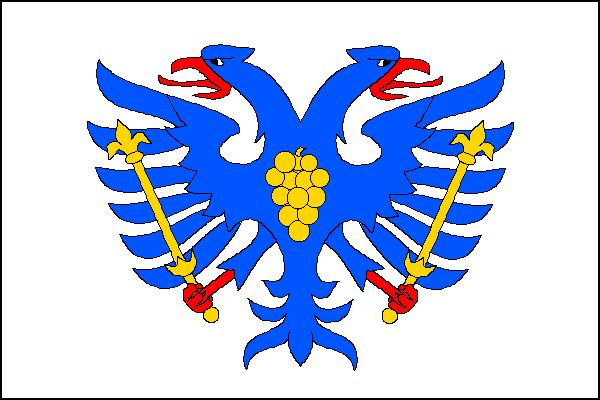
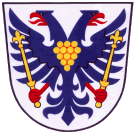
- Flag Coat of arms

- Location in the Czech Republic
- Coordinates: 49°2′59″N 17°34′56″E
- Country: Czech Republic
- Region: Zlín
- District: Uherské Hradiště
- First mentioned: 1247

Area
  - Total: 9.27 km^{2} (3.58 sq mi)
- Elevation: 198 m (650 ft)

Population (2026-01-01)
  - Total: 1,003
  - Density: 108/km^{2} (280/sq mi)
- Time zone: UTC+1 (CET)
  - Summer (DST): UTC+2 (CEST)
- Postal code: 687 33
- Website: www.hradcovice.cz

Hradčovice (German: Radischowitz) is a municipality and village in Uherské Hradiště District in the Zlín Region of the Czech Republic. It has about 1,000 inhabitants.

== Administrative division ==
Hradčovice consists of two municipal parts (in brackets population according to the 2021 census):

- Hradčovice (678)
- Lhotka (280)

== Geography ==
Hradčovice is located about 8 kilometres (5 mi) east of Uherské Hradiště and 20 km (12 mi) south of Zlín. It lies in the Vizovice Highlands. The highest point is the hill Rovná hora at 351 m (1,152 ft) above sea level. The municipality is situated on the right bank of the Olšava River.

== History ==
The first written mention of Hradčovice is from 1247, when Duke Ulrich III donated part of the village to the church. The village of Lhotka was first mentioned in 1374. From the 15th century until the early 17th century, the estate was owned by the Lords of Kunovice. At the beginning of the 17th century, the estate was bought by the Kaunitz family, which owned it until the end of the 18th century.

== Demographics ==
Historical population

Year	Pop.	±%
1869	760	—
1880	847	+11.4%
1890	946	+11.7%
1900	978	+3.4%
1910	1,104	+12.9%

Year	Pop.	±%
1921	1,135	+2.8%
1930	1,094	−3.6%
1950	1,060	−3.1%
1961	1,165	+9.9%
1970	1,137	−2.4%

Year	Pop.	±%
1980	1,026	−9.8%
1991	1,020	−0.6%
2001	969	−5.0%
2011	975	+0.6%
2021	958	−1.7%

Source: Censuses

== Transport ==
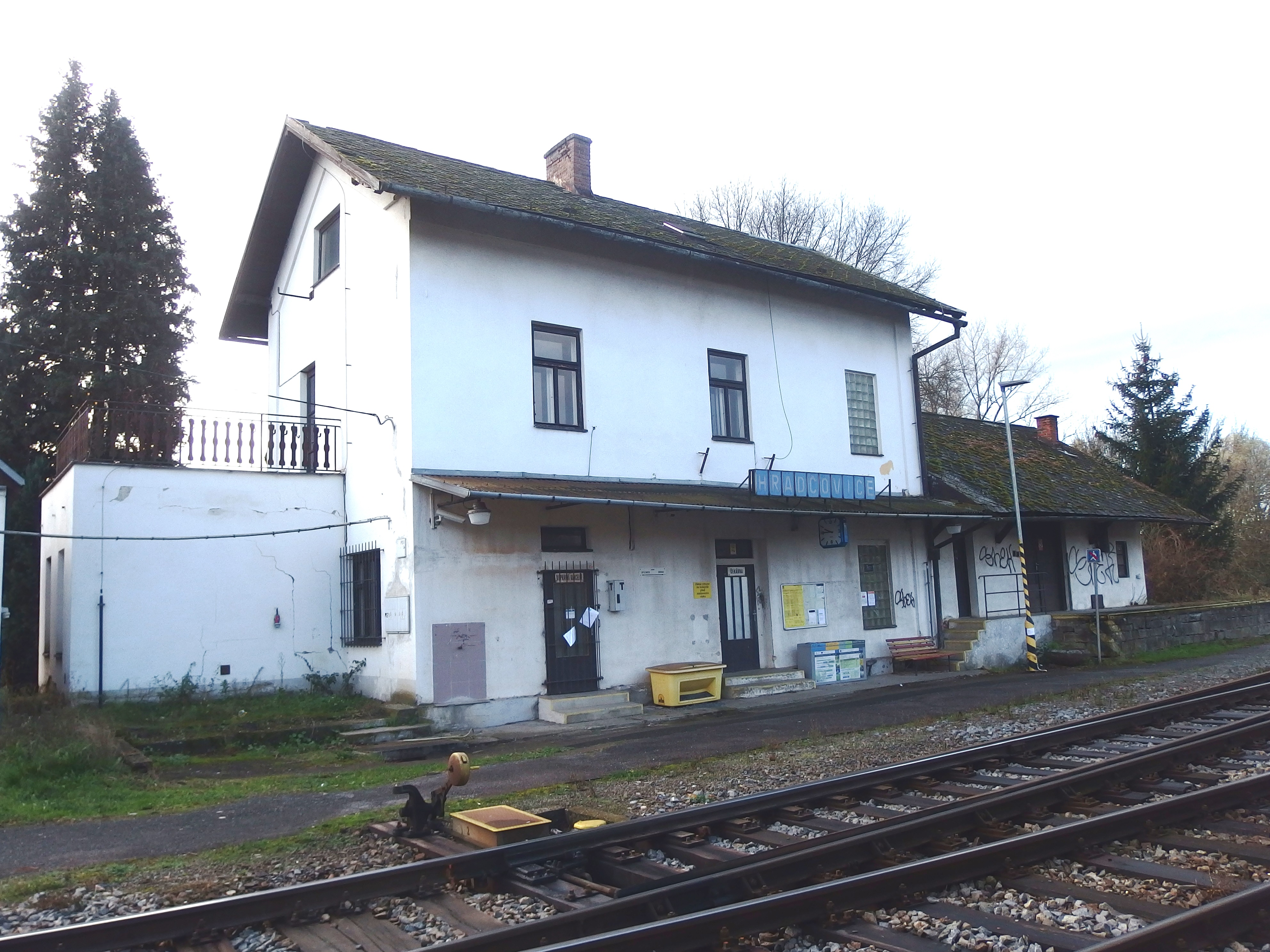
Train station

The I/50 road (part of the European route E50), which connects Brno with the Czech–Slovak border in Starý Hrozenkov via Uherské Hradiště, runs through the southern part of the municipality.

Hradčovice is located on the railway line Staré Město–Bylnice.

== Sights ==
The main landmark of Hradčovice is the Church of All Saints. It was built in the early Baroque style around 1670, but it has a medieval core from the second half of the 13th century. The church was modified to its present form after 1757.
