= Uherský Brod =

Town in Zlín Region, Czech Republic

- Town
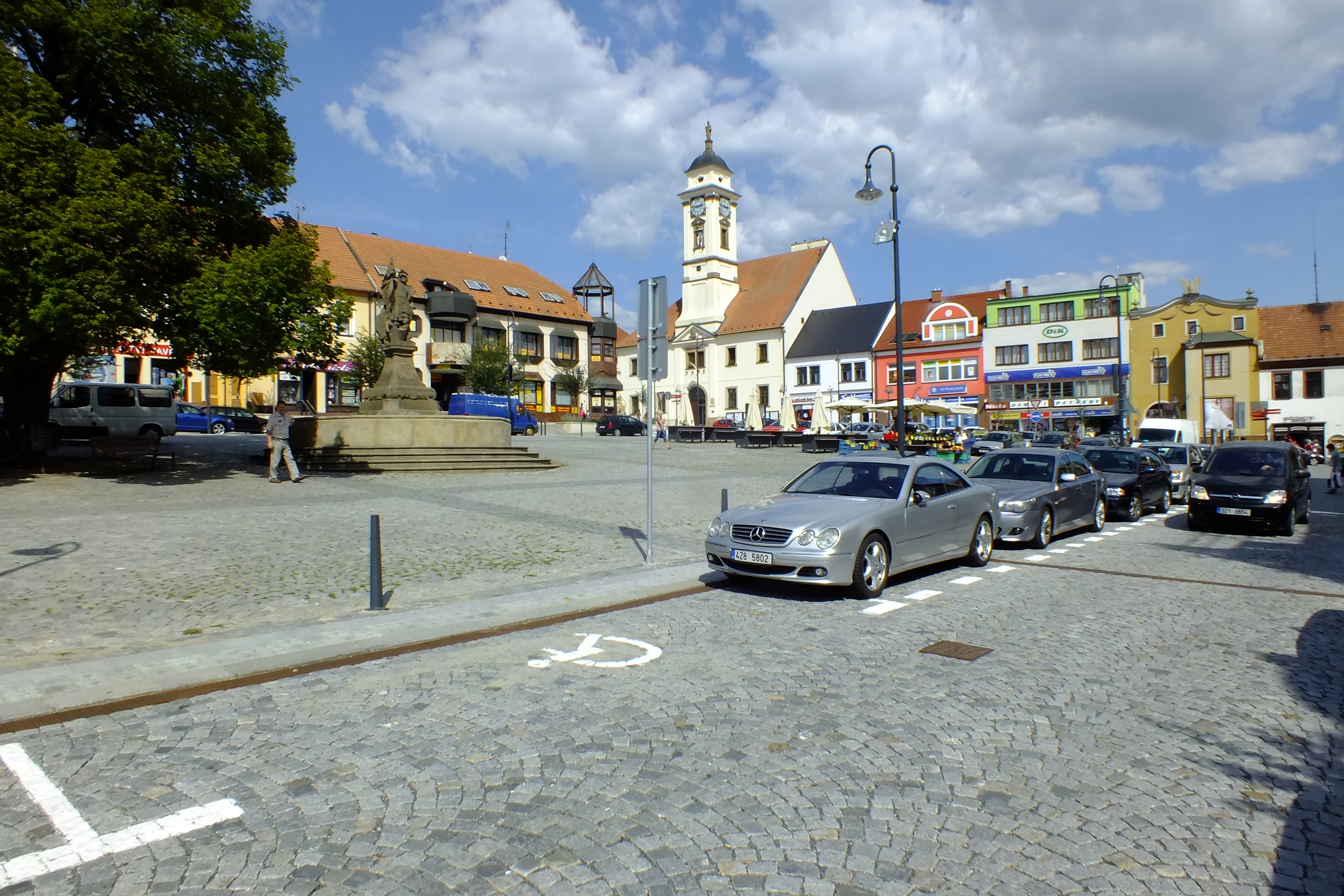
- Masarykovo náměstí and the town hall

- Flag Coat of arms

- Location in the Czech Republic
- Coordinates: 49°1′30″N 17°38′50″E
- Country: Czech Republic
- Region: Zlín
- District: Uherské Hradiště
- First mentioned: 1030

Government
  - Mayor: Ferdinand Kubáník (KDU-ČSL)

Area
  - Total: 52.06 km^{2} (20.10 sq mi)
- Elevation: 251 m (823 ft)

Population (2026-01-01)
  - Total: 16,280
  - Density: 312.7/km^{2} (809.9/sq mi)
- Time zone: UTC+1 (CET)
  - Summer (DST): UTC+2 (CEST)
- Postal codes: 687 34, 688 01
- Website: www.ub.cz

Uherský Brod (Czech pronunciation: [ˈuɦɛrskiː ˈbrot]; German: Ungarisch Brod) is a town in Uherské Hradiště District in the Zlín Region of the Czech Republic. It has about 16,000 inhabitants. The town is located on the Olšava River in the Vizovice Highlands.

The historic centre of Uherský Brod is well preserved and is protected as an urban monument zone. The main landmarks of the town centre are the Church of the Immaculate Conception and the Church of the Assumption of the Virgin Mary. Uherský Brod is known as the place where the philosopher and pedagogue John Amos Comenius lived, and the town museum and secondary school bear his name.

== Administrative division ==
Uherský Brod consists of five municipal parts (in brackets population according to the 2021 census):

- Uherský Brod (13,267)
- Havřice (804)
- Maršov (23)
- Těšov (975)
- Újezdec (1,024)

== Etymology ==
The name Uherský Brod literally means 'Hungarian ford' in Czech. It refers to its historical location near a ford across the river Olšava and near the border with the Kingdom of Hungary. The German name is Ungarish Brod and the Hungarian name is Magyarbród, both meaning 'Hungarian Brod'.

== Geography ==
Uherský Brod is located about 13 kilometres (8 mi) southeast of Uherské Hradiště and 22 km (14 mi) south of Zlín. It lies in the Vizovice Highlands. The highest point is at 389 m (1,276 ft) above sea level. The Olšava River flows through the town.

== History ==
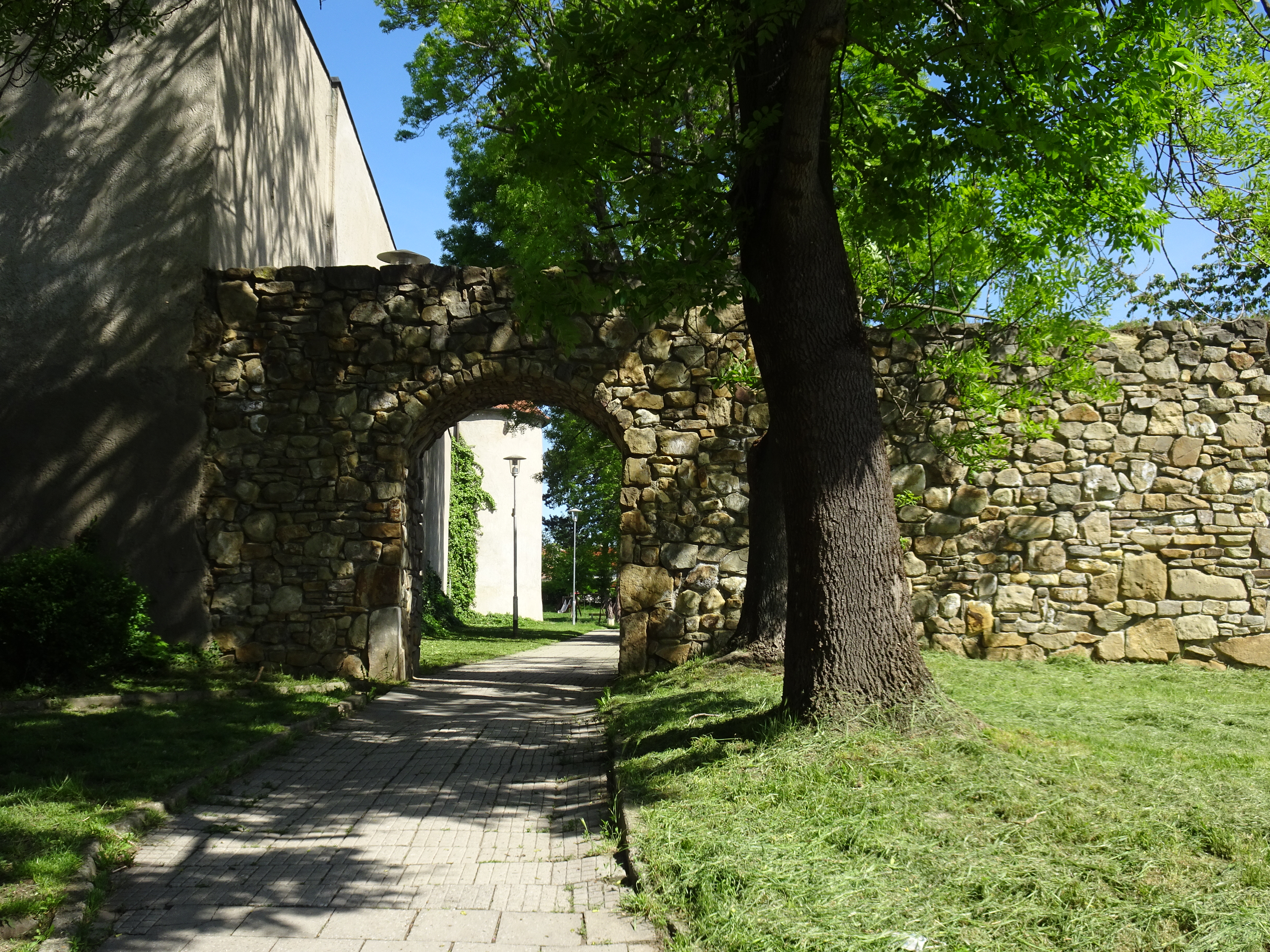
Town walls

The first written mentions of Uherský Brod are from 1030 and 1048, when customs were collected here in a locality called Na Brodě. According to Hungarian historiography, a fortress was founded here in 1049 by King Andrew I of Hungary on what was then the Hungarian–Bohemian border, primarily as a measure against potential German attacks. Location by trade routes and suitable climatic conditions led to the development of the settlement called Brod to a town. In 1272, the village was promoted to a royal town by King Ottokar II. In 1275, the name Uherský Brod was first used.

Uherský Brod became a border fortress town which had to face the Hungarian invasions. During the Hussite Wars, the town surrendered to the Hussites and became their military base. After the Hussite Wars, the town suffered from the war between George of Poděbrady and Matthias Corvinus. Uherský Brod was acquired by the Lords of Kunovice in 1506 and during their rule, the town prospered and developed.

The good times came to an end in the early 17th century when Hungarians started to attack it in a series of invasions. In 1611, the town was bought by the Kaunitz family and began to lose its economic and cultural significance. In the 17th century, the town continued to suffer from wars and plague epidemics. Uherský Brod recovered in the 18th century and prosperity was affected not even by the large fire in 1735, the invasion of the Prussian Army in 1741–1742 and by cholera epidemic in 1757.

In the 19th century, German and Jewish communities began to grow. In the second half of the 19th century, the town was transformed by industrial development but managed to retain its character. In 1883–1888, the railway was built.

On 24 February 2015, a shooting occurred at a restaurant in Uherský Brod. Nine people were killed, including the gunman.

== Demographics ==
Historical population

Year	Pop.	±%
1869	5,855	—
1880	6,492	+10.9%
1890	6,935	+6.8%
1900	7,399	+6.7%
1910	8,014	+8.3%

Year	Pop.	±%
1921	8,384	+4.6%
1930	8,821	+5.2%
1950	9,856	+11.7%
1961	12,565	+27.5%
1970	14,406	+14.7%

Year	Pop.	±%
1980	17,459	+21.2%
1991	17,721	+1.5%
2001	17,592	−0.7%
2011	16,758	−4.7%
2021	16,093	−4.0%

Source: Censuses

== Economy ==
One of the largest employers in the region is Česká zbrojovka Uherský Brod, a firearms manufacturer. The engineering industry is also represented by Slovácké strojírny a.s., which was founded here in 1951.

== Transport ==
The I/50 road (part of the European route E50), which connects Brno with the Czech–Slovak border in Starý Hrozenkov, runs through the town.

Uherský Brod is located on the Prague–Luhačovice railway line.

== Education ==
There is a gymnasium that bear name of John Amos Comenius. There are also three other secondary and vocational schools.

== Sport ==
Uherský Brod is home to the football club ČSK Uherský Brod. It plays in lower amateur tiers.

== Sights ==
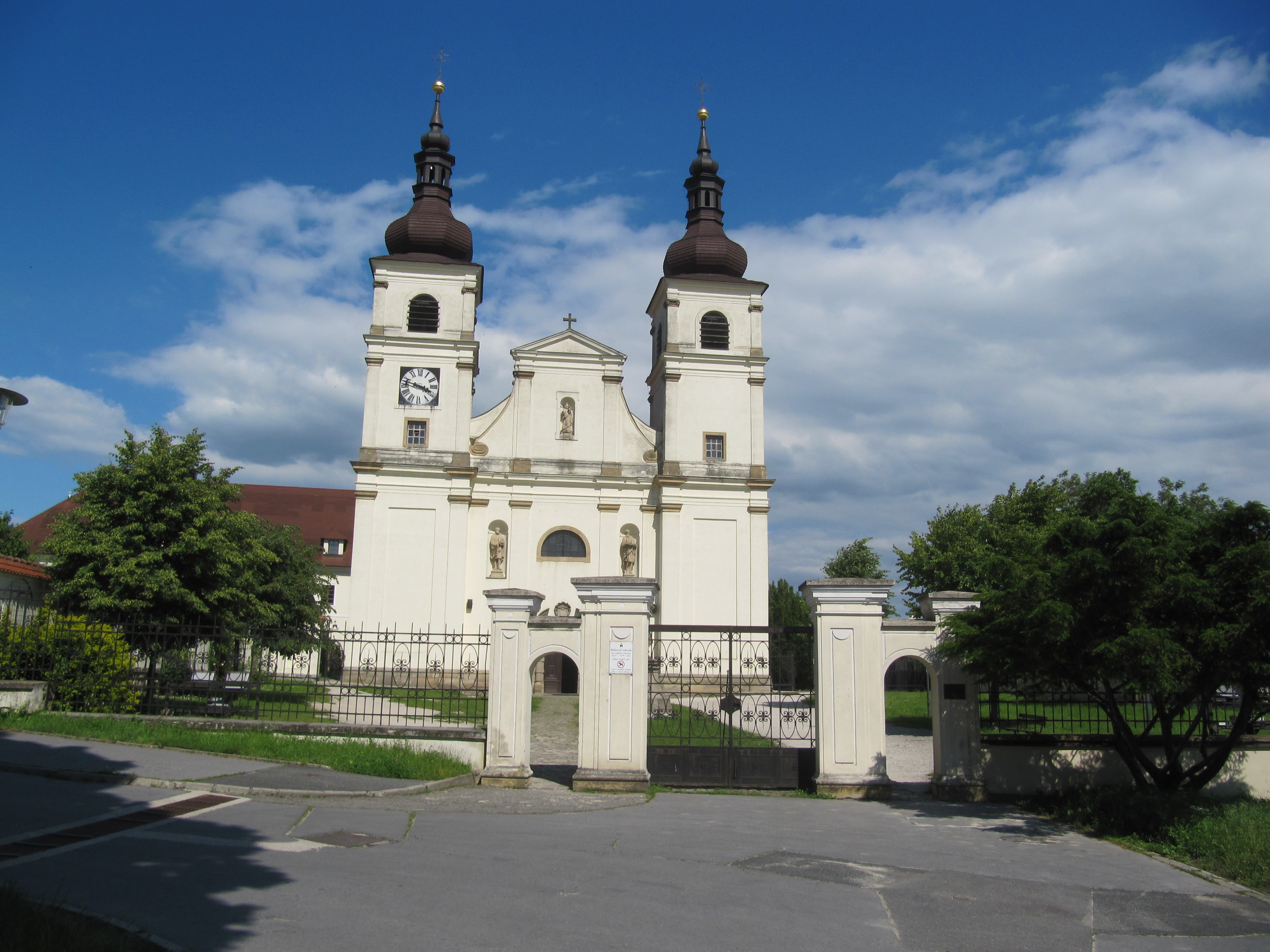
Dominican convent with the Church of the Assumption of the Virgin Mary

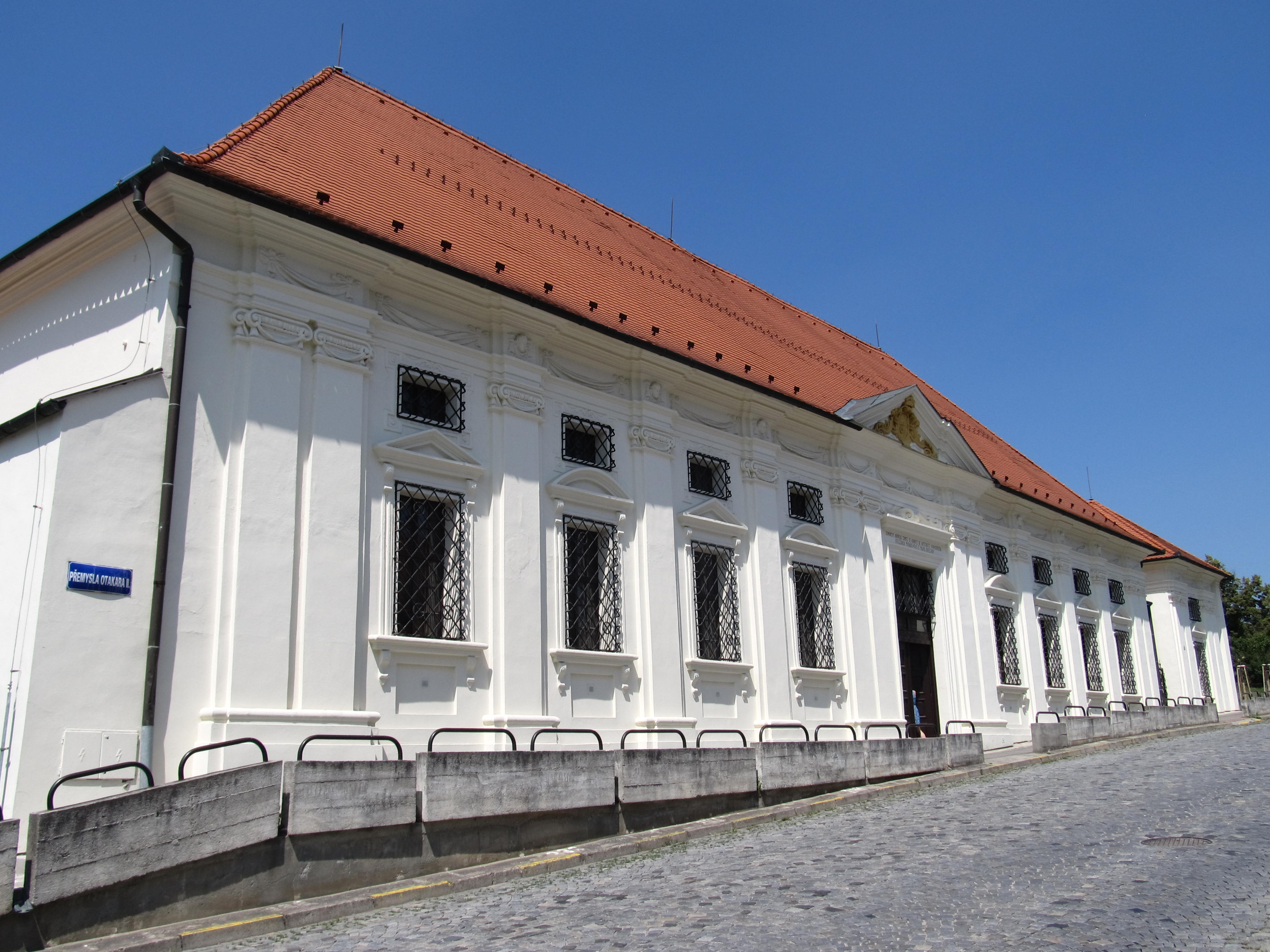
Uherský Brod Castle

The main landmark of the main square Masarykovo náměstí is the Church of the Immaculate Conception. This three-nave Baroque church was designed by Domenico Martinelli and built in 1717–1733. The 60 metres (200 ft)-high tower was added in 1879–1881.

One of the oldest and largest monument in the region is the Dominican convent with the Church of the Assumption of the Virgin Mary. The original Gothic church from the early 14th century was much higher than the current structure. After it was damaged and burned down during the wars, it was rebuilt in the early Baroque style in the 1670s and the 1680s.

The Kounická street between the town square and the convent includes two important and valuable buildings of the town, the town hall and the manor house. The original late Gothic town hall was demolished in 1556 and replaced by the Renaissance one. It was rebuilt in the Baroque style in 1703–1715. The large Baroque manor house has preserved Gothic-Renaissance core. The Baroque reconstruction was also made by design of Domenico Martinelli. It has an arcaded courtyard with copies of Renaissance columns. Today, the manor house serves the cultural and social purposes. There is a ceremonial hall, gallery, Gothic chapel of the Kaunitz family, library, and elementary art school.

A Baroque castle was built on the site of an old Gothic castle that was abandoned in the 17th century. Uherský Brod Castle was designed by D. Martinelli and was originally intended to be a large complex, however, after 1705, the construction did not continue and only a part was created. Today the castle houses the Museum of J. A. Comenius. Fragments of the town walls are preserved, especially in the neighbourhood of the castle. Three of four gates were demolished in 1874. The only preserved gate now forms the entrance to the Museum of J. A. Comenius.

On a hill above the town is an observatory from 1961, having been funded and built entirely by the town's residents. It also includes a planetarium in the town centre. The Planetary Trail is an educational trail with models of planets and the sun which runs through the town.

== Notable people ==
- John Amos Comenius (1592–1670), philosopher and pedagogue; possible birthplace, lived here
- Moses Samuel Zuckermandl (1836–1917), Czech-German rabbi and theologian
- Leo Jung (1892–1987), American rabbi
- Ladislav Boháč (1907–1978), actor
- Vlastimil Babula (born 1973), chess player

== Twin towns – sister cities ==
Uherský Brod is twinned with:

- Nové Mesto nad Váhom, Slovakia
- Šamorín, Slovakia
