= Záhorovice =

- Municipality
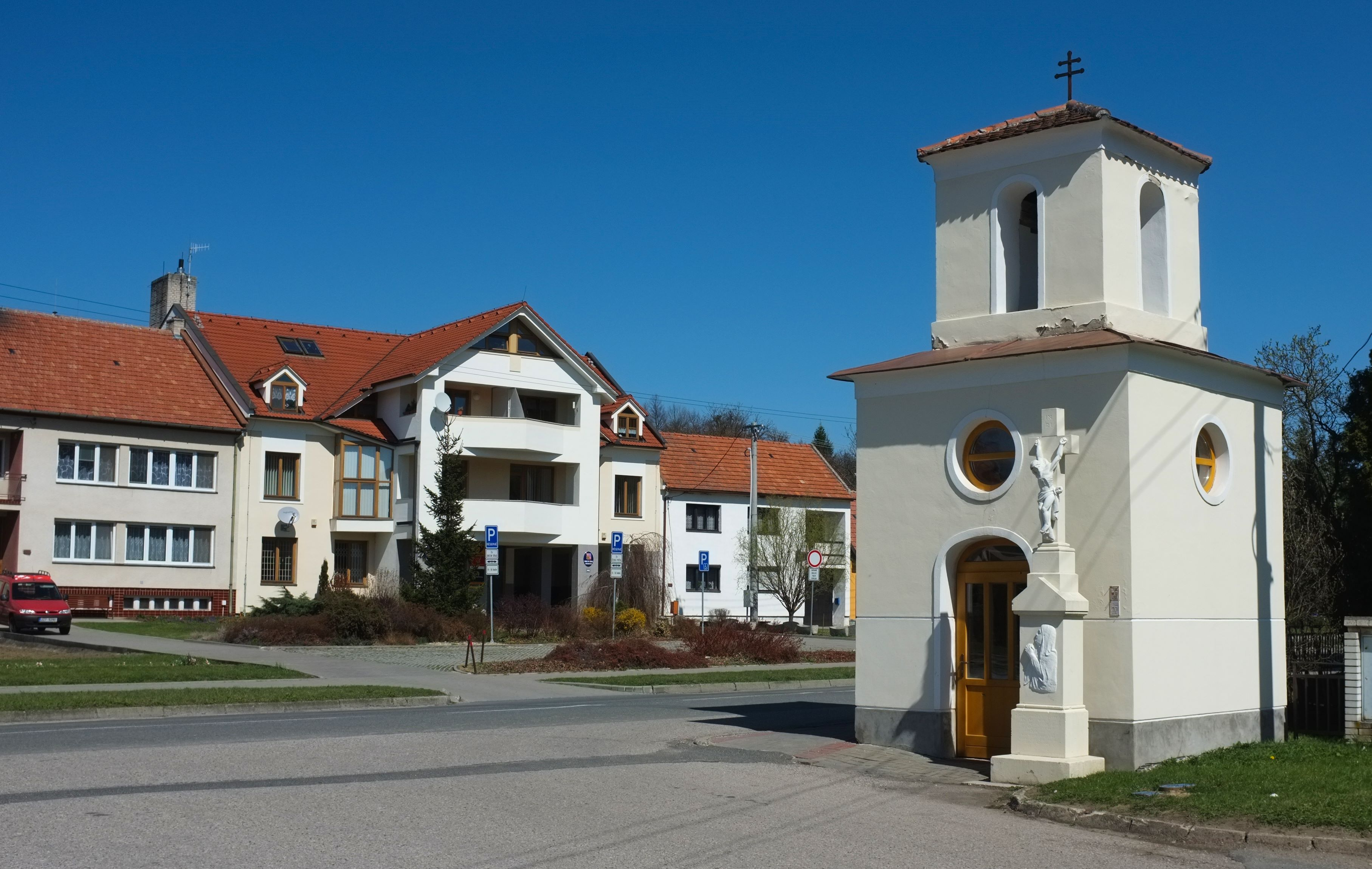
- Chapel and municipal office

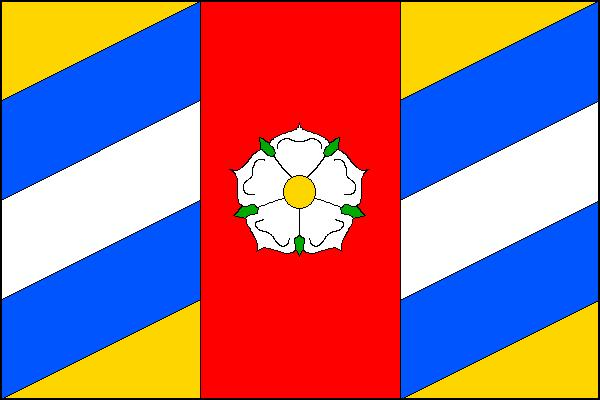
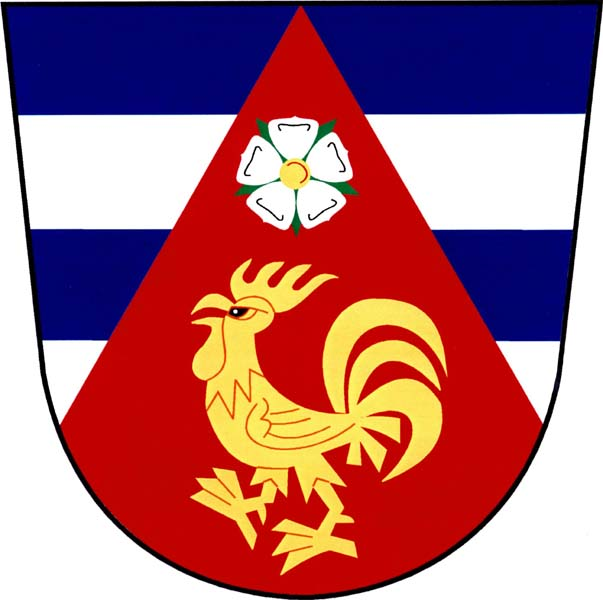
- Flag Coat of arms

- Location in the Czech Republic
- Coordinates: 49°1′22″N 17°46′45″E
- Country: Czech Republic
- Region: Zlín
- District: Uherské Hradiště
- First mentioned: 1373

Area
  - Total: 14.92 km^{2} (5.76 sq mi)
- Elevation: 248 m (814 ft)

Population (2026-01-01)
  - Total: 1,037
  - Density: 69.50/km^{2} (180.0/sq mi)
- Time zone: UTC+1 (CET)
  - Summer (DST): UTC+2 (CEST)
- Postal code: 687 71
- Website: www.zahorovice.cz

Záhorovice (German: Zahorowitz) is a municipality and village in Uherské Hradiště District in the Zlín Region of the Czech Republic. It has about 1,000 inhabitants.

== Geography ==
Záhorovice is located about 23 kilometres (14 mi) east of Uherské Hradiště and 24 km (15 mi) south of Zlín. It lies on the border between the Vizovice Highlands and White Carpathians. The highest point is the hill Valy at 470 m (1,542 ft) above sea level. The Olšava River flows through the municipality.

== Demographics ==
Historical population
Year	Pop.	±%
1869	879	—
1880	995	+13.2%
1890	1,059	+6.4%
1900	1,112	+5.0%
1910	1,133	+1.9%
1921	1,139	+0.5%
1930	1,195	+4.9%
1950	1,021	−14.6%
1961	1,209	+18.4%
1970	1,175	−2.8%
1980	1,082	−7.9%
1991	1,044	−3.5%
2001	1,068	+2.3%
2011	1,034	−3.2%
2021	947	−8.4%
Source: Censuses
