= Šumice (Uherské Hradiště District) =

- Municipality
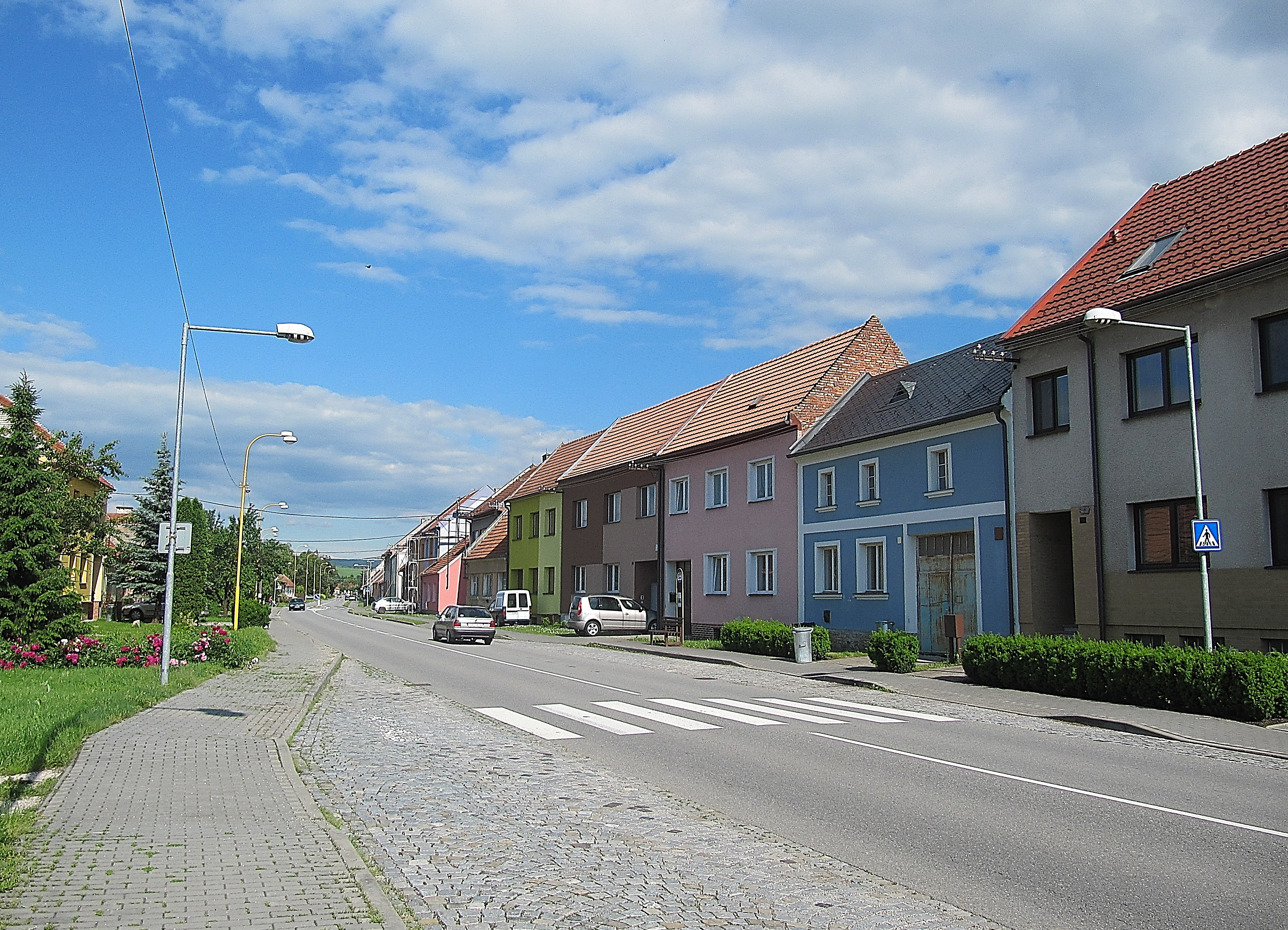
- Main street

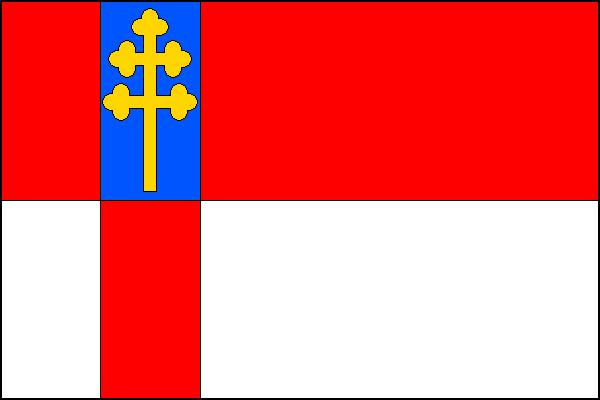
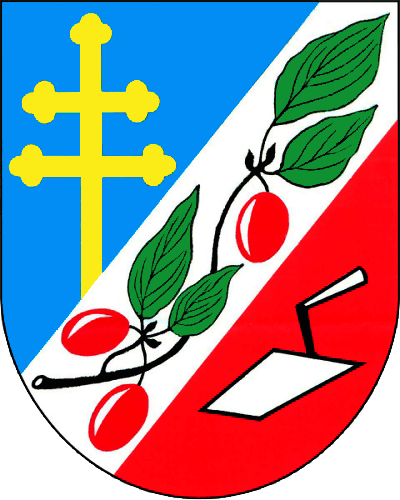
- Flag Coat of arms

- Location in the Czech Republic
- Coordinates: 49°1′43″N 17°43′19″E
- Country: Czech Republic
- Region: Zlín
- District: Uherské Hradiště
- First mentioned: 1380

Area
  - Total: 15.71 km^{2} (6.07 sq mi)
- Elevation: 225 m (738 ft)

Population (2026-01-01)
  - Total: 1,598
  - Density: 101.7/km^{2} (263.5/sq mi)
- Time zone: UTC+1 (CET)
  - Summer (DST): UTC+2 (CEST)
- Postal code: 687 31
- Website: www.sumice.cz

Šumice is a municipality and village in Uherské Hradiště District in the Zlín Region of the Czech Republic. It has about 1,600 inhabitants.

== Geography ==
Šumice is located about 18 kilometres (11 mi) east of Uherské Hradiště and 22 km (14 mi) south of Zlín. It lies in the Vizovice Highlands. The highest point is the hill Babí hora at 385 m (1,263 ft) above sea level. The Olšava River flows through the municipality.

== History ==
The first written mention of Šumice is from 1380.

== Demographics ==
Historical population

Year	Pop.	±%
1869	1,113	—
1880	1,173	+5.4%
1890	1,239	+5.6%
1900	1,305	+5.3%
1910	1,443	+10.6%

Year	Pop.	±%
1921	1,483	+2.8%
1930	1,471	−0.8%
1950	1,506	+2.4%
1961	1,701	+12.9%
1970	1,738	+2.2%

Year	Pop.	±%
1980	1,818	+4.6%
1991	1,816	−0.1%
2001	1,764	−2.9%
2011	1,631	−7.5%
2021	1,561	−4.3%

Source: Censuses

== Transport ==
Šumice is located on the railway line Staré Město–Bylnice.

== Sights ==
The main landmark of Šumice is the Church of the Assumption of the Virgin Mary. The original church was built in 1861, but it was destroyed during a violent storm. The current church was built in 1999.

== Notable people ==
- Jiří Bárta (1935–2012), pianist and composer
