= Olšava =

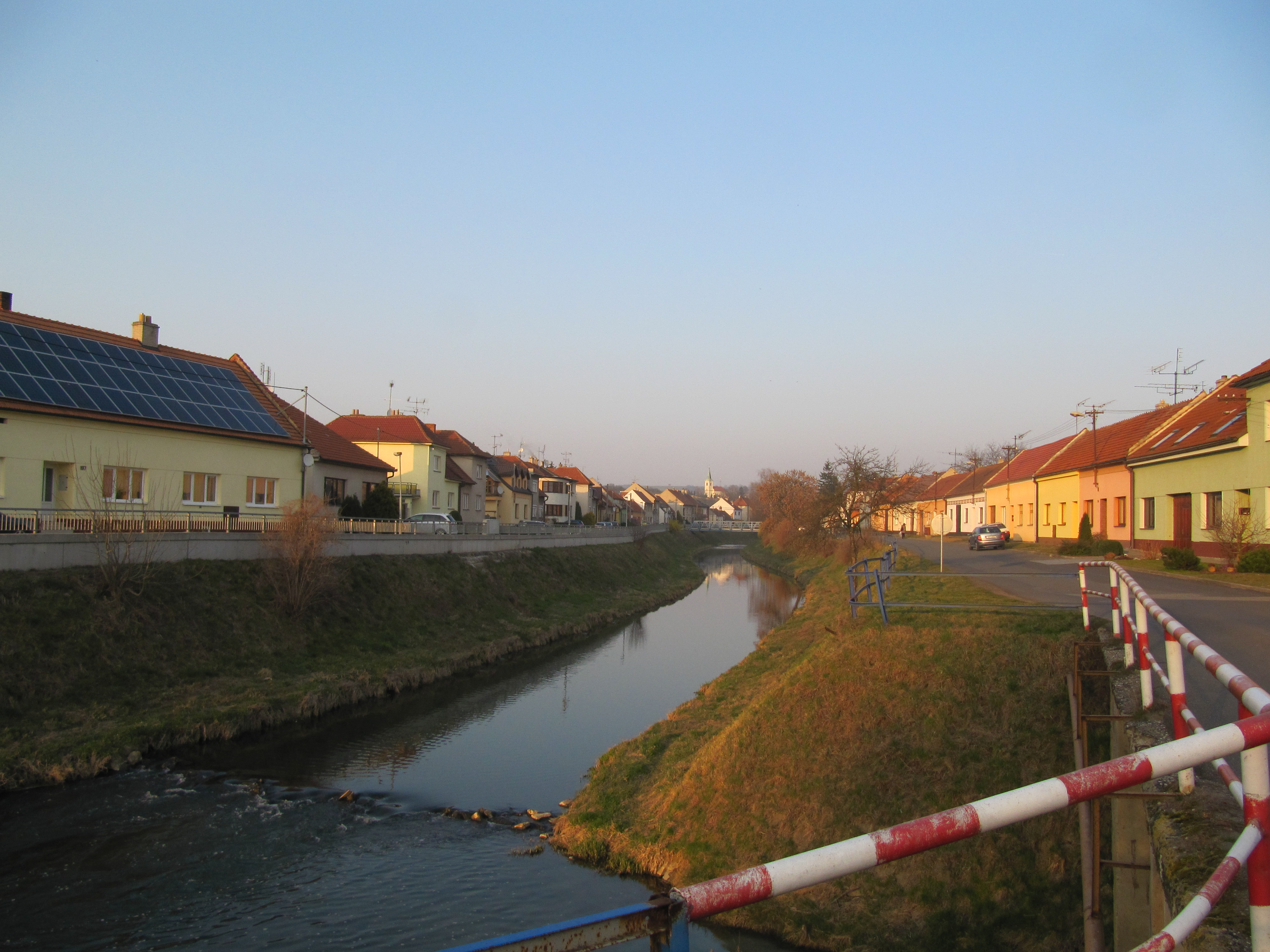
- The Olšava in Kunovice

Location
- Country: Czech Republic
- Region: Zlín

Physical characteristics
- Source
  - location: Šanov, White Carpathians
  - coordinates: 49°1′8″N 17°54′53″E
  - elevation: 622 m (2,041 ft)
- Mouth
  - location: Morava
  - coordinates: 49°2′51″N 17°24′59″E
  - elevation: 177 m (581 ft)
- Length: 44.9 km (27.9 mi)
- Basin size: 520.5 km^{2} (201.0 sq mi)
- Discharge
  - average: 2.14 m^{3}/s (76 cu ft/s) near estuary

Basin features
- Progression: Morava→ Danube→ Black Sea

The Olšava is a river in the Czech Republic, a left tributary of the Morava River. It flows through the Zlín Region. It is 44.9 km (27.9 mi) long.

== Etymology ==
The origin of the name is unclear. If the name is of Slavic origin, it is most likely derived from the Czech word olše (i.e. 'alder'), meaning "river flowing between alders". However, the name may be of pre-Slavic origin. The oldest written document of the river is from 1078, when the name was written as Olsaua.

== Characteristic ==
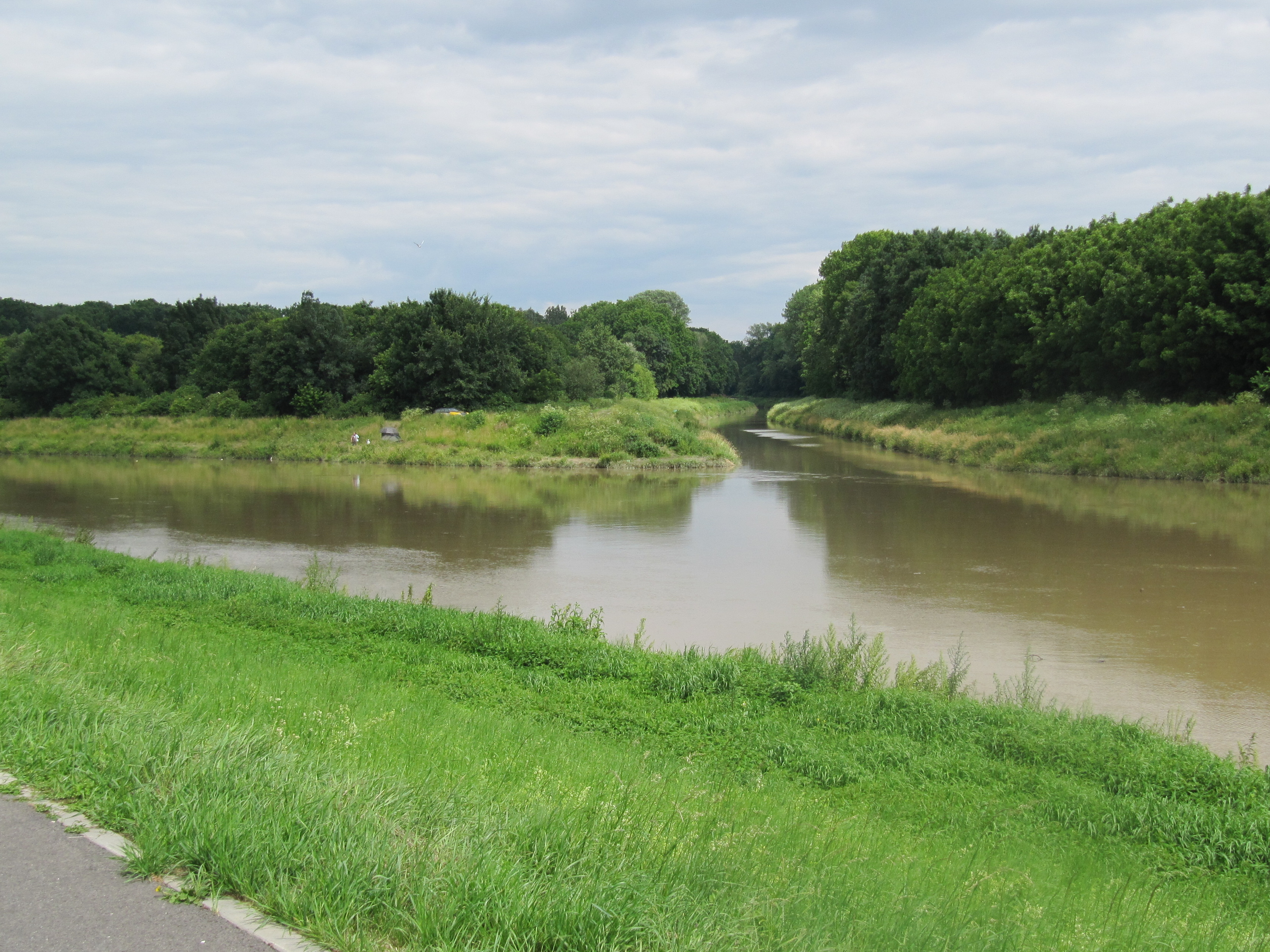
Confluence of the Olšava (right) and Morava

The Olšava originates in the territory of Šanov in the White Carpathians mountain range at an elevation of 622 m (2,041 ft) and flows to Kunovice, where it enters the Morava River at an elevation of 177 m (581 ft). It is 44.9 km (27.9 mi) long. Its drainage basin has an area of 520.5 km^{2} (201.0 sq mi). The average discharge at its mouth is 2.50 m^{3}/s (88 cu ft/s).

The longest tributaries of the Olšava are:

Tributary	Length (km)	Side
Luhačovický potok	26.1	right
Nivnička	20.9	left
Kladenka	14.0	right
Holomňa	11.4	right
Koménka	8.7	left

== Course ==
The river flows through the municipal territories of Šanov, Pitín, Bojkovice, Záhorovice, Nezdenice, Šumice, Uherský Brod, Drslavice, Hradčovice, Veletiny, Popovice, Podolí, Uherské Hradiště and Kunovice.

== Bodies of water ==
There are 123 bodies of water in the basin area. The largest of them is Luhačovice Reservoir with an area of 22.7 ha (56 acres), built on the Luhačovický potok. There are no reservoirs or fishponds built directly on the Olšava.

== Nature ==
The upper course of the river flows through the Bílé Karpaty Protected Landscape Area.

An unregulated section of the river between Podolí and Uherské Hradiště, together with its immediate surroundings, is protected as the Olšava Nature Monument. It is a zoologically significant site with an area of 3.3 ha (8.2 acres). Several species of birds endangered within the Czech Republic live here, such as the common kingfisher, Eurasian penduline tit, marsh warbler and sedge warbler.

== See also ==
- List of rivers of the Czech Republic
