= Šanov (Zlín District) =

- Municipality
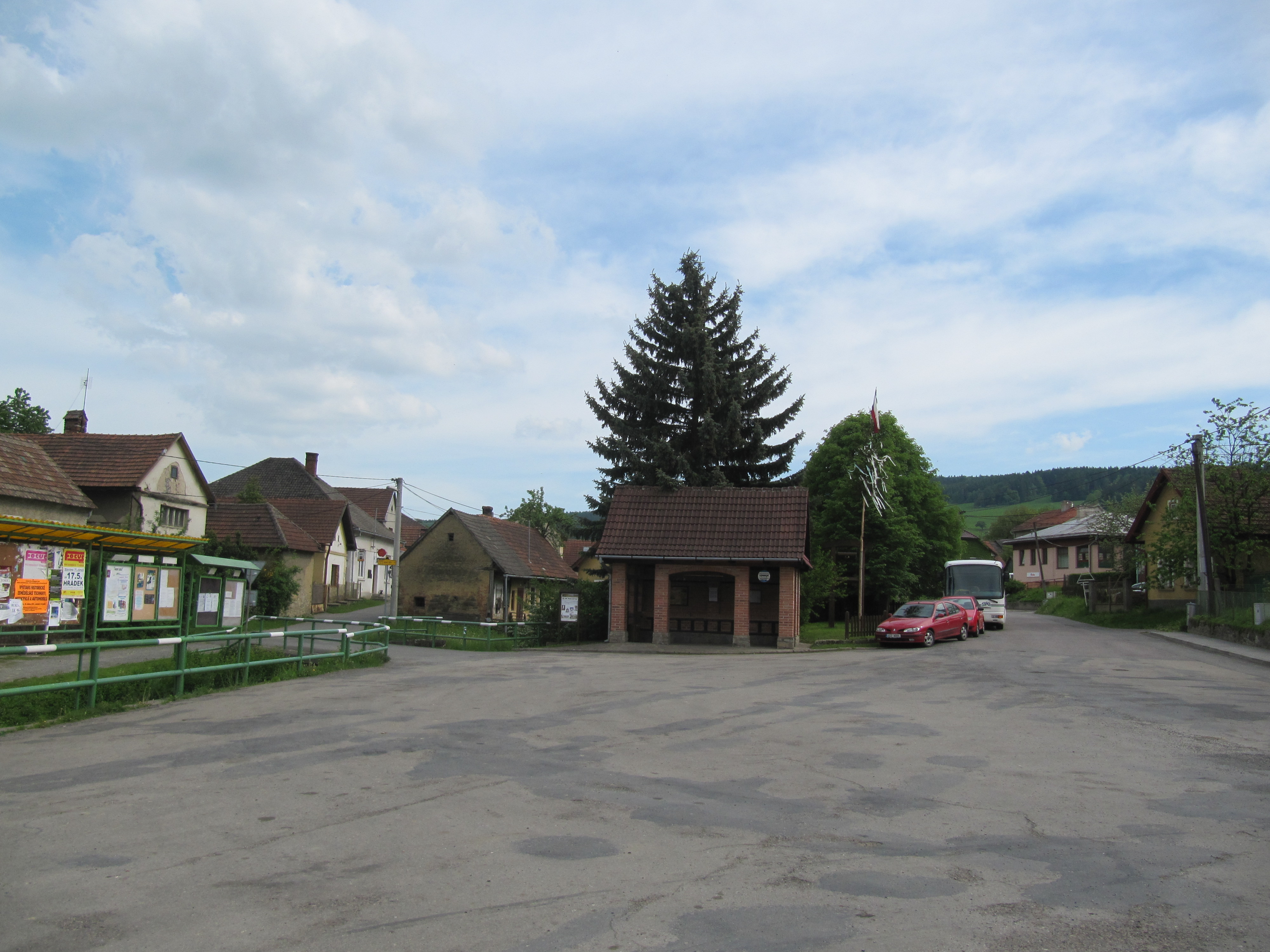
- Centre of Šanov

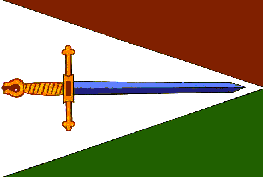
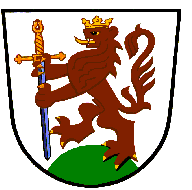
- Flag Coat of arms

- Location in the Czech Republic
- Coordinates: 49°2′44″N 17°53′54″E
- Country: Czech Republic
- Region: Zlín
- District: Zlín
- First mentioned: 1261

Area
  - Total: 9.07 km^{2} (3.50 sq mi)
- Elevation: 415 m (1,362 ft)

Population (2026-01-01)
  - Total: 473
  - Density: 52.1/km^{2} (135/sq mi)
- Time zone: UTC+1 (CET)
  - Summer (DST): UTC+2 (CEST)
- Postal code: 763 21
- Website: www.sanov-obec.cz

Šanov is a municipality and village in Zlín District in the Zlín Region of the Czech Republic. It has about 500 inhabitants.

== Geography ==
Šanov is located 26 kilometres (16 mi) southeast of Zlín, on the border with Slovakia. It lies in the White Carpathians mountain range and in the Bílé Karpaty Protected Landscape Area. The highest point is a nameless hill at 655 m (2,149 ft) above sea level. The Rokytenka Stream originates in the southern part of the municipal territory and then flows through the village. The Olšava River originates near the spring of the Rokytenka, but flows to the west.

== Demographics ==
Historical population
Year	Pop.	±%
1869	455	—
1880	486	+6.8%
1890	526	+8.2%
1900	557	+5.9%
1910	580	+4.1%
1921	551	−5.0%
1930	549	−0.4%
1950	553	+0.7%
1961	630	+13.9%
1970	630	+0.0%
1980	616	−2.2%
1991	555	−9.9%
2001	519	−6.5%
2011	473	−8.9%
2021	436	−7.8%
Source: Censuses
