= Luhačovice =

- Town
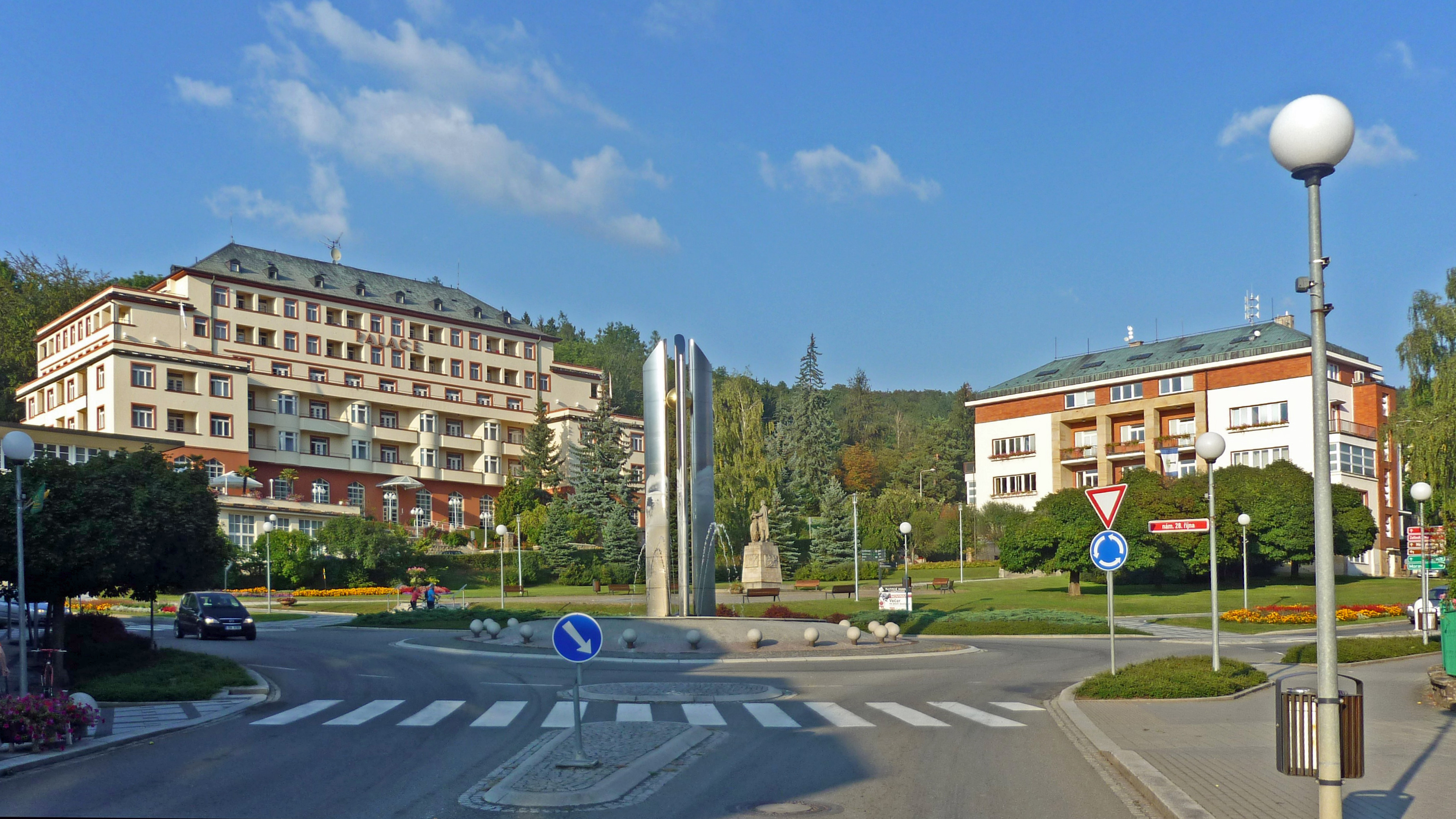
- Centre of Luhačovice

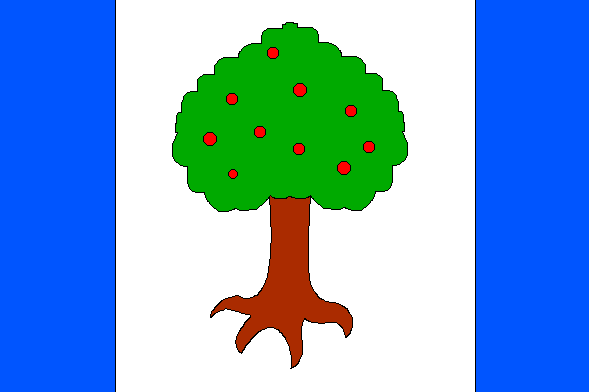
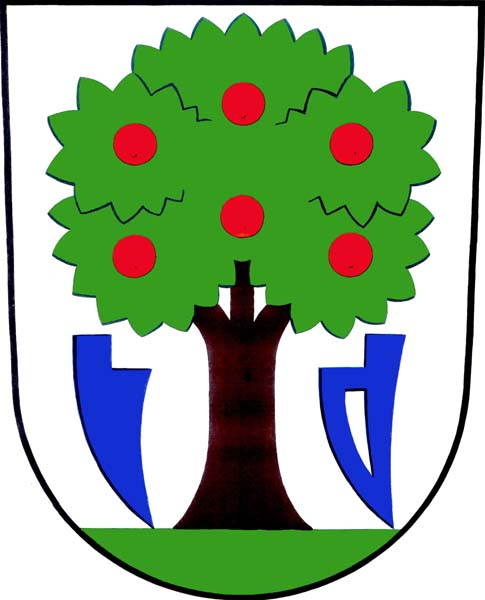
- Flag Coat of arms

- Location in the Czech Republic
- Coordinates: 49°6′3″N 17°45′19″E
- Country: Czech Republic
- Region: Zlín
- District: Zlín
- First mentioned: 1412

Government
  - Mayor: Marian Ležák (Ind.)

Area
  - Total: 33.00 km^{2} (12.74 sq mi)
- Elevation: 253 m (830 ft)

Population (2026-01-01)
  - Total: 4,978
  - Density: 150.8/km^{2} (390.7/sq mi)
- Time zone: UTC+1 (CET)
  - Summer (DST): UTC+2 (CEST)
- Postal code: 763 26
- Website: www.luhacovice.eu

Luhačovice (Czech pronunciation: [ˈluɦatʃovɪtsɛ]; German: Luhatschowitz) is a spa town in Zlín District in the Zlín Region of the Czech Republic. It has about 5,000 inhabitants. The town is located in the valley of the stream Luihačovický potok, in the Vizovice Highlands.

Luhačovice is known for the largest spa in Moravia and for architecturally valuable buildings designed by the architect Dušan Jurkovič. The historic town centre with the spa infrastructure is well preserved and is protected as an urban monument zone.

== Administrative division ==
Luhačovice consists of four municipal parts (in brackets population according to the 2021 census):

- Luhačovice (4,160)
- Kladná Žilín (192)
- Polichno (257)
- Řetechov (233)

Polichno and Řetechov form two exclaves of the municipal territory.

== Etymology ==
The name was probably derived from the personal name Luhač. The name could also be derived from luhy, which means 'meadows on wetter soil'.

== Geography ==
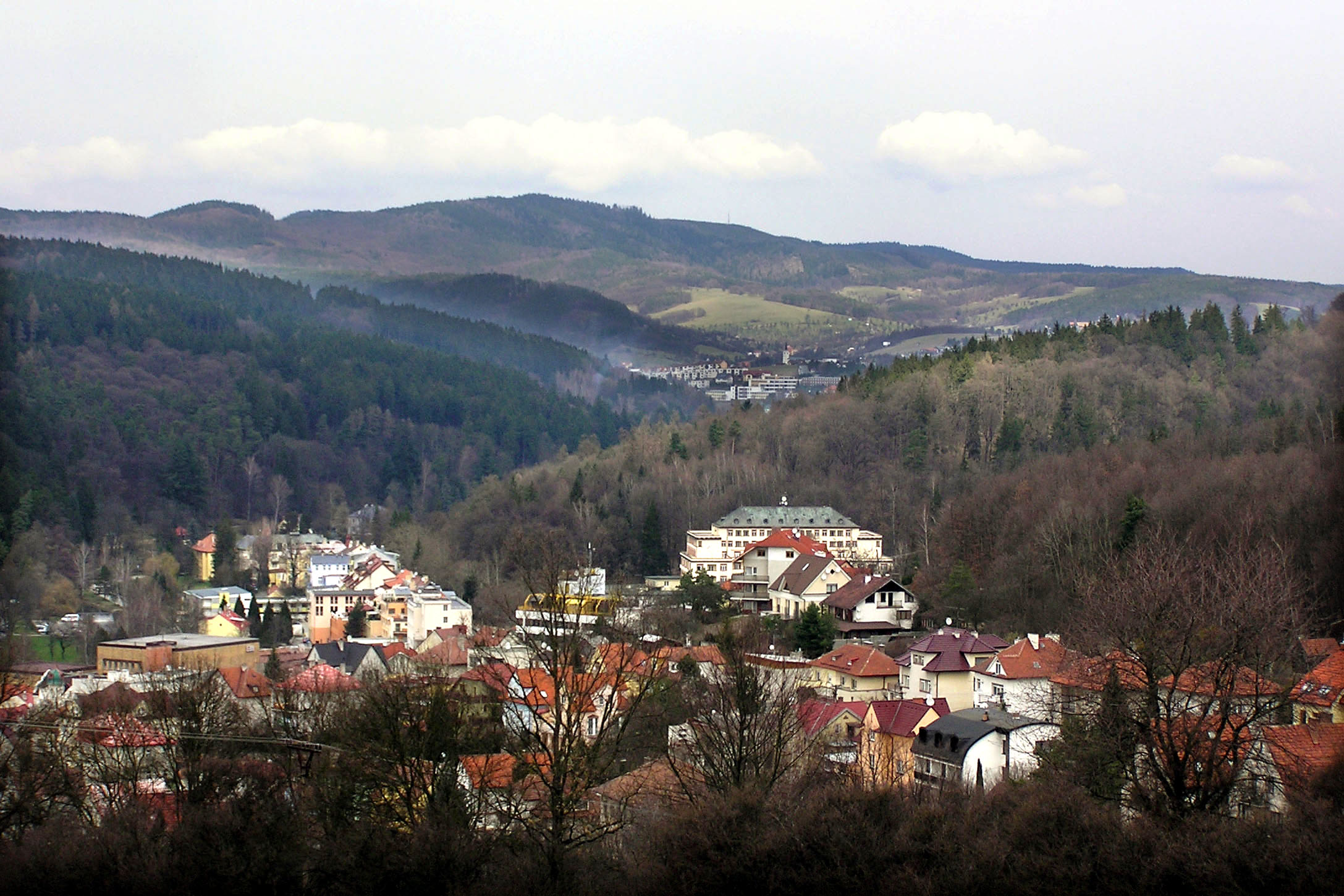
View of the town

Luhačovice is located about 15 kilometres (9 mi) south of Zlín. It lies in a hilly landscape in the Vizovice Highlands. The highest point is the hill Brda at 600 m (2,000 ft) above sea level, located in Řetechov. The town occupies the valley of the stream Luhačovický potok with an elevation of about 250 m above sea level. The eastern part of the municipal territory extends into the White Carpathians Protected Landscape Area.

== History ==
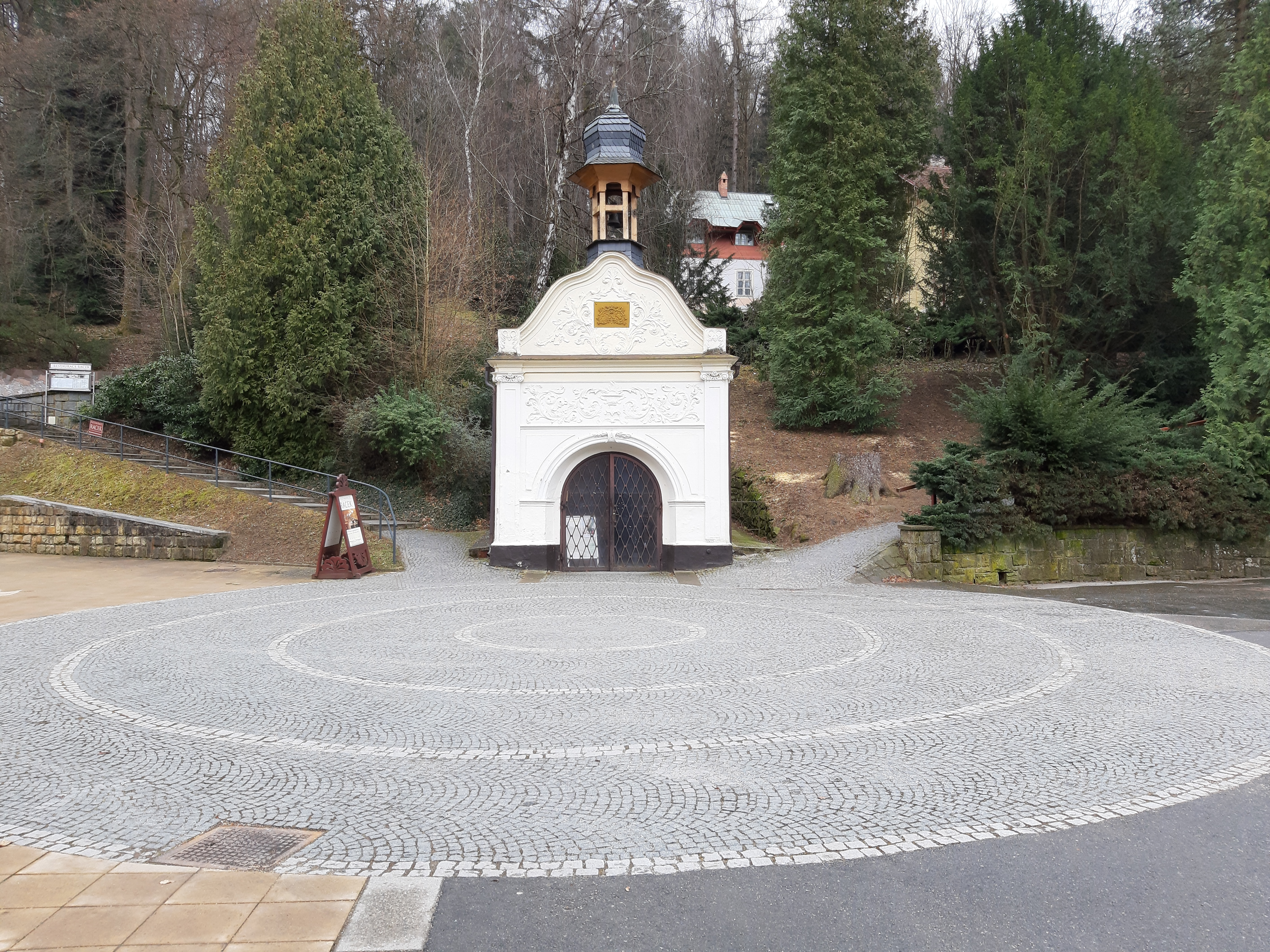
Chapel of Saint Elizabeth

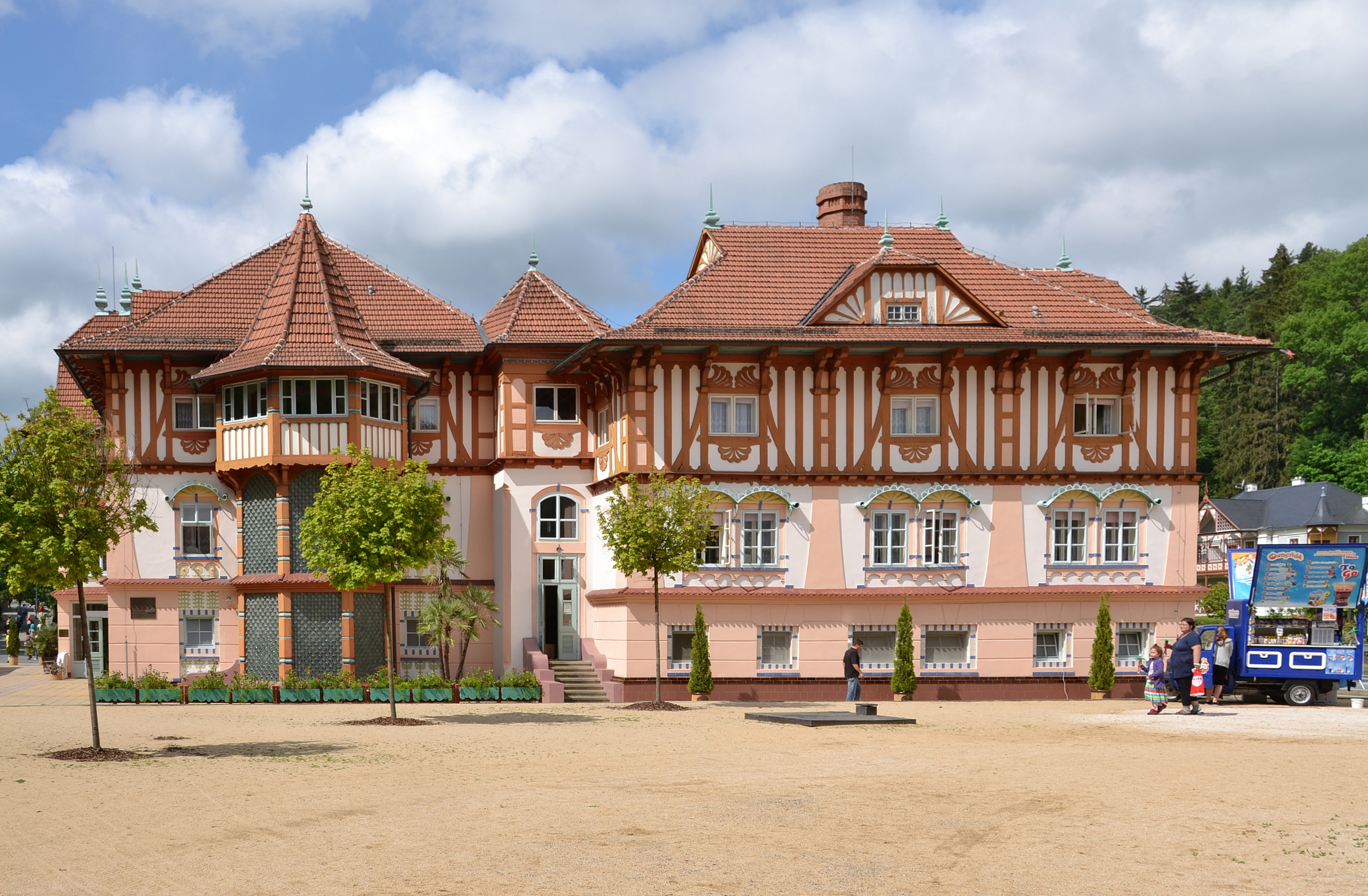
Jurkovič House

=== 15th–18th centuries ===
The first written mention of Luhačovice is from 1412. At the end of the 16th century, Luhačovice became the centre of an estate that included 12 villages. After the Battle of White Mountain, the estate was acquired by Maximilian of Liechtenstein. He sold the estate soon and from 1629 until 1945, the estate belonged to the Serényi family.

The Serényis were the first to make use of the mineral springs in the area and who built the spa. In the second half of the 17th century, Count Ondřej Serényi had adjusted the first spring, later named Amandka after another member of the family, Amand Serényi. Another spring was adjusted in around 1760 and later renamed Vincentka after Vincent Serényi. Reports of the healing power of Luhačovice springs spread, and the first inn for spa guests was built in 1789. In the late 18th century, new houses, inns and Chapel of Saint Elizabeth were built in the vicinity of the springs.

=== 19th–21st centuries ===
In the late 19th century, stagnation and impending bankruptcy affected the spa. In 1902, a Czech medical doctor František Veselý came to Luhačovice and decided to get financial means to change Luhačovice into a modern Czech spa by establishing a joint-stock company, which took over the spa from the control of the Serényis. They, however, kept on taking a significant part in it financially. The railway line was built, which became necessary for the municipality, and Luhačovice gained direct transport connections from Prague, Brno and Olomouc. The first stage of important building development of the spa area was connected with the name of the architect Dušan Jurkovič, the author of the fundamental reconstruction of the Janův House, the hydropathic establishment and other places.

After the stagnation during World War I and setting-up of the independent Czechoslovak Republic, mainly in the 20s and 30s, the importance of the Luhačovice spa increased along with the increasing number of inhabitants. The municipality of Luhačovice was promoted to a town in 1936. Further buildings of architectural importance appeared. After the occupation of Bohemia and Moravia by Nazi Germany, the spa was closed to the Czech public almost completely and was taken possession of by Nazi organisations.

Between 1945 and 1947, a new complex of spa buildings was built: the Great Colonnade and Small Colonnade, the Hall of Vincentka, and the health centre. Social changes after February 1948 influenced both the life of the people in Luhačovice and the spa organisation as a whole, after the entire spa infrastructure was nationalised. In 1957, Luhačovice and other spas were given the spa status, and the spa care was unified in the Ministry of Health. Both the spa care and environment are always in the course of improvement.

In 2017, the Luhačovice Castle and several other properties were given back to Isabella Thienen-Adlerflycht (née Serényi) through restitution.

== Demographics ==
Historical population

Year	Pop.	±%
1869	1,816	—
1880	1,955	+7.7%
1890	2,068	+5.8%
1900	2,267	+9.6%
1910	2,867	+26.5%

Year	Pop.	±%
1921	3,005	+4.8%
1930	3,362	+11.9%
1950	3,737	+11.2%
1961	4,733	+26.7%
1970	5,062	+7.0%

Year	Pop.	±%
1980	5,378	+6.2%
1991	5,828	+8.4%
2001	5,621	−3.6%
2011	5,172	−8.0%
2021	4,842	−6.4%

Source: Censuses

== Transport ==
Luhačovice is connected with Prague by a direct interregional railway line. In addition, there is the line to Bojkovice.

== Mineral water ==
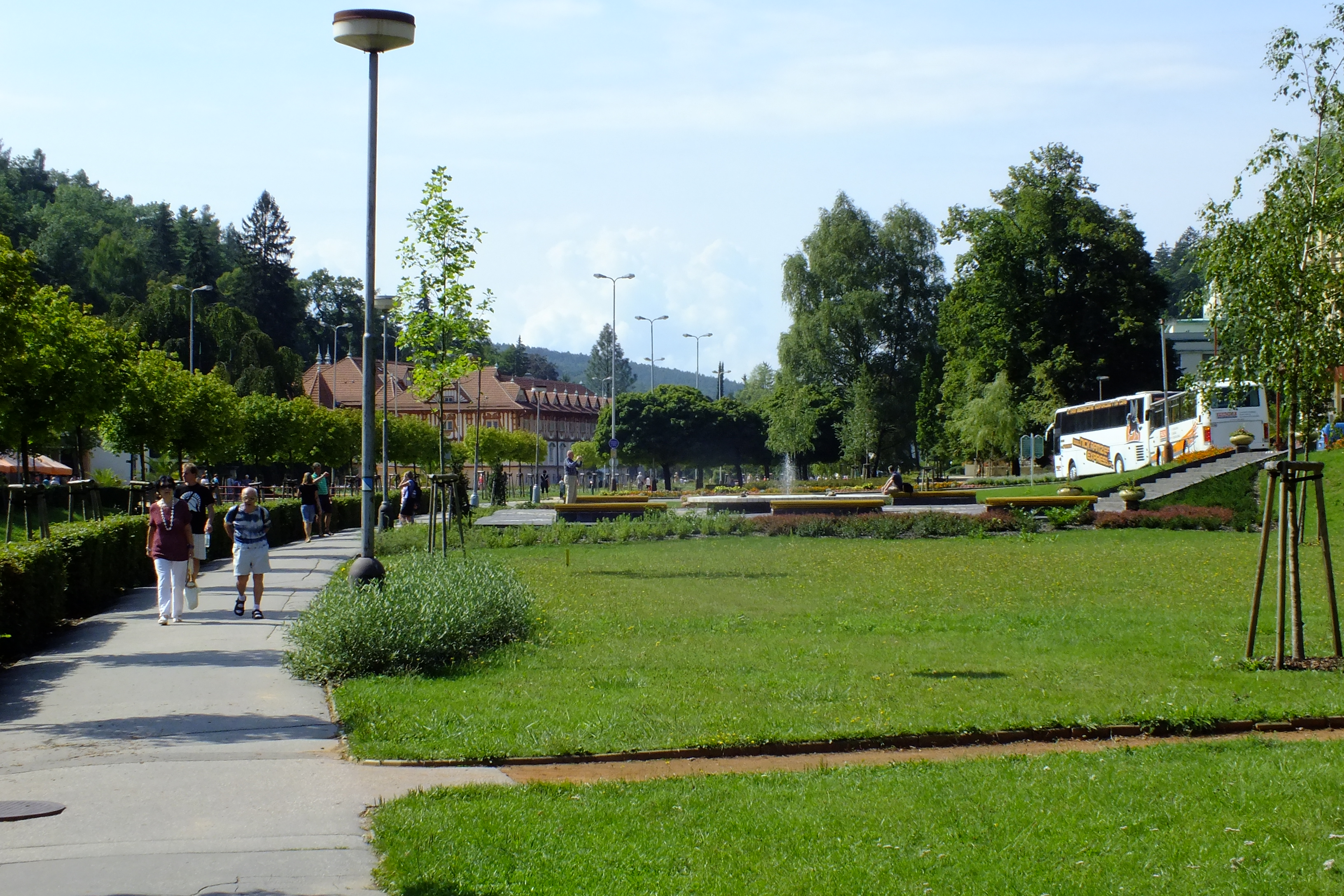
Spa park

Luhačovice mineral water is a heavily mineralised, naturally effervescent residual seawater, indicated for diseases of vocal cords and breathing pathways, metabolic diseases, stomach and duodenal ulcers, liver cirrhosis, diabetes mellitus, chronic pancreatitis, and excessive consumption of alcohol. The water is bottled under the brand name Vincentka.

== Sights ==
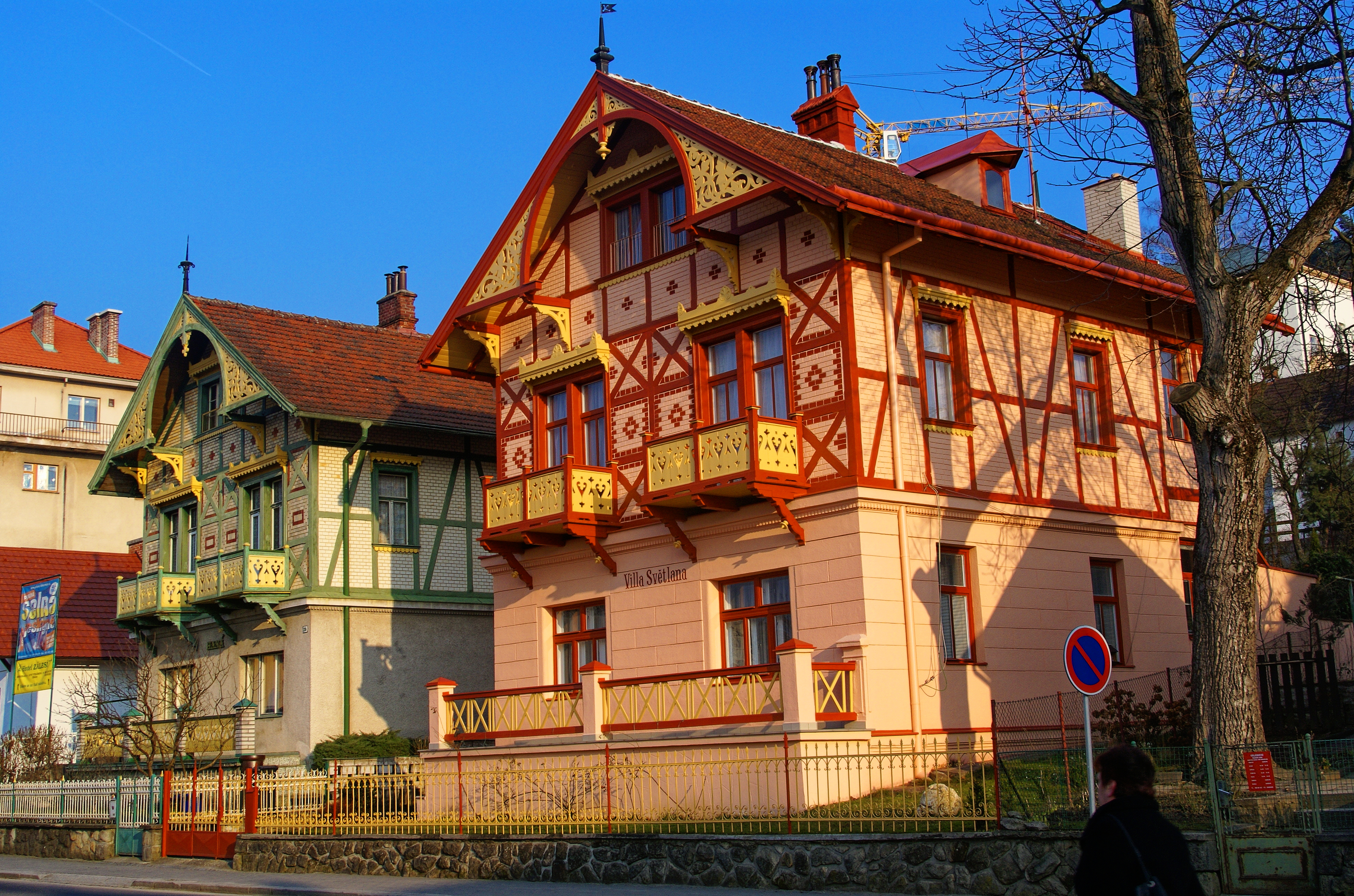
Swiss Style Art Nouveau Haná and Světlana villas from 1895 and 1897

The small Chapel of Saint Elizabeth from 1795 is the oldest preserved building in Luhačovice. From the 1880s, many villas were built in the town, mostly in the Swiss Style Art Nouveau and Neo-Renaissance styles.

In 1902–1914, the architect Dušan Jurkovič created here a unique set of buildings in the style of folk Art Nouveau inspired by local natural environment. The appearance of his buildings influenced the entire urbanism of Luhačovice. The Jurkovič House from 1902 was his first building which belongs to the most famous and valuable objects in the spa. The hotel is decorated by fresco of Saints Cyril and Methodius by Jano Köhler. Other Jurkovič's folk Art Nouveau buildings include Chaloupka and Jestřabí hotels, a hydrotherapy institute with the Sunshine Spa swimming pool, Vlastimila and Valaška villas, a bandstand, and several building that have not been preserved.

In the 1920s and 1930s, spa houses and pavilions, the town hall, a new swimming pool and a community house were built with the contribution of architects such as Bohuslav Fuchs, J. L. Holzl and the Kuba brothers, and completed the unique appearance of the town.

== Notable people ==
- Tomáš Eduard Šilinger (1866–1913), politician and journalist; died here
- Josef Šnajdr (1909–1992), military commander and pilot
- Bronislav Červenka (born 1975), football player and manager
- Jan Jelínek (born 1982), football player and manager

== Twin towns – sister cities ==
Luhačovice is twinned with:

- Piešťany, Slovakia
- Topoľčany, Slovakia
- Ustroń, Poland
