= Krhov (Blansko District) =

- Municipality
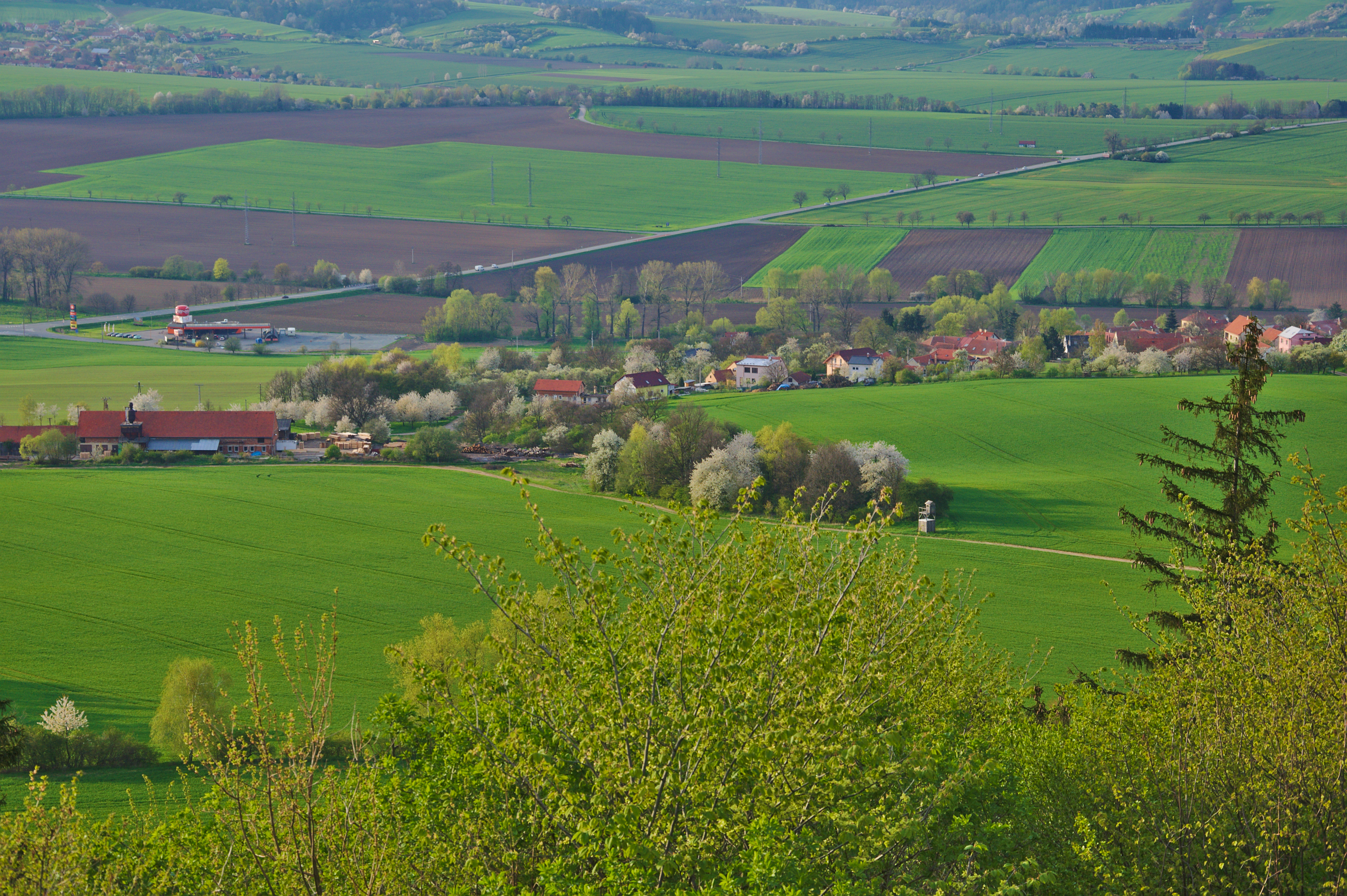
- View from the south

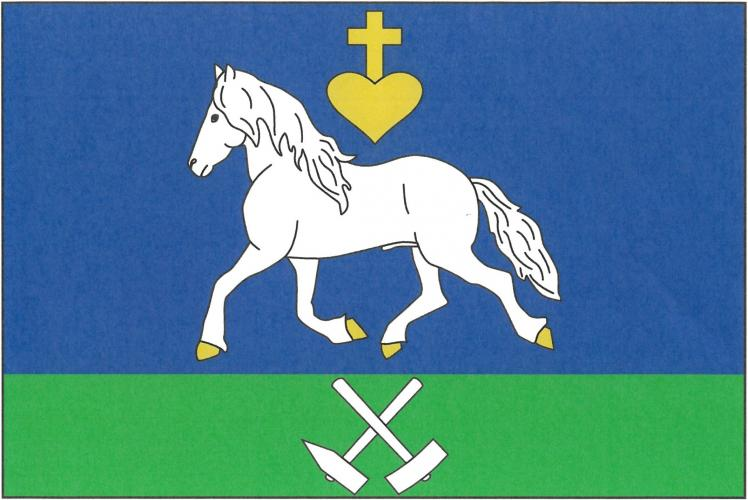
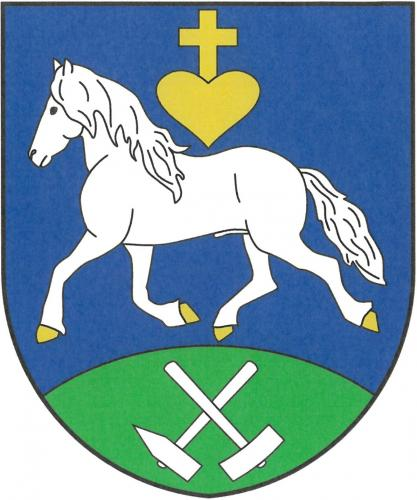
- Flag Coat of arms

- Location in the Czech Republic
- Coordinates: 49°27′37″N 16°35′2″E
- Country: Czech Republic
- Region: South Moravian
- District: Blansko
- First mentioned: 1409

Area
  - Total: 1.94 km^{2} (0.75 sq mi)
- Elevation: 353 m (1,158 ft)

Population (2026-01-01)
  - Total: 168
  - Density: 86.6/km^{2} (224/sq mi)
- Time zone: UTC+1 (CET)
  - Summer (DST): UTC+2 (CEST)
- Postal code: 679 01
- Website: www.krhov.eu

Krhov is a municipality and village in Blansko District in the South Moravian Region of the Czech Republic. It has about 200 inhabitants.

Krhov lies approximately 11 kilometres (7 mi) north-west of Blansko, 29 km (18 mi) north of Brno, and 171 km (106 mi) south-east of Prague.

== Demographics ==
Historical population
Year	Pop.	±%
1869	170	—
1880	177	+4.1%
1890	163	−7.9%
1900	170	+4.3%
1910	152	−10.6%
1921	171	+12.5%
1930	193	+12.9%
1950	184	−4.7%
1961	196	+6.5%
1970	198	+1.0%
1980	162	−18.2%
1991	167	+3.1%
2001	159	−4.8%
2011	153	−3.8%
2021	143	−6.5%
Source: Censuses
