= Krhov (Třebíč District) =

- Municipality
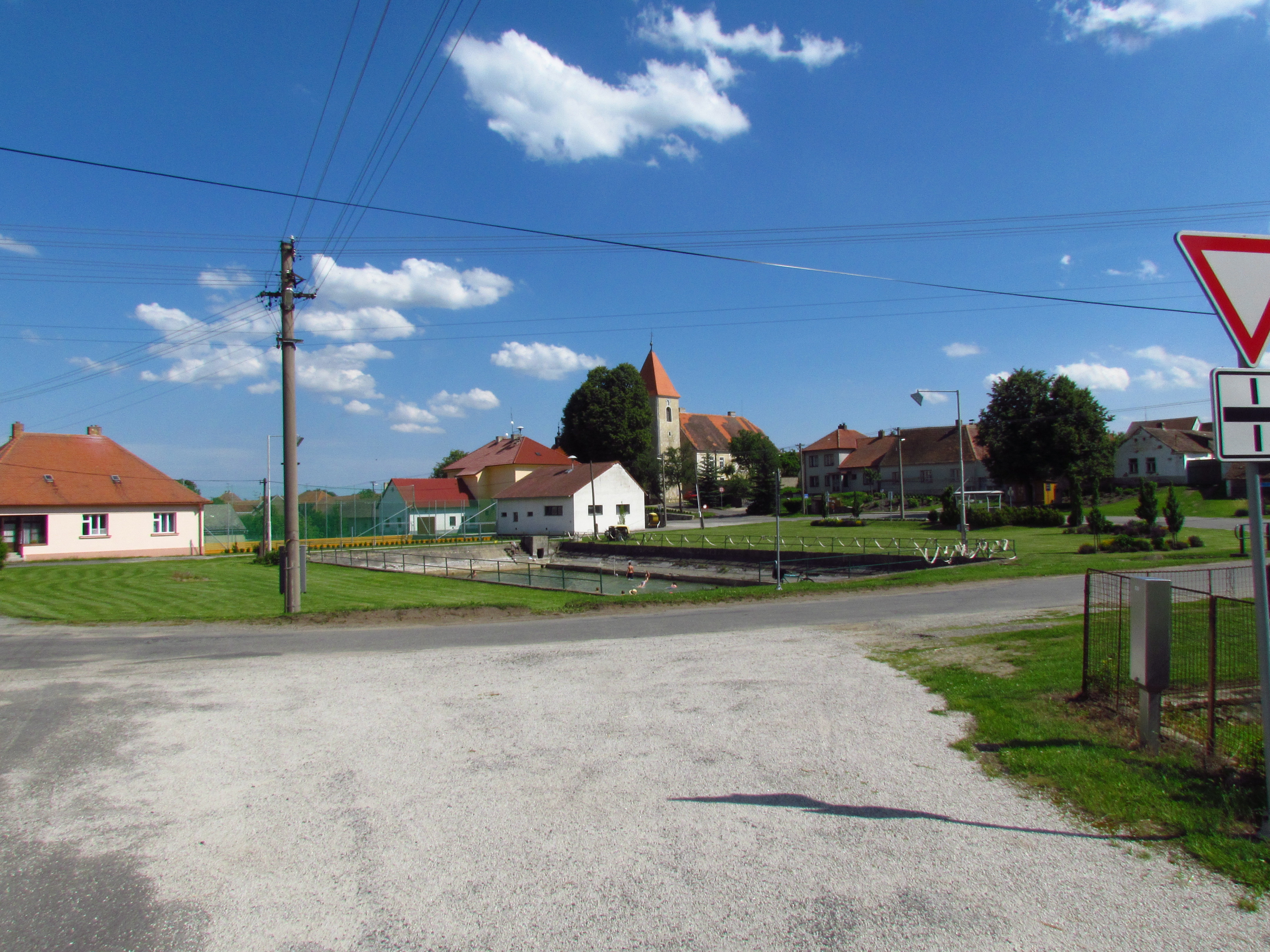
- Centre of Krhov

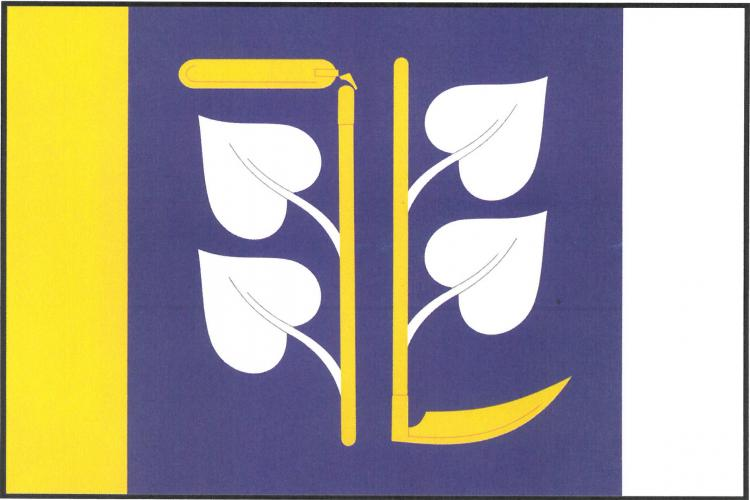
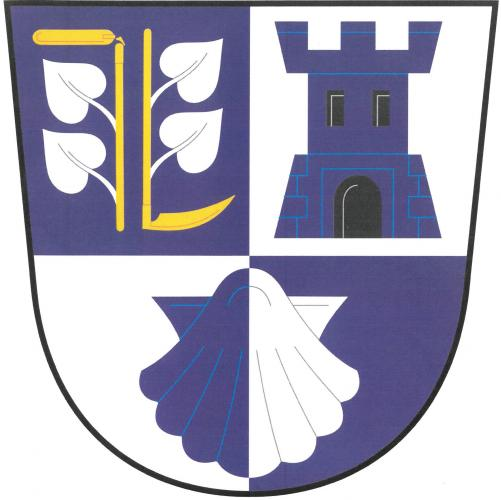
- Flag Coat of arms

- Location in the Czech Republic
- Coordinates: 49°6′1″N 16°1′10″E
- Country: Czech Republic
- Region: Vysočina
- District: Třebíč
- First mentioned: 1253

Area
  - Total: 6.60 km^{2} (2.55 sq mi)
- Elevation: 435 m (1,427 ft)

Population (2026-01-01)
  - Total: 180
  - Density: 27/km^{2} (71/sq mi)
- Time zone: UTC+1 (CET)
  - Summer (DST): UTC+2 (CEST)
- Postal code: 675 55
- Website: www.obeckrhov.cz

Krhov is a municipality and village in Třebíč District in the Vysočina Region of the Czech Republic. It has about 200 inhabitants.

Krhov lies approximately 18 kilometres (11 mi) south-east of Třebíč, 46 km (29 mi) south-east of Jihlava, and 160 km (99 mi) south-east of Prague.

== Demographics ==
Historical population
Year	Pop.	±%
1869	378	—
1880	382	+1.1%
1890	375	−1.8%
1900	401	+6.9%
1910	430	+7.2%
1921	458	+6.5%
1930	435	−5.0%
1950	341	−21.6%
1961	346	+1.5%
1970	332	−4.0%
1980	293	−11.7%
1991	244	−16.7%
2001	218	−10.7%
2011	195	−10.6%
2021	167	−14.4%
Source: Censuses
