= Starý Hrozenkov =

- Municipality
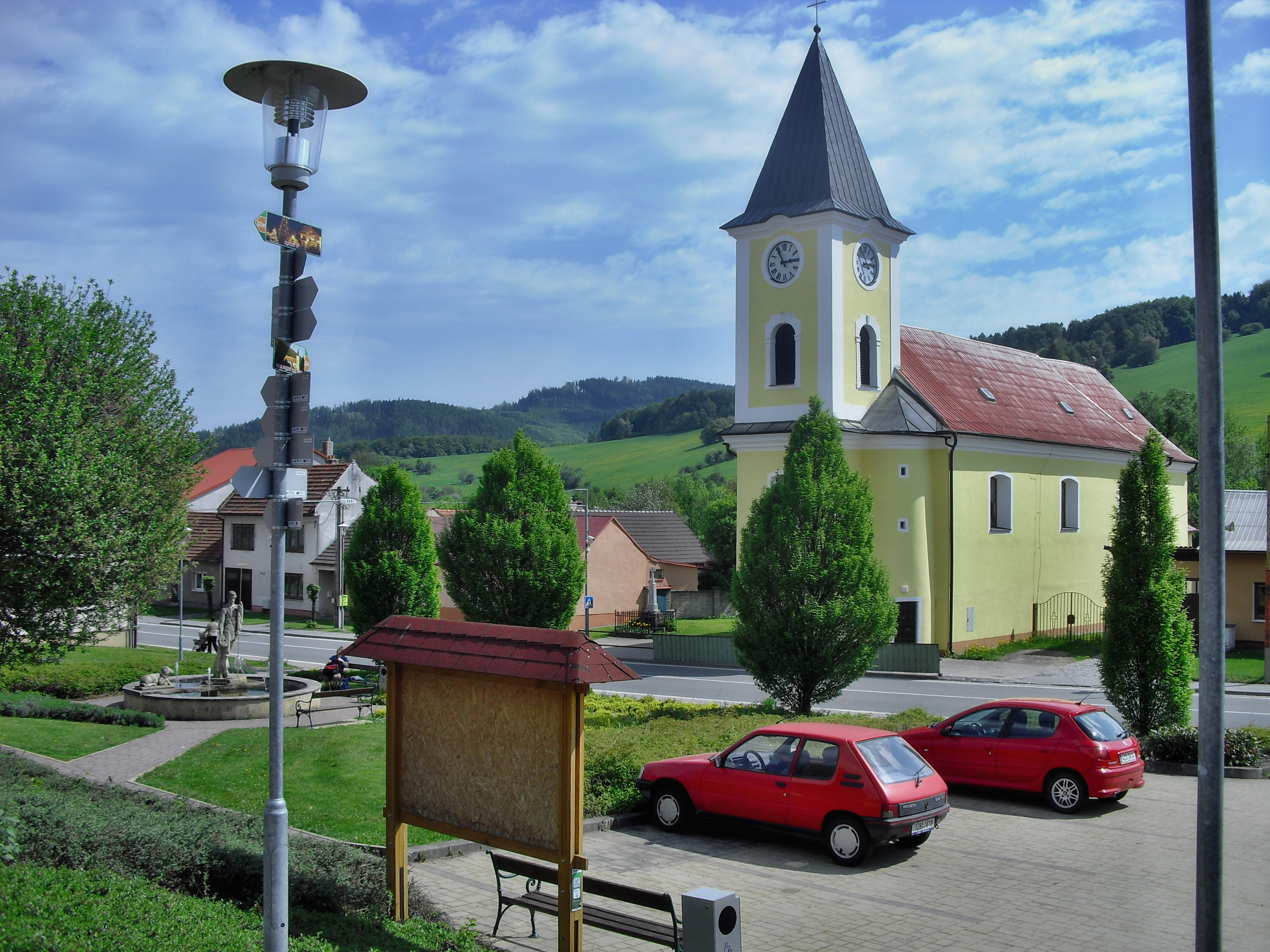
- Square with the Church of the Nativity of the Virgin Mary

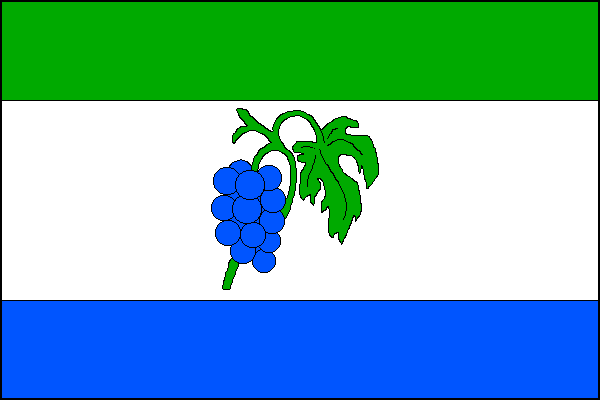
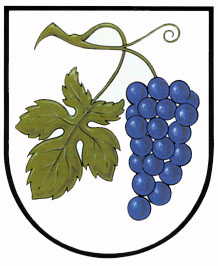
- Flag Coat of arms

- Location in the Czech Republic
- Coordinates: 48°57′57″N 17°51′47″E
- Country: Czech Republic
- Region: Zlín
- District: Uherské Hradiště
- First mentioned: 1261

Area
  - Total: 10.84 km^{2} (4.19 sq mi)
- Elevation: 378 m (1,240 ft)

Population (2026-01-01)
  - Total: 774
  - Density: 71.4/km^{2} (185/sq mi)
- Time zone: UTC+1 (CET)
  - Summer (DST): UTC+2 (CEST)
- Postal code: 687 74
- Website: www.staryhrozenkov.cz

Starý Hrozenkov is a municipality and village in Uherské Hradiště District in the Zlín Region of the Czech Republic. It has about 800 inhabitants.

Starý Hrozenkov lies approximately 33 kilometres (21 mi) east of Uherské Hradiště, 34 km (21 mi) south-east of Zlín, and 279 km (173 mi) south-east of Prague.

== Demographics ==
Historical population
Year	Pop.	±%
1869	758	—
1880	742	−2.1%
1890	813	+9.6%
1900	881	+8.4%
1910	907	+3.0%
1921	930	+2.5%
1930	875	−5.9%
1950	913	+4.3%
1961	1,035	+13.4%
1970	941	−9.1%
1980	979	+4.0%
1991	812	−17.1%
2001	859	+5.8%
2011	914	+6.4%
2021	764	−16.4%
Source: Censuses

== Twin towns – sister cities ==
Starý Hrozenkov is twinned with:

- Darłowo, Poland
