= Bojkovice =

- Town
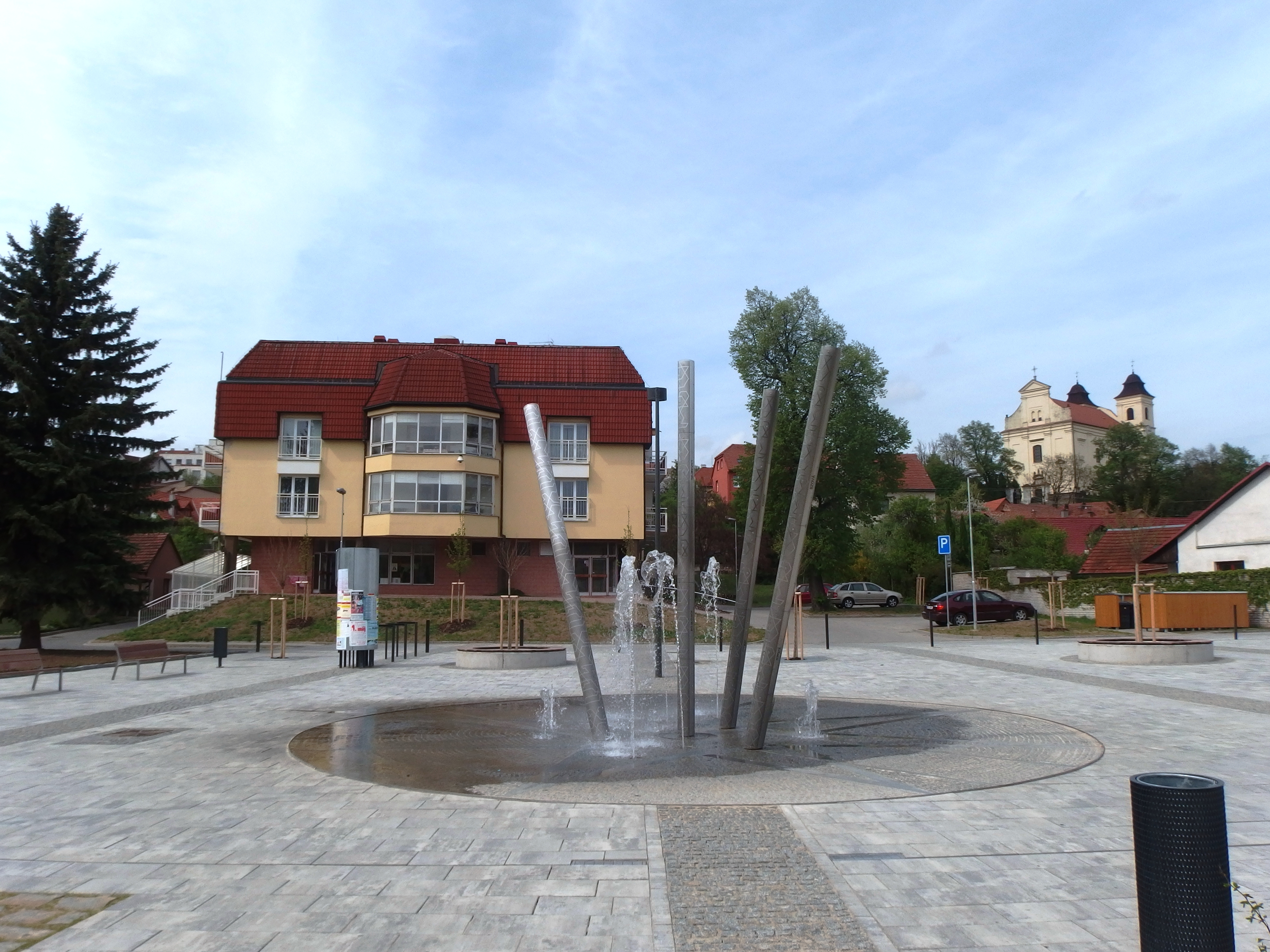
- Centre of Bojkovice

- Flag Coat of arms

- Location in the Czech Republic
- Coordinates: 49°2′19″N 17°48′54″E
- Country: Czech Republic
- Region: Zlín
- District: Uherské Hradiště
- First mentioned: 1362

Government
  - Mayor: Petr Viceník

Area
  - Total: 41.87 km^{2} (16.17 sq mi)
- Elevation: 272 m (892 ft)

Population (2026-01-01)
  - Total: 4,395
  - Density: 105.0/km^{2} (271.9/sq mi)
- Time zone: UTC+1 (CET)
  - Summer (DST): UTC+2 (CEST)
- Postal code: 687 71
- Website: www.bojkovice.cz

Bojkovice (Czech pronunciation: [ˈbojkovɪtsɛ]) is a town in Uherské Hradiště District in the Zlín Region of the Czech Republic. It has about 4,400 inhabitants. The town is located on the Olšava River, on the border between the Vizovice Highlands and the White Carpathians mountain range.

Bojkovice was founded in the 14th century at the latest, but it became a town only in 1965. The main landmark of the town is the Nový Světlov Castle.

== Administrative division ==
Bojkovice consists of four municipal parts (in brackets population according to the 2021 census):

- Bojkovice (3,575)
- Bzová (305)
- Krhov (223)
- Přečkovice (148)

== Geography ==
Bojkovice is located about 23 kilometres (14 mi) south of Zlín and 21 km (13 mi) northwest of Trenčín. The northern part of the municipal territory lies in the Vizovice Highlands and the southern part lies in the White Carpathians mountain range. The highest point is the hill Lokov at 739 m (2,425 ft) above sea level. The upper course of the Olšava River flows through the town. The built-up area lies in the valley of this river. The almost entire territory of Bojkovice lies within the Bílé Karpaty Protected Landscape Area.

== History ==
The first written mention of Bojkovice is from 1362. It was promoted to a market town in 1449. In the 16th century, Bojkovice was attacked and plundered by the Hungarians, bringing periods of famine.

In the second half of the 19th century, Bojkovice was industrialised, but the municipality retained its agricultural character. Economic growth was slowed by World War II, during which all local mills and distilleries disappeared. Bojkovice received the town status in 1965.

== Demographics ==
Historical population

Year	Pop.	±%
1869	3,454	—
1880	3,556	+3.0%
1890	3,536	−0.6%
1900	3,670	+3.8%
1910	3,821	+4.1%

Year	Pop.	±%
1921	3,859	+1.0%
1930	3,983	+3.2%
1950	4,021	+1.0%
1961	4,532	+12.7%
1970	4,429	−2.3%

Year	Pop.	±%
1980	4,629	+4.5%
1991	4,858	+4.9%
2001	4,768	−1.9%
2011	4,396	−7.8%
2021	4,251	−3.3%

Source: Censuses

== Transport ==
Bojkovice is located on the railway line Staré Město–Bylnice.

== Culture ==
Bojkovice lies in the ethnographic region of Moravian Slovakia.

== Sights ==
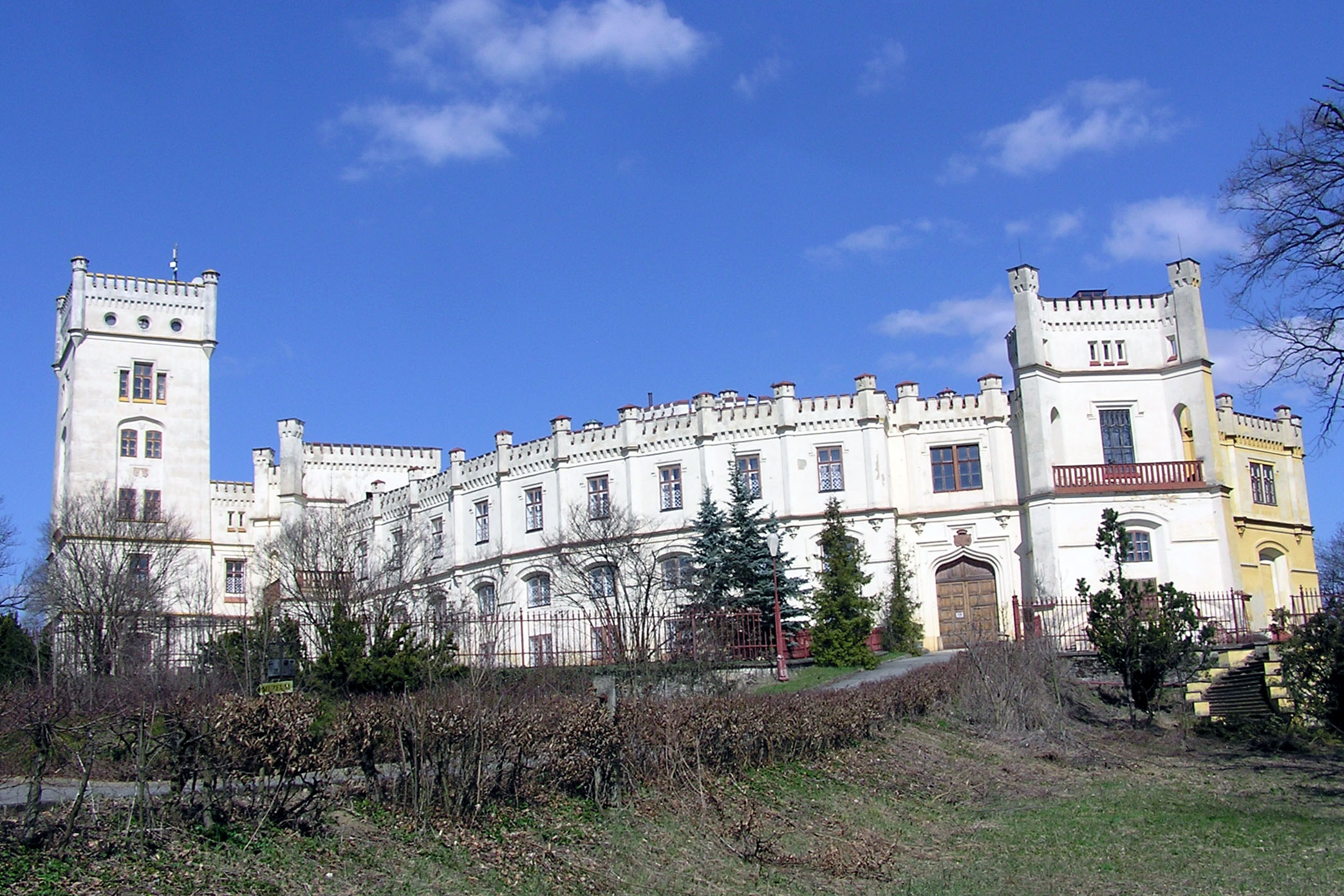
Nový Světlov Castle

The most important landmark is the Nový Světlov Castle. It was originally a fortress, built in the 1480s to protect the town from the attacks of Hungarians. In the second half of the 19th century, it was converted into a castle in the Tudor neo-Gothic style.

The Church of Saint Lawrence is an early Baroque building from the 17th century.

In the town is the Bojkov Region Museum, focused on local folklore and traditions.

== Notable people ==
- Karel Urbánek (born 1941), politician

== Twin towns – sister cities ==
Bojkovice is twinned with:

- Trenčianska Turná, Slovakia
