= Vizovice Highlands =

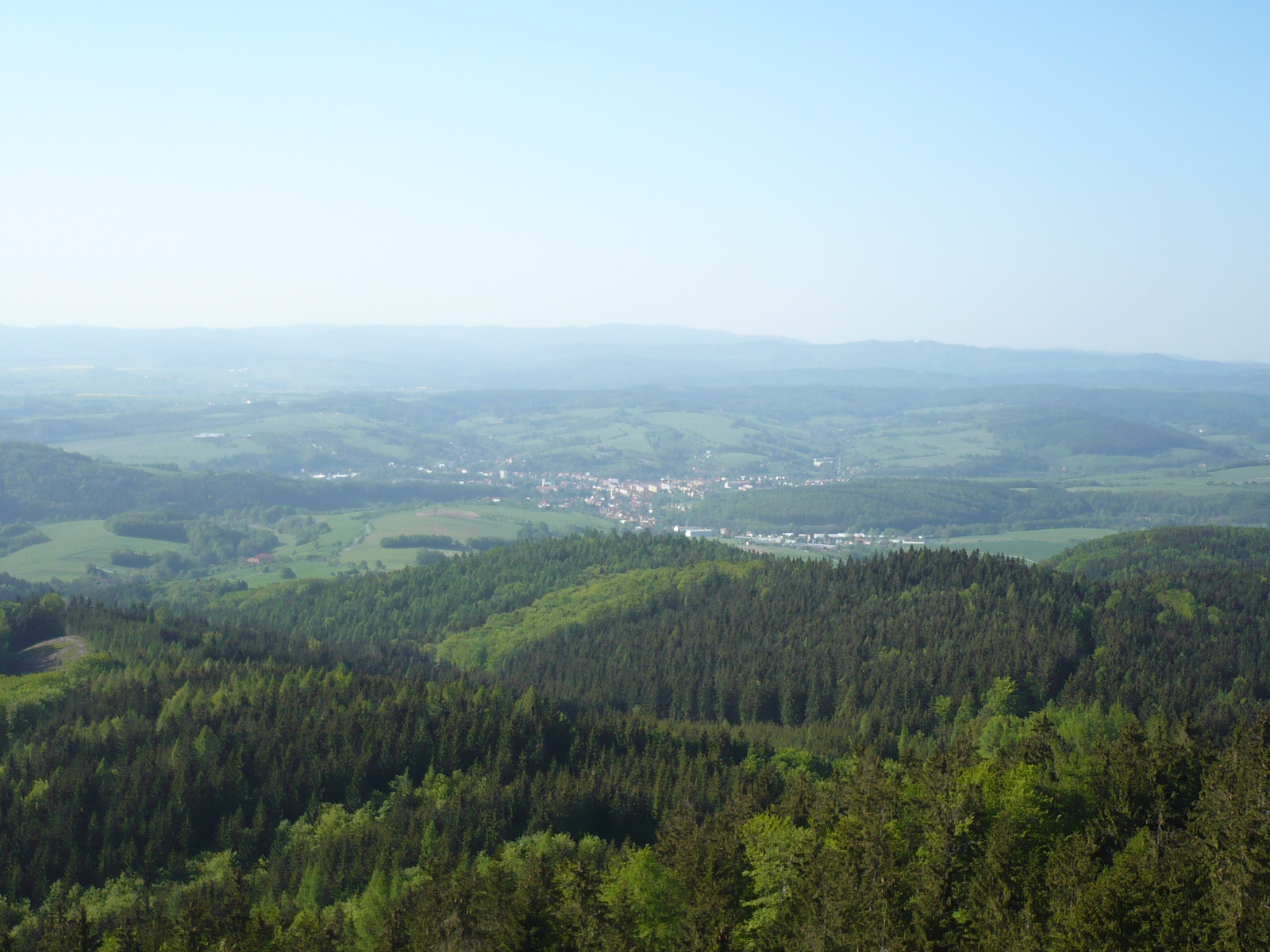
- View from Doubrava

Highest point
- Peak: Klášťov
- Elevation: 753 m (2,470 ft)

Dimensions
- Length: 68 km (42 mi)
- Area: 1,399 km^{2} (540 mi^{2})

Geography
- Vizovice Highlands in the Outer Western Carpathians, marked in red
- Country: Czech Republic
- Regions: Zlín, South Moravian
- Range coordinates: 49°8′N 17°44′E
- Parent range: Slovak-Moravian Carpathians

Geology
- Rock type(s): Flysch, claystone

The Vizovice Highlands (Czech: Vizovická vrchovina) are highlands and a geomorphological mesoregion of the Czech Republic. It is located in the Zlín and South Moravian regions. It is named after the town of Vizovice.

== Geomorphology ==
The Vizovice Highlands are a mesoregion of the Slovak-Moravian Carpathians within the Outer Western Carpathians. The highlands are further subdivided into the microregions of Fryšták Furrow, Zlín Highlands, Komonec Mountains, Luhačovice Highlands and Hluk Uplands.

There are a lot of medium-high hills. The highest peaks are located in the ridge of Komonec Mountains in the northeastern part of the territory. The highest peaks of the Vizovice Highlands are:

- Klášťov, 753 m (2,470 ft)
- Svéradov, 737 m (2,418 ft)
- Krajčice, 730 m (2,400 ft)
- Javorník, 720 m (2,360 ft)
- Láz, 707 m (2,320 ft)
- Rovně, 702 m (2,303 ft)
- Kopce, 699 m (2,293 ft)
- Suchý vrch, 693 m (2,274 ft)
- Na Kopci, 683 m (2,241 ft)
- Doubrava, 667 m (2,188 ft)

== Geography ==
The territory has a relatively regular shape and stretches from southwest to northeast. The region has an area of 1,399 square kilometres (540 sq mi) and an average elevation of 339 m (1,112 ft). It is almost 70 km (43 mi) long and almost 40 km (25 mi) wide in its widest part.

The area is rich in streams, but there are no significant rivers. The most important rivers are the Dřevnice in the north, the Olšava in the centre and the Velička in the south. They all flow from east to west and are the tributaries of the Morava, which flows along the western border of the territory, just outside of it.

The most populated settlements located in whole or in large part in the territory are the city of Zlín and the towns of Uherský Brod, Veselí nad Moravou, Napajedla, Slavičín, Luhačovice, Vizovice, Bojkovice, Fryšták and Slušovice. The towns of Uherské Hradiště and Otrokovice also significantly extends into the Vizovice Highlands.

== Protection of nature ==
The protected landscape area of Bílé Karpaty extends into the Vizovice Highlands in the east.

== Gallery ==
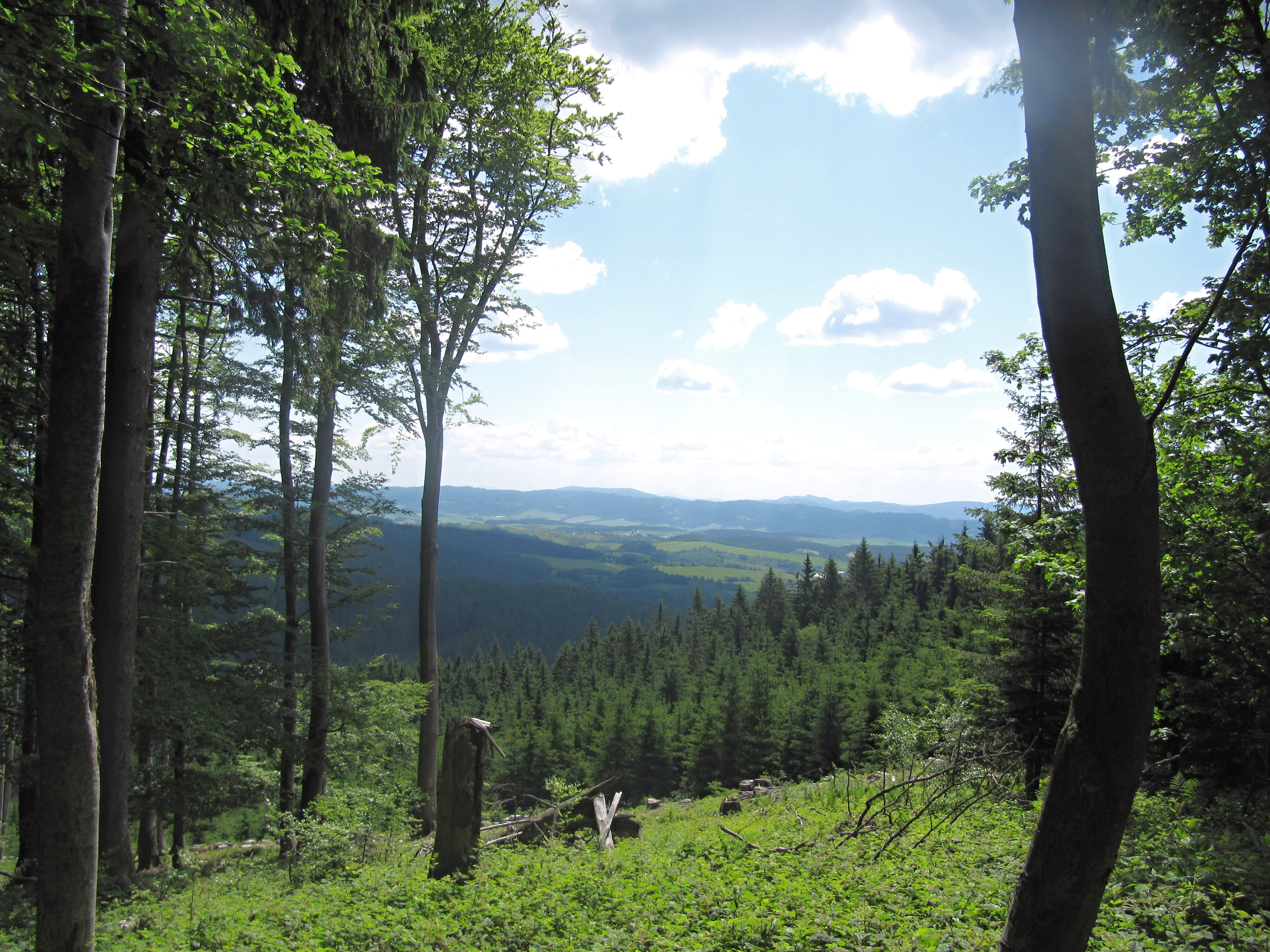
View from Klášťov

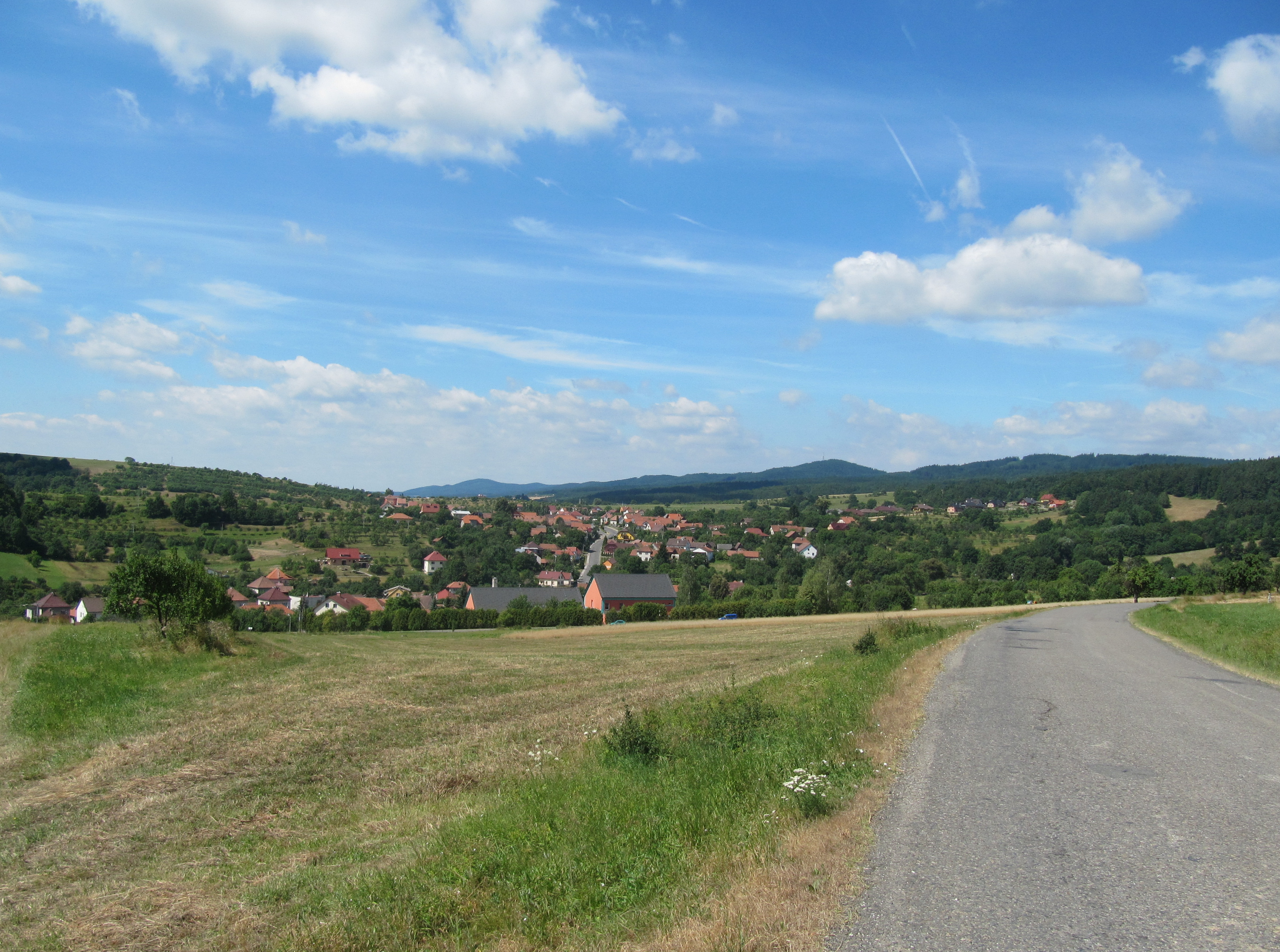
View towards Vysoké Pole

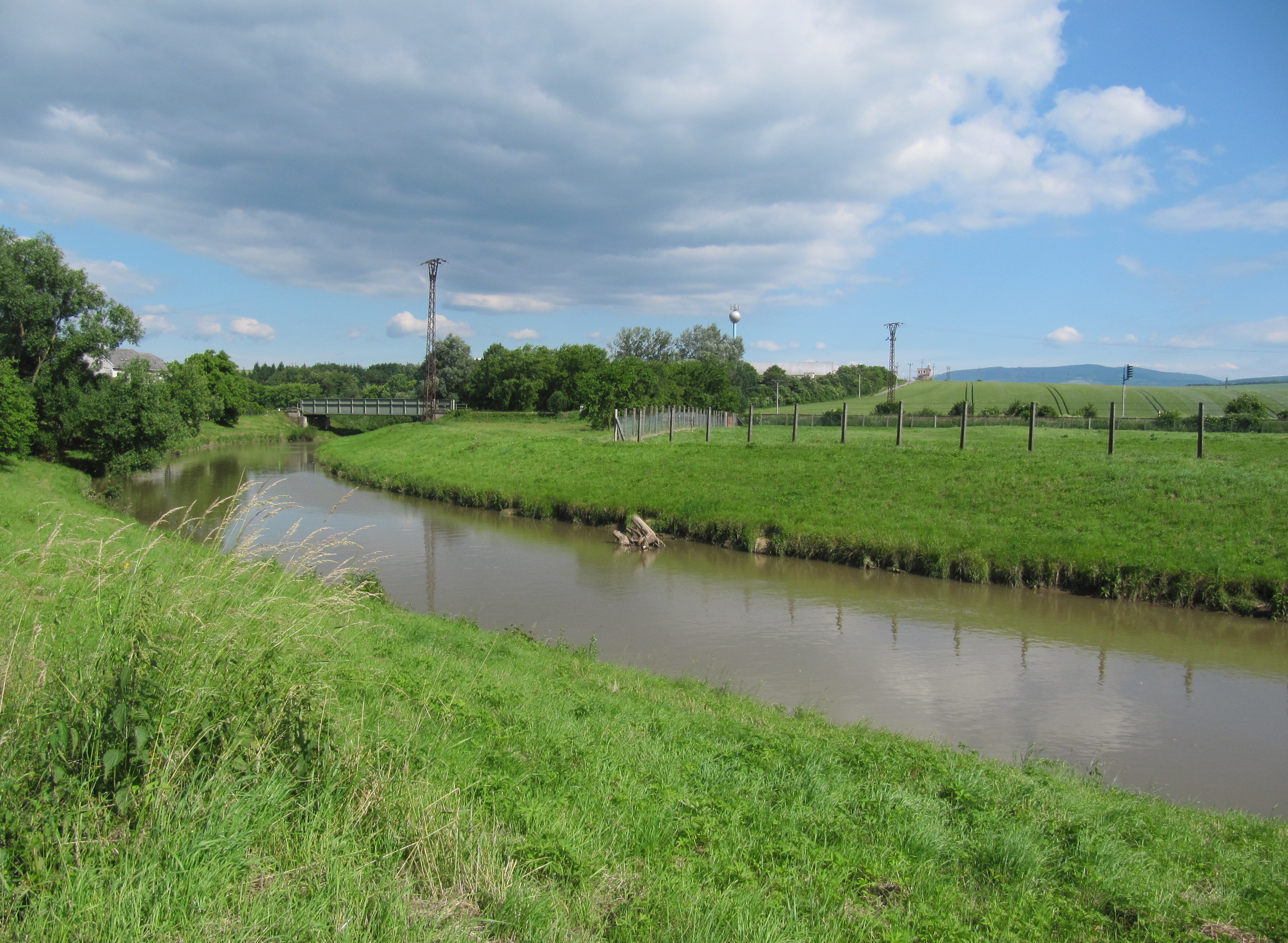
The Olšava River in Uherský Brod-Těšov

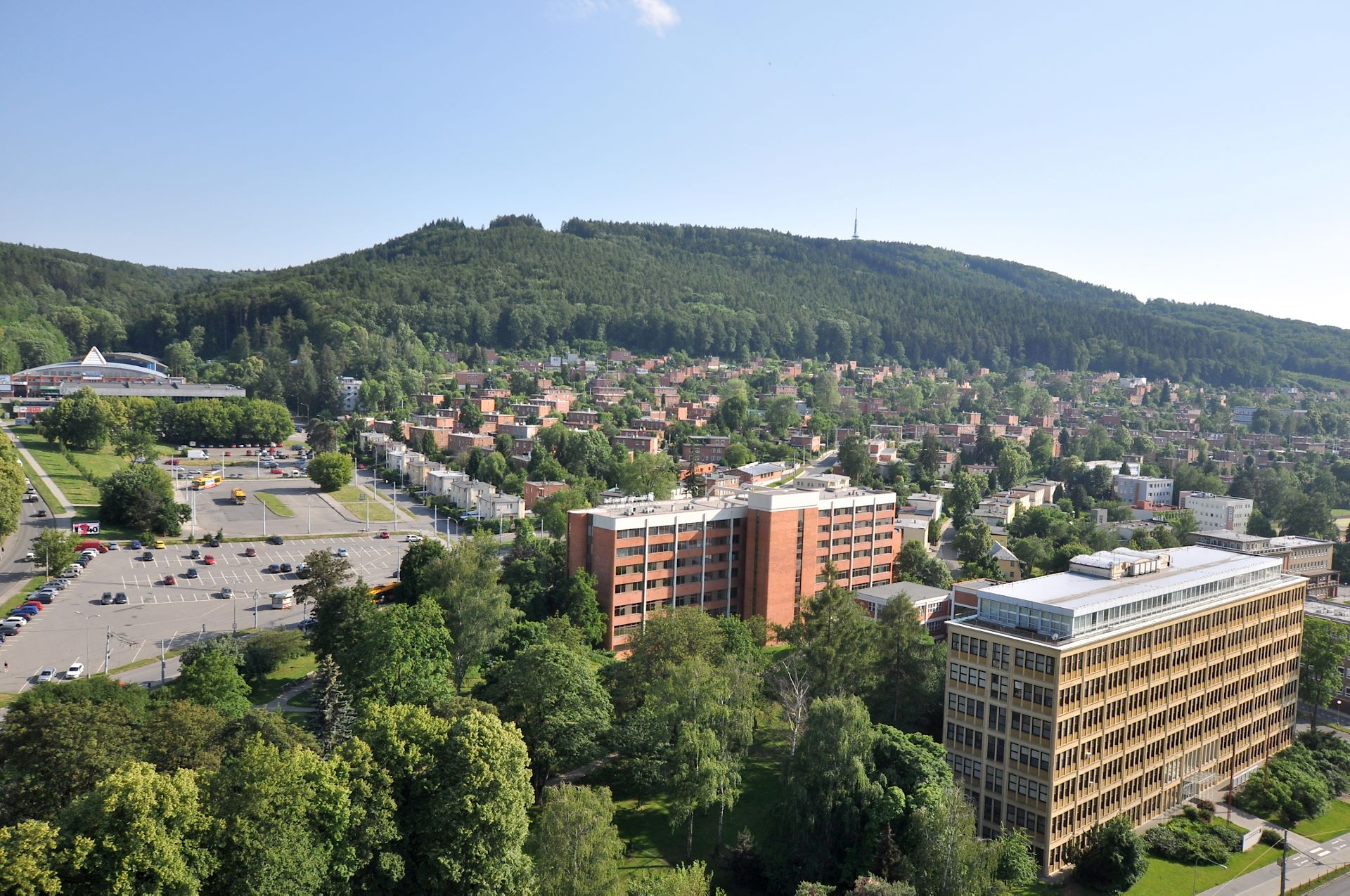
City of Zlín
