= Hluk =

- Town
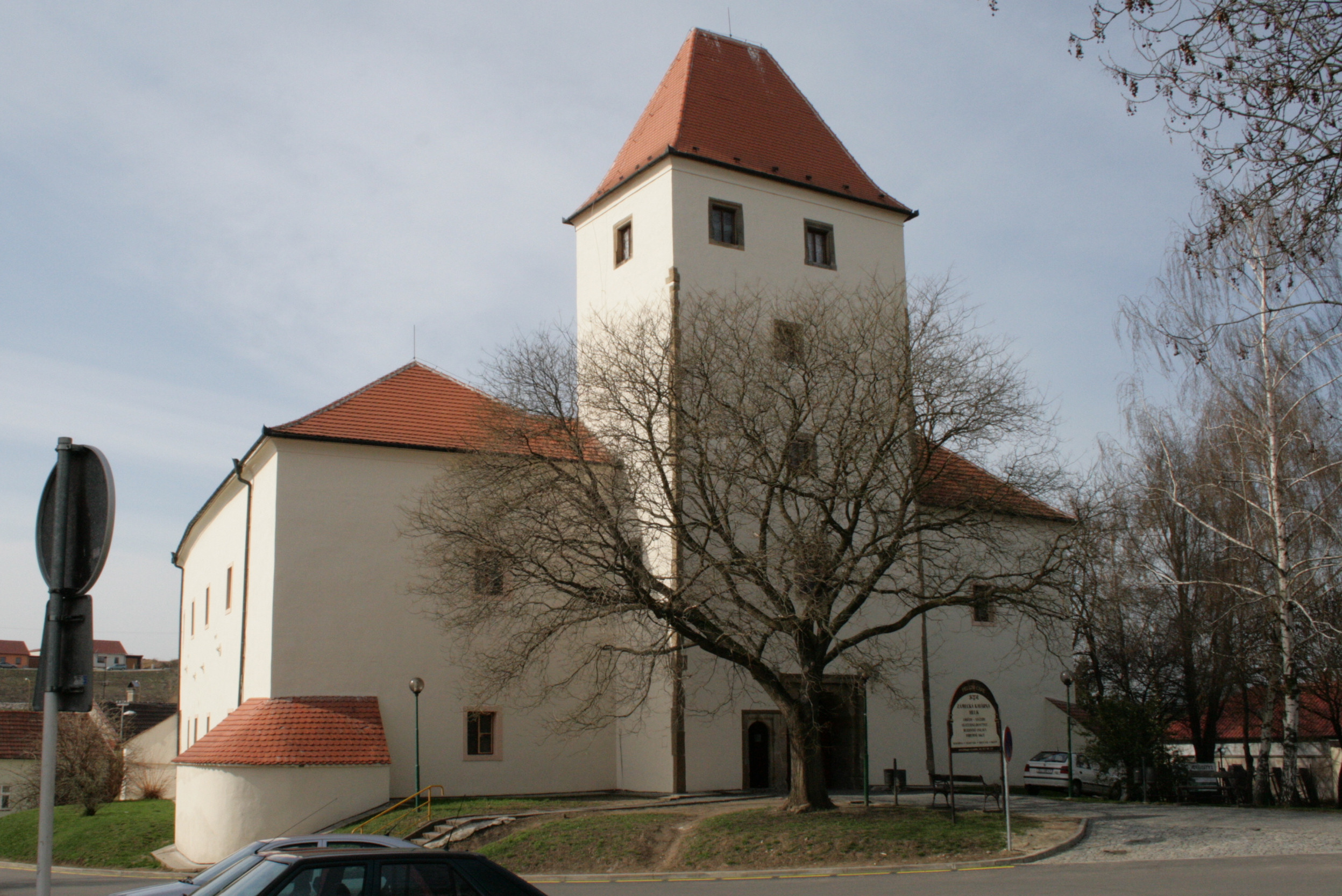
- Hluk Fortress

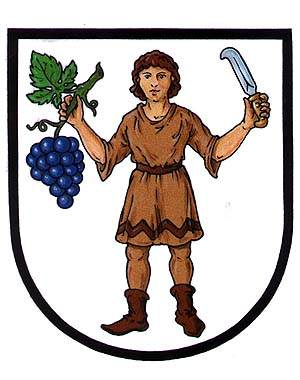
- Flag Coat of arms

- Location in the Czech Republic
- Coordinates: 48°59′17″N 17°31′36″E
- Country: Czech Republic
- Region: Zlín
- District: Uherské Hradiště
- First mentioned: 1294

Government
  - Mayor: David Hájek

Area
  - Total: 28.39 km^{2} (10.96 sq mi)
- Elevation: 222 m (728 ft)

Population (2026-01-01)
  - Total: 4,242
  - Density: 149.4/km^{2} (387.0/sq mi)
- Time zone: UTC+1 (CET)
  - Summer (DST): UTC+2 (CEST)
- Postal code: 687 25
- Website: www.mestohluk.cz

Hluk (Czech pronunciation: [ˈɦluk]; German: Hulken) is a town in Uherské Hradiště District in the Zlín Region of the Czech Republic. It has about 4,200 inhabitants. The town is located on the Okluky Stream in the Vizovice Highlands.

== Etymology ==
The name of Hluk is most likely derived from Latin word hlucium (English: noise, Czech: hluk). It probably got its name from the noisy flowing water of the Okluky Stream.

== Geography ==
Hluk is located about 10 kilometres (6 mi) southeast of Uherské Hradiště and 28 km (17 mi) south of Zlín. It lies in the Vizovice Highlands. The highest point is at 366 m (1,201 ft) above sea level. The Okluky Stream flows through the town.

In the municipal territory are the nature reserve Kobylí hlava and the nature monuments Okluky and Pod Husí horou.

== History ==
The first written mention of Hluk is from 1294. However, the first mention of the wider region called Lucké pole Province is from the 11th century. A wooden fortress in Hluk is first documented in 1303.

In 1525, Hluk was promoted to a market town by King Louis II. In 1970, Hluk became a town.

== Demographics ==
Historical population

Year	Pop.	±%
1869	2,164	—
1880	2,442	+12.8%
1890	2,566	+5.1%
1900	2,857	+11.3%
1910	3,039	+6.4%

Year	Pop.	±%
1921	3,530	+16.2%
1930	3,306	−6.3%
1950	3,410	+3.1%
1961	3,879	+13.8%
1970	3,803	−2.0%

Year	Pop.	±%
1980	4,293	+12.9%
1991	4,362	+1.6%
2001	4,360	−0.0%
2011	4,312	−1.1%
2021	4,130	−4.2%

Source: Censuses

== Economy ==
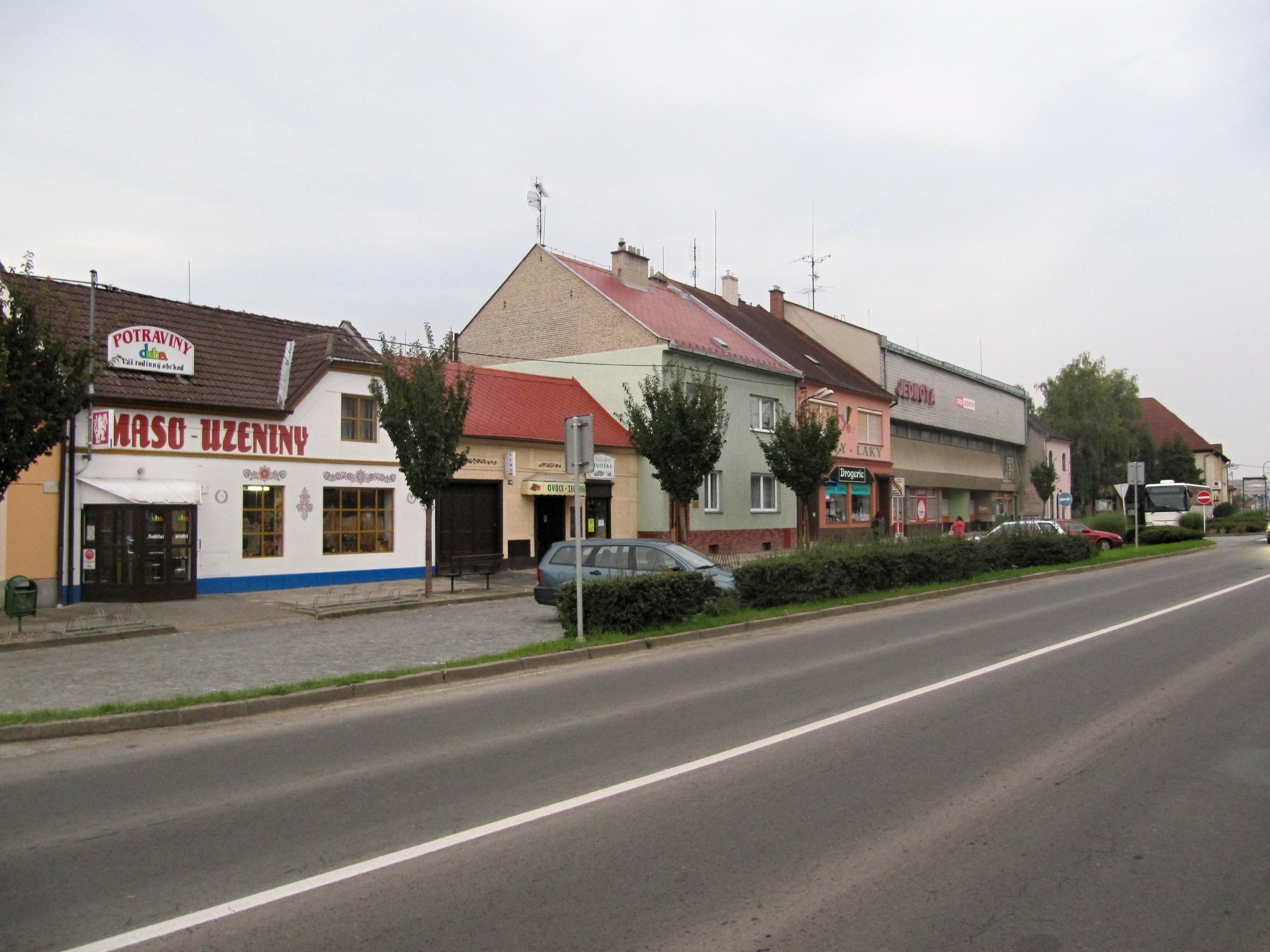
The square Komenského náměstí

There are two significant industrial producers in Hluk. Hanon Systems Autopal company operates a factory for refrigeration and air conditioning components for the automotive industry.

Niob is a company focused on the development, design and manufacture of equipment for the food industry. Since its founding in 1992, it acts as a technical base of the parent company Inotec GmbH.

== Culture ==
Hluk lies in the cultural region of Moravian Slovakia. The town is known for its folklore festival Ride of the Kings, which is on the UNESCO Intangible Cultural Heritage List. It is held every three years, on the first weekend in July. This folk tradition commemorates the historical event when King Matthias Corvinus fled through Hluk in female disguise after losing the battle.

At present, there is a tradition maintained style when through the town is decorated with ribbons and decorated horses transported the little boy in the women national costumes of Hluk, accompanied by costumed lads. The parade is accompanied by hundreds of costumed citizens of the town, surrounding municipalities, foreign and domestic ensembles.

The Ride of the Kings is also linked to an annual brass band festival and a folklore festival.

== Sights ==
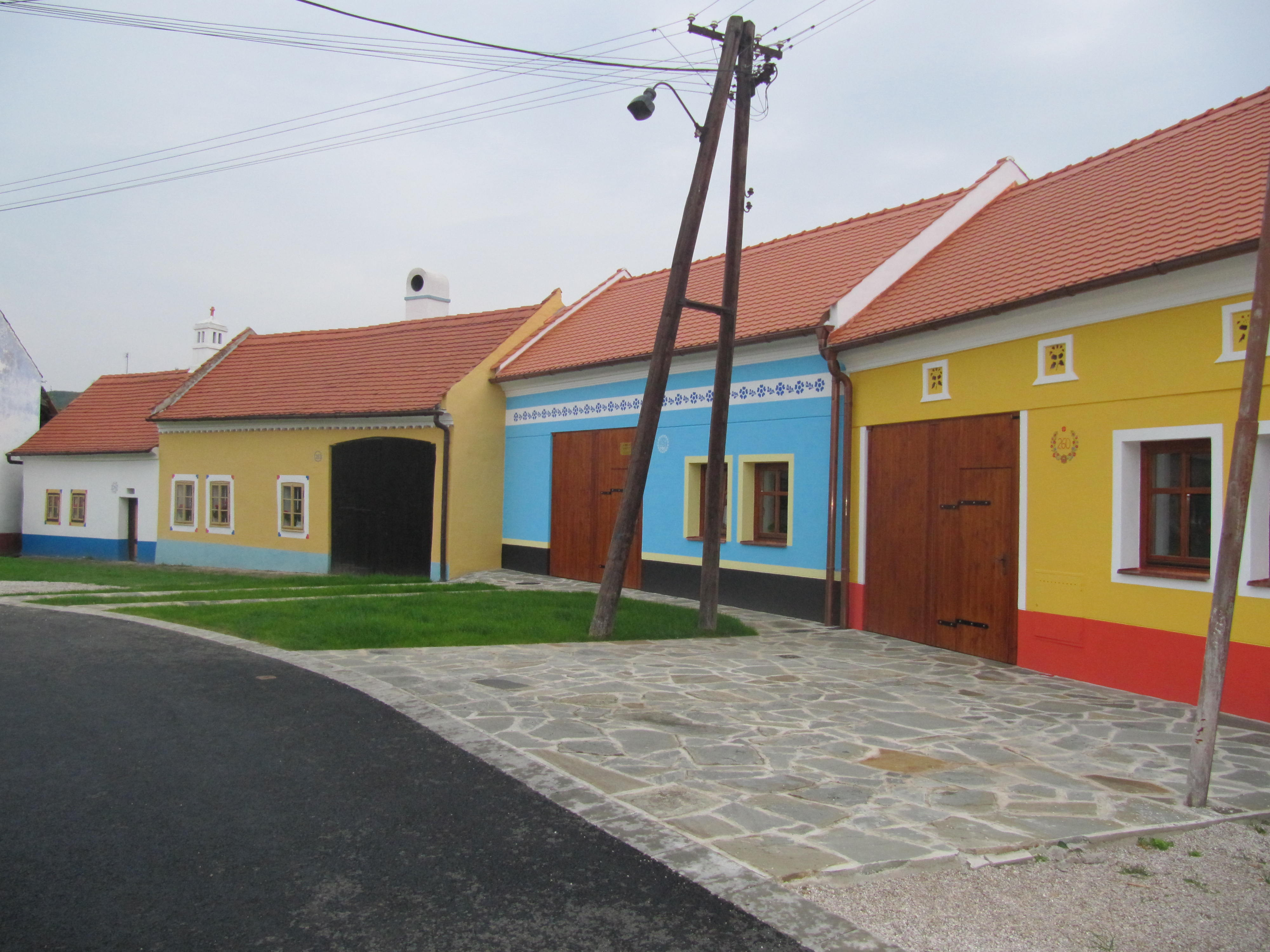
Historic houses in Rajčovna street

The Hluk Fortress is the main landmark of the town. Today it houses the tourist information centre, a library, a ceremonial hall, and spaces for cultural and social events.

In the Rajčovna street, there are historic houses protected as cultural monuments. They are built of unfired bricks, with walls covered with screed of barley chaff, clay and water, repainted with lime. Their roofs of burnt tiles used to be thatched. The houses contain period furniture and fittings.

The Church of Saint Lawrence was built in the Baroque style in 1735–1741.

== Notable people ==
- Käthe Odwody (1909–1997), Austrian resistance activist

== Twin towns – sister cities ==
Hluk is twinned with:

- Nemšová, Slovakia
- Planá nad Lužnicí, Czech Republic

== Gallery ==
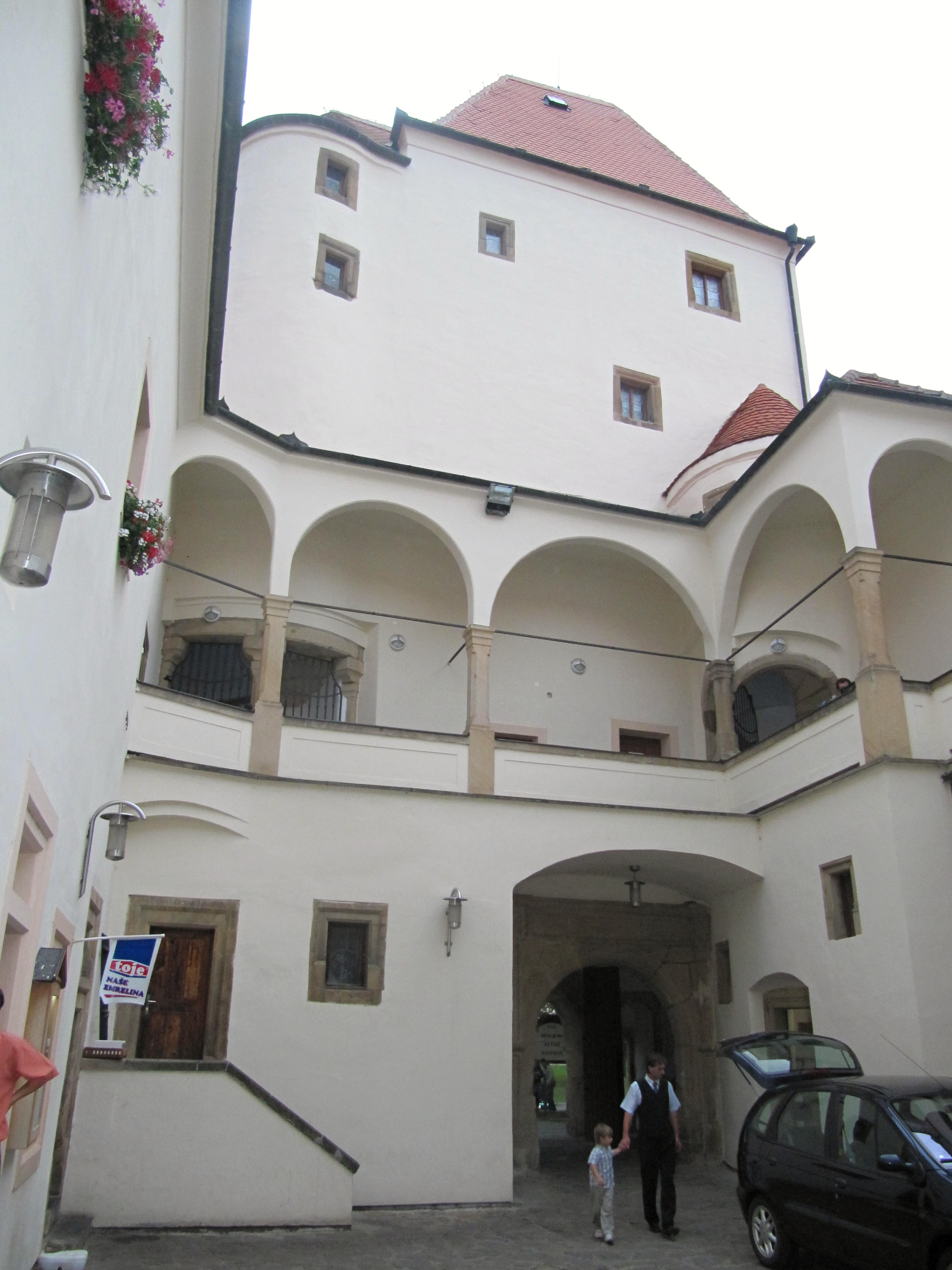
Courtyard of the fortress

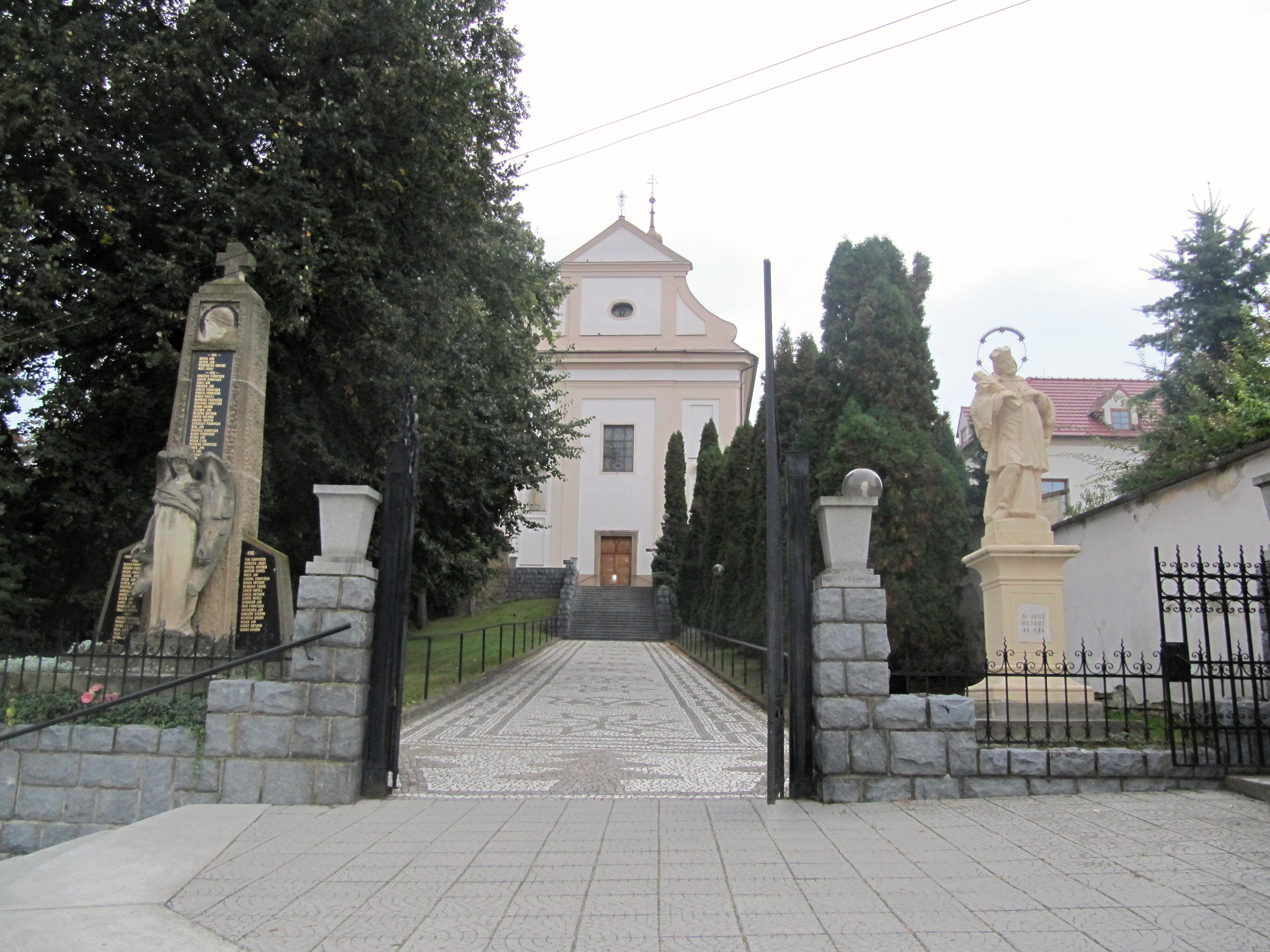
Church of St. Lawrence

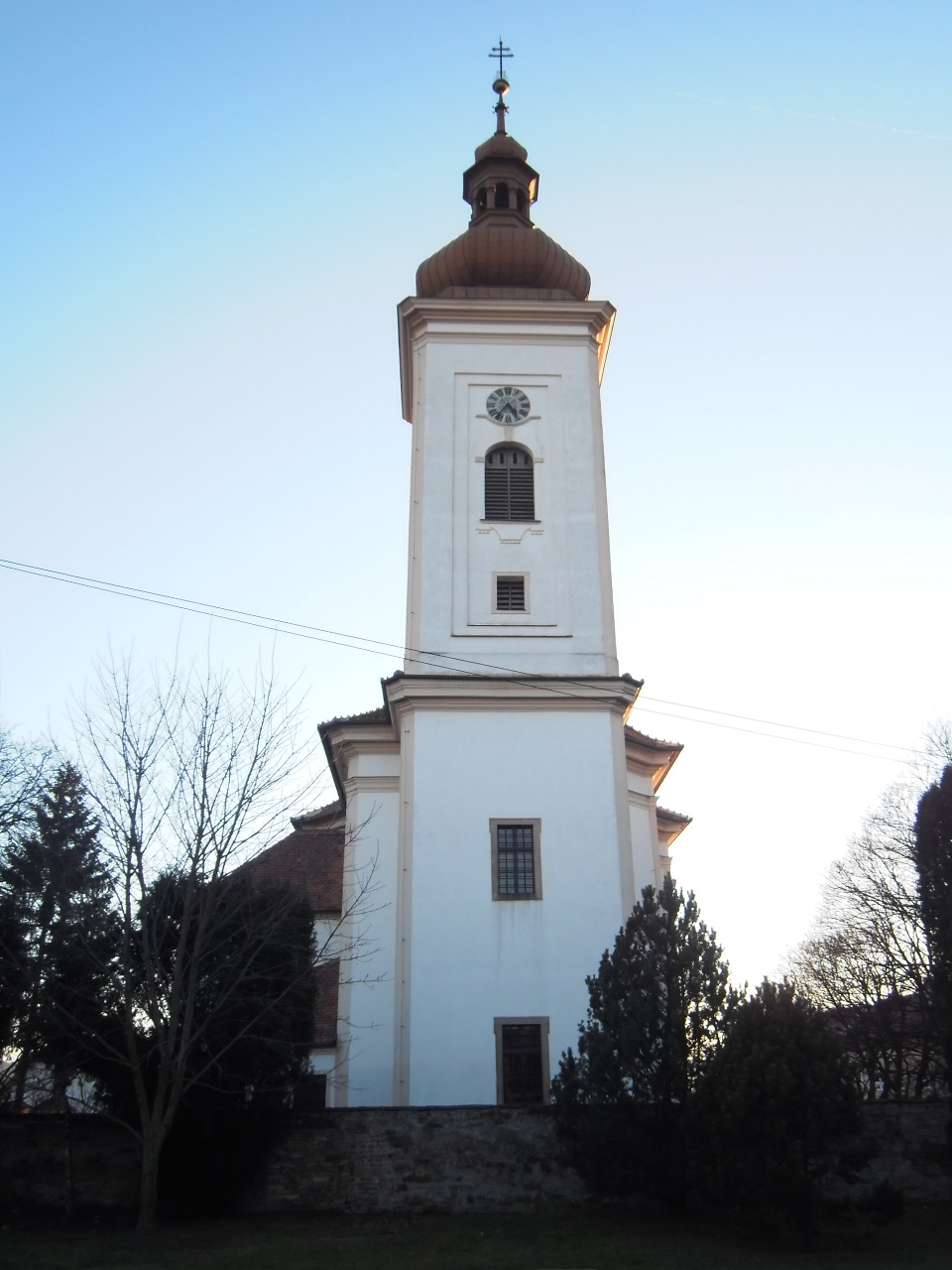
Tower of the Church of St. Lawrence

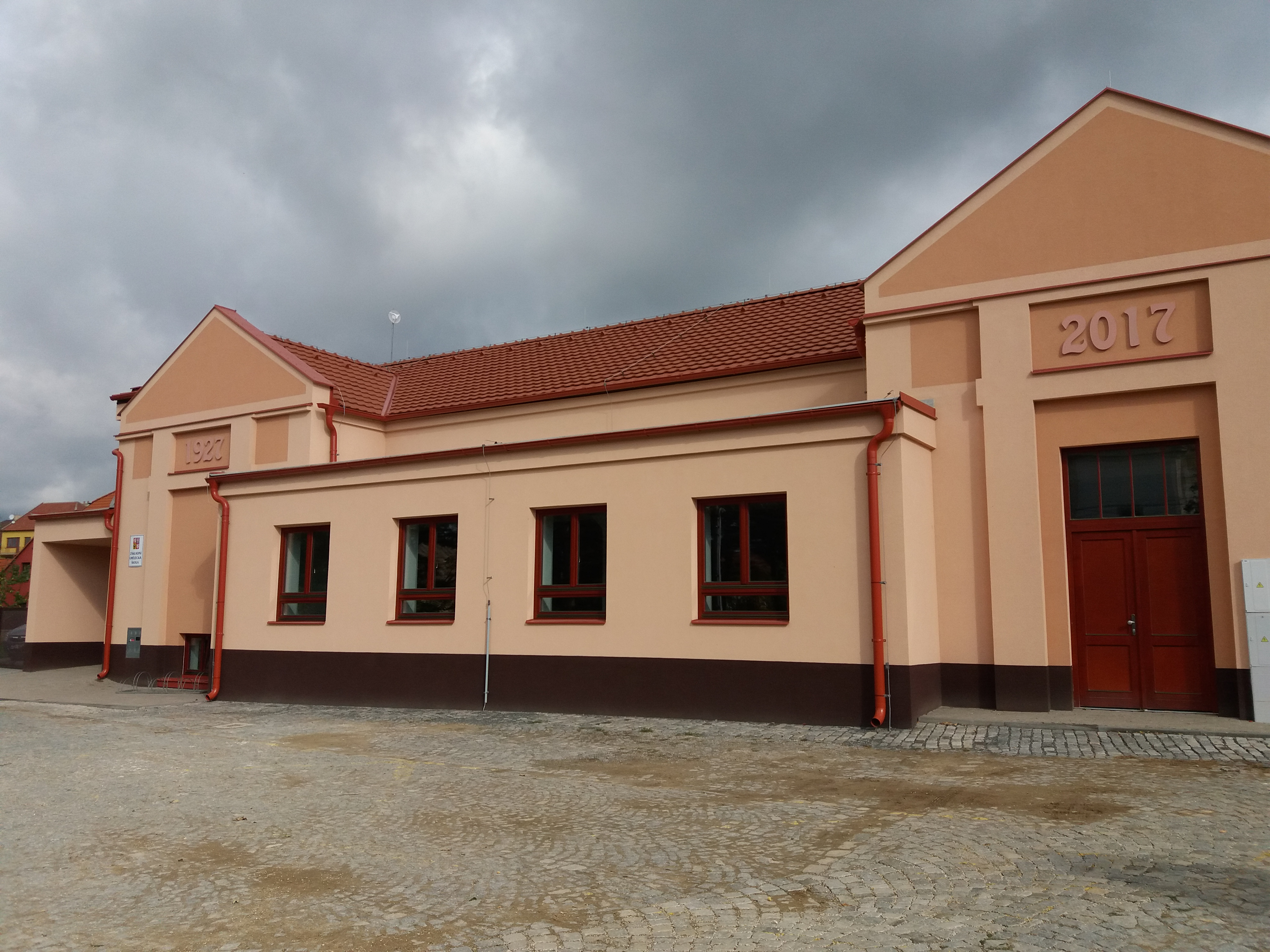
Primary art school
