= Moravian dialects =

Group of dialects of Czech

Moravian
- moravská nářečí
- Native to: Czech Republic, Slovakia
- Region: Moravia and Czech Silesia
- Native speakers: 108,469 (2011 census)
- Language family: Indo-European: Balto-Slavic; Slavic; West Slavic; Czech–Slovak; Czech; Moravian

Language codes
- ISO 639-3: –
- Glottolog: czec1259
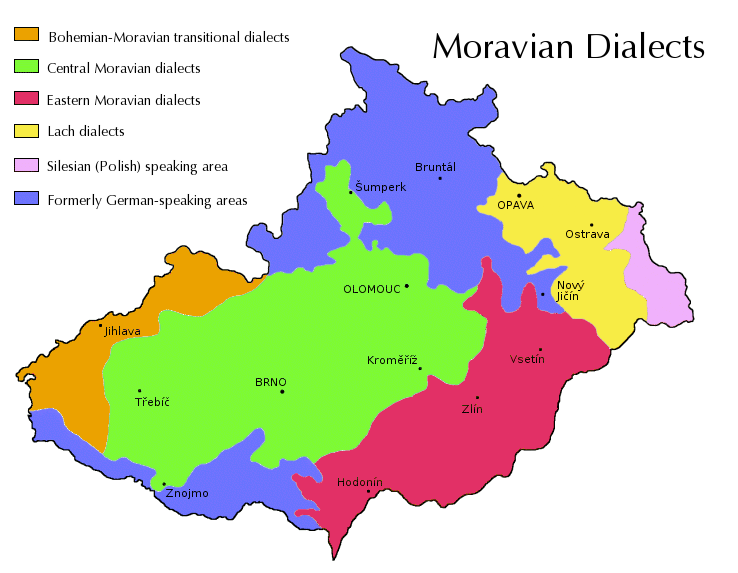
- Map of Moravia and Czech Silesia (borders between the two regions not shown) indicating the major dialect groups: Central Moravian dialects Eastern Moravian dialects Lach dialects Bohemian-Moravian dialects Cieszyn Silesian speaking area Mixed dialects (areas originally inhabited by Germans, resettled after their expulsion in 1945)

Moravian dialects (Czech: moravská nářečí, moravština) are the varieties of Czech spoken in Moravia, a historical region in the east of the Czech Republic. There are more forms of the Czech language used in Moravia than in the rest of the Czech Republic. The main four groups of dialects are the Bohemian-Moravian group, the Central Moravian group, the Eastern Moravian group and the Lach (Silesian) group (which is also spoken in Czech Silesia). While the forms are generally viewed as regional variants of Czech, some Moravians (108,469 in the 2011 census) claim them to be one separate Moravian language.

Moravian dialects are considerably more varied than the dialects of Bohemia, and span a dialect continuum linking Bohemian and West Slovak dialects. A popular misconception holds that eastern Moravian dialects are closer to Slovak than Czech, but this is incorrect; in fact, the opposite is true, and certain dialects in far western Slovakia exhibit features more akin to standard Czech than to standard Slovak.

Until the 19th century, the language used in Slavic-speaking areas of Moravia was referred to as “Moravian” or as “Czech”. When regular censuses started in Austria-Hungary in 1880, the choice of main-communication languages (Note: German: Umgangssprache) in the forms prescribed in Cisleithania did not include Czech language but included the single item Bohemian–Moravian–Slovak (Note: German: Böhmisch-Mährisch-Slowakisch) (the others being German, Polish, Rusyn, Slovene, Serbo-Croatian, Italian, Romanian and Hungarian). Respondents who chose Bohemian–Moravian–Slovak as their main communicating language were counted in the Austrian censuses as Czechs. Moravia at the time comprised large areas, mainly in northern Moravia, in which Moravian German dialects prevailed. These dialects formed a continuum with then German-speaking Silesia.

On the occasion of 2011 Census of the Czech Republic, several Moravian organizations (political party Moravané and Moravian National Community amongst others) led a campaign to promote the Moravian ethnicity and language. The Czech Statistical Office assured the Moravané party that filling in “Moravian” as language would not be treated as ticking off “Czech”, because forms were processed by a computer and superseding Czech for Moravian was technically virtually impossible.

According to the results of the census, there was a total number of 108,469 native speakers of Moravian in 2011. Of them, 62,908 consider Moravian to be their only native language, and 45,561 are native speakers of both Moravian and Czech.

== Dialects ==
While the former regional dialects of Bohemia have merged into one interdialect, Common Czech (with some small exceptions in borderlands), the territory of Moravia is still linguistically diversified. This may be due to absence of a single Moravian cultural and political centre (analogous to Prague in Bohemia) for most of the history, as well as the fact that both of its major cities—Brno and Olomouc—used to be predominantly inhabited by a German-speaking population. The most common classification distinguishes three major groups of Moravian dialects: Central Moravian (Hanakian), Eastern Moravian (Moravian-Slovak) and Silesian (Lach). Some typical phonological differences between the Moravian dialects are shown below on the sentence ‘Put the flour from the mill in the cart’:

Central Moravian:	Dé mókô ze mléna na vozék.
Eastern Moravian:	Daj múku ze młýna na vozík.
Lach:	Daj muku ze mlyna na vozik.
(Standard Czech:	Dej mouku ze mlýna na vozík.)

=== Central Moravian ===
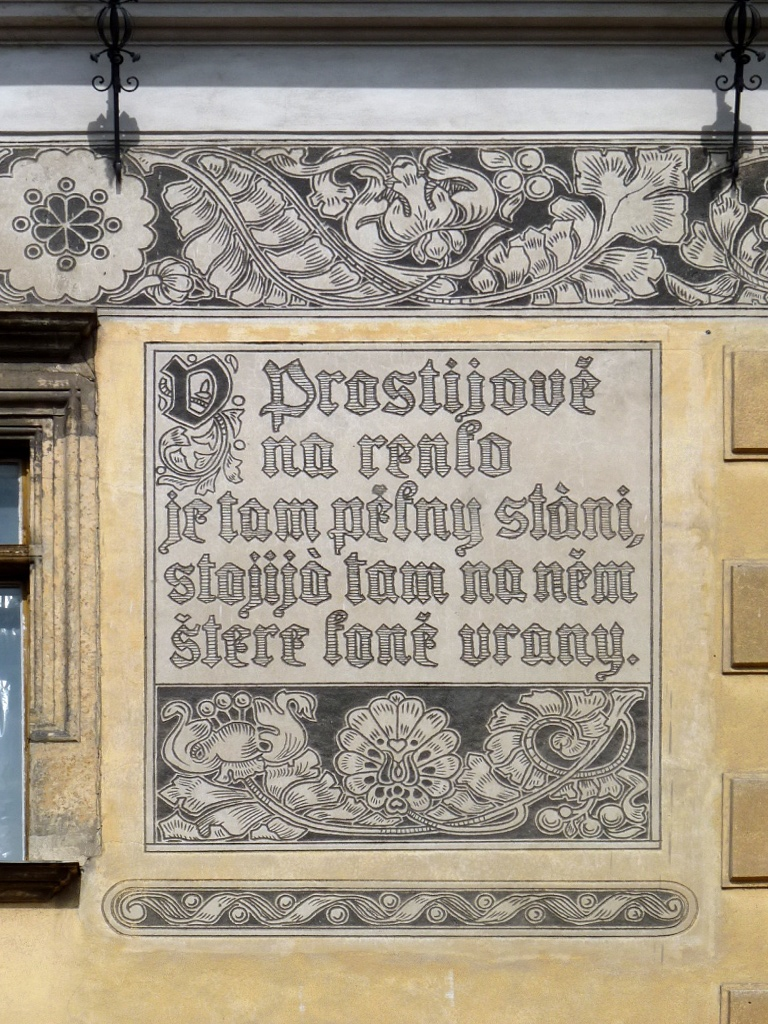
An inscription on the façade of Prostějov castle showing a poem written in Hanakian dialect

Central Moravian dialects, or Hanakian dialects (Hanak dialects, Haná dialects, Czech: hanácké nářečí, hanáčtina), are spoken in the central part of Moravia around Znojmo, Třebíč, Brno, Olomouc, Přerov, Zábřeh and Šumperk. While the Central Moravian group traditionally contained many dialects native to specific microregions, today's spoken language across Central Moravia is moving towards a unified "Common Hanakian dialect" (Czech: obecná hanáčtina). Features of this group include

- A prevalence of the vowels e and é in place of i/y (ryba > reba, život > ževot), í/ý (mlýn > mlén), and ej (nedělej > nedělé).
- O and ó in place of u and ou, respectively (ruka > roka, mouka > móka). By extension, the third person plural ending of verbs which would be -í in standard Czech, and -ej(í) or -ou in Common Czech, is -ijó, or sometimes just -ó in Central Moravian (prosí/prosej(í) > prosijó, hrají/hrajou > hrajijó/hrajó). The instrumental ending -í is also replaced by -ó (s naší kočkou > s našó kočkó).
- The ending -a instead of -e for feminine nouns and possessive adjectives is retained, as in Slovak (e.g. naša slepica for Standard Czech naše slepice).
- The verb “to be” has the 1st person singular present tense form su rather than jsem.
- In contrast to Common Czech, the -l on past tense verbs is always retained (nesl and never nes).

The dialects spoken in and around Brno have seen a lot of lexical influence from Hantec slang, a jargon incorporating many German and Yiddish loanwords into the local Central Moravian dialect. Although by the 21st century the slang had greatly declined in use, some vocabulary from Hantec is still used commonly in everyday speech, for example šalina instead of tramvaj for “tram”, from German elektrische Linie.

The Hanakian dialect has a literary presence. Writers who have written in Hanakian dialect include Alois and Vilém Mrštík, Ondřej Přikryl and Jakub Obrovský. Written Hanakian dialect often distinguishes between "wide" or "open" ê and ô (as in rêba, rôka), and "closed" e and o, to reflect dialects which pronounce these two sounds differently.

==== Smrť kmotřička (example text) ====
Bêl jednó jeden člověk tôze chôdobné na sfětě. Narodil se mô chlapeček, ale nigdo (nihdo) nechtěl mô jiť za kmotra, že bêl tôze chôdobné. Otec si povidá: „Milé Bože, tak sô chôdobné, že mně nihdo nechce poslóžeť v té věce; veznô (vemô) si chlapca, pudô, a keho potkám, teho naptám za kmotra, a nepotkám-lê žádnyho, kostelnik mně přece snaď poslóži.“ Šil a potkal smrť, ale nevěděl, co to je za osobô; bêla pěkná ženská, jako iná ženská. Ptal jô za kmotřêčkô. Ona se nevêmlóvala a hneď ho přêvitala kmôcháčkem, vzala chlapca na rôkê a nesla ho do kostela. Chasnička pokřtilê jak se patři. (full text)

Czech translation:

Byl jednou na světě jeden velmi chudý člověk. Narodil se mu chlapeček, ale nikdo mu nechtěl jít za kmotra, protože byl velmi chudý. Otec si povídá: „Milý Bože, jsem tak chudý, že mi v té věci nikdo nechce posloužit; vezmu si chlapce, půjdu, a koho potkám, toho si najmu jako kmotra, a nepotkám-li nikoho, snad mi přece poslouží kostelník.“ Šel a potkal smrt, ale nevěděl, co je to za osobu; byla to pěkná žena, jako jiná žena. Požádal ji, aby šla za kmotru. Ona se nevymlouvala a hned ho oslovila „kmotříčku“, vzala chlapce na ruce a nesla ho do kostela. Chasníčka pokřtili, jak se patří.

=== Eastern Moravian ===
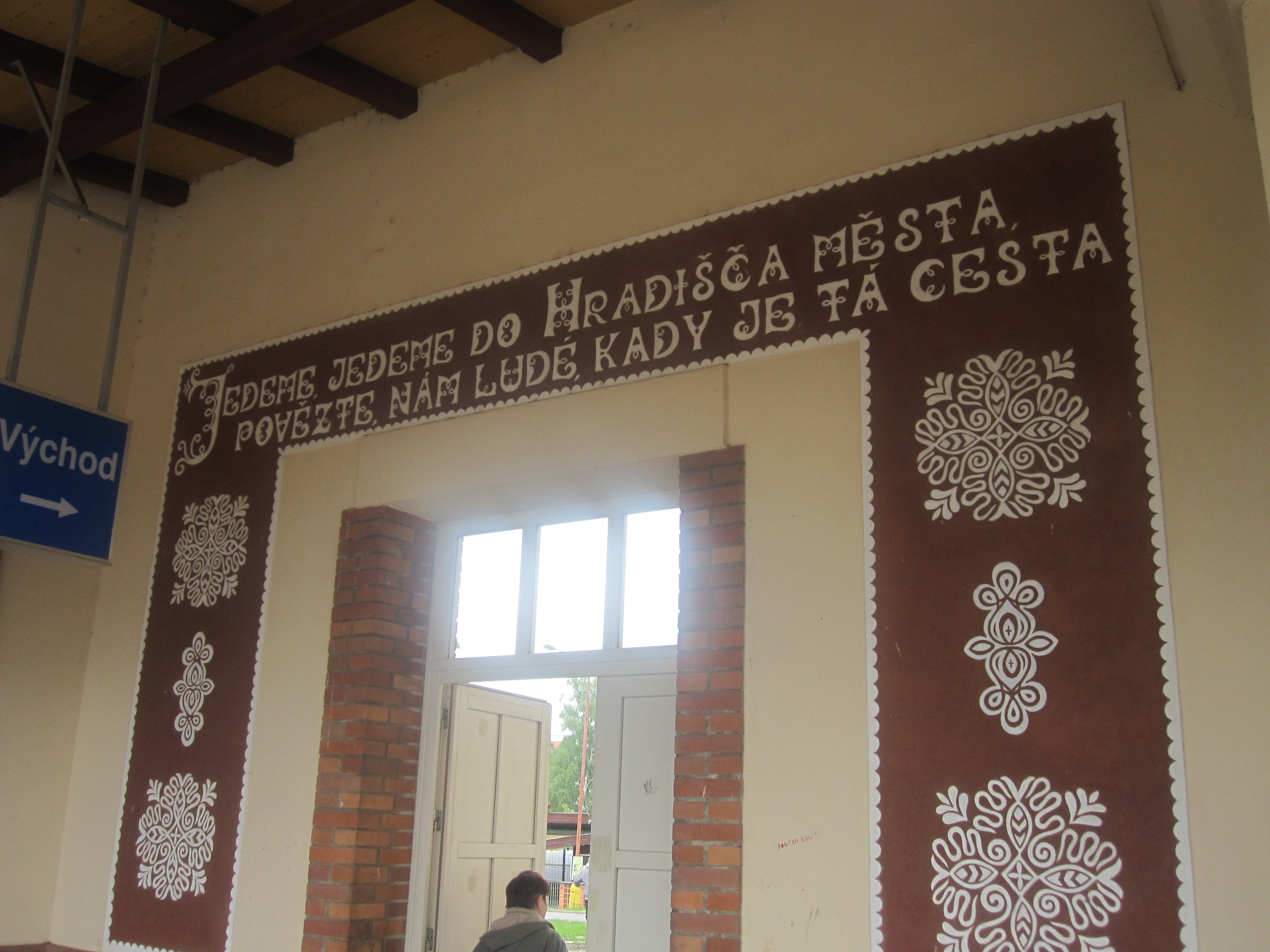
A mural at Uherské Hradiště railway station with two lines of poetry written in an Eastern Moravian dialect

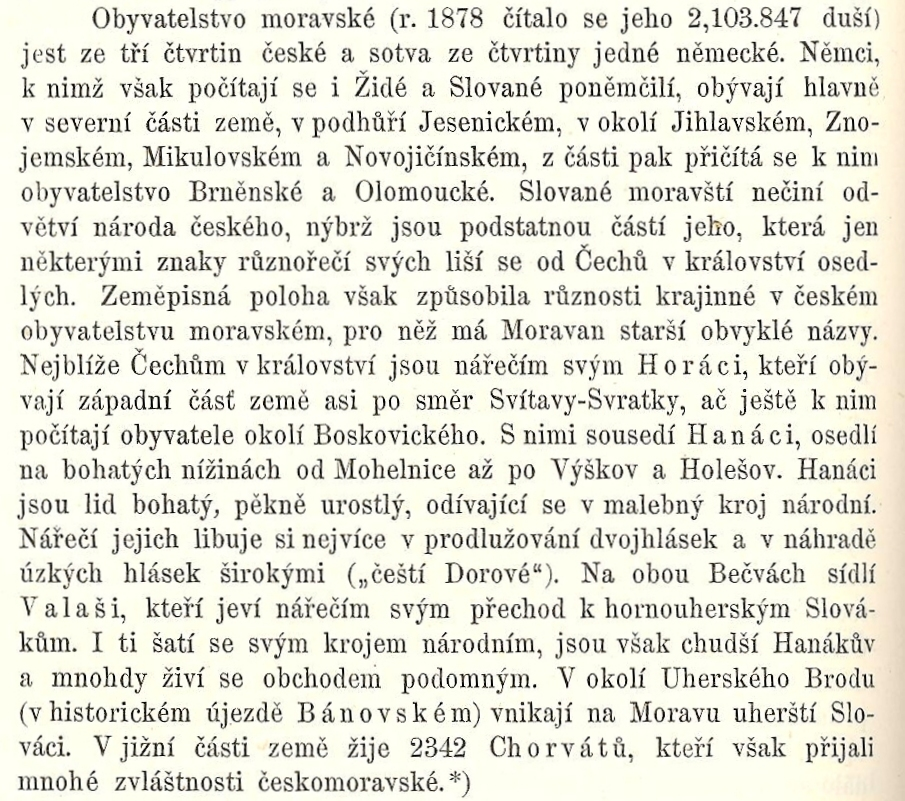
A page from a popular encyclopedia describing the ethnic composition of Moravia in 1878, along with the Moravian dialects. This writing identifies the Wallachian dialect as a transitional dialect between Czech and Slovak, while the inhabitants of Moravian Slovakia are described as Slovaks.

Eastern Moravian dialects are transitional dialects between Czech and Slovak. They are spoken in the strip of land extending from Břeclav to Hodonín, Kyjov, Uherské Hradiště, Zlín and Vsetín. The Eastern group contains two dialects of specific interest, the Moravian Wallachian dialect (Czech: valašské nářečí, valašština) and the Moravian-Slovak dialect (Czech: slovácké nářečí, moravská slovenština). Features of Eastern Moravian dialects include:

- The distinction between soft l and hard ł (pronounced [w]) is usually retained (hlava, dělat = hłava, děłat). By extension, the final -l in past tense verbs is often rendered -u.
- aj sometimes retained instead of ej (vejce = vajco, dej = daj).
- ů is sometimes replaced with o (kůň = koň)
- In contrast to Common Czech, -ý- always prevails over -ej- (dobrý, strýc and never dobrej, strejc).
- Infinitives end in -ť rather than -t, as in Slovak (být = býť)
- The Moravian-Slovak dialect shares several other features with Slovak, including the use of the long ĺ and ŕ (hloubka = hĺbka, hrnout = ohŕňat).
- Wallachian dialects preserve the present transgressive, which is usually considered archaic in standard Czech aside from in a few arbitrary phrases.

=== Lachian dialects ===
Lachian dialects (Lach dialects, Czech: lašské nářečí, laština), spoken in north-eastern Moravia and the adjacent regions of Silesia around Opava, Ostrava, Frýdek-Místek and Frenštát pod Radhoštěm, are transitional dialects sharing more features of Polish. Defining phonological features include loss of distinction between long and short vowels, a feature colloquially known as “krátký zobák” (“short beak”) in Czech, stress shifted to the penultimate syllable of the word, as in Polish, rather than the first syllable, alveolar consonants d, t and n often shifted to their palatal counterparts, and a distinction between “hard” (post-alveolar or retroflex) š, ž, č and “soft” (alveolo-palatal) ś, ź, ć, as in Polish. Silesian dialects also contain many German loanwords unfamiliar to other Czech dialects. The Lachian dialects are closely related to the Cieszyn Silesian dialect, spoken in the area around Karviná, Český Těšín and Třinec as well as on the Polish side of the border.

=== Bohemian-Moravian dialects ===
Bohemian-Moravian dialects, or South-eastern Bohemian dialects, spoken in the Bohemian-Moravian Highlands in western Moravia around Dačice, Jihlava and Žďár nad Sázavou are a transitional group between dialects of Bohemia and Moravia, sharing some features in common with Common Czech and others more in common with Central Moravian.

== Linguistic features ==
=== Phonology ===
Moravian dialects preserve numerous archaic phonological features that are no longer used in contemporary Czech, but can still be found in many other Slavic languages. The following tables list selected cognates, pointing out the archaisms and showing their equivalents in the other languages:

==== Absence of the Czech á > e vowel shift ====
Czech	Moravian	Slovak	Polish	Upper Sorbian	Lower Sorbian	Russian	Ukrainian	Slovenian	Prekmurje dialect	Serbo-Croatian	English
naše	naša	naša	nasza	naša	naša	наша (naša)	наша (naša)	naša	naša	naša	our (fem.)
ovce	ovca	ovca	owca	wowca	wójca	овца (ovca)	вівця (vivcja)	ovca	ovca	ovca	sheep
zmije	zmija	zmija	żmija	zmija	zmija	змея (zmeja)	змія (zmija)	—	—	zmija	viper; snake
moře	mořa	mora	morza	morja	mórja	моря (morja)	моря (morja)	morja	mourja	mora	sea (gen.)
koně	koňa	koňa	konia	konja	konja	коня (konja)	коня (konja)	konja	konja	konja	horse (gen.)
pole	pola	poľa	pola	pola	póla	поля (polja)	поля (polja)	polja	polá	polja	field (gen.)

==== Absence of the Czech ú > i vowel shift ====
Czech	Moravian	Slovak	Polish	Upper Sorbian	Lower Sorbian	Russian	Ukrainian	Slovenian	Prekmurje dialect	Serbo-Croatian	English
duši	dušu	dušu	(duszę)	dušu	dušu	душу (dušu)	душу (dušu)	dušo	düšo	dušu	soul (acc.)
ulici	ulicu	ulicu	(ulicę)			улицу (ulicu)	вулицю (vulycju)	ulico	vulico	ulicu	street' (acc.)
chci	chcu	(chcem)	(chcę)	chcu	cu	хочу (choču)	хочу (choču)	(hočem)	(ščém)	(ho)ću	I want
moři	mořu	moru	morzu	morju	mórju	морю (morju)	морю (morju)	morju	mourji	moru	sea (dat.)
poli	polu	poľu	polu	polu	pólu	полю (polju)	полю (polju)	polju	poli	polju	field (dat.)
ji	ju	ju	(ją)	ju	ju	её (jejo)	її (jiji)	jo	jo	nju/ju/je	her (acc.)

==== Retaining the -šč- group ====
Czech	Moravian	Slovak	Polish	Upper Sorbian	Bulgarian	Macedonian	Russian	Ukrainian	Belarusian	Slovenian	Prekmurje dialect	Kajkavian	Serbo-Croatian	English
ještě	(j)ešče	ešte	jeszcze (ješče)	hišće	още (ošte)	уште (ušte)	ещё (jeśśo)	щe (šče)	яшчэ (jašče)	še	ešče	jošče, išče	još	still, yet

==== Retaining palatal consonants ====
Czech	Moravian	Slovak	Polish	Upper Sorbian	Bulgarian	Macedonian	Russian	Ukrainian	Belarusian	Slovenian	Prekmurje dialect	Serbo-Croatian	English
snad	snaď	snáď	snadź/snać (Note: obsolete)	snadź	снад (snad)	снад (snad)							hopefully
radost	radosť	radosť	radość	radosć	радост (radost)	радост (radost)	радость (radost')	радість (radist')	радасць (radasc')	radost	radost	radost	joy
den	deň	deň	dzień	dźeń	ден (den)	ден (den)	день (d'en')	день (den')	дзень (dz'en')	dan	dén	dan	day

=== Grammar ===
While Moravian grammar tends to be similar to Czech grammar, there are some defining features. For instance, Moravian dialects apply a uniform pattern to the 3rd person plural ending of class IV -it verbs, and class III -et verbs, which in standard Czech traditionally varied in an unintuitive fashion:

Standard Czech (infinitive)	Haná dialect	Moravian-Slovak dialect	meaning
prosí (inf. prosit)	prosijó	prosijú	they beg
trpí (inf. trpět)	trpijó, trpějó	trpijú, trpějú	they suffer
sází, sázejí (inf. sázet)	sázijó, sázejó	sázijú, sázejú	they sow

Moravian dialects also occasionally use prepositions in a different fashion to Standard and Common Czech, usually mirroring usage in Slovak (e.g. něco k jídlu > něco na jídlo for "something to eat", Slovak: niečo na jedlo) or Polish (e.g. pojď ke mně > choď do mě, for "come to me", Polish: chodź do mnie).

== Standardisation ==
Since the end of the 20th century, the private association Moravian Language Institute (Ústav jazyka moravského), founded by amateur linguist Jan Kozohorský, has made attempts to standardise a literary Moravian language. The movement has been criticised by linguistics professors at Masaryk University in Brno as controversial and with strong political undertones.

== Notes ==
Content notes

Citations
