= Käthe Odwody =

Käthe Odwody (born Katharina Wanek; 6 March 1901 – 23 September 1943) was an Austrian worker at a commercial bakery and trades union officer who became a communist resistance activist against the Dollfuß dictatorship and, after 1938, against the National Socialist ("Nazi") régime. Her cover name within the Siegl resistance group was "Walli". She was executed, along with two of her resistance comrades, by guillotine at the district court complex in Vienna on 23 September 1943.

== Biography ==
Katharina "Käthe" Wanek was born in Hulken in Austria-Hungary (today Hluk in the Zlín Region of the Czech Republic), about 160 kilometres (99 mi) to the north-east of Vienna. She was youngest of the six children of the farm workers Franz and Maria Wanek. The family relocated to Vienna in 1905.

She attended the junior school in the Favoriten quarter on the southern side of the city for six years and then undertook a succession "assistant" jobs. In 1921 she married Franz Odwody, a machinist-assistant five years older than she. He emigrated to America in 1922 but returned to Vienna in 1924. That year Käthe was recruited to work at the Ankerbot bakery, Austria's leading industrial bakery, where she worked till 1934, also serving on the factory's works council. She was active as a member of the Austrian Free Trades Union of Food and Drink Workers between 1923 and 1934. The Ankerbot bakery was well known as a centre of labour activism. Back in 1918 employees had created a "workers' army" of around 1,000 men to protect the factory: this ad hoc militia had at that time been one of the largest quasi-military organisations in Vienna. During the short-lived (and brutally suppressed) insurrection in February 1934 the factory became a centre for the anti-government protection league and other socialist resistance groups. Workers responded to the strike call of the trades union movement and many were involved in armed street fighting against forces backing the post-democratic Dollfuß régime. The protection league member Alexander Scheck, whose shooting by government forces on 13 February 1934 marked the collapse of the resistance, was an Ankerbot worker.

Käthe Odwody herself was among the Ankerbrot workers arrested in the aftermath of the street fighting. She was held in custody between 17 February and 11 May 1934. It was only a few weeks after her release, on 14 June 1934, that she was charged at the Vienna district court with "Insurrection and High Treason" ("Aufstand und Hochverrat"). She was acquitted. However, the court also dismissed her claim for compensation because the "suspicion that she had participated in the disturbances" had not been sufficiently invalidated. The indictment against her had alleged that during the days of fighting she had loaded up the gun belts of the fighters with cartridges in the canteen used by the bakery "coachmen" (delivery drivers). Despite her acquittal she lost her job with the bakery and remained unemployed till 1938.

In March 1938 Fascist Austria was formally incorporated into an enlarged Nazi Germany following a largely unresisted military invasion from the north-west. That year Käthe Odwody returned to her job at the Ankerbot bakery. It was also that year that the factory owners, the Mendl family, whom the authorities had identified as Jewish, escaped to Switzerland. The factory was expropriated by the authorities and "aryanised" but it remained a focus of trades union activism. At the start of 1939 a strike took place at the factory against the equalisation of payroll taxes (which before 1938 had been much higher in Germany than in Austria). There had been no compensating wage increase at the bakery to compensate. The Gestapo crushed the strike and intensified their surveillance and supervision activities at the plant.

Odwody reacted by joining the (since 1933 illegal) Communist Party. In Autumn 1940 she was accepted into the local leadership team ("Bezirksleitung") for the Favoriten district of Vienna, which was still her home. She became a party official and contributed to party work by collecting membership subscriptions and secretly distributing Die Rote Fahne ("Red Flag"), the party newspaper. She became a member of the so-called "Siegl Group", a resistance group which took its name from the cover name used by its leader, Rudolf Fischer. Odwody's own cover name in the group was "Walli".

Rudolf and Maria Fischer were arrested on 29 April 1941. Franz and Käthe Odwody were arrested the same day. Franz was suspected of having collaborated with his wife in respect of her resistance activities. He was nevertheless released on 17 May 1941. His wife remained in state custody. Rudolf and Maria Fischer were executed at the district court complex on 28 January 1943 and 30 March 1943. Käthe Odwody finally faced the special people's court in Vienna on 9 November 1942. The charge was the usual one under these circumstances of "preparing to commit High Treason" ("Vorbereitung zum Hochverrat"). She was convicted and sentenced to death. Like her comrades the Fischers she was executed on the guillotine which the authorities had installed at the district court complex in 1938, shortly after the annexation of Austria.

Käthe Odwody's execution took place on 23 September 1943. A report of it was prepared the next day:

- "The death sentence was carried out on the convicted prisoners Karl Tomasek, Anna Muzik und Katharina Odwody on 23 September 1943, between 18.07 hrs and 18.23 hours. The executions proceeded without any unusual incidents and each lasted a few seconds. - Execution record: 24 September 1943".

== Celebration ==
In 1946 a memorial tablet to Käthe Odwody and others was placed outside the Ankerbot premises at Absberggasse 35. In 2004 a street in Vienna-Favoriten was named after her.
