= Moravians =

Czech ethnographic group

Moravané
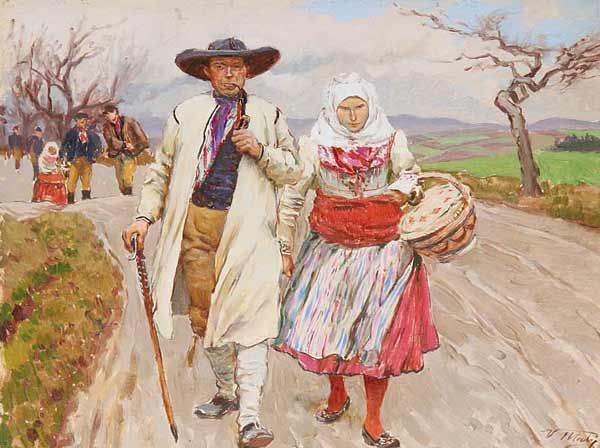
- Moravians, painted by Vaclav Maly

Total population
- 560,000

Regions with significant populations
- Czech Republic: 556,641(2021)
- Slovakia: 2,049 (2021)

Languages
- Czech (Moravian dialects), Silesian, Slovak

Religion
- Roman Catholicism (majority) also Irreligion Protestantism (minority)

Related ethnic groups
- Bohemians, Chodové, Silesians, Slovaks and other West Slavs

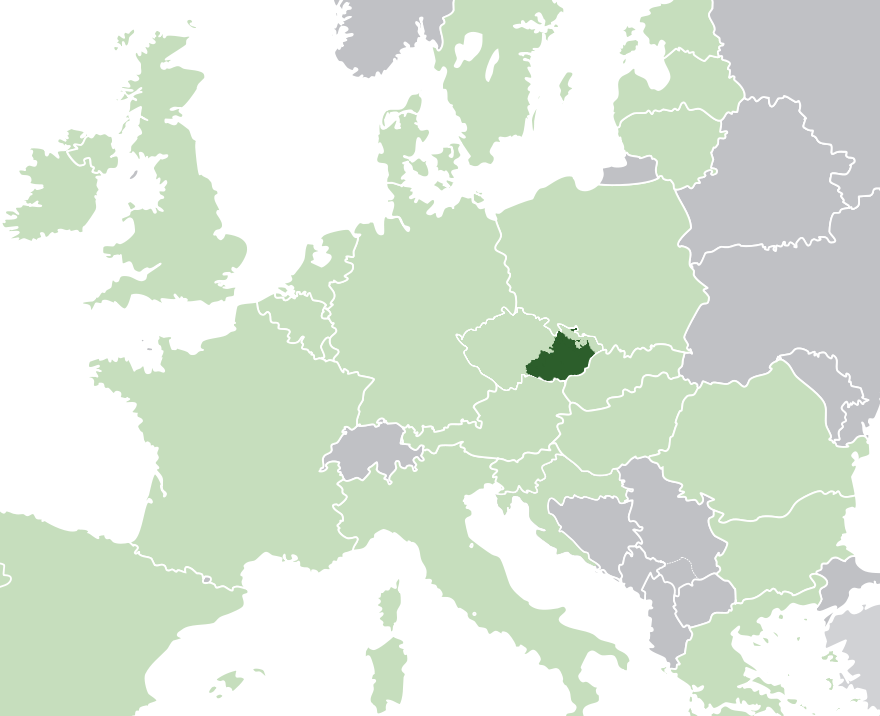
Moravia within the European Union

Moravians (Czech: Moravané or colloquially Moraváci, outdated Moravci) are a Czech ethnographic group from the Moravia region of the Czech Republic, who speak the Moravian dialects of Czech or Common Czech or a mixed form of both. They are typically considered a subgroup of the Czech ethnic group, but a part of the group's population identifies as ethnically Moravian. This identity has been registered in Czech censuses since 1991, and in the 2011 census 6.01% of the Czech population declared Moravian as their ethnicity. Smaller pockets of people declaring Moravian ethnicity are also present in neighboring Slovakia.

== Etymology ==
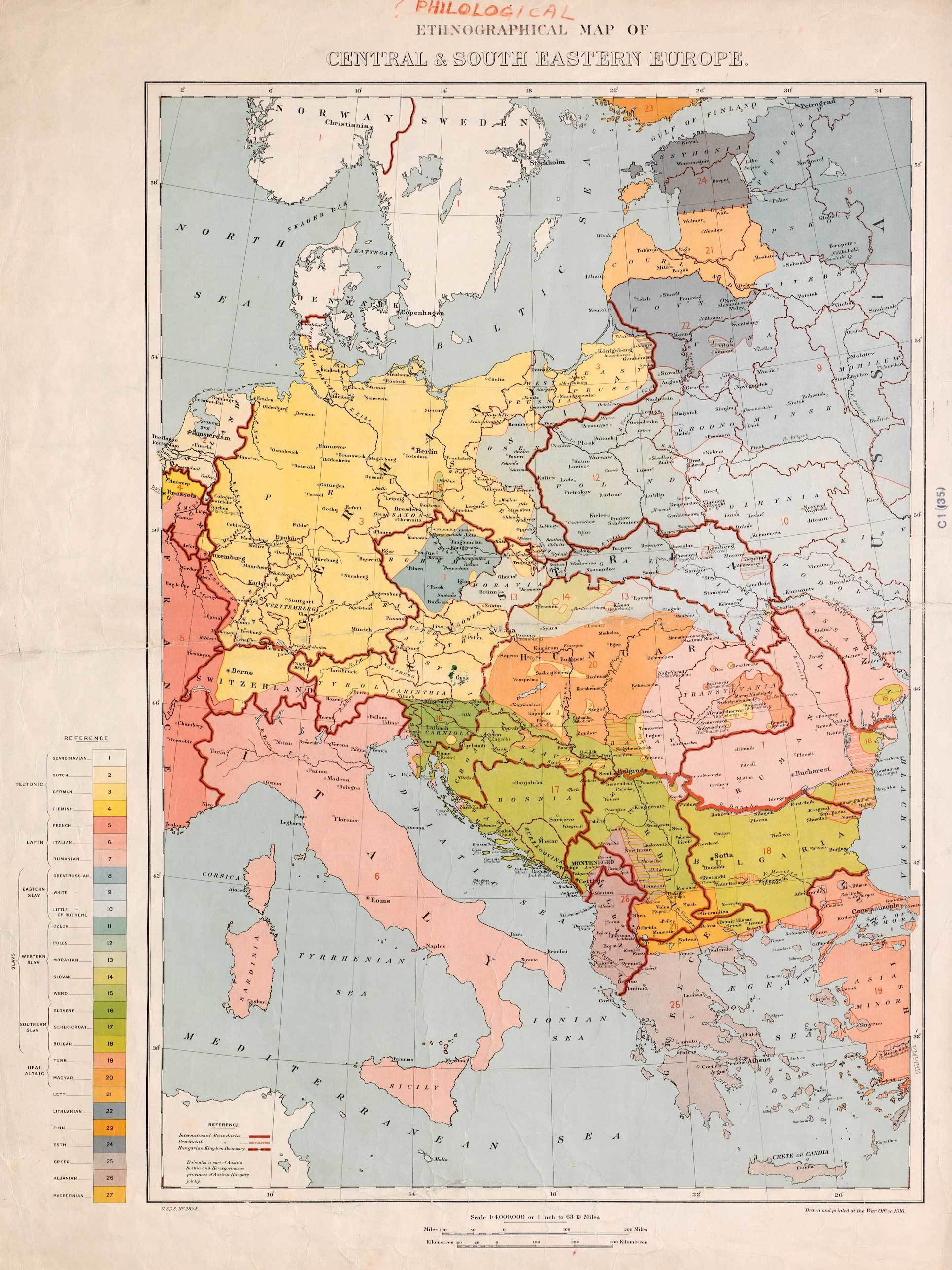
Moravians on the map (War Office, 1918)

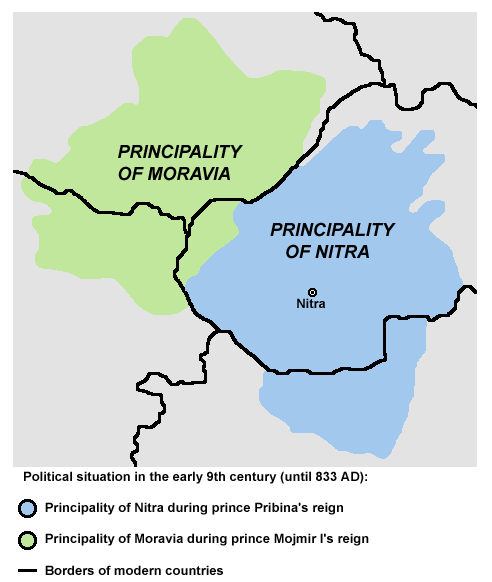
The Moravian principality in 833 (green) is shown crossing the modern Czech–Slovak–Austrian border tripoint.

Flag of Moravians. Used for example by the deputies of Czech speaking Moravians on Slavonic Congress in Prague in 1848.

Banner of arms of Moravia, in use since the 13th century

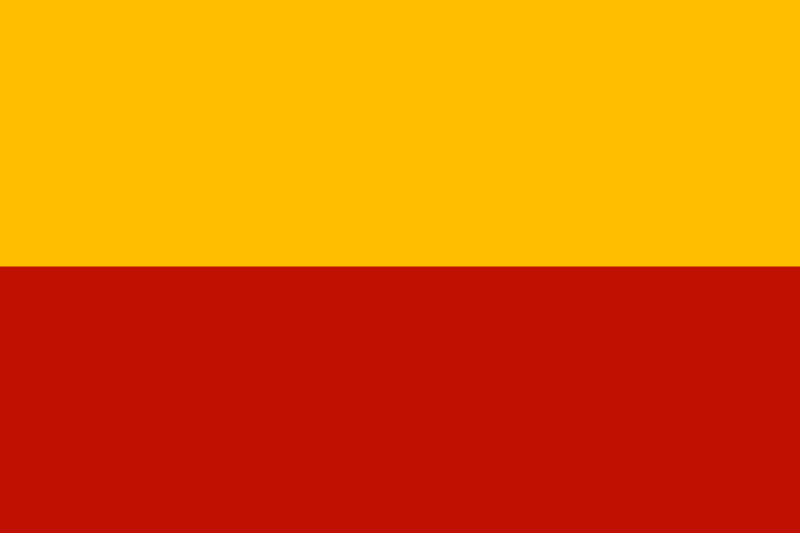
Yellow-red bicolour used simultaneously with other bicolours and tricolours since the second half of 19th century

A certain ambiguity in Czech derives from the fact that it distinguishes between Čechy (Bohemia proper) and Česko (Czech Republic as a whole), but the corresponding adjective český and noun designating an inhabitant and/or a member of a nation Čech can be related to either of them. The adjective bohémský and the noun bohém ('Bohemian') carry only the meaning of a "socially unconventional person".

== History ==
=== Moravian tribe ===
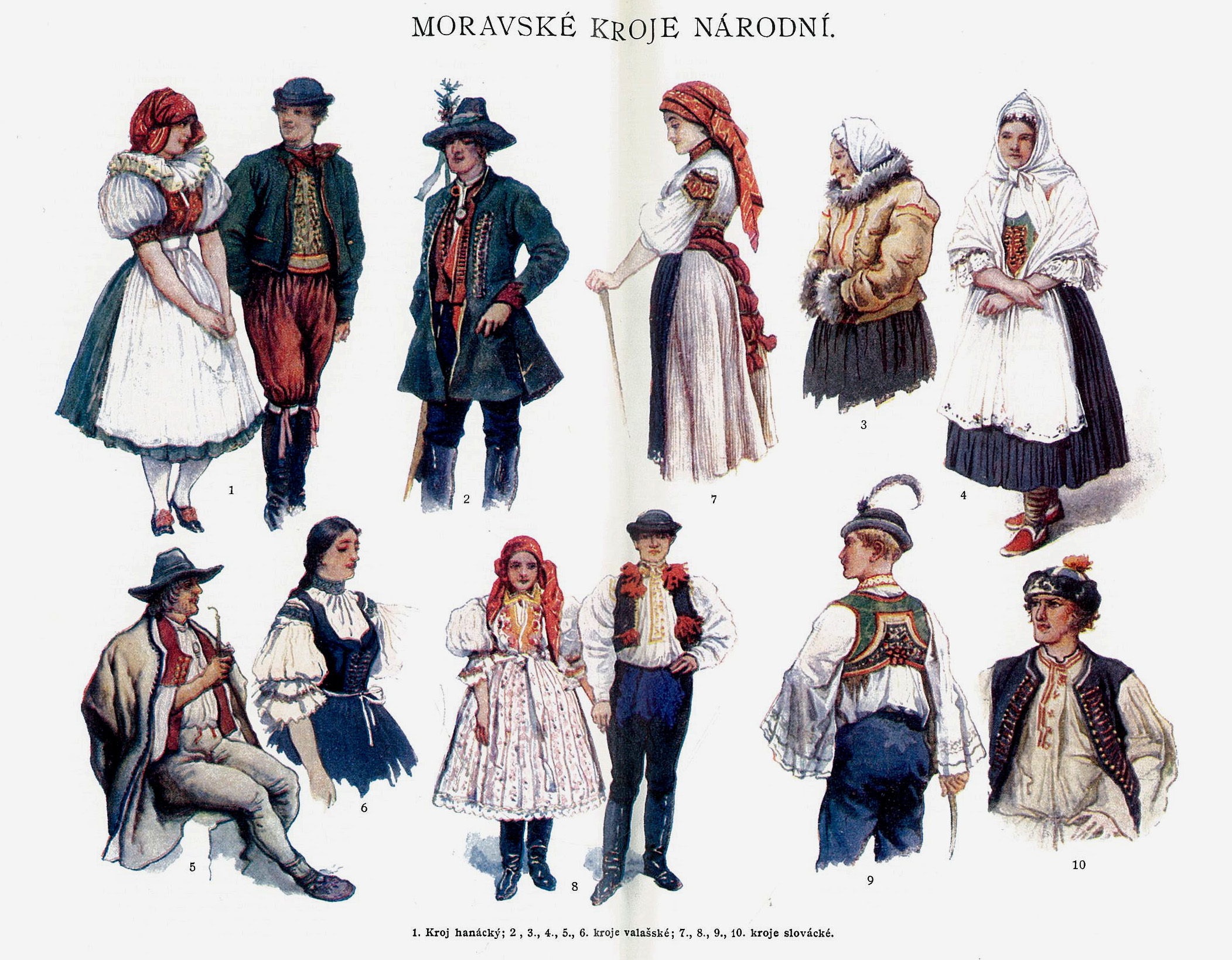
Moravian traditional costumes

The Moravians (Old Slavic self-designation Moravljane, Slovak: Moravania, Czech: Moravané) were a West Slavic tribe in the Early Middle Ages. Although it is not known exactly when the Moravian tribe was founded, Czech historian Dušan Třeštík claimed the tribe was formed between the turn of the 6th century to the 7th century, around the same time as the other Slavic tribes.

In the 9th century, Moravians settled mainly around the historic Region of Moravia and Western Slovakia, but also in parts of central-southern Poland, and Lower Austria (up to the Danube) The first known mention of the Moravians was in the Annales Regni Francorum in 822 AD. The tribe was located by the Bavarian Geographer between the tribe of the Bohemians and the tribe of the Nitrans.

In the 9th century, Moravians gained control over neighbouring Nitra and founded the Realm of Great Moravia, ruled by the Mojmír dynasty until the 10th century. At times, the empire controlled even other neighboring regions, including Bohemia and parts of present-day Hungary, Poland and Ukraine. It emerged into one of the most powerful states in Central Europe.

After the breakup of the Moravian Realm, the Moravian tribe was under the rule of the new state of Bohemia. Moravians were assimilated by the Czechs and presently identify as Czechs. The modern nation of the Slovaks was formed out of the nitran tribe within the Kingdom of Hungary.

=== Moravians within the Czech lands ===
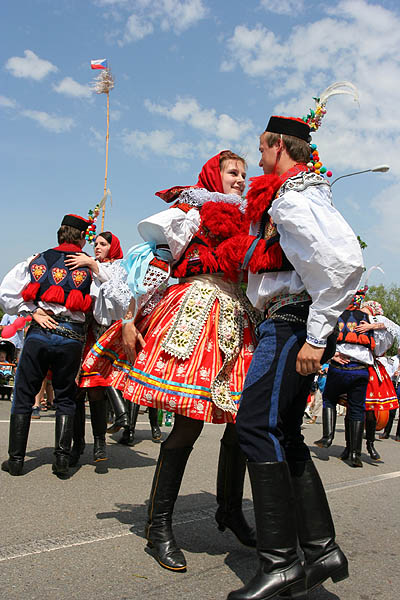
Traditional Moravian costumes during festival

Bretislaus I, Duke of Bohemia, in solving the succession question in his will (he had five sons) decided to completely reorganize Moravia, so that it should be governed by the younger sons of the royal family. It was still considered one country, but from an objective standpoint it was weakened, and Moravia could not lead to the formation of the medieval "nation" as quickly as in Bohemia. The way leading to the differentiation of the Moravians from the Czechs was caused by political and economic changes of the late 12th and early 13th century. Czech historical tradition was grown in Moravia during the Middle Ages, for example Czech Chronicles was reread and distributed.

Until the beginning of the 20th century, the Slavic-speaking inhabitants of Moravia publicly identified themselves as Moravians, not Czechs. Then, for fear of Germanization, Moravians would begin to publicly refer to themselves as Moravian Czechs — joining a stronger neighbour. But internally they still felt their nationality (for example, here). Slovaks (and by extension, Rusyns) were considered as Czechs by politicians, too. In the Czechoslovak and communist eras, Moravian nationality would be banned, so for the first time since the fall of the dangers of Germanization (1945), Moravian nationality appeared in the 1991 census.

After the Velvet Revolution a strong political movement to reinstate the Moravian-Silesian land (země Moravskoslezská in Czech, since it was one of the four lands of Czechoslovakia between 1928 and 1939, was active in Moravia. Accordingly, the officially-united Czech ethnicity was split in line with the historical division of the Czech Republic into Bohemia, Moravia and Czech Silesia (the Czech lands). Some of the Czech-speaking inhabitants of Moravia declared Moravian ethnicity, and some of the Czech speaking inhabitants of Czech Silesia declared Silesian ethnicity.

There were 1,363,000 citizens of the Czechoslovakia who declared Moravian ethnicity in 1991. However, the number dropped to 380,474 in the 2001 census: many persons previously declaring themselves as Moravians declared themselves again as Czechs in this census. In 2011, the number increased again to 630 897. The strongest sense of patriotism towards Moravia is found in the environs of Brno, the former capital of Moravia. However, the results of the census are skewed by the fact that most Moravians do not know that they can sign up for the Moravian nationality, but would use the option, according to a 2011 survey.

Only in the first years after the Velvet Revolution in 1989 did a few Moravian political parties seem to be able to gain some success in elections. However, they lost much of their strength around the time of the dissolution of Czechoslovakia in 1993 when Czechoslovakia peacefully split into the Czech Republic and Slovak Republic.

According to the 2011 census, the percentage of people without religion was the lowest in the Moravian Zlín Region, followed by the partly-Bohemian, partly-Moravian, Vysočina Region; the South Moravian Region; the Moravian-Silesian Region; and the predominantly-Moravian Olomouc Region.

== Moravian nationality ==
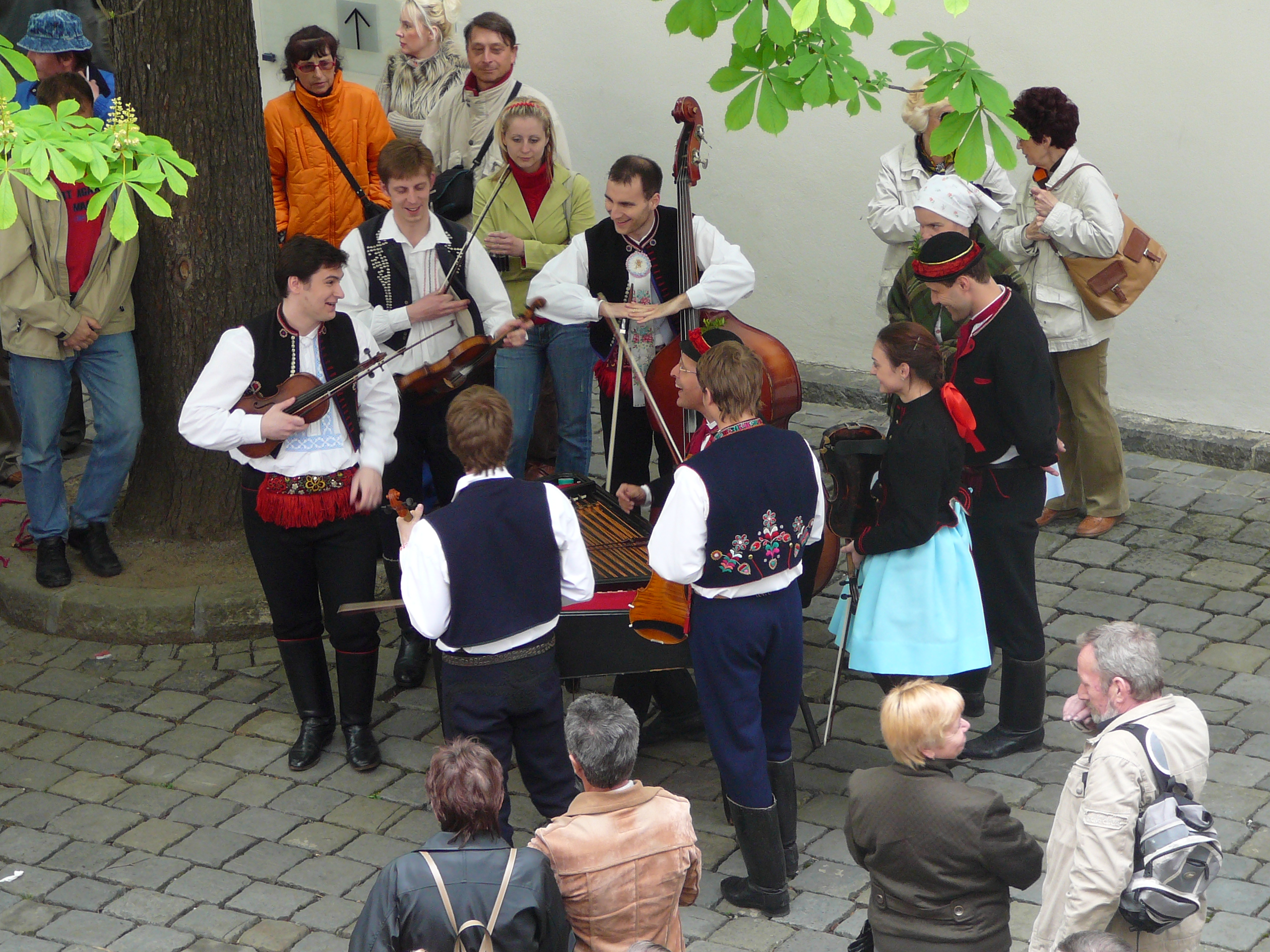
Moravians at festivities at Špilberk Castle in Brno

Most Czech-speaking inhabitants of Moravia identify with Czech nationality. In 1991, according to the Czech Statistical Office (ČSÚ), the official Czech nationality category was divided into Czech, Moravian, and Silesian nationalities. According to the conclusions of the Czech Statistical Office, Moravian national consciousness was to some extent artificially stimulated by media attention to the issue of Moravian nationality. The ČSÚ supports this claim by pointing to the large difference in the number of people declaring Moravian nationality in the 1991 and 2001 censuses: in 2001, nearly one million people who had identified as Moravian in 1991 returned to declaring Czech nationality.

In relation to population censuses in the Czech Republic, representatives of Moravian organizations (the Moravian and Silesian Information Centre and the Moravané political party) have consistently demanded that Moravian and Silesian nationality be explicitly listed on census forms, and that in Moravia and Silesia these options be placed first. The Czech Statistical Office responded before the 2011 census that Moravian nationality could indeed be entered and would, as since 1991, be processed separately. This differed from Czechoslovak censuses, where Moravian nationality was not recognized and people declaring it were automatically counted as Czech. However, the request to have Moravian nationality pre-printed on census forms was rejected. By contrast, Slovakia included Moravian nationality directly as an option on its census form.

According to the 1991 census, 1,362,313 citizens of the Czech Republic (13.2% of the population) declared Moravian nationality. By the 2001 census, this number had dropped significantly to 380,474 people (3.7% of the population). Compared with 1991, nearly one million people again identified as Czech, and the highest concentration of people declaring Moravian nationality was found in the South Moravian Region.

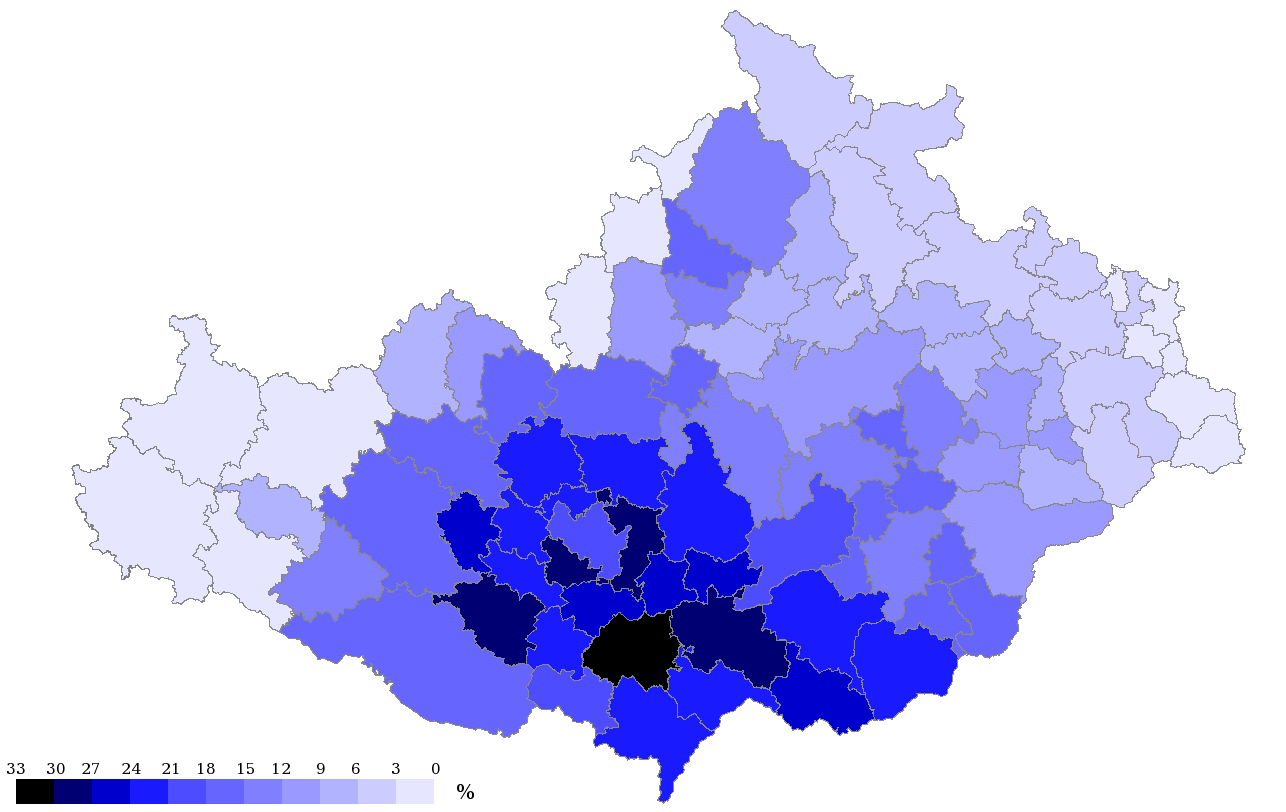
Moravian ethnicity in Moravia, Czech Silesia and adjacent areas of Bohemia according to 2011 census results

According to the 2011 census, the number of people declaring Moravian nationality increased again to 630,897, representing 6.3% of the population of the Czech Republic. The highest proportion was again recorded in the South Moravian Region (21.8%), followed by the Zlín Region (16.3%), the Olomouc Region (12.0%), and the Vysočina Region (7.0%).

Within Moravia and Silesia, 513,555 people declared Moravian nationality as their sole nationality, representing 12.9% of the population. When combined with dual nationality declarations, more than 610,000 people in Moravia and Silesia identified as Moravian, approximately 15.3% of the population.

On June 1, 2021, the Ministry of Justice of the Czech Republic commented on a parliamentary proposal to amend the law on national minorities:

Návrh zákona výslovně uzná postavení příslušníků moravské národnosti jako příslušníků národnosti české s tím, že se na ně nevztahuje právní úprava pro národnostní menšiny.

“The bill explicitly recognizes persons of Moravian nationality as belonging to the Czech nationality, meaning that the legal framework for national minorities does not apply to them.”

The ministry justified this position by stating:

Moravané, respektive občané České republiky na Moravě, tvoří součást českého národa a nelze je považovat za jinou než českou národnost ve smyslu zákona o obcích.

“Moravians, or citizens of the Czech Republic living in Moravia, form part of the Czech nation and cannot be regarded as a nationality other than Czech within the meaning of the Municipalities Act.”

For this reason, according to the ministry, Moravians are not considered a national minority.

People also declare Moravian nationality in Slovakia, where Moravians currently constitute the country's seventh-largest national minority.

=== Choice of nationality in the population census ===
Since the 1991 census, following the establishment of complete freedom to choose one's nationality (under the Charter of Fundamental Rights and Freedoms, individuals may subjectively choose any nationality regardless of its objective existence or non-existence), respondents in the Czech Republic have also been able to declare a distinct Moravian nationality.

The number of people identifying as Moravian in subsequent censuses fluctuated considerably and never again reached the 1991 level. There was a sharp decline in 2001, a moderate increase in 2011, and another decline in 2021. Currently, a total of 549,373 people (including those declaring dual nationality) identify as Moravian, while the majority of Moravia's inhabitants identify as Czech.

Before the 2021 census, pro-Moravian activists conducted an information campaign highlighting the possibility of declaring Moravian nationality. Part of this campaign—specifically posters produced by the political party Moravané—became controversial because of what critics described as a radical and xenophobic tone.

=== Genetic differences ===
During an international study involving participants from the Czech Republic, researchers found that the genetic makeup of Europeans is related to their place of origin. As part of the study, researchers separately analyzed samples from people originating from Bohemia and Moravia. Regarding differences among smaller ethnic groups, the study found minor genetic differences between Czech citizens whose ancestry originated in Bohemia and those whose ancestry originated in Moravia. Researchers suggested that these differences may be explained by the distinct historical origins of the populations of Bohemia and Moravia, combined with the traditionally sedentary lifestyle of their ancestors, since most of the population in earlier centuries was closely tied to the land and moved relatively little.

== See also ==
- List of Moravians
- Old Salem
