= Ondřej Přikryl =

Czech poet, pharmacist and politician

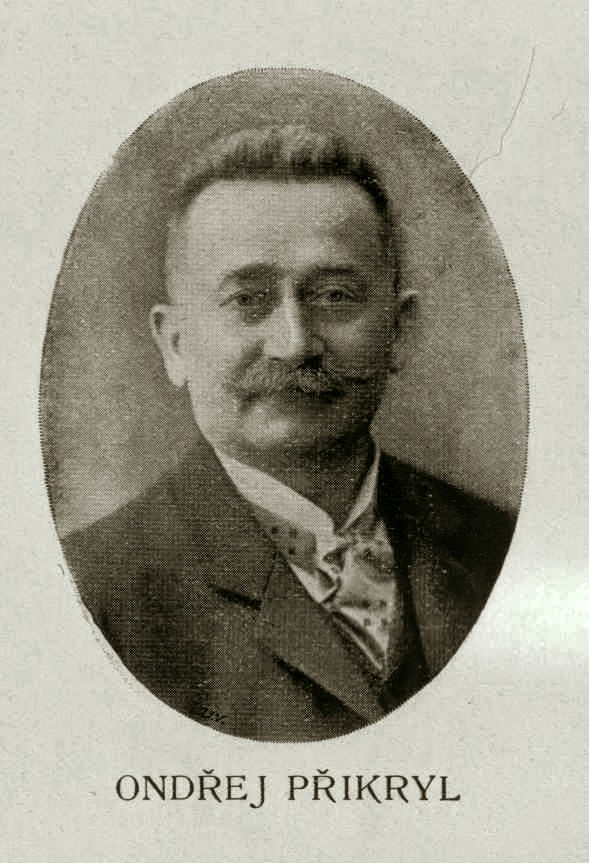

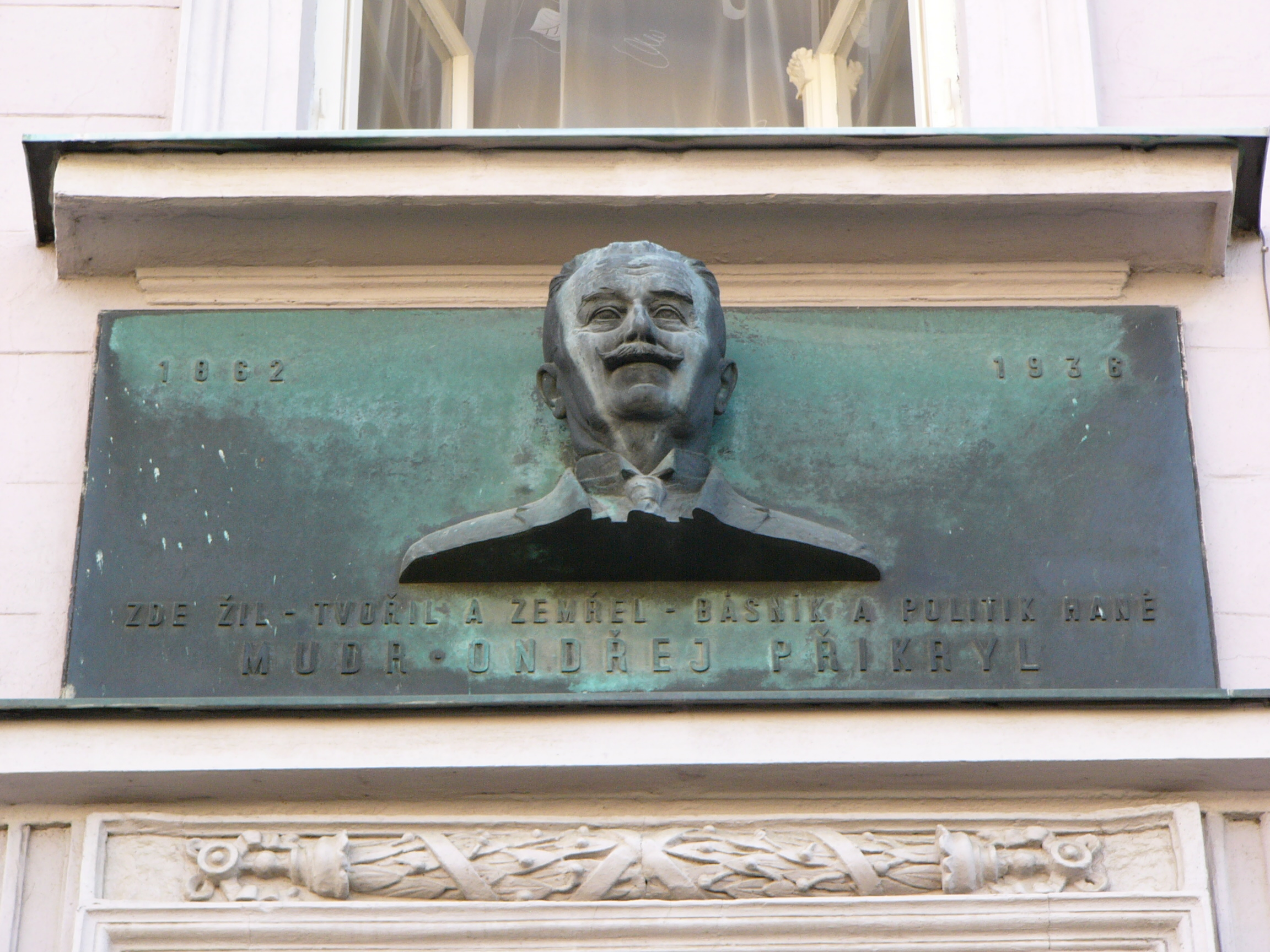
Plaque and bust of Přikryl at Žižkovo náměstí, Prostějov

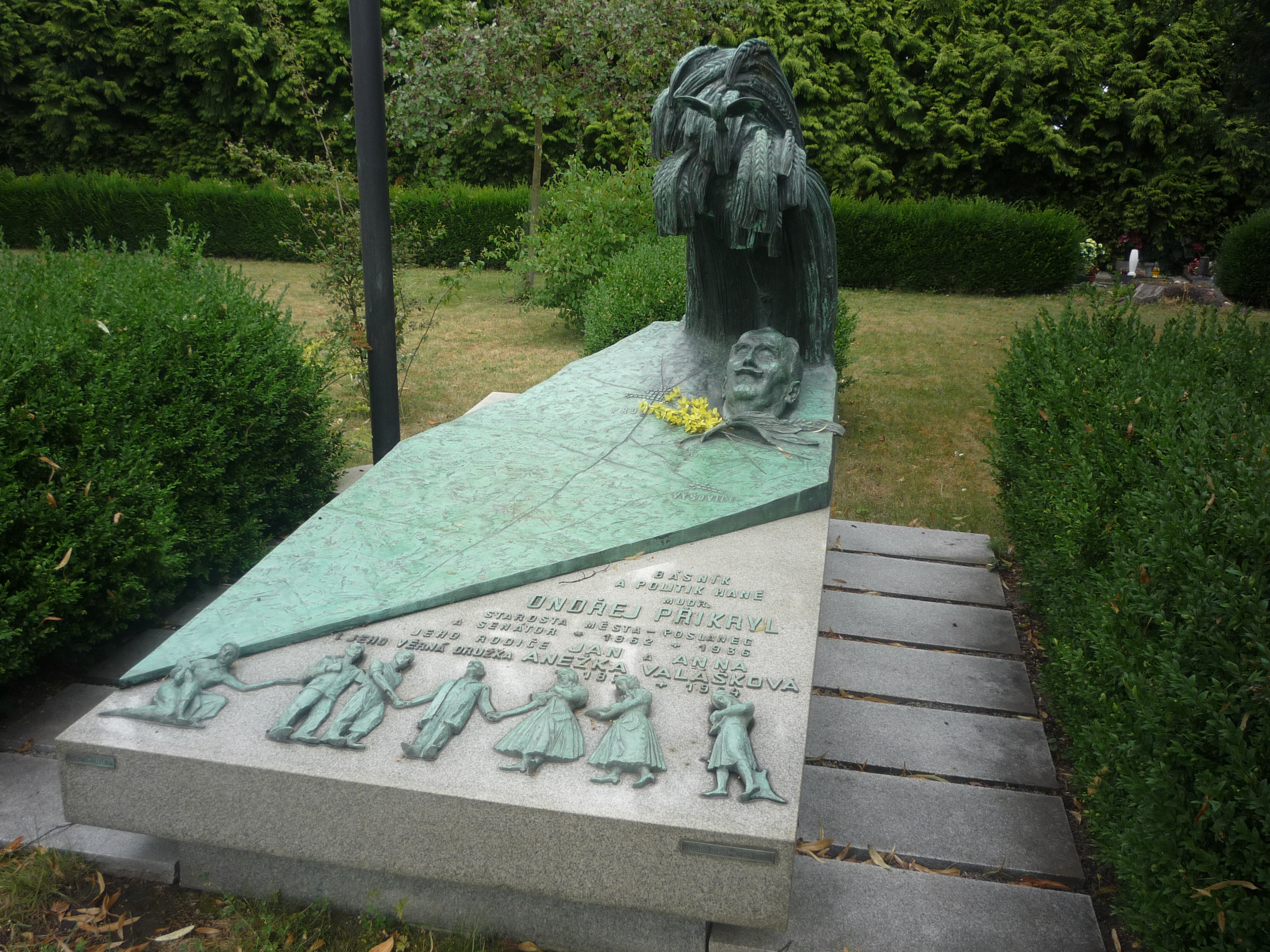
Gravesite

Ondřej Přikryl (26 November 1862 – 21 December 1936) was a Czech poet, pharmacist and politician.

== Life ==
Přikryl was born on 26 November 1862 in Výšovice, Moravia, Austrian Empire. He studied medicine at the Charles University in Prague, graduating in 1886. His professional career was in pharmacy but was also devoted politics and literature, eventually having political careers under two regimes and even gaining niche literary fame. Between 1914 and 1919, he served as the mayor of Prostějov, and in 1902, 1906 and 1913 he was elected to the Moravian Diet of the then Austro–Hungarian Empire. After World War I, he was elected to senate of the First Czechoslovak Republic in the 1920 elections, a position which he held until 1925. Přikryl's literary contribution was in the Hanakian dialect, in which he composed numerous poems and feuilletons.

Přikryl died on 21 December 1936 in Prostějov.

== Works ==
- Hanácky pěsničke (1900)
- Ešče z Hané (1912)
- Padesátka z Hané (1912)
- Haná a Romža (1914)
- Chabašči (1915)
- Z vojne (1917)
- Čase tvrči než ocel (1921)
- Rozmaryn (1922)
- Prostějovsky pěsničke (1927)
- Bévávalo
- Z těžkých dob Prostějova (1929–1930)
- Červánky Prostějova (1931)
- Mhla (1933)
- Pruchod do pekel (1935)
- K ževoto (1935)
- Před chropeňském zámkem (1936)
