= Vlčnov =

- Municipality
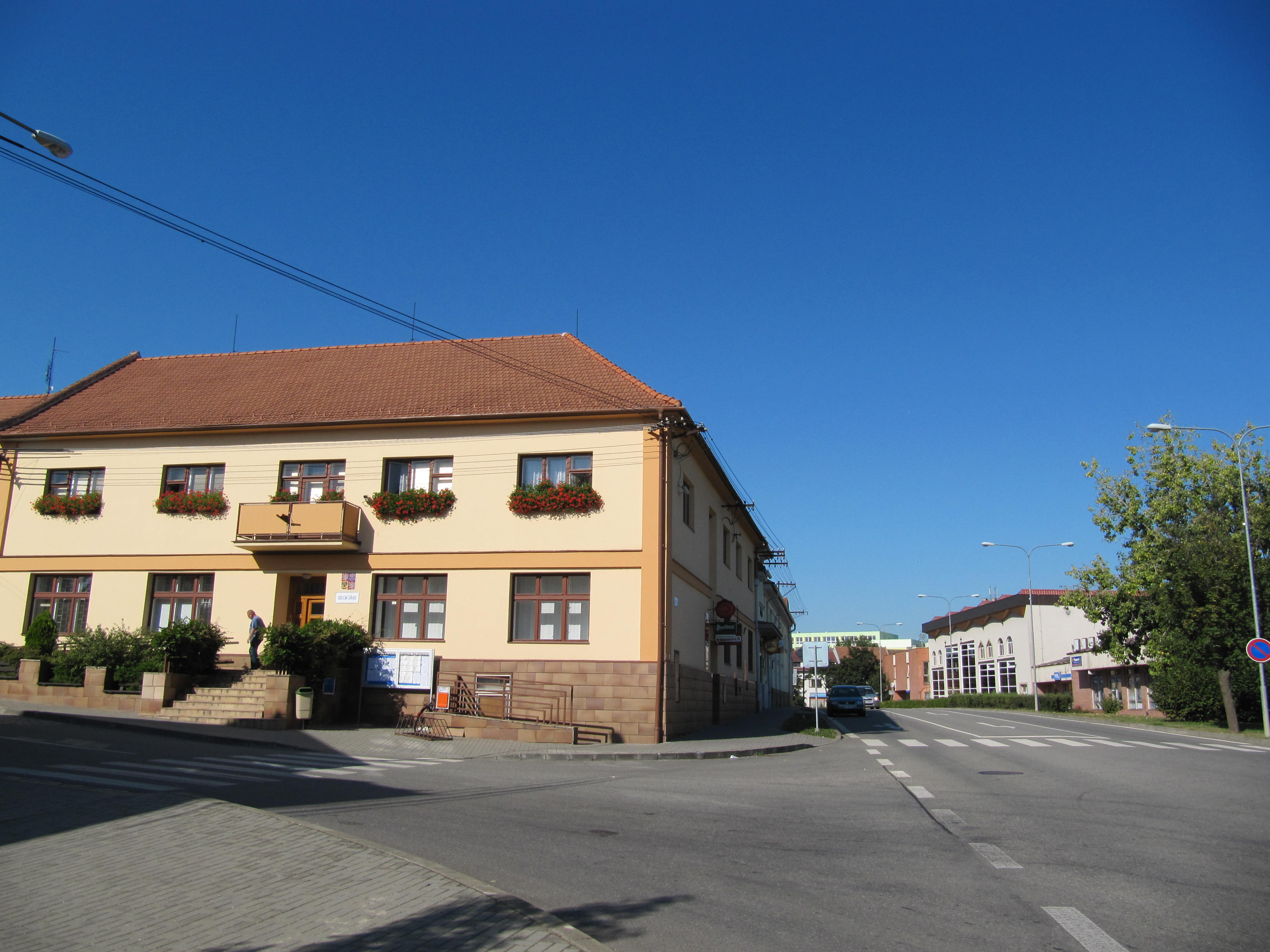
- Municipal office

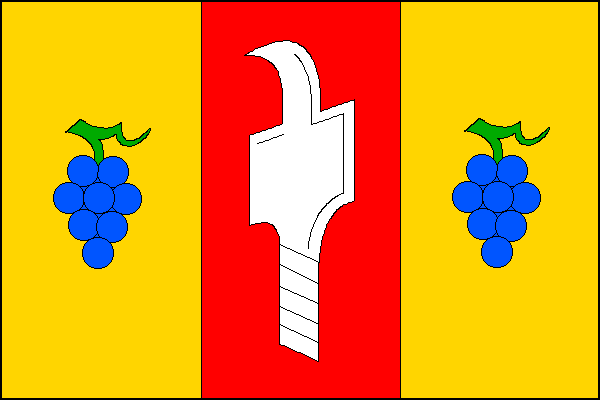
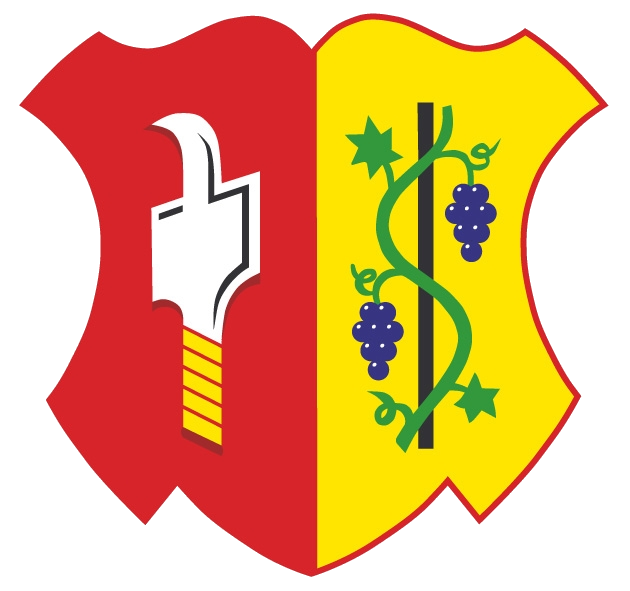
- Flag Coat of arms

- Location in the Czech Republic
- Coordinates: 49°0′36″N 17°34′55″E
- Country: Czech Republic
- Region: Zlín
- District: Uherské Hradiště
- First mentioned: 1264

Area
  - Total: 21.30 km^{2} (8.22 sq mi)
- Elevation: 226 m (741 ft)

Population (2026-01-01)
  - Total: 2,936
  - Density: 137.8/km^{2} (357.0/sq mi)
- Time zone: UTC+1 (CET)
  - Summer (DST): UTC+2 (CEST)
- Postal code: 687 61
- Website: www.vlcnov.cz

Vlčnov (Czech pronunciation: [ˈvltʃnof]) is a municipality and village in Uherské Hradiště District in the Zlín Region of the Czech Republic. It has about 2,900 inhabitants. The municipality is located in the Vizovice Highlands.

Vlčnov is known for viticulture and for the folklore festival Ride of the Kings, which is on the UNESCO Intangible Cultural Heritage List.

== Geography ==
Vlčnov is located about 10 kilometres (6 mi) southeast of Uherské Hradiště and 25 km (16 mi) south of Zlín. It lies in the Vizovice Highlands. The highest point is the hill Černá hora at 364 m (1,194 ft) above sea level. The stream Vlčnovský potok originates here and flows through the municipality.

== History ==
The first written mention of Vlčnov is from 1264. From 1506, it was part of the Uherský Brod estate. The estate with Vlčnov was owned by the Lords of Kunovice and from 1611 by the Kaunitz family.

== Demographics ==
Historical population

| Year | Pop. | ±% |
|---|---|---|
| 1869 | 1,405 | — |
| 1880 | 1,650 | +17.4% |
| 1890 | 1,876 | +13.7% |
| 1900 | 2,188 | +16.6% |
| 1910 | 2,447 | +11.8% |

| Year | Pop. | ±% |
|---|---|---|
| 1921 | 2,529 | +3.4% |
| 1930 | 2,789 | +10.3% |
| 1950 | 3,002 | +7.6% |
| 1961 | 3,473 | +15.7% |
| 1970 | 3,414 | −1.7% |

| Year | Pop. | ±% |
|---|---|---|
| 1980 | 3,276 | −4.0% |
| 1991 | 3,108 | −5.1% |
| 2001 | 3,030 | −2.5% |
| 2011 | 2,961 | −2.3% |
| 2021 | 2,810 | −5.1% |

Source: Censuses

== Economy ==
Vlčnov is known for viticulture and winemaking. The municipality lies in the Slovácká wine subregion.

== Transport ==
There are no railways or major roads passing through the municipality.

== Culture ==
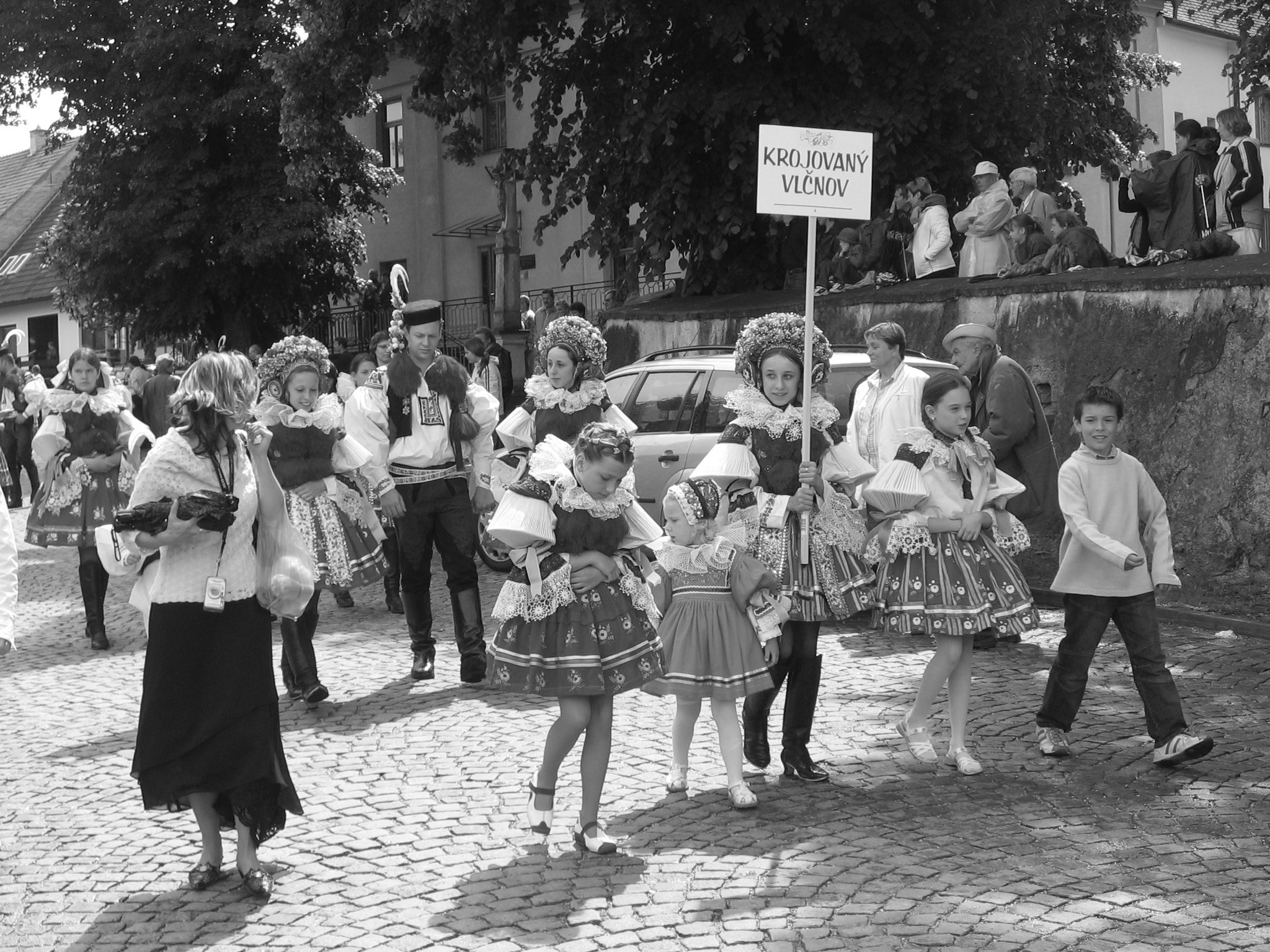
Procession during the Ride of the Kings

Vlčnov lies in the ethnographic region of Moravian Slovakia. The municipality is known for its folklore festival Ride of the Kings, which is on the UNESCO Intangible Cultural Heritage List. Its uninterrupted tradition dates back to 1808. It is held every year at the end of May. The festival is known outside the Czech Republic for its traditional costumes and folklore music.

== Sights ==
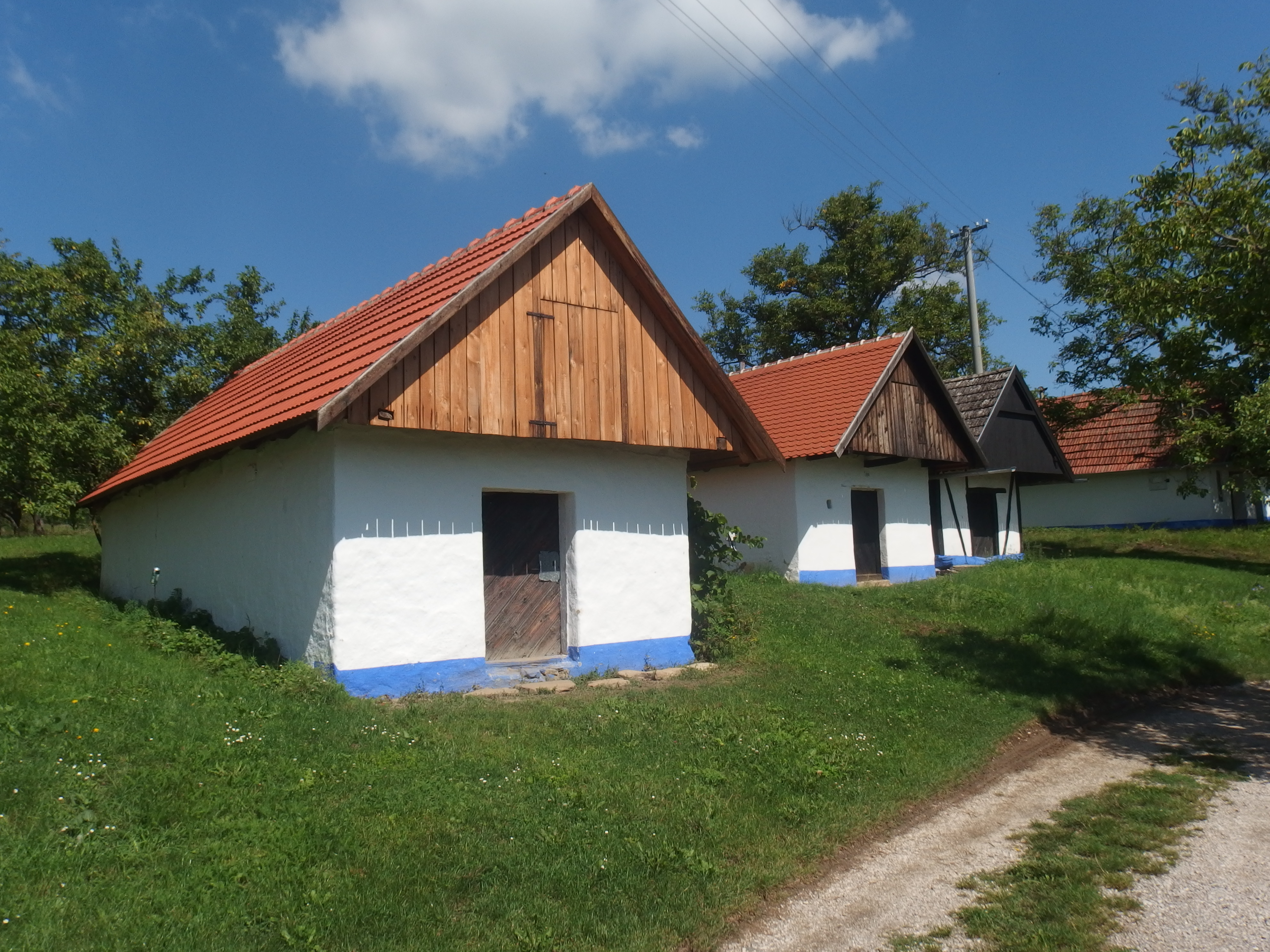
Búdy in Vlčnov

Northern part of Vlčnov called Kojiny is known for the vineyard buildings of folk architecture – búdy, which are above-ground cellars and presses. Vlčnov-Kojiny is protected as a village monument reservation.

The main landmark of Vlčnov is the Church of Saint James the Great. It is an early Gothic building from the 13th century.

Vlčnov is also known for Home Distillery Museum. It was opened in 2010 and is managed by the Museum of Moravian Slovakia in Uherské Hradiště.
