= Výšovice =

- Municipality
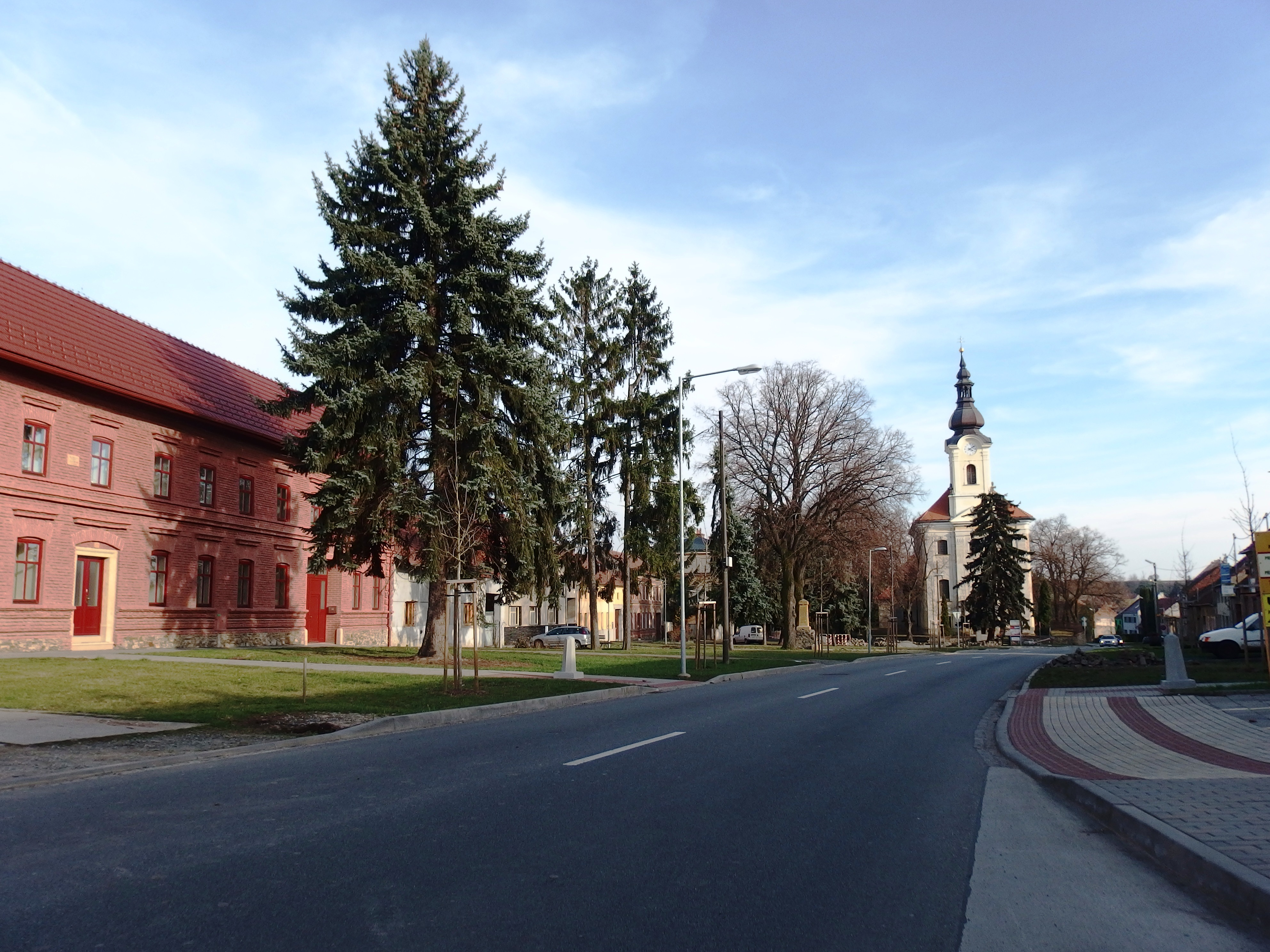
- Centre of Výšovice

- Flag Coat of arms

- Location in the Czech Republic
- Coordinates: 49°24′59″N 17°8′21″E
- Country: Czech Republic
- Region: Olomouc
- District: Prostějov
- First mentioned: 1348

Area
  - Total: 5.93 km^{2} (2.29 sq mi)
- Elevation: 224 m (735 ft)

Population (2026-01-01)
  - Total: 630
  - Density: 110/km^{2} (280/sq mi)
- Time zone: UTC+1 (CET)
  - Summer (DST): UTC+2 (CEST)
- Postal code: 798 09
- Website: www.vysovice.cz

Výšovice is a municipality and village in Prostějov District in the Olomouc Region of the Czech Republic. It has about 600 inhabitants.

Výšovice lies approximately 8 kilometres (5 mi) south of Prostějov, 22 km (14 mi) south of Olomouc, and 210 km (130 mi) east of Prague.

== History ==
The first written mention of Výšovice is from 1348.

== Demographics ==
Historical population
Year	Pop.	±%
1869	516	—
1880	548	+6.2%
1890	591	+7.8%
1900	607	+2.7%
1910	687	+13.2%
1921	702	+2.2%
1930	716	+2.0%
1950	579	−19.1%
1961	621	+7.3%
1970	564	−9.2%
1980	530	−6.0%
1991	410	−22.6%
2001	424	+3.4%
2011	463	+9.2%
2021	503	+8.6%
Source: Censuses

== Notable people ==
- Ondřej Přikryl (1862–1936), writer and politician
