= Ride of the Kings =

Pentecost festival in the Czech Republic

Ride of the Kings Jízda králů
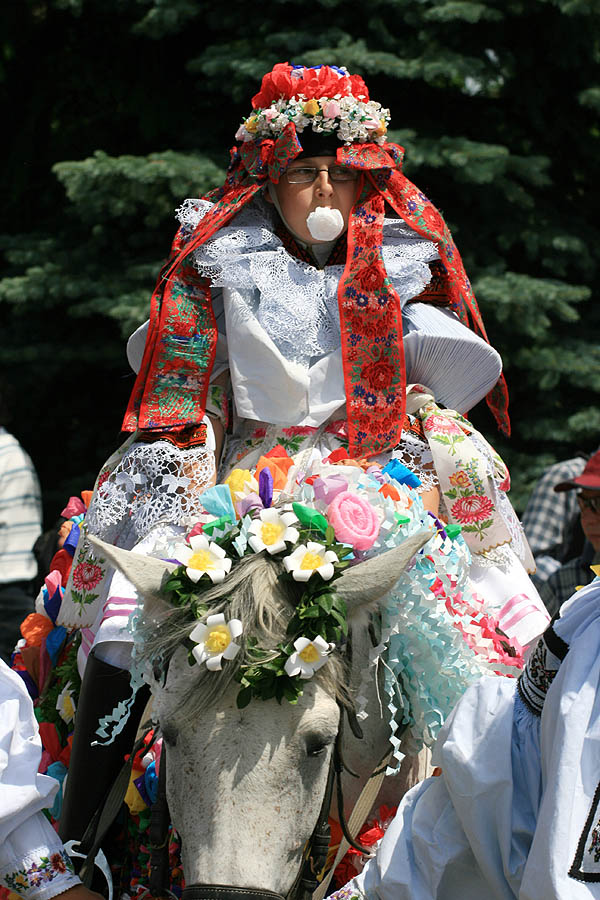
- A young boy (the "King") in traditional costume with a rose in his mouth at the Ride of Kings in Vlčnov (2007)
- Date: Pentecost
- Locations: Moravia, Czech Republic

Ride of the Kings in the south-east of the Czech Republic
- UNESCO Intangible Cultural Heritage
- Country: Czech Republic
- Reference: 00564
- Region: Europe and North America

Inscription history
- Inscription: 2011 (6th session)
- List: Representative

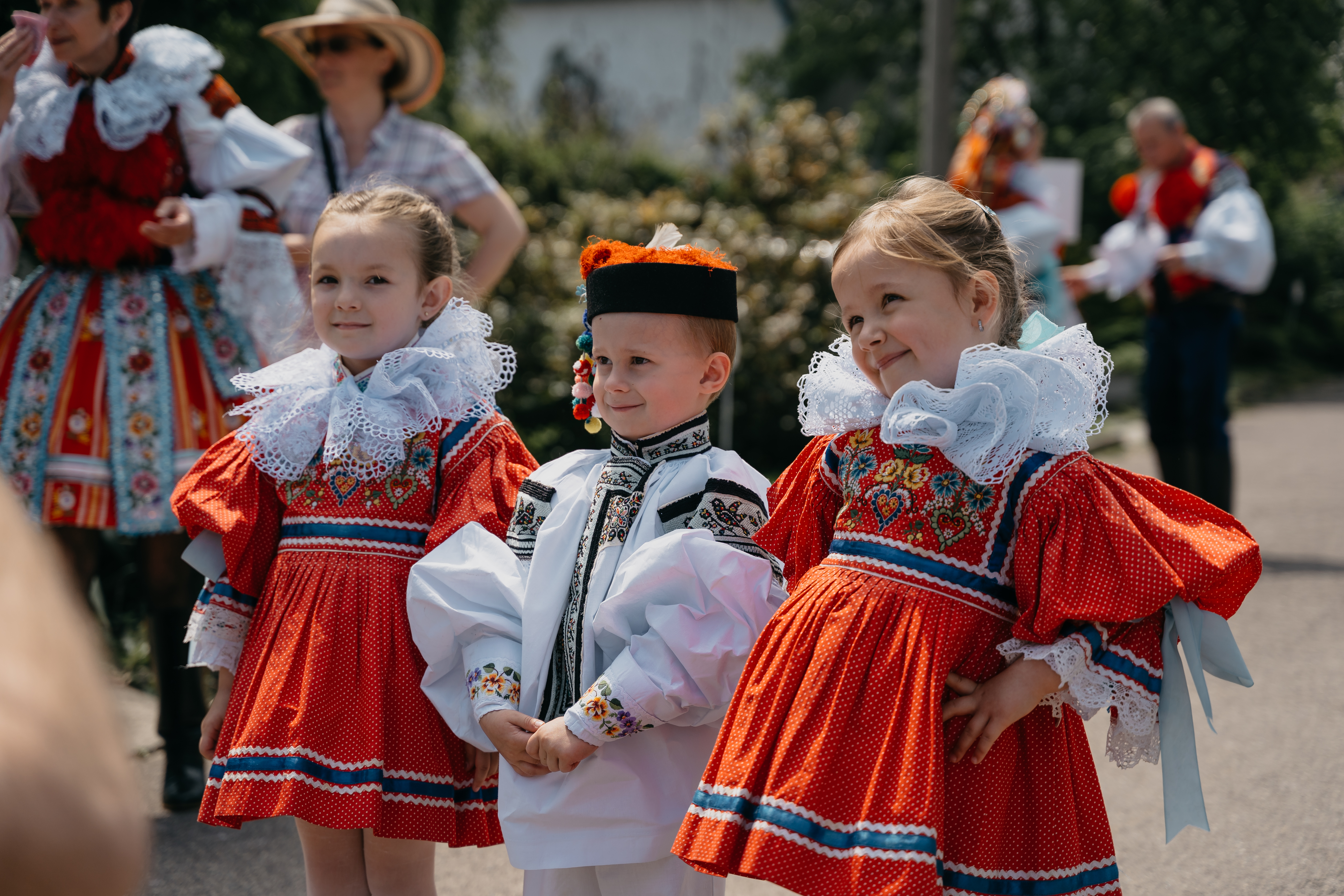
Kids enjoying the festival Jízda králů ("Ride of Kings") in Vlčnov

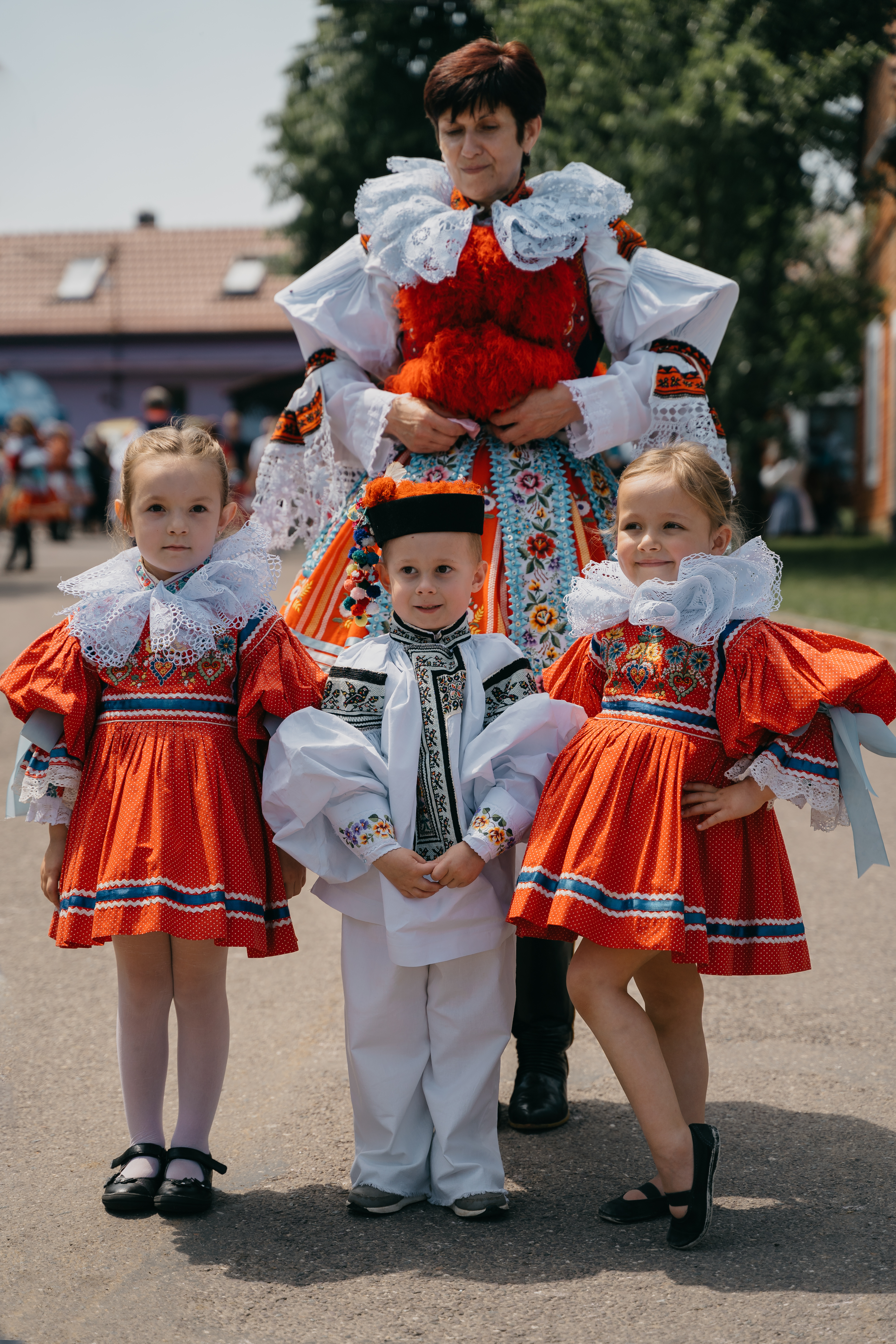
Kids enjoying the festival Jízda králů in Vlčnov

The Ride of the Kings (Czech: Jízda králů) is a festival that is celebrated in Spring, at the Pentecost, in Moravia, the south-east of the Czech Republic. In 2011, UNESCO included it in the Representative List of the Intangible Cultural Heritage of Humanity.

The festival takes place in the region historically known as Moravian Slovakia. It is celebrated annually in the village of Vlčnov (pop.3,000), every three years in Hluk (pop.4,400), every two years in Kunovice (pop.5,500), and occasionally in Skoronice (pop.550) as part of another festival called the "Slovácký rok" (Slovak Year).

In other parts of Moravia they have similar traditions, such as "Honění krála" (Hunt of King) in Haná and Czech Silesia or "Vožení krála" (Driving of King) in the region south of Brno. They too are traditionally held on Pentecost, but nowadays are held only exceptionally.

== Description ==
Until World War II, the Ride was an integral part of the Feast of Pentecost, but has since become largely a social event. The ceremony begins with a religious service and the approval of the Mayor, followed by the preparation of the costumes and decorations for the horses and riders. These are made by the women of the villages, according to traditional colors and designs unique to each place.

The Ride itself is performed by young men who number between 15 and 25. They are preceded and followed by singers and an honor guard wearing unsheathed swords to protect the "King"; a young boy of 10 to 15 years old, whose face is partially covered, holding a rose in his mouth. The King and his groomsmen are dressed in feminine costumes, while all the other riders wear masculine clothing. After riding through the village for a few hours, sometimes exchanging witticisms with the crowd, the participants return home then, later in the evening, meet at the "King's House" for music and dancing.

== Origins ==
It has been celebrated in largely its current form since 1808, but its origins are unclear. A possible source are the Easter processions which, themselves, date from pagan ceremonies to ensure a good harvest. There are also similarities to initiation ceremonies for young men in Kyrgyzstan. In the Czech Republic, it is associated with various tales from history, including one that involves Matthias Corvinus dressing as a woman to flee from a disastrous battle, and myths such as the search for the "King of Barley" in Haná.

== In fiction ==
The Ride of the Kings is a subject of the novel Žert (The Joke) by the Czech-French writer Milan Kundera (part 4, Jaroslav).
