= Moravian Slovakia =

Cultural region in the Czech Republic

Coordinates: 49°0′N 17°23′E

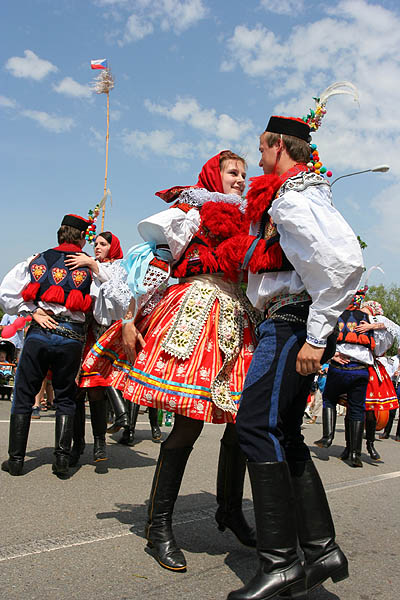
Traditional costumes worn during the Ride of the Kings Festival in Vlčnov

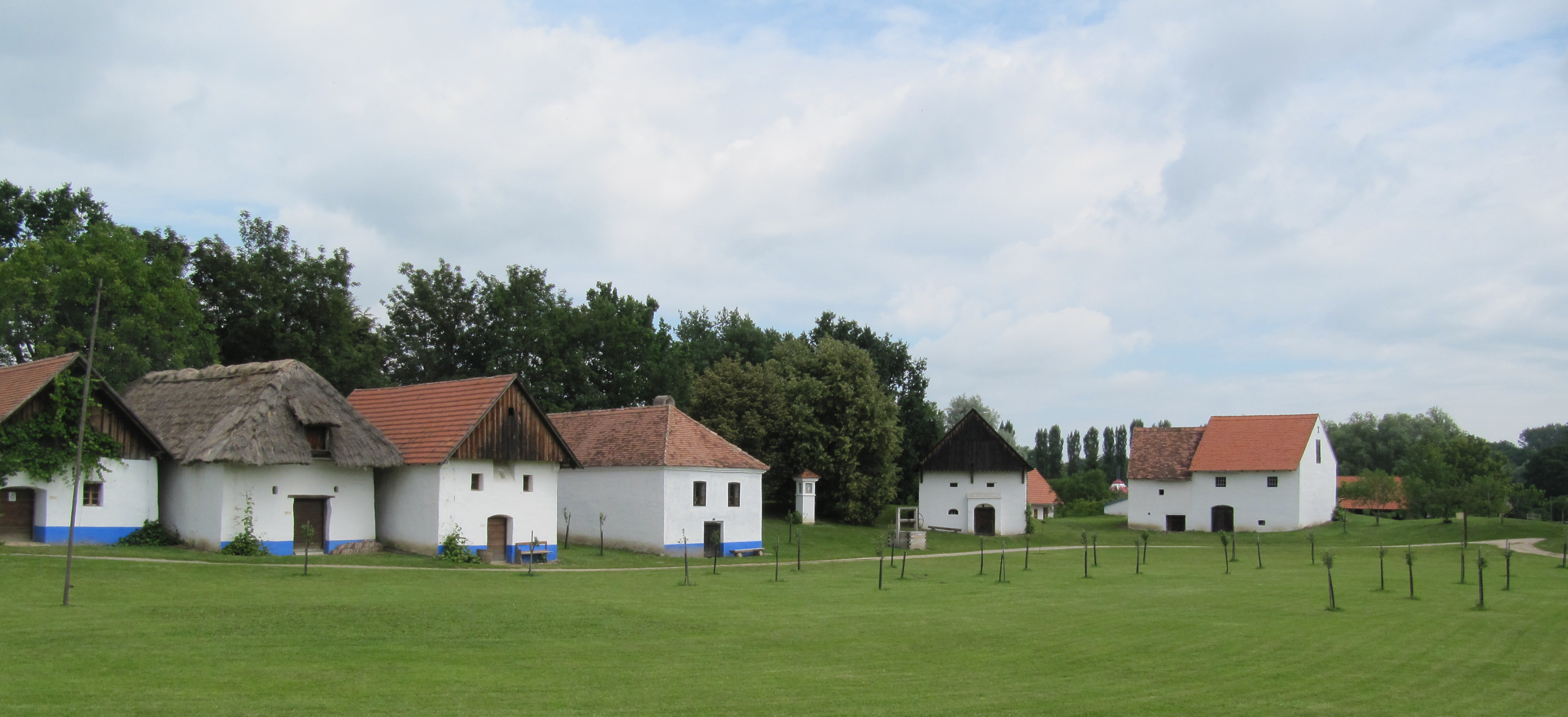
Vernacular architecture of Moravian Slovakia in Strážnice open-air museum

Moravian Slovakia, also called Slovácko (Czech: Slovácko, older Moravské Slovensko) is a cultural region in the southeastern part of the Czech Republic. It lies in the historical region of Moravia, on the border with Slovakia (the Slovak region of Záhorie) and Austria. It is known for its characteristic folklore, music, wine, costumes and traditions. The area forms part of both the Zlín and South Moravian administrative regions.

Its main centre is the town of Uherské Hradiště which is located on the Morava River. Other important towns include Uherský Brod, Břeclav, Hodonín, Strážnice, Dubňany and Kyjov. In the 9th century the region of Moravian Slovakia was the centre of the Great Moravian empire.

== Subregions ==
Moravian Slovakia is divided into six subregions: Dolňácko, Horňácko, Podluží, Moravské Kopanice, Hanácké Slovácko and Luhačovické zálesí.

== Economy ==
Moravian Slovakia is noted for its viticulture.

== Language ==
Natives of this region speak the Eastern Moravian dialects of the Czech language, which are transitional dialects between Czech and Slovak. Due to these cultural and linguistic links to Slovakia, many ethnographers until the 20th century used to consider Moravian Slovaks as a people which politically belonged to Moravia and the Bohemian Crown but ethnographically and culturally to the Slovak ethnic group. Historically, there were also significant numbers of German speakers who also influenced local speech.

== Sport ==
Since 2004, the football club from Uherské Hradiště is named 1. FC Slovácko and is rare example of a Czech club holding the name of its home region and not of its home city or town.

== Notable people ==
- Tomáš Garrigue Masaryk, philosopher, president of Czechoslovakia
- Jan Černý, president of Moravia, PM of Czechoslovakia
- John Amos Comenius, philosopher, founder of modern education
- František Peřina, general, RAF ace
- Václav Nedomanský, Hall of Fame ice hockey player
