= Zlín agglomeration =

Area in the Czech Republic

Zlín agglomeration Zlínská aglomerace
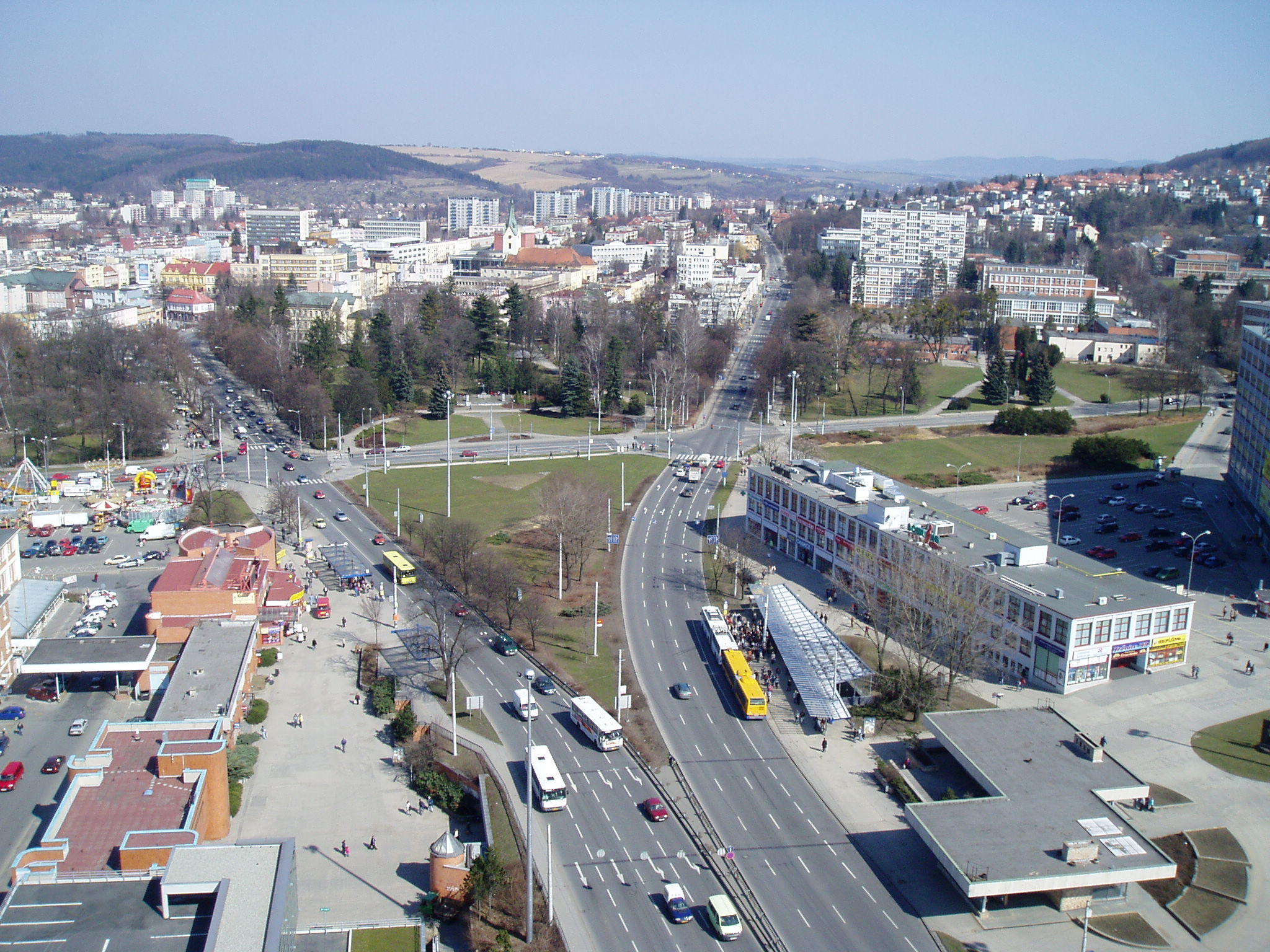
- View of Zlín
- Country: Czech Republic
- Region: Zlín
- Largest city: Zlín

Area
  - Total: 439 km^{2} (169 sq mi)

Population (2024)
  - Total: 130,335
  - Density: 297/km^{2} (769/sq mi)
- Time zone: UTC+1 (CET)
  - Summer (DST): UTC+2 (CEST)

The Zlín agglomeration (Czech: Zlínská aglomerace) is the agglomeration of the city of Zlín and its surroundings in the Czech Republic. It was defined in 2020 as a tool for drawing money from the European Structural and Investment Funds and is valid in 2021–2027. The agglomeration has a population of about 130,000 and also includes the town of Otrokovice.

== Definition ==
The Zlín agglomeration was first defined in 2014 by the Ministry of Regional Development of the Czech Republic for the purposes of the Integrated Land Development Plans, which was a tool for drawing money from the European Structural and Investment Funds. The agglomeration comprised 11 municipalities with about 107,000 inhabitants and had an area of 213 km^{2} (82 sq mi).

The current Zlín agglomeration was defined in 2020 by the Ministry of Regional Development for the purposes of the so-called Integrated Territorial Investment (ITI), which is a newer tool for drawing money from the European Structural and Investment Funds.

The territory was defined on the basis of a coefficient composed of three methods: integrated system of centres (i.e. delineation of commuting flows based on mobile operator data from 2019), time spent in core cities (based on mobile operator data from 2019) and residential suburbanization zones (based on statistics of realized housing construction and directional migration from the core of the agglomeration to suburban municipalities in the period 2009–2016). The scope of the territory is valid for the period 2021–2027.

== Municipalities ==
The agglomeration includes 36 municipalities.

Name	Population (2024)
Bohuslavice u Zlína	741
Březnice	1,467
Březová	506
Březůvky	775
Dešná	205
Držková	371
Fryšták	3,843
Hostišová	563
Hrobice	464
Hvozdná	1,312
Kašava	1,005
Lhota	912
Lípa	857
Lukov	1,807
Lukoveček	463
Lutonina	424
Machová	691
Mysločovice	718
Neubuz	450
Ostrata	429
Otrokovice	17,597
Pohořelice	902
Provodov	784
Racková	835
Šarovy	250
Sazovice	912
Slušovice	2,961
Tečovice	1,477
Tlumačov	2,460
Veselá	839
Vizovice	4,886
Vlčková	415
Zádveřice-Raková	1,547
Želechovice nad Dřevnicí	1,873
Zlámanec	339
Zlín	74,255
Total	130,335
