= Dřevnice =

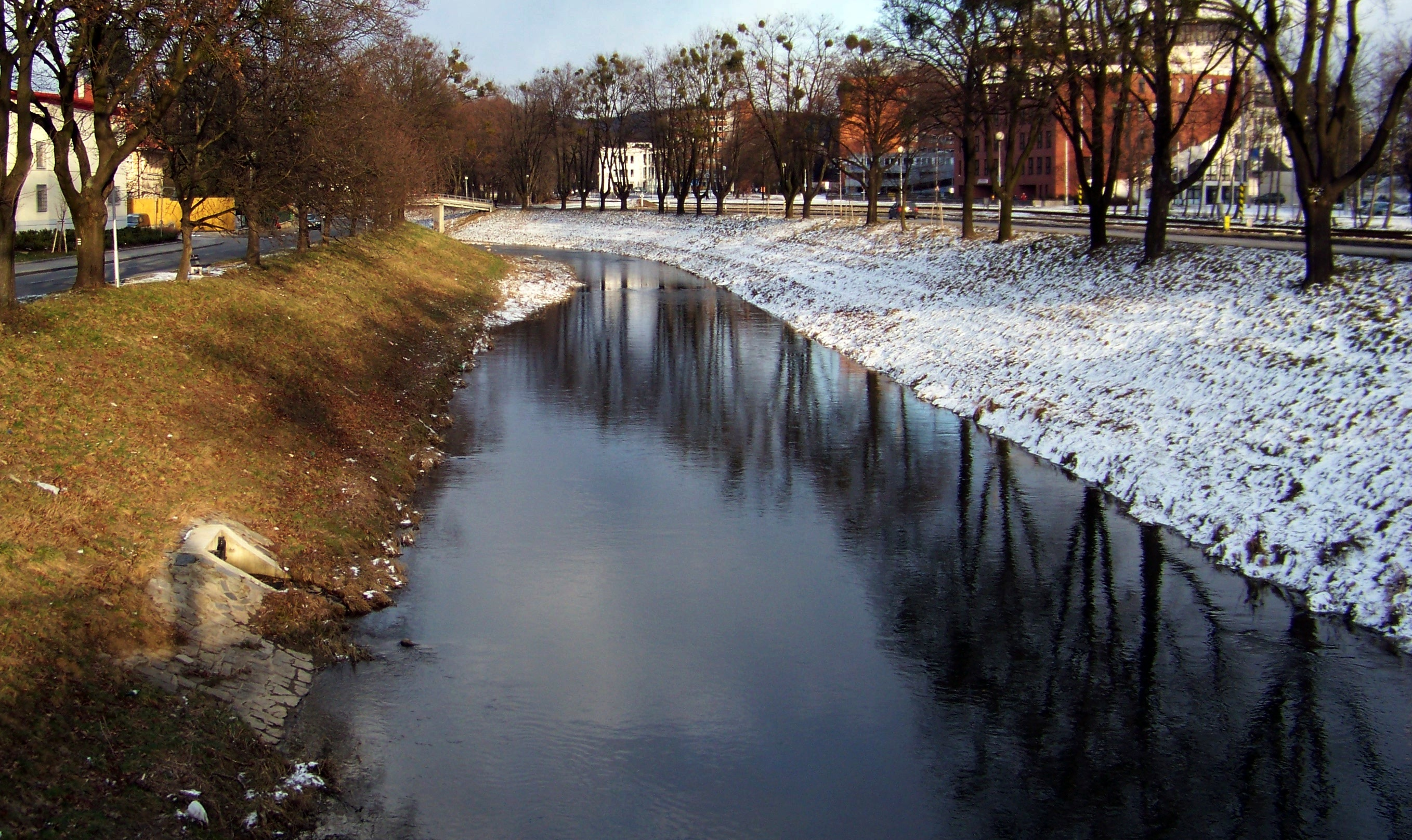
- The Dřevnice in Zlín

Location
- Country: Czech Republic
- Region: Zlín

Physical characteristics
- Source
  - location: Držková, Vizovice Highlands
  - coordinates: 49°20′52″N 17°48′18″E
  - elevation: 568 m (1,864 ft)
- Mouth
  - location: Morava
  - coordinates: 49°12′12″N 17°30′41″E
  - elevation: 177 m (581 ft)
- Length: 41.6 km (25.8 mi)
- Basin size: 435.2 km^{2} (168.0 sq mi)
- Discharge
  - average: 3.15 m^{3}/s (111 cu ft/s) near estuary

Basin features
- Progression: Morava→ Danube→ Black Sea

The Dřevnice is a river in the Czech Republic, a left tributary of the Morava River. It flows through the Zlín Region. It is 41.6 km (25.8 mi) long.

== Etymology ==
The name of the river has its root in the Czech word dřevo (i.e. 'wood'). The name is derived from the wooden stakes and boards that were used to strengthen the banks of the river in populated areas as protection against floods.

== Characteristic ==
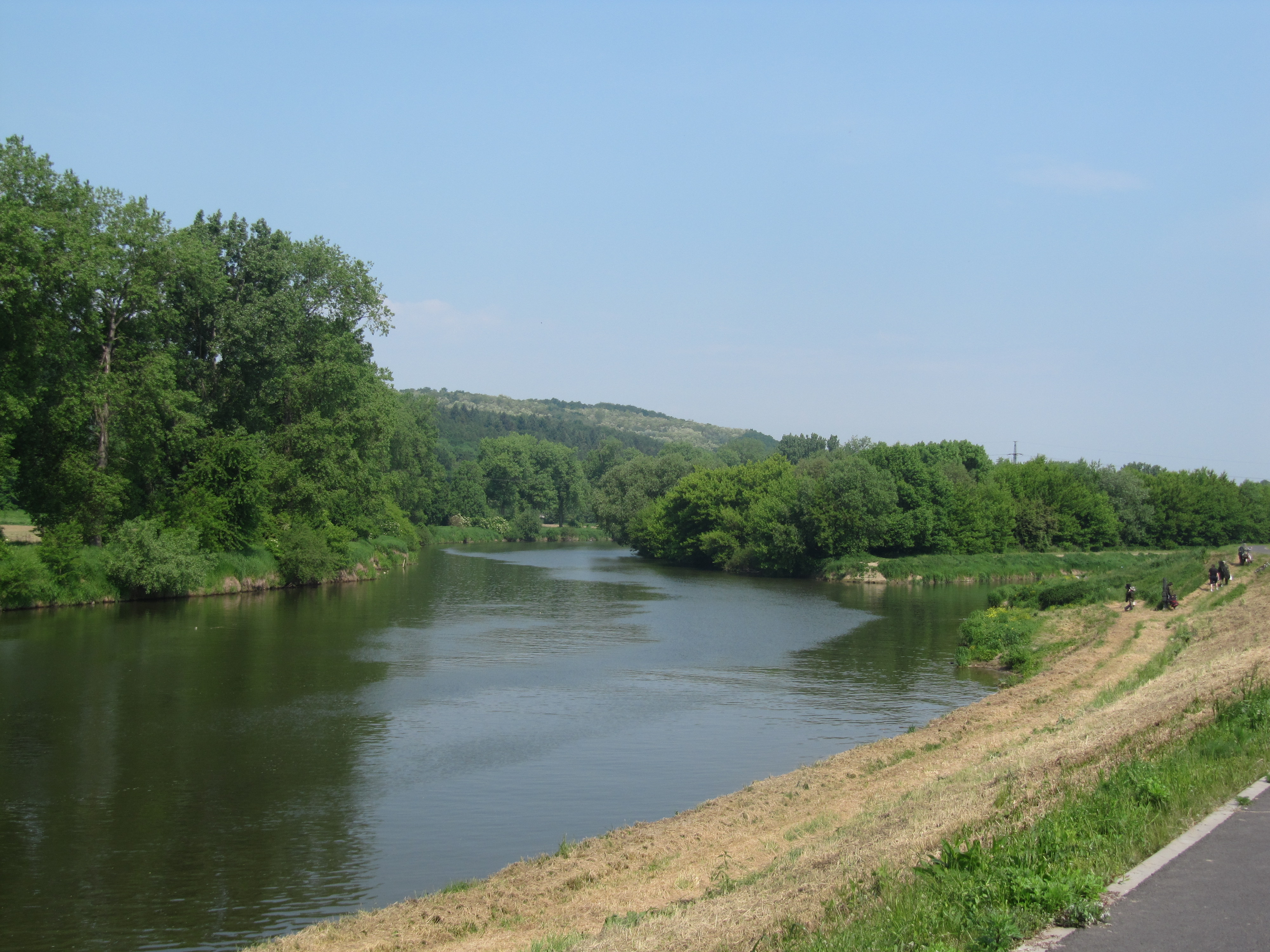
Confluence of the Dřevnice (right) and Morava

The Dřevnice originates in the territory of Držková in the Vizovice Highlands at an elevation of 568 m (1,864 ft) and flows to Otrokovice, where it enters the Morava River at an elevation of 177 m (581 ft). It is 41.6 km (25.8 mi) long. Its drainage basin has an area of 435.2 km^{2} (168.0 sq mi).

The longest tributaries of the Dřevnice are:

Tributary	Length (km)	River km	Side
Lutoninka	15.6	22.0	left
Fryštácký potok	14.2	13.9	right
Racková	14.0	4.2	right
Trnávka	11.0	28.3	left
Všeminka	10.1	26.8	left
Obůrek	8.7	19.4	left

== Course ==
The most notable settlement on the river is the city of Zlín. The river flows through the municipal territories of Držková, Kašava, Hrobice, Trnava, Březová, Slušovice, Lípa, Želechovice nad Dřevnicí, Zlín and Otrokovice.

== Bodies of water ==
There are 142 bodies of water in the basin area. The Slušovice Reservoir is constructed on the river, and is the largest body of water in the drainage basin with an area of 75 ha (190 acres).

== Fauna ==
Naturally occurring fish in the river include river trout, common barbel, grayling and common nase.

== See also ==
- List of rivers of the Czech Republic
