= Želechovice nad Dřevnicí =

- Municipality
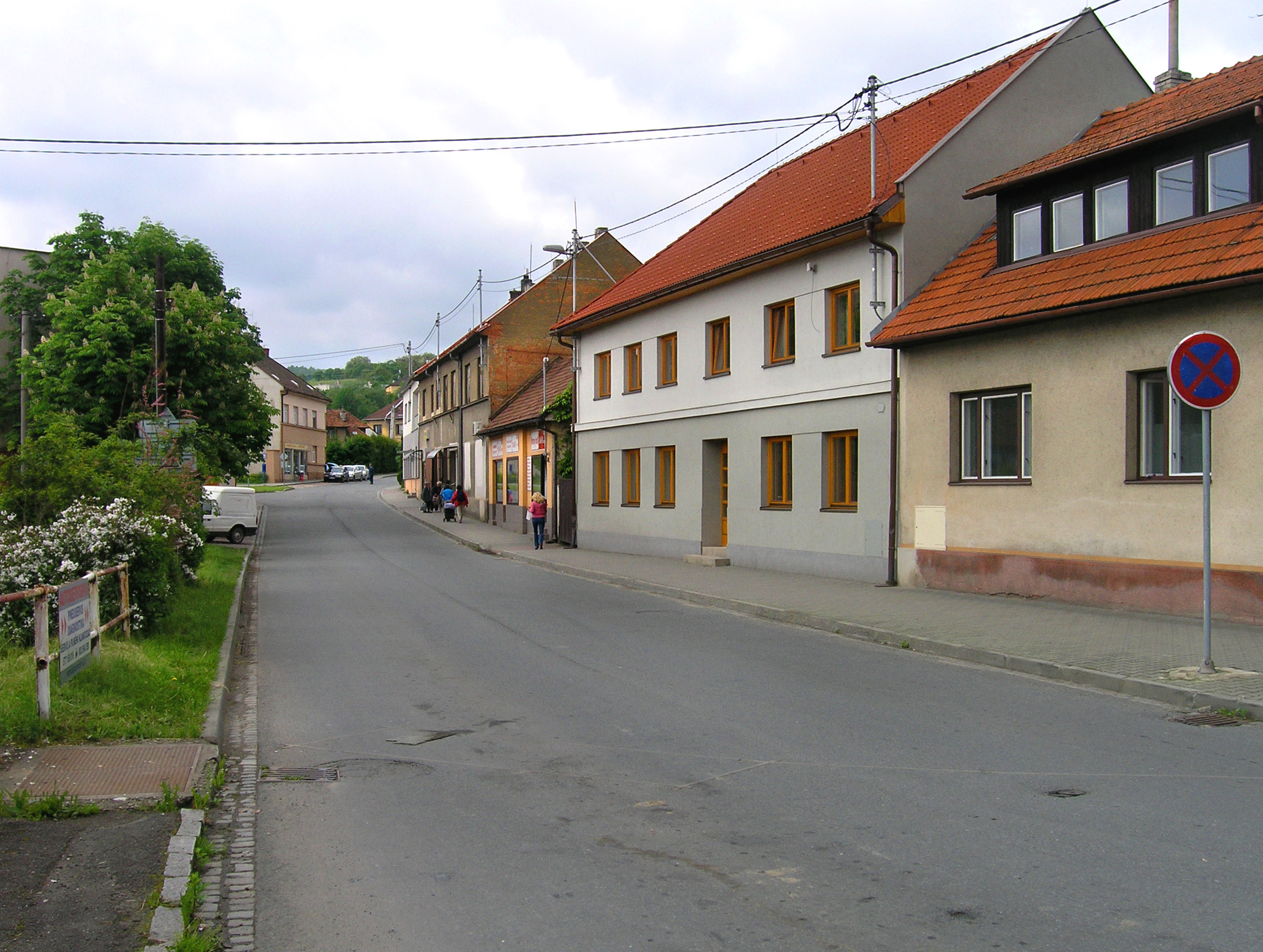
- Poddřevnická street

- Flag Coat of arms

- Location in the Czech Republic
- Coordinates: 49°13′5″N 17°44′51″E
- Country: Czech Republic
- Region: Zlín
- District: Zlín
- First mentioned: 1261

Area
  - Total: 16.03 km^{2} (6.19 sq mi)
- Elevation: 242 m (794 ft)

Population (2026-01-01)
  - Total: 1,897
  - Density: 118.3/km^{2} (306.5/sq mi)
- Time zone: UTC+1 (CET)
  - Summer (DST): UTC+2 (CEST)
- Postal code: 763 11
- Website: www.zelechovice.eu

Želechovice nad Dřevnicí is a municipality and village in Zlín District in the Zlín Region of the Czech Republic. It has about 1,900 inhabitants.

== Geography ==
Želechovice nad Dřevnicí is located about 5 kilometres (3 mi) east of Zlín. It lies in the Vizovice Highlands. The highest point is at 521 m (1,709 ft) above sea level. The municipality is situated on the left bank of the Dřevnice River, which forms the northern border of the municipal territory.

== History ==
The first written mention of Želechovice nad Dřevnicí is from 1261, when half of the village was owned by the newly established Smilheim monastery in Vizovice. The village was formed by two parts with different owners. The village was united only in 1848, when an independent municipality was established.

== Demographics ==
Historical population

| Year | Pop. | ±% |
|---|---|---|
| 1869 | 814 | — |
| 1880 | 907 | +11.4% |
| 1890 | 840 | −7.4% |
| 1900 | 880 | +4.8% |
| 1910 | 942 | +7.0% |

| Year | Pop. | ±% |
|---|---|---|
| 1921 | 982 | +4.2% |
| 1930 | 1,280 | +30.3% |
| 1950 | 1,658 | +29.5% |
| 1961 | 1,835 | +10.7% |
| 1970 | 1,816 | −1.0% |

| Year | Pop. | ±% |
|---|---|---|
| 1980 | 2,059 | +13.4% |
| 1991 | 1,980 | −3.8% |
| 2001 | 2,021 | +2.1% |
| 2011 | 1,911 | −5.4% |
| 2021 | 1,817 | −4.9% |

Source: Censuses

== Transport ==
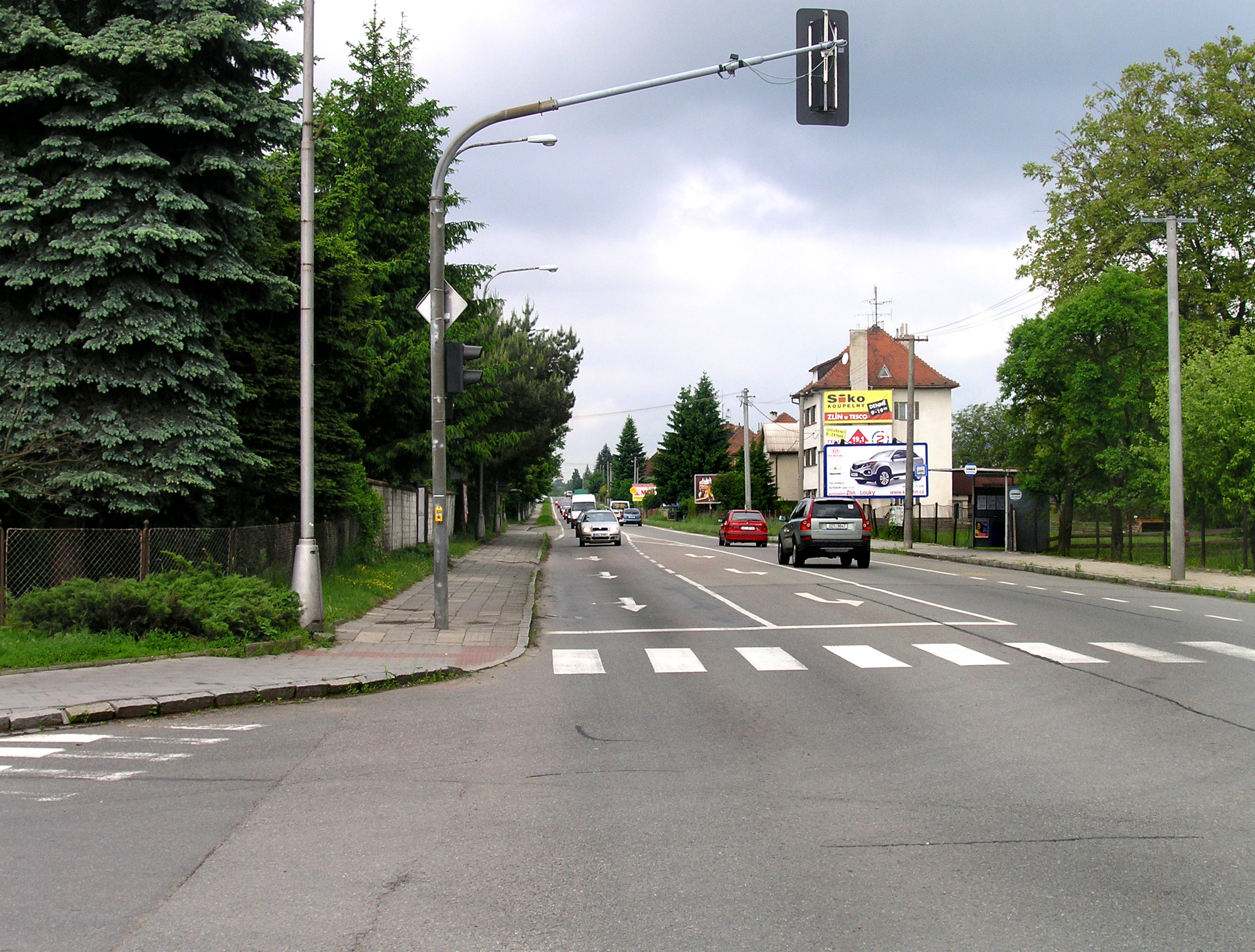
Main street

The I/49 road, which connects Zlín with the Czech–Slovak border in Střelná, runs through the municipality.

Želechovice nad Dřevnicí is located on the railway line of regional importance Otrokovice–Vizovice via Zlín.

The municipality is connected to local public transport network of Zlín and Otrokovice (provider Public transport company Zlín-Otrokovice) with trolleybus.

== Sights ==
The main landmark of the municipality is the Church of Saints Peter and Paul. It is a late Baroque building from the mid-18th century, which replaced an old Gothic church from the 13th century.
