= Mysločovice =

- Municipality
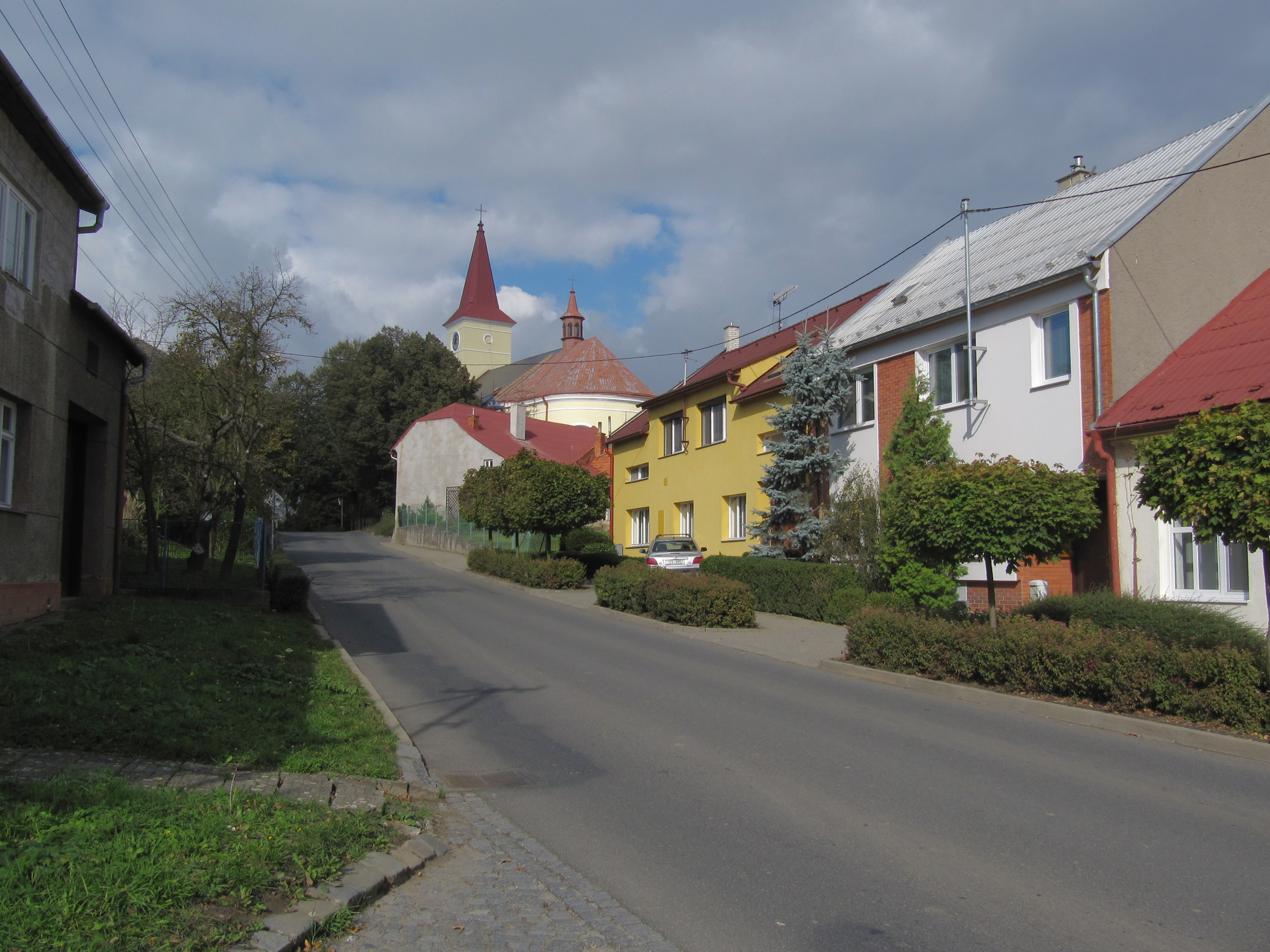
- Main street and Church of the Holy Trinity

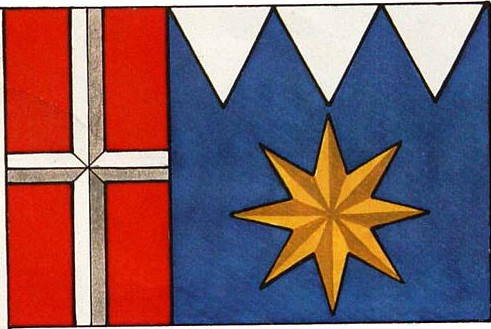
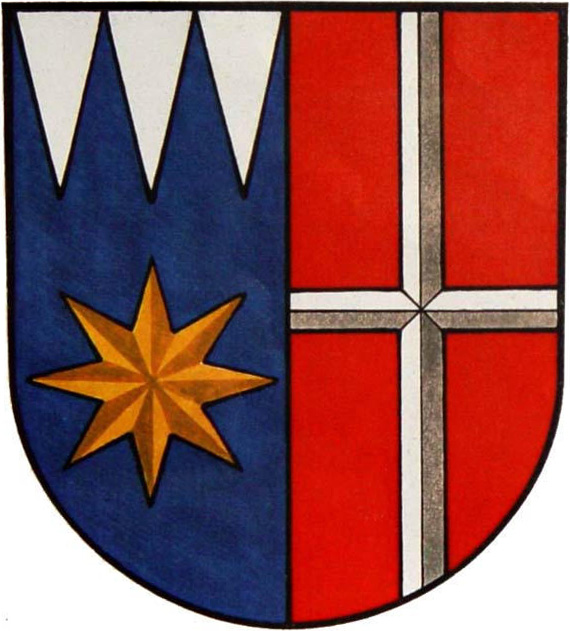
- Flag Coat of arms

- Location in the Czech Republic
- Coordinates: 49°15′22″N 17°33′58″E
- Country: Czech Republic
- Region: Zlín
- District: Zlín
- First mentioned: 1397

Area
  - Total: 3.59 km^{2} (1.39 sq mi)
- Elevation: 210 m (690 ft)

Population (2026-01-01)
  - Total: 716
  - Density: 199/km^{2} (517/sq mi)
- Time zone: UTC+1 (CET)
  - Summer (DST): UTC+2 (CEST)
- Postal code: 763 01
- Website: www.myslocovice.cz

Mysločovice is a municipality and village in Zlín District in the Zlín Region of the Czech Republic. It has about 700 inhabitants.

Mysločovice lies approximately 8 kilometres (5 mi) west of Zlín and 245 km (152 mi) east of Prague.

== Demographics ==
Historical population
Year	Pop.	±%
1869	370	—
1880	466	+25.9%
1890	504	+8.2%
1900	522	+3.6%
1910	574	+10.0%
1921	525	−8.5%
1930	532	+1.3%
1950	499	−6.2%
1961	571	+14.4%
1970	578	+1.2%
1980	634	+9.7%
1991	608	−4.1%
2001	578	−4.9%
2011	631	+9.2%
2021	676	+7.1%
Source: Censuses
