= Kašava =

- Municipality
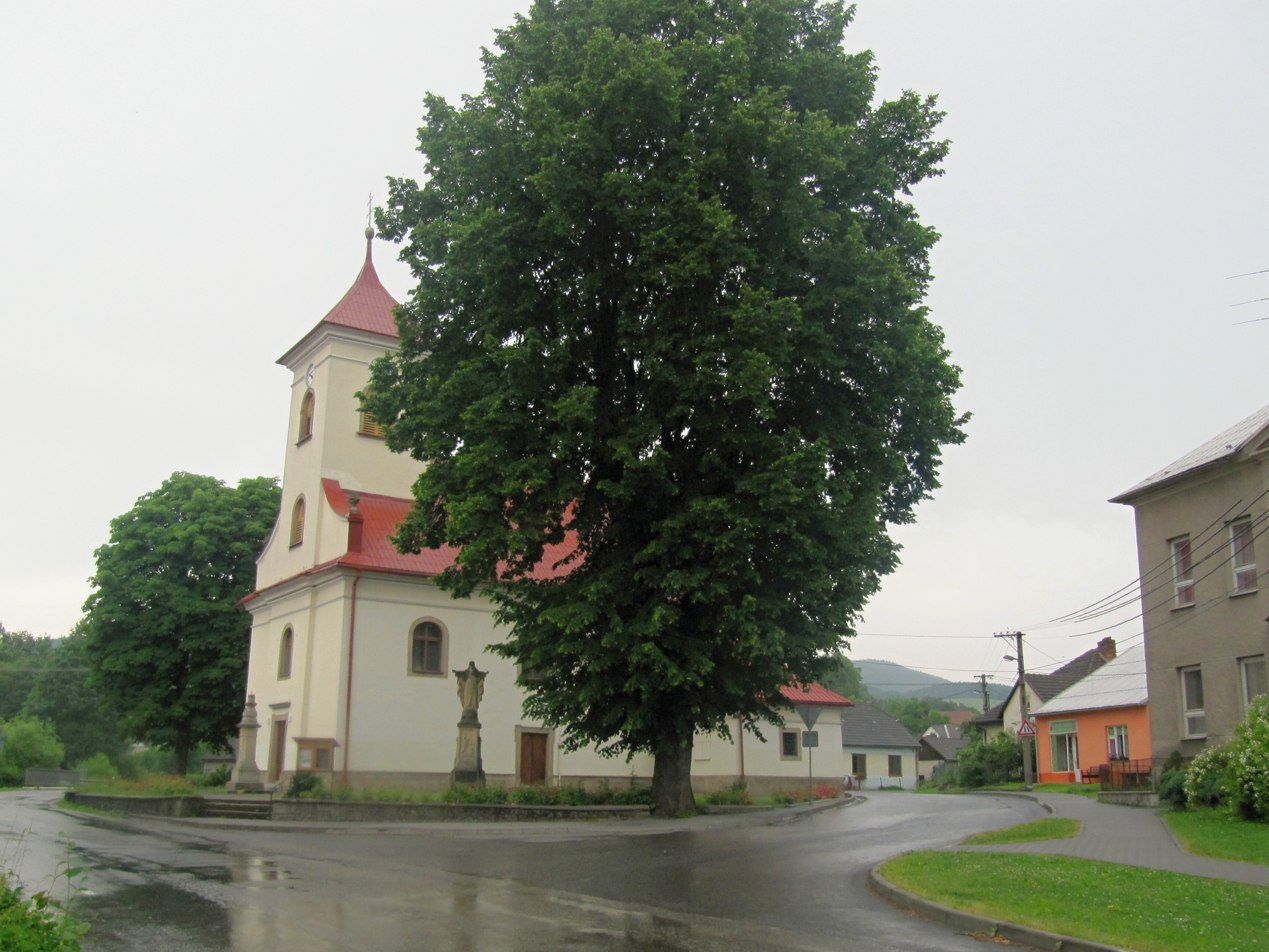
- Church of Saint Catherine

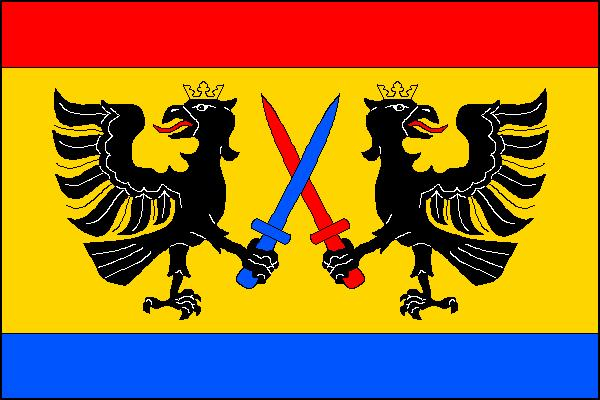
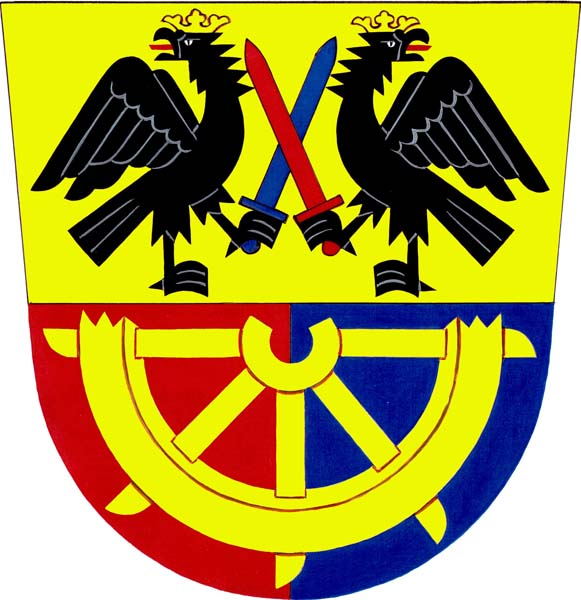
- Flag Coat of arms

- Location in the Czech Republic
- Coordinates: 49°17′43″N 17°47′8″E
- Country: Czech Republic
- Region: Zlín
- District: Zlín
- First mentioned: 1440

Area
  - Total: 8.42 km^{2} (3.25 sq mi)
- Elevation: 334 m (1,096 ft)

Population (2026-01-01)
  - Total: 1,016
  - Density: 121/km^{2} (313/sq mi)
- Time zone: UTC+1 (CET)
  - Summer (DST): UTC+2 (CEST)
- Postal code: 763 19
- Website: kasava.cz

Kašava is a municipality and village in Zlín District in the Zlín Region of the Czech Republic. It has about 1,000 inhabitants.

Kašava lies on the Dřevnice River, approximately 12 kilometres (7 mi) north-east of Zlín and 259 km (161 mi) east of Prague.

== Demographics ==
Historical population
Year	Pop.	±%
1869	690	—
1880	801	+16.1%
1890	878	+9.6%
1900	813	−7.4%
1910	809	−0.5%
1921	829	+2.5%
1930	831	+0.2%
1950	840	+1.1%
1961	926	+10.2%
1970	920	−0.6%
1980	851	−7.5%
1991	844	−0.8%
2001	882	+4.5%
2011	893	+1.2%
2021	893	+0.0%
Source: Censuses

== Twin towns – sister cities ==
Kašava is twinned with:

- Breitenbach, France
- Rohožník, Slovakia
