= Machová =

- Municipality
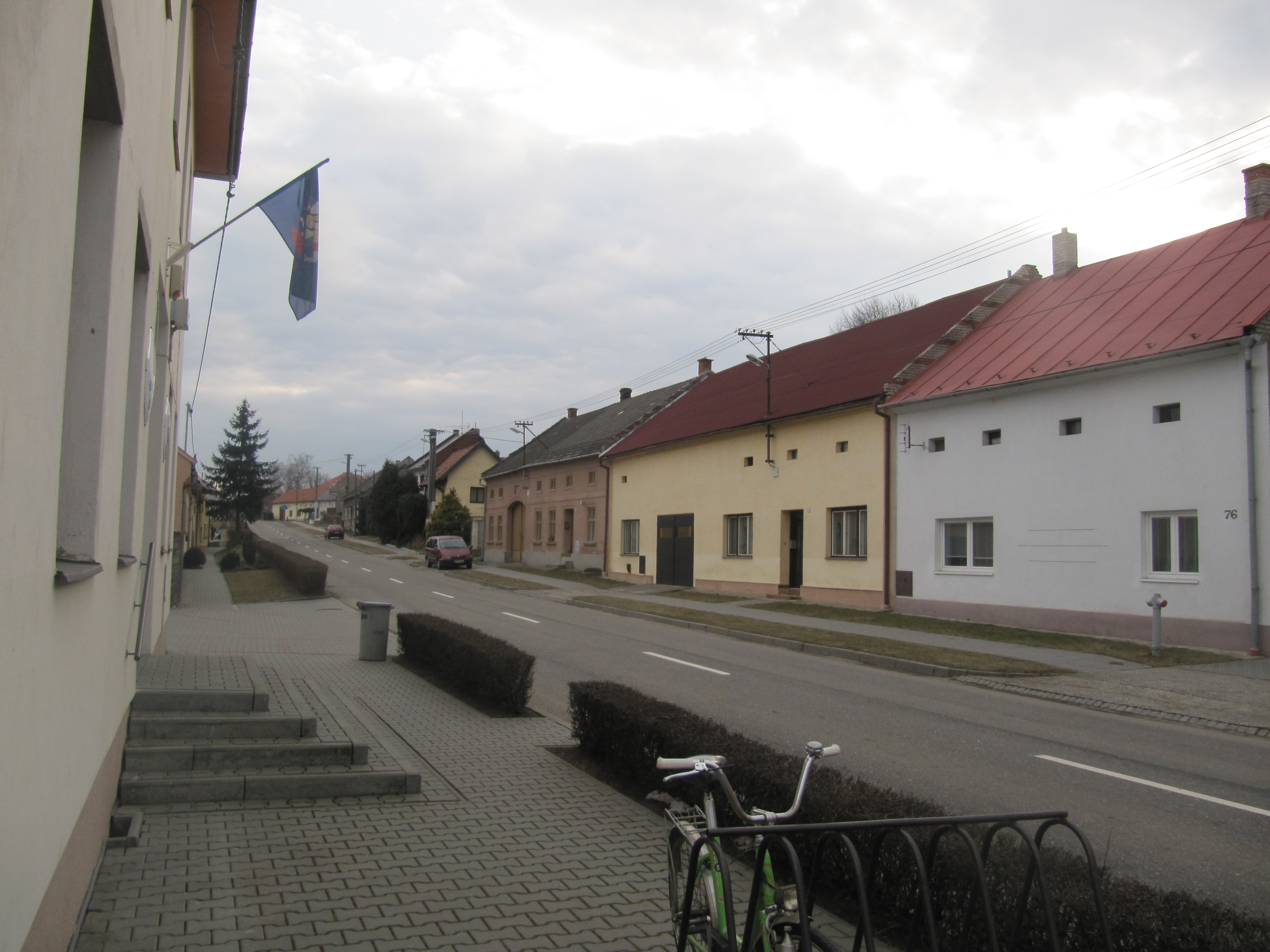
- Main street

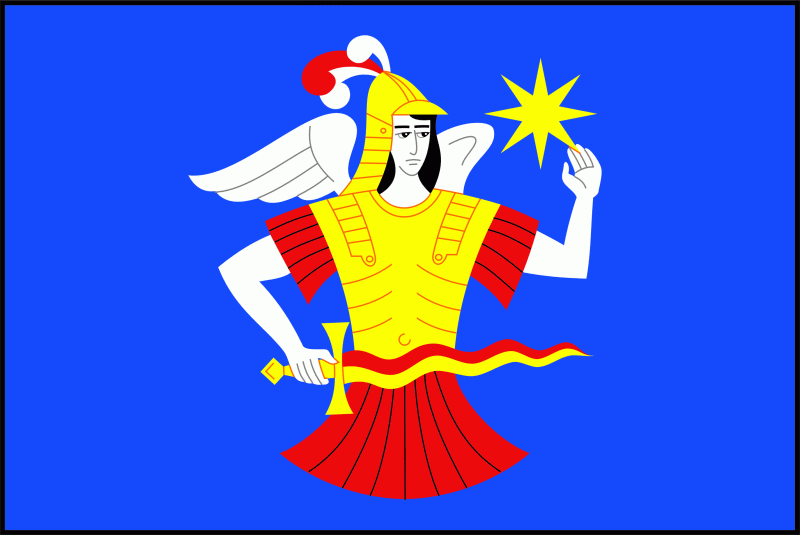
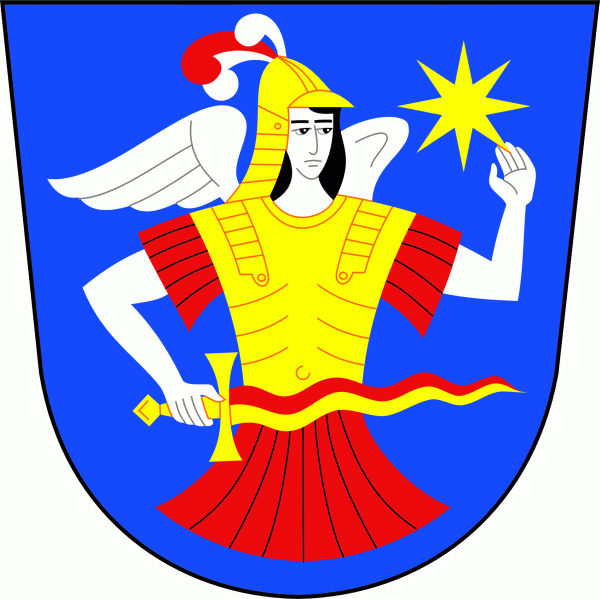
- Flag Coat of arms

- Location in the Czech Republic
- Coordinates: 49°15′16″N 17°32′42″E
- Country: Czech Republic
- Region: Zlín
- District: Zlín
- First mentioned: 1397

Area
  - Total: 3.15 km^{2} (1.22 sq mi)
- Elevation: 245 m (804 ft)

Population (2026-01-01)
  - Total: 712
  - Density: 226/km^{2} (585/sq mi)
- Time zone: UTC+1 (CET)
  - Summer (DST): UTC+2 (CEST)
- Postal code: 763 01
- Website: www.obecmachova.cz

Machová is a municipality and village in Zlín District in the Zlín Region of the Czech Republic. It has about 700 inhabitants.

Machová lies approximately 10 kilometres (6 mi) west of Zlín and 244 km (152 mi) east of Prague.

== Demographics ==
Historical population
Year	Pop.	±%
1869	247	—
1880	320	+29.6%
1890	361	+12.8%
1900	382	+5.8%
1910	417	+9.2%
1921	416	−0.2%
1930	441	+6.0%
1950	460	+4.3%
1961	465	+1.1%
1970	460	−1.1%
1980	543	+18.0%
1991	523	−3.7%
2001	531	+1.5%
2011	554	+4.3%
2021	641	+15.7%
Source: Censuses
