= Lípa (Zlín District) =

- Municipality
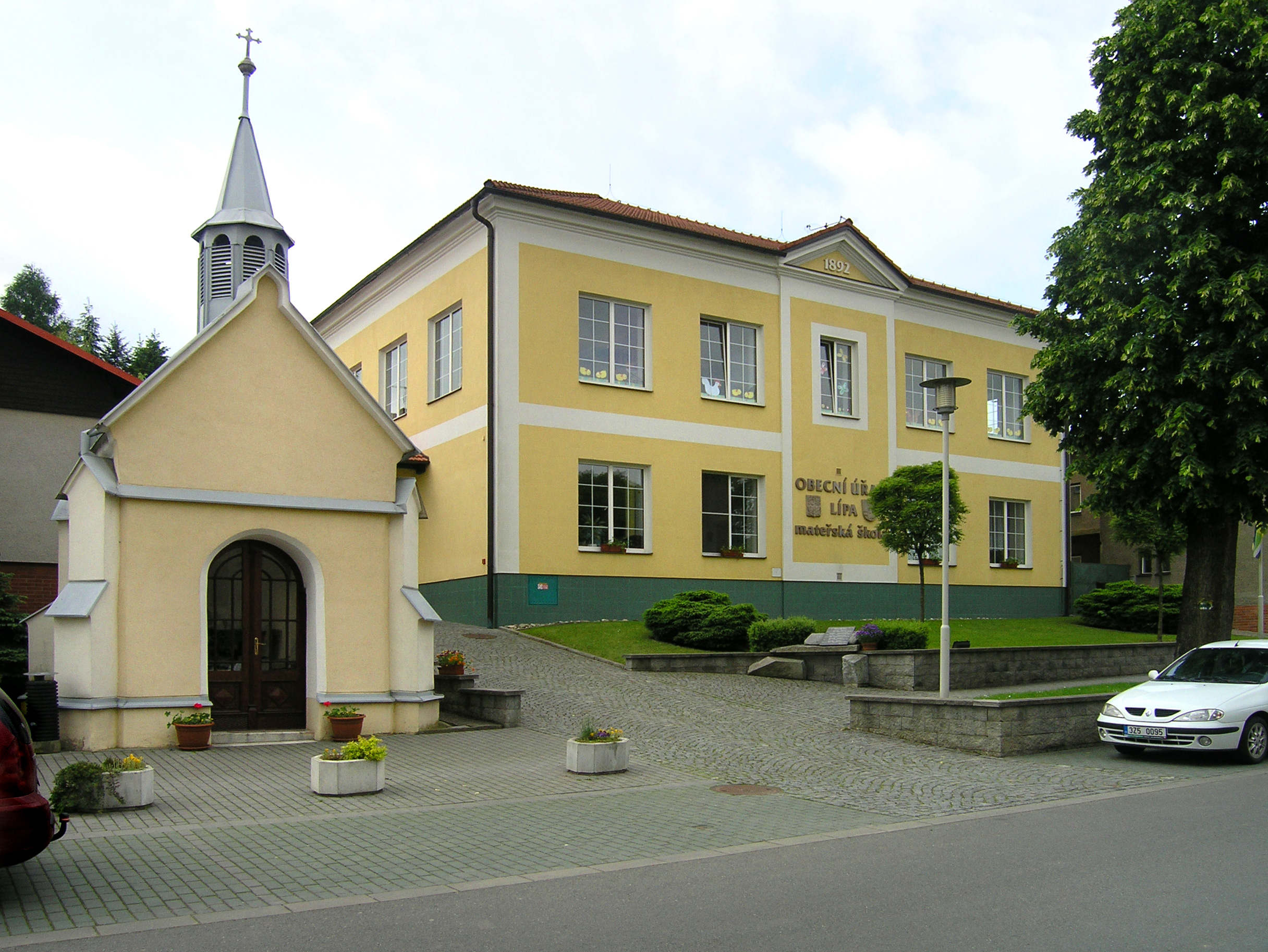
- Municipal office

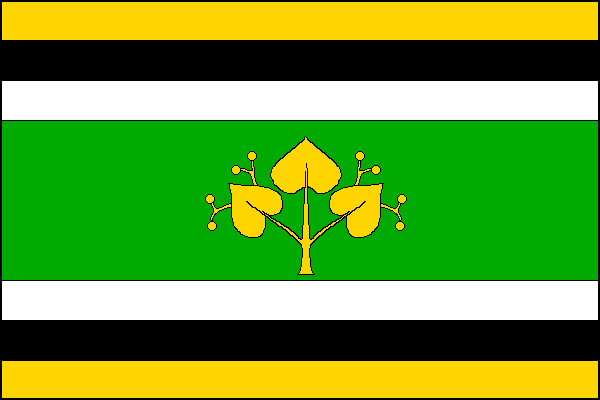
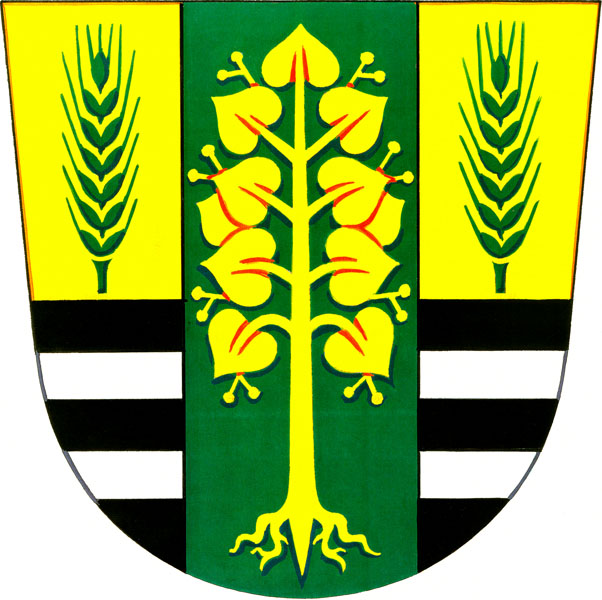
- Flag Coat of arms

- Location in the Czech Republic
- Coordinates: 49°12′55″N 17°46′7″E
- Country: Czech Republic
- Region: Zlín
- District: Zlín
- First mentioned: 1261

Area
  - Total: 8.35 km^{2} (3.22 sq mi)
- Elevation: 249 m (817 ft)

Population (2026-01-01)
  - Total: 837
  - Density: 100/km^{2} (260/sq mi)
- Time zone: UTC+1 (CET)
  - Summer (DST): UTC+2 (CEST)
- Postal code: 763 11
- Website: www.obeclipa.cz

Lípa is a municipality and village in Zlín District in the Zlín Region of the Czech Republic. It has about 800 inhabitants.

Lípa lies on the Dřevnice River, approximately 9 kilometres (6 mi) east of Zlín and 261 km (162 mi) east of Prague.

== Demographics ==
Historical population
Year	Pop.	±%
1869	630	—
1880	638	+1.3%
1890	622	−2.5%
1900	705	+13.3%
1910	693	−1.7%
1921	738	+6.5%
1930	864	+17.1%
1950	859	−0.6%
1961	895	+4.2%
1970	866	−3.2%
1980	730	−15.7%
1991	657	−10.0%
2001	629	−4.3%
2011	746	+18.6%
2021	828	+11.0%
Source: Censuses
