= Racková =

- Municipality
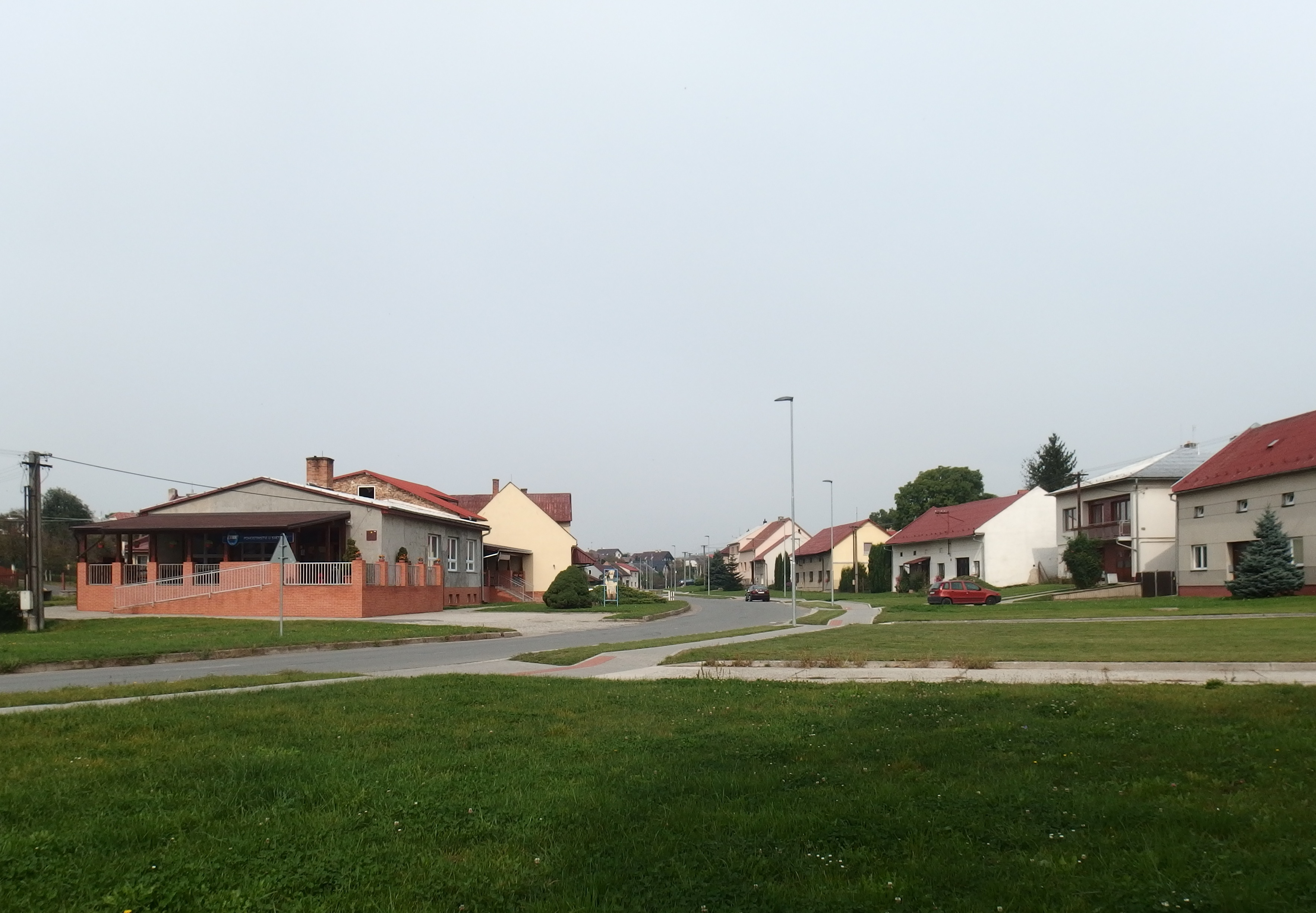
- Centre of Racková

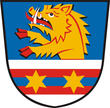
- Flag Coat of arms

- Location in the Czech Republic
- Coordinates: 49°16′37″N 17°37′30″E
- Country: Czech Republic
- Region: Zlín
- District: Zlín
- First mentioned: 1397

Area
  - Total: 11.18 km^{2} (4.32 sq mi)
- Elevation: 238 m (781 ft)

Population (2026-01-01)
  - Total: 841
  - Density: 75.2/km^{2} (195/sq mi)
- Time zone: UTC+1 (CET)
  - Summer (DST): UTC+2 (CEST)
- Postal code: 760 01
- Website: www.rackova.cz

Racková is a municipality and village in Zlín District in the Zlín Region of the Czech Republic. It has about 800 inhabitants.

Racková lies approximately 6 kilometres (4 mi) north-west of Zlín and 248 km (154 mi) east of Prague.

== Demographics ==
Historical population
Year	Pop.	±%
1869	543	—
1880	581	+7.0%
1890	616	+6.0%
1900	615	−0.2%
1910	657	+6.8%
1921	640	−2.6%
1930	680	+6.2%
1950	696	+2.4%
1961	728	+4.6%
1970	713	−2.1%
1980	678	−4.9%
1991	692	+2.1%
2001	662	−4.3%
2011	785	+18.6%
2021	818	+4.2%
Source: Censuses
