= Trnava (Zlín District) =

- Municipality
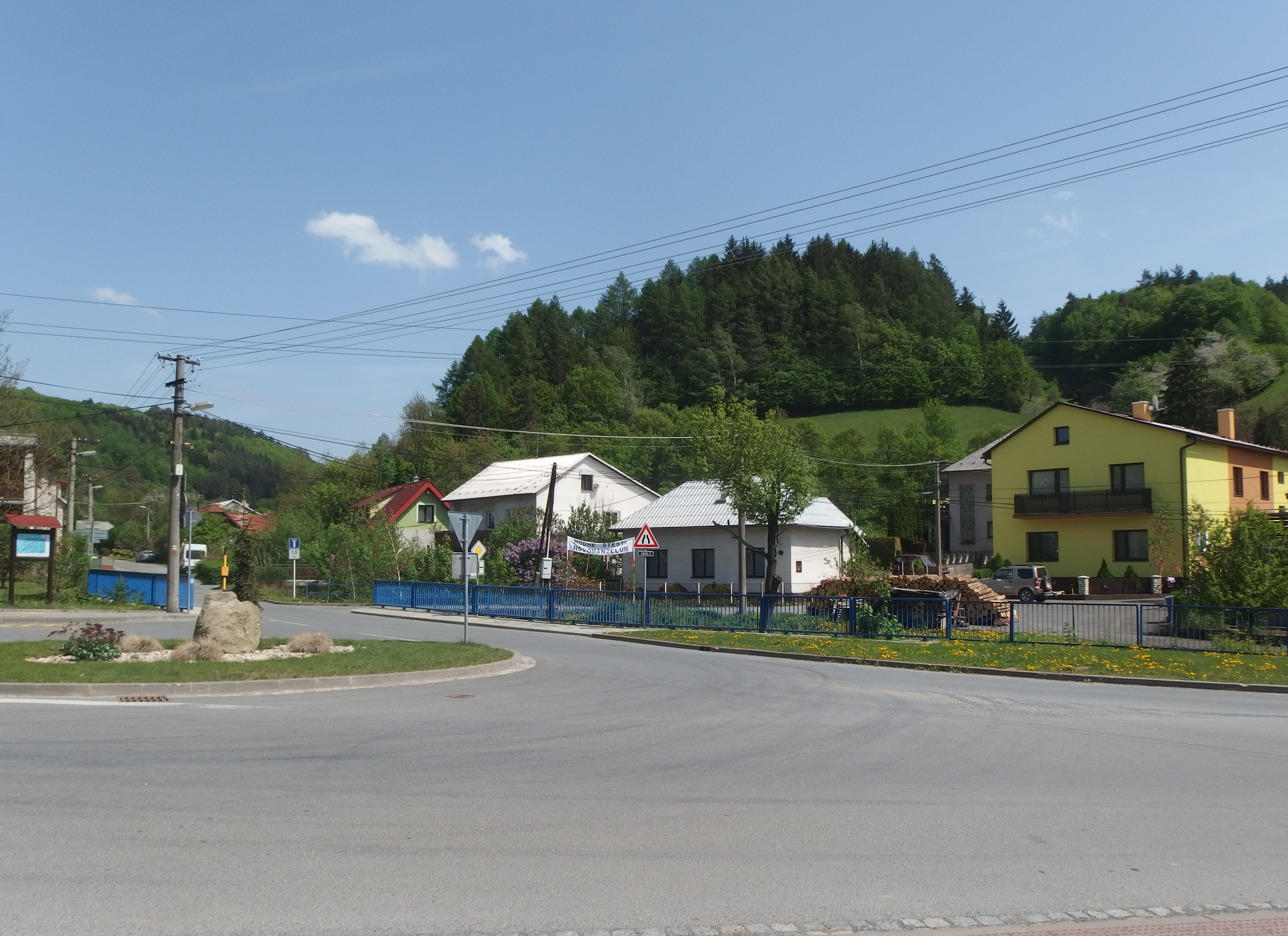
- Centre of Trnava

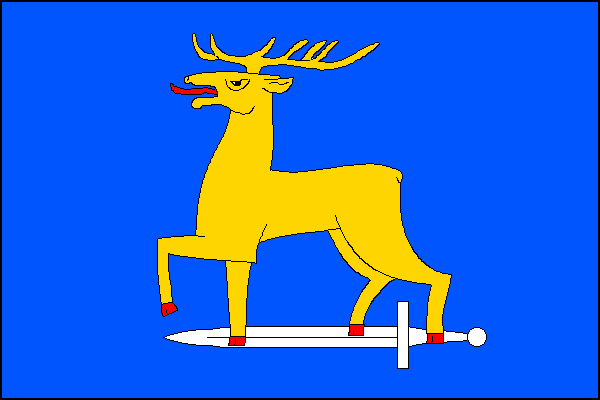
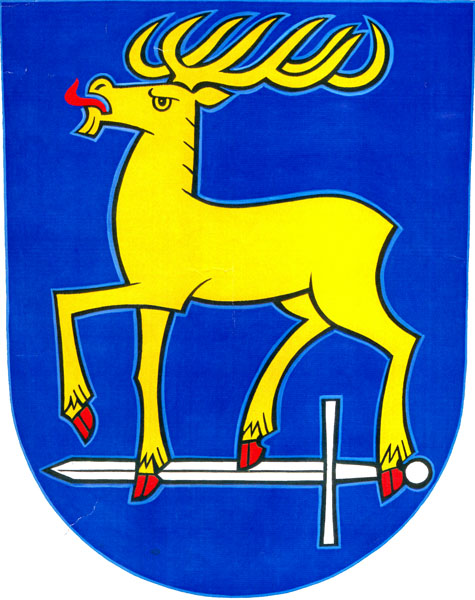
- Flag Coat of arms

- Location in the Czech Republic
- Coordinates: 49°17′46″N 17°50′31″E
- Country: Czech Republic
- Region: Zlín
- District: Zlín
- First mentioned: 1368

Area
  - Total: 18.83 km^{2} (7.27 sq mi)
- Elevation: 341 m (1,119 ft)

Population (2026-01-01)
  - Total: 1,167
  - Density: 61.98/km^{2} (160.5/sq mi)
- Time zone: UTC+1 (CET)
  - Summer (DST): UTC+2 (CEST)
- Postal code: 763 18
- Website: www.trnava.cz

Trnava is a municipality and village in Zlín District in the Zlín Region of the Czech Republic. It has about 1,200 inhabitants.

Trnava lies approximately 16 kilometres (10 mi) north-east of Zlín and 262 km (163 mi) east of Prague.

== Demographics ==
Historical population
Year	Pop.	±%
1869	1,055	—
1880	1,079	+2.3%
1890	1,116	+3.4%
1900	1,179	+5.6%
1910	1,168	−0.9%
1921	1,192	+2.1%
1930	1,116	−6.4%
1950	1,201	+7.6%
1961	1,397	+16.3%
1970	1,305	−6.6%
1980	1,202	−7.9%
1991	1,145	−4.7%
2001	1,141	−0.3%
2011	1,124	−1.5%
2021	1,133	+0.8%
Source: Censuses
