= Držková =

- Municipality
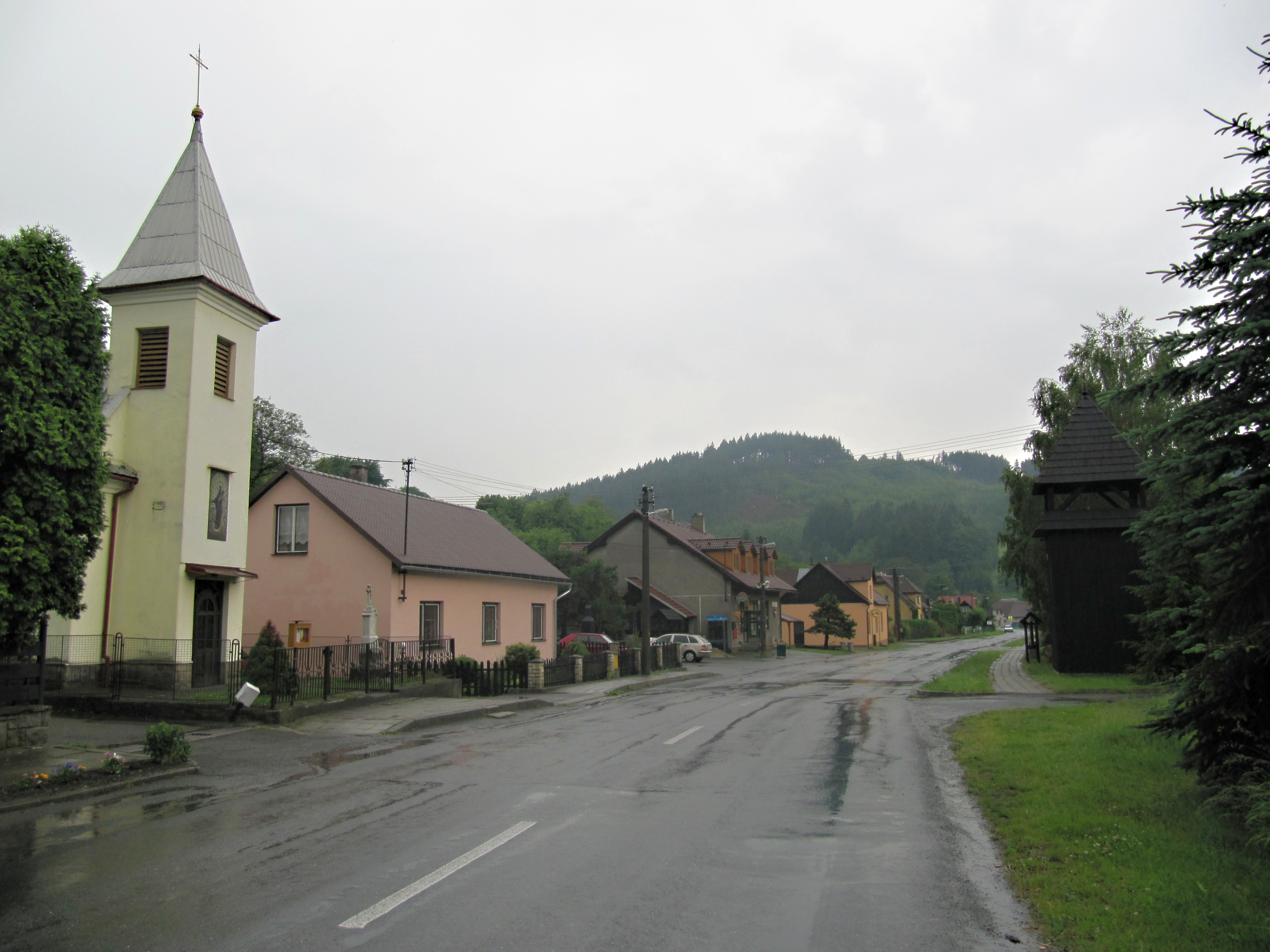
- Main street

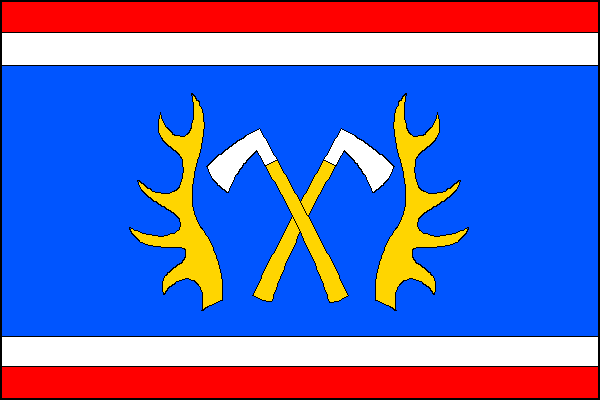
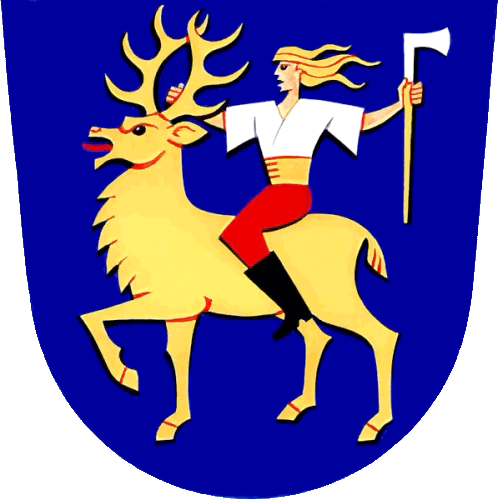
- Flag Coat of arms

- Location in the Czech Republic
- Coordinates: 49°19′9″N 17°47′8″E
- Country: Czech Republic
- Region: Zlín
- District: Zlín
- First mentioned: 1391

Area
  - Total: 20.88 km^{2} (8.06 sq mi)
- Elevation: 378 m (1,240 ft)

Population (2026-01-01)
  - Total: 370
  - Density: 18/km^{2} (46/sq mi)
- Time zone: UTC+1 (CET)
  - Summer (DST): UTC+2 (CEST)
- Postal code: 763 19
- Website: www.drzkova.cz

Držková a municipality and village in Zlín District in the Zlín Region of the Czech Republic. It has about 400 inhabitants.

Držková lies approximately 15 kilometres (9 mi) north-east of Zlín and 258 km (160 mi) east of Prague.

== Demographics ==
Historical population
Year	Pop.	±%
1869	790	—
1880	849	+7.5%
1890	789	−7.1%
1900	767	−2.8%
1910	709	−7.6%
1921	743	+4.8%
1930	735	−1.1%
1950	584	−20.5%
1961	633	+8.4%
1970	549	−13.3%
1980	405	−26.2%
1991	343	−15.3%
2001	331	−3.5%
2011	348	+5.1%
2021	335	−3.7%
Source: Censuses
