= Hrobice (Zlín District) =

- Municipality
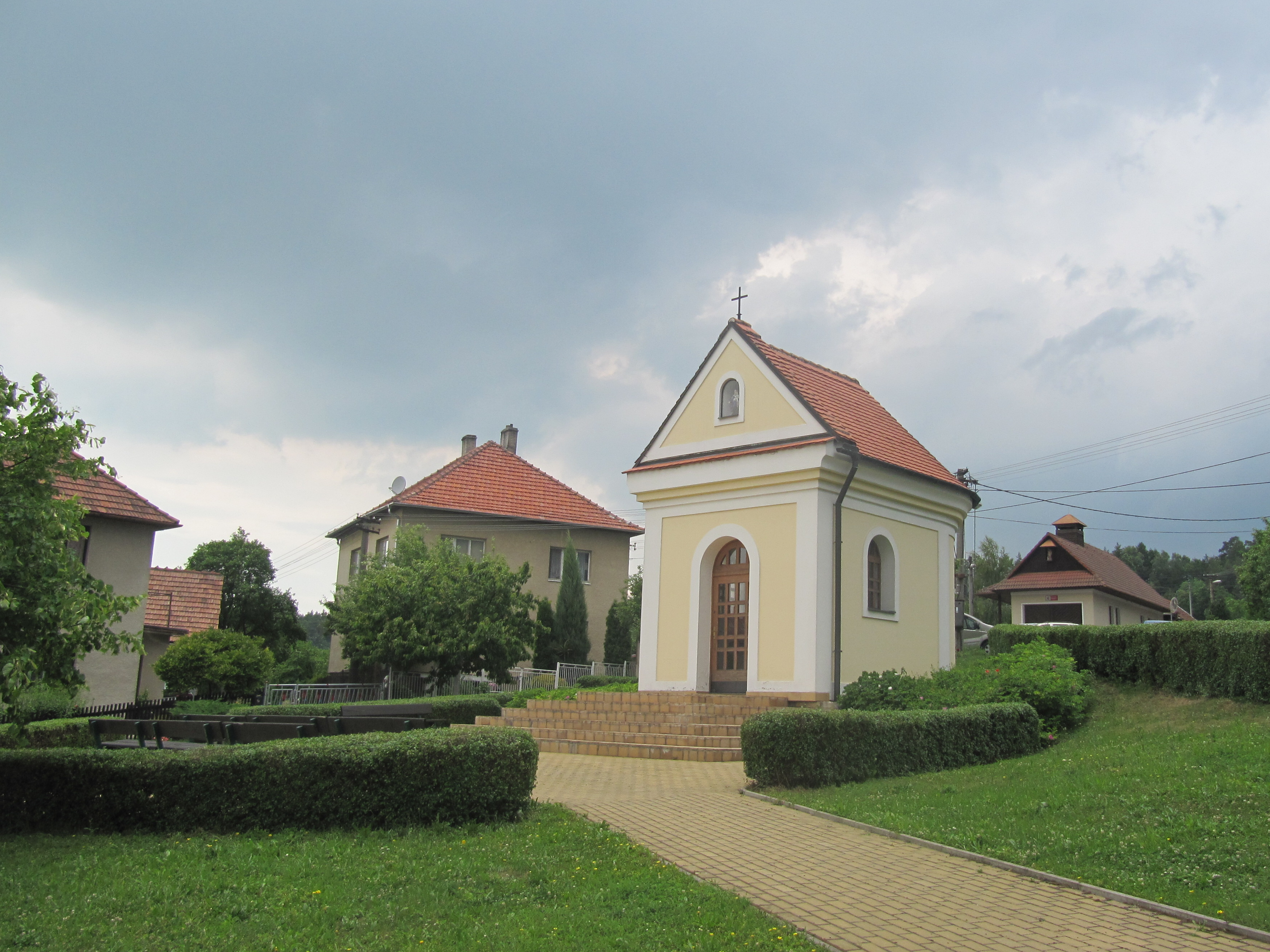
- Chapel of Our Lady of Seven Sorrows

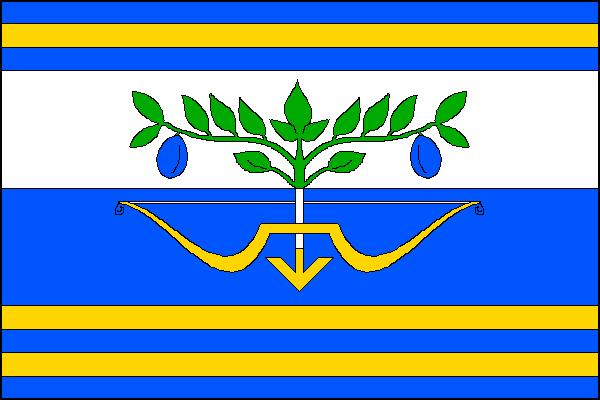
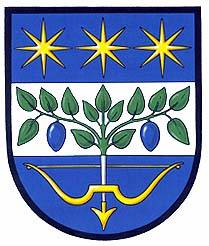
- Flag Coat of arms

- Location in the Czech Republic
- Coordinates: 49°16′39″N 17°47′18″E
- Country: Czech Republic
- Region: Zlín
- District: Zlín
- First mentioned: 1446

Area
  - Total: 4.45 km^{2} (1.72 sq mi)
- Elevation: 390 m (1,280 ft)

Population (2026-01-01)
  - Total: 463
  - Density: 104/km^{2} (269/sq mi)
- Time zone: UTC+1 (CET)
  - Summer (DST): UTC+2 (CEST)
- Postal code: 763 15
- Website: www.hrobice.cz

Hrobice is a municipality and village in Zlín District in the Zlín Region of the Czech Republic. It has about 500 inhabitants.

Hrobice lies approximately 11 kilometres (7 mi) north-east of Zlín and 259 km (161 mi) east of Prague.

== Demographics ==
Historical population
Year	Pop.	±%
1869	394	—
1880	434	+10.2%
1890	426	−1.8%
1900	445	+4.5%
1910	464	+4.3%
1921	422	−9.1%
1930	439	+4.0%
1950	434	−1.1%
1961	515	+18.7%
1970	486	−5.6%
1980	475	−2.3%
1991	433	−8.8%
2001	449	+3.7%
2011	488	+8.7%
2021	464	−4.9%
Source: Censuses
