= Zlín =

City in the Czech Republic

- Statutory city
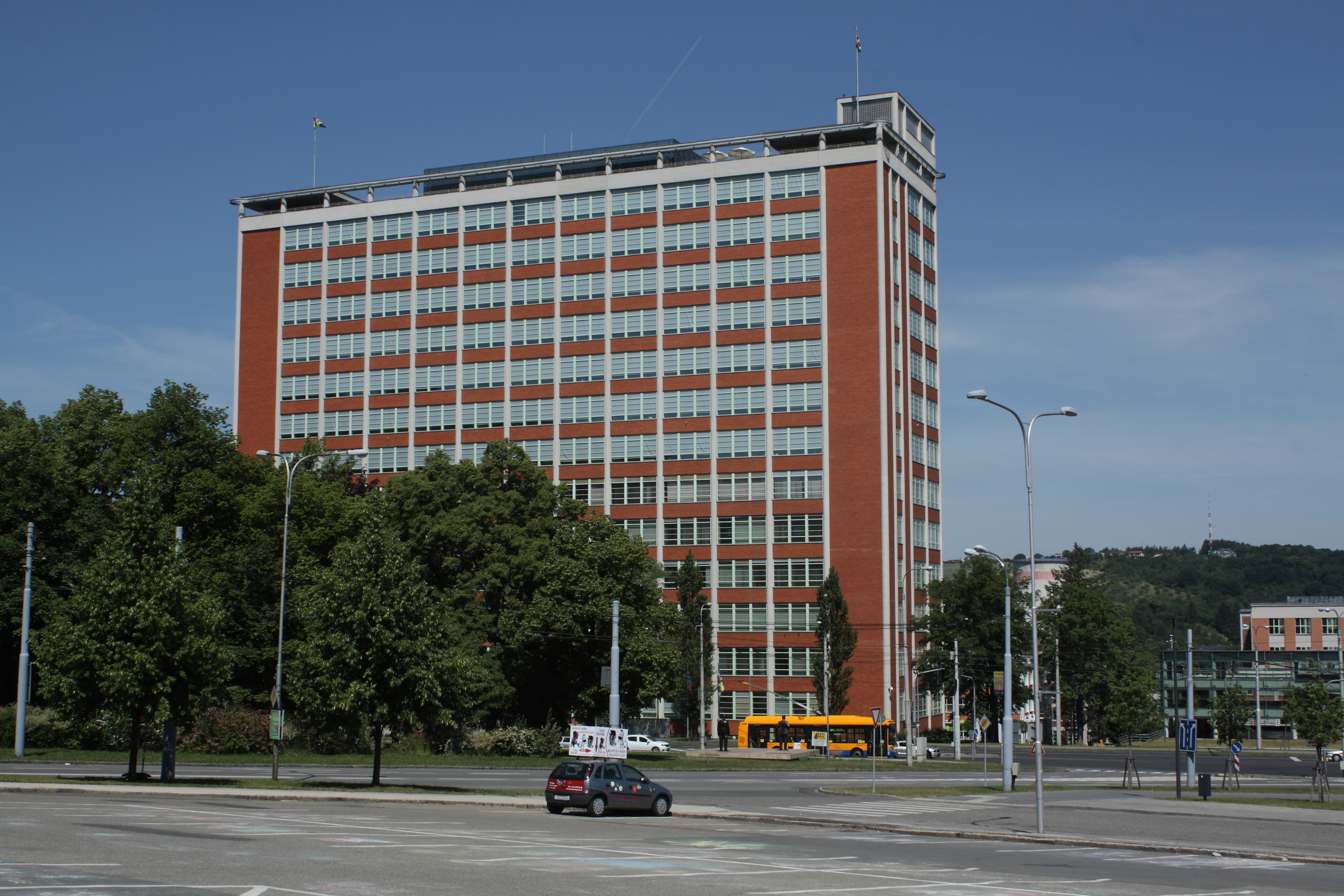
- Iconic constructivist Baťa's Skyscraper

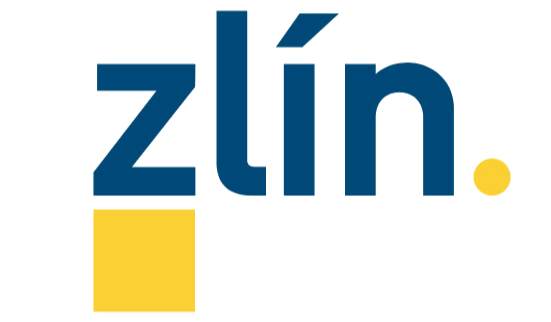
- Flag Coat of arms Wordmark

- Location in the Czech Republic
- Coordinates: 49°13′59″N 17°40′1″E
- Country: Czech Republic
- Region: Zlín
- District: Zlín
- First mentioned: 1322

Government
  - Mayor: Čestmír Vančura

Area
  - Total: 102.83 km^{2} (39.70 sq mi)
- Elevation: 230 m (750 ft)

Population (2026-01-01)
  - Total: 74,917
  - Density: 728.55/km^{2} (1,886.9/sq mi)
- Time zone: UTC+1 (CET)
  - Summer (DST): UTC+2 (CEST)
- Postal code: 760 01
- Website: www.zlin.eu/en/

Zlín (Czech pronunciation: [zliːn]; German: Zlin; during 1949–1989: Gottwaldov) is a city in the Czech Republic. It has about 75,000 inhabitants. It is the seat of the Zlín Region and it lies on the Dřevnice River. It is known as an industrial centre. The development of the modern city is closely connected to the Bata Shoes company and its social scheme, developed after World War I. A large part of Zlín is urbanistically and architecturally valuable and is protected as an urban monument zone.

== Administrative division ==
Zlín consists of 16 municipal parts (in brackets population according to the 2021 census):

- Zlín (48,317)
- Prštné (3,345)
- Louky (1,027)
- Mladcová (2,525)
- Příluky (2,931)
- Jaroslavice (822)
- Kudlov (2,195)
- Malenovice (7,156)
- Chlum (144)
- Klečůvka (332)
- Kostelec (1,909)
- Lhotka (235)
- Lužkovice (634)
- Salaš (195)
- Štípa (1,798)
- Velíková (613)

Prštné, Louky, Mladcová, Příluky, Jaroslavice, Kudlov and Malenovice are urbanistically fused with the Zlín proper. They are sometimes called Zlín II–VIII, which was part of their name at the time when they were administratively merged with Zlín.

== Etymology ==
There are several legends about the origin of the name of the city, according to which it was derived from slín (i.e. 'marl') or zlaté jablko (i.e. 'golden apple'). However, the name Zlín was most likely derived from the old personal Slavic name Zla, Zlen or Zleš.

From 1949 to 1989, the city was renamed Gottwaldov after the first communist president of Czechoslovakia Klement Gottwald. On 1 January 1990, the city's name was changed back to Zlín.

== Geography ==
Zlín is located about 70 kilometres (43 mi) east of Brno. It forms an urban area together with the town of Otrokovice. The territory of the city lies in the Vizovice Highlands. The highest point is the hill Tlustá hora at 458 m (1,503 ft) above sea level. The Dřevnice River flows through the city. The Fryšták Reservoir is situated in the northern part of the municipal territory.

=== Climate ===
Zlín's climate is classified as humid continental climate (Köppen: Dfb; Trewartha: Dobk). Among them, the annual average temperature is 9.5 °C (49.1 °F), the hottest month in July is 20.2 °C (68.4 °F), and the coldest month is 0.2 °C (32.4 °F) in January. The annual precipitation is 672.3 millimetres (26.47 in), of which July is the wettest with 84.7 millimetres (3.33 in), while January is the driest with only 32.8 millimetres (1.29 in). The extreme temperature throughout the year ranged from −28.0 °C (−18.4 °F) on 9 February 1956 to 36.5 °C (97.7 °F) on 8 July 1957.

Climate data for Zlín, 1991–2020 normals, extremes 1954–present
| Month | Jan | Feb | Mar | Apr | May | Jun | Jul | Aug | Sep | Oct | Nov | Dec | Year |
|---|---|---|---|---|---|---|---|---|---|---|---|---|---|
| Record high °C (°F) | 13.8 (56.8) | 17.9 (64.2) | 23.9 (75.0) | 28.5 (83.3) | 30.9 (87.6) | 35.2 (95.4) | 36.5 (97.7) | 35.5 (95.9) | 31.8 (89.2) | 26.3 (79.3) | 20.2 (68.4) | 15.0 (59.0) | 36.5 (97.7) |
| Mean daily maximum °C (°F) | 3.2 (37.8) | 4.9 (40.8) | 9.1 (48.4) | 15.0 (59.0) | 19.2 (66.6) | 22.8 (73.0) | 26.7 (80.1) | 26.3 (79.3) | 20.6 (69.1) | 13.8 (56.8) | 6.2 (43.2) | 2.8 (37.0) | 14.2 (57.6) |
| Daily mean °C (°F) | 0.2 (32.4) | 1.1 (34.0) | 4.7 (40.5) | 9.3 (48.7) | 13.4 (56.1) | 17.2 (63.0) | 20.2 (68.4) | 19.8 (67.6) | 14.8 (58.6) | 9.1 (48.4) | 3.4 (38.1) | 0.2 (32.4) | 9.5 (49.1) |
| Mean daily minimum °C (°F) | −2.7 (27.1) | −2.8 (27.0) | 0.9 (33.6) | 3.5 (38.3) | 7.4 (45.3) | 11.3 (52.3) | 13.6 (56.5) | 13.9 (57.0) | 10.1 (50.2) | 5.5 (41.9) | 0.7 (33.3) | −2.2 (28.0) | 4.9 (40.8) |
| Record low °C (°F) | −27.7 (−17.9) | −28.0 (−18.4) | −20.1 (−4.2) | −8.5 (16.7) | −3.6 (25.5) | 1.4 (34.5) | 3.0 (37.4) | 1.9 (35.4) | −1.5 (29.3) | −6.1 (21.0) | −15.5 (4.1) | −25.5 (−13.9) | −28.0 (−18.4) |
| Average precipitation mm (inches) | 32.8 (1.29) | 33.6 (1.32) | 43.5 (1.71) | 39.3 (1.55) | 67.6 (2.66) | 77.4 (3.05) | 84.7 (3.33) | 75.2 (2.96) | 64.6 (2.54) | 50.7 (2.00) | 46.9 (1.85) | 56.0 (2.20) | 672.3 (26.47) |
| Average snowfall cm (inches) | 10.4 (4.1) | 10.5 (4.1) | 3.6 (1.4) | 0.1 (0.0) | 0.0 (0.0) | 0.0 (0.0) | 0.0 (0.0) | 0.0 (0.0) | 0.0 (0.0) | 0.0 (0.0) | 3.3 (1.3) | 15.2 (6.0) | 43.0 (16.9) |
| Average relative humidity (%) | 81.4 | 76.8 | 73.4 | 65.3 | 69.2 | 71.8 | 66.3 | 67.1 | 75.9 | 80.9 | 84.5 | 84.9 | 74.8 |
Source: Czech Hydrometeorological Institute

== History ==
=== 14th–16th centuries ===
The first written mention of Zlín is from 1322, when it was acquired by Queen Elizabeth Richeza. In that time, Zlín was already a market town and served as a craft guild centre for the surrounding area of Moravian Wallachia. From 1358, the Zlín estate was owned by Bishop Albrecht of Šternberk and soon became the seat of the Moravian branch of the Šternberk family. In 1397, the town privileges of Zlín were extended and Zlín became a town. This significantly helped the economic development of Zlín.

The Hussite Wars badly affected properties of the Sternbergs and they were forced to sell Zlín in 1437. In the second half of the 15th century, Zlín was threatened by the Bohemian–Hungarian War. The 16th century brought peace and prosperity to the town. Trade and crafts flourished, mainly drapery, pottery and shoemaking. New villages were founded in the vicinity of Zlín, which became a large town and economic centre.

=== 17th–19th centuries ===
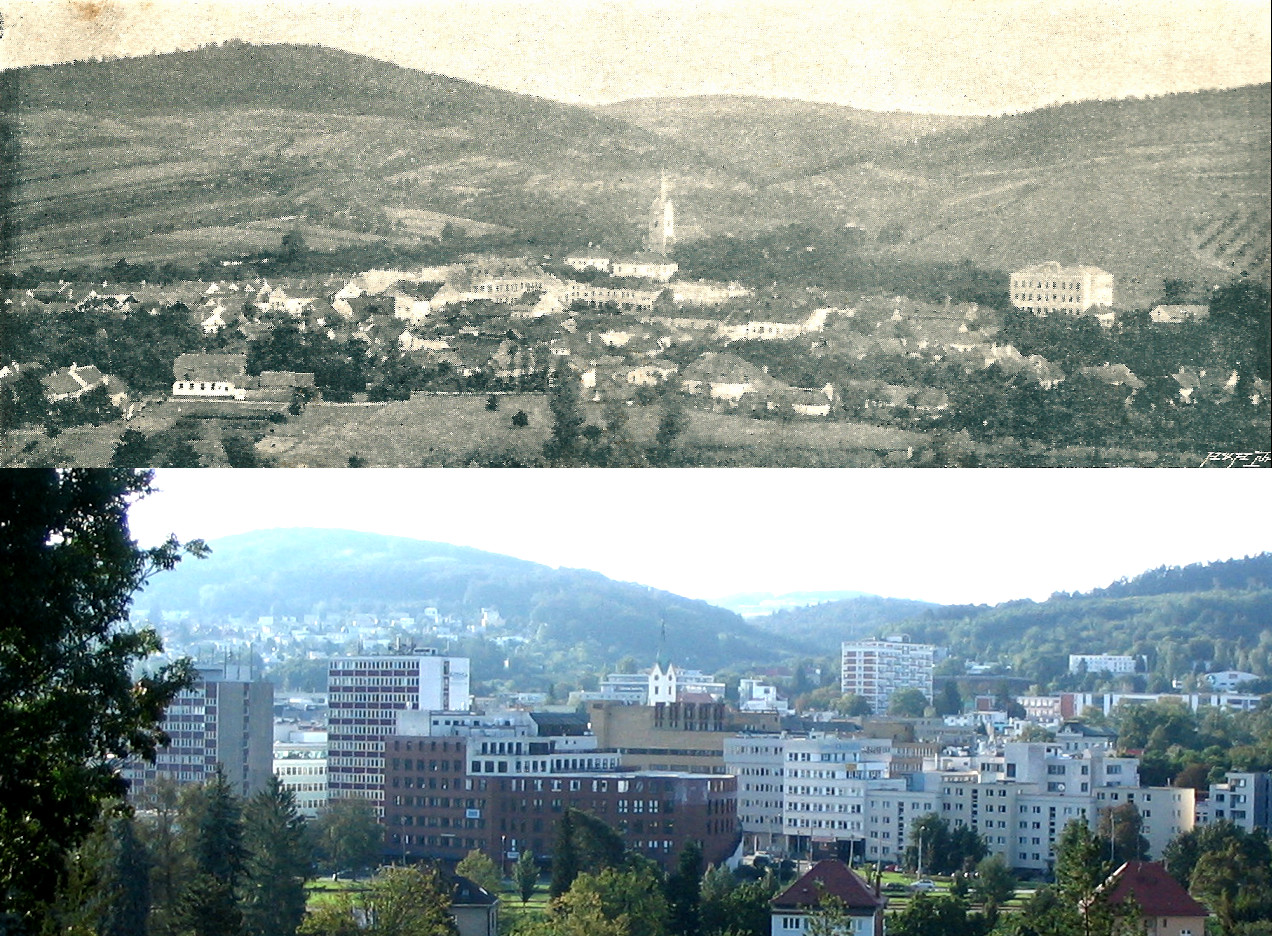
Zlín in 1898 vs 2019

In 1605, Zlín was raided and burned by Hungarian rebels. The Thirty Years' War left the town severely damaged and half deserted. The residents of Zlín, along with people from the whole Wallachian region, led an uprising against the Habsburg monarchy. The rebellion was however bloodily suppressed in 1644. After the war, Zlín became property of the Hungarian noble family of Serényi, but they did not care much for the town, and therefore Zlín recovered only slowly.

Economic activity was restored in the 18th century. Larger industrial enterprises appeared in the mid-19th century. A small match factory was established in 1850 and a shoe factory in 1870, but both were soon closed, and the town continued to live mainly from the work of craftsmen. In 1899, the railway was built.

=== 20th century ===
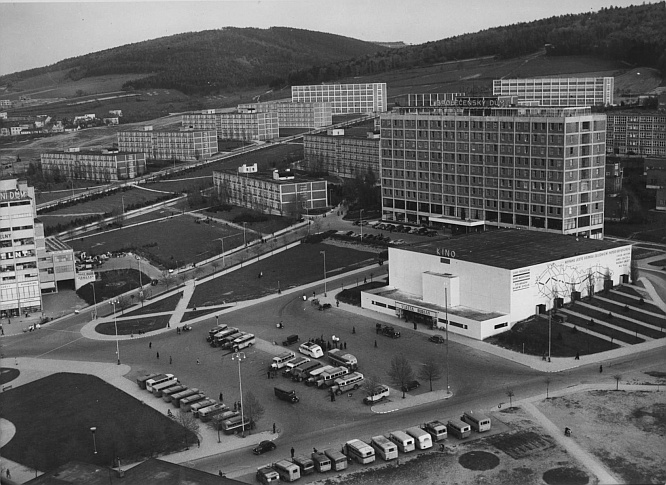
Old Zlín

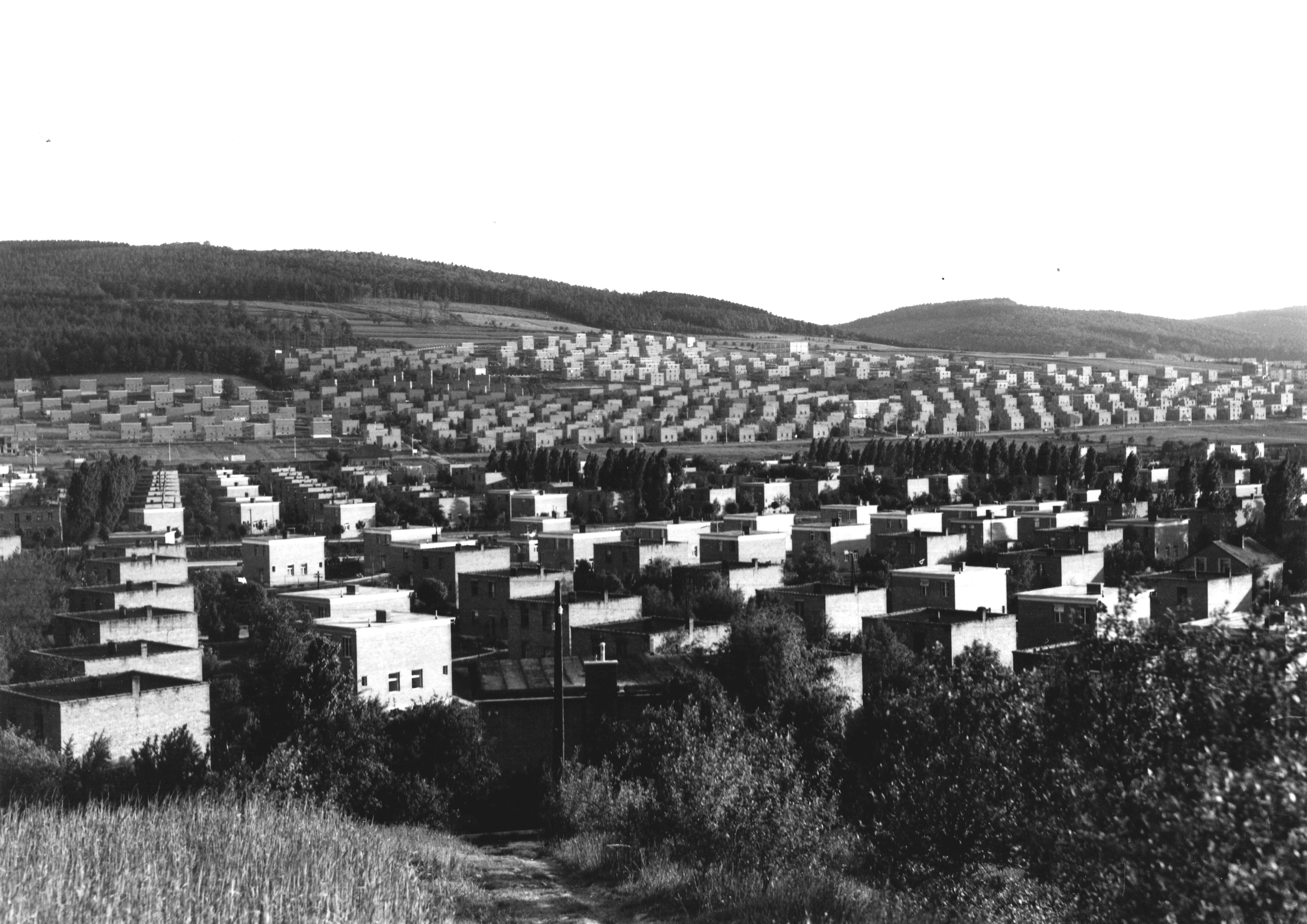
Houses for employees

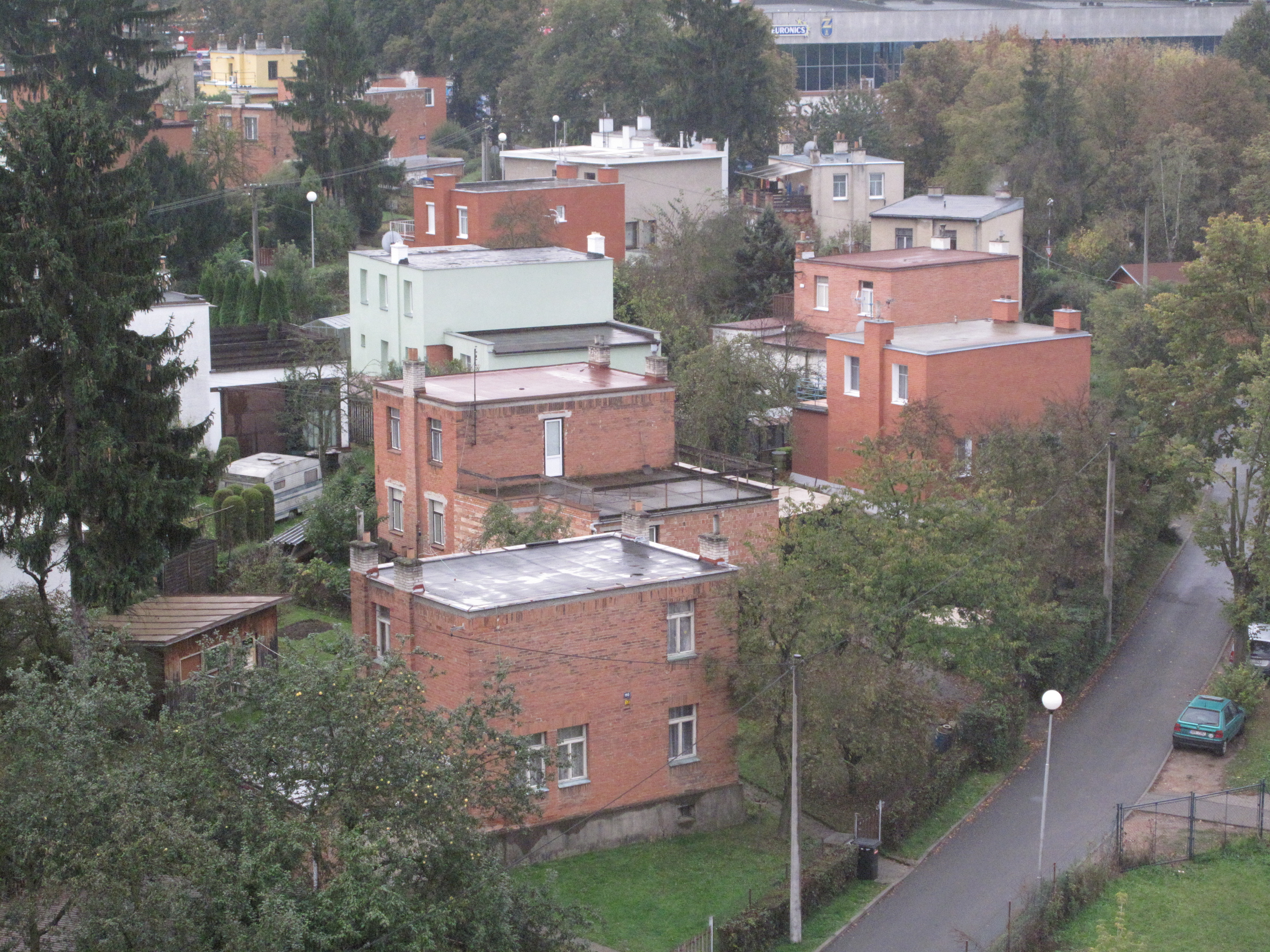
Baťa houses

Zlín began to grow rapidly after Tomáš Baťa and his siblings founded a shoe factory there in 1894, known as Bata Company. Production gradually increased, as did the number of employees and the population of the town. Baťa's factory supplied the Austro-Hungarian army in World War I. Due to the remarkable economic growth of the company and the increasing prosperity of its workers, Baťa himself was elected mayor of Zlín in 1923.

Baťa became the leading manufacturer and marketer of footwear in Czechoslovakia in 1922. Besides producing footwear, the company diversified into engineering, chemistry, rubber technology and many more areas. The factory hired thousands of workers who moved to Zlín. A new large complex of modern buildings and facilities was gradually built by the Baťa's company on the outskirts of the town in 1923–1938. It included thousands of flats, schools, department stores, scientific facilities, and a hospital. The development took place in a controlled manner and was based on modern urban concepts with the contribution of important architects of the time. Zlín became a hypermodern industrial city with functionalist character unique in Europe.

After the death of Tomáš Baťa in 1932, the company was managed by Jan Antonín Baťa, Hugo Vavrečka and Dominik Čipera, who also became the mayor. The Baťa company and also the city of Zlín continued growing. In 1929–1935, a strong economic agglomeration Zlín–Otrokovice–Napajedla developed. In 1935, the city became the seat of the administrative district.

During World War II, life in the city was controlled by German occupiers, and development of both the city and the company stopped. Zlín was most severely affected by the war in 1944, when it was bombed by the United States Army and large parts of the factories were destroyed. Zlín was liberated by the Soviet and Romanian armies on 2 May 1945.

The communists took over management of Zlín and Baťa factories, and in October 1945 the Bata company in Czechoslovakia was nationalised. In the following decades, Zlín preserved its significant position thanks to its extensive industrial production. The city strengthened its position as administrative, economic, educational and cultural centre of eastern Moravia. Zlín further expanded with construction of new housing estates.

== Demographics ==
Historical population

| Year | Pop. | ±% |
|---|---|---|
| 1869 | 9,889 | — |
| 1880 | 10,265 | +3.8% |
| 1890 | 10,455 | +1.9% |
| 1900 | 10,944 | +4.7% |
| 1910 | 11,970 | +9.4% |

| Year | Pop. | ±% |
|---|---|---|
| 1921 | 13,488 | +12.7% |
| 1930 | 33,068 | +145.2% |
| 1950 | 59,364 | +79.5% |
| 1961 | 61,203 | +3.1% |
| 1970 | 68,436 | +11.8% |

| Year | Pop. | ±% |
|---|---|---|
| 1980 | 77,460 | +13.2% |
| 1991 | 81,146 | +4.8% |
| 2001 | 78,833 | −2.9% |
| 2011 | 75,318 | −4.5% |
| 2021 | 74,178 | −1.5% |

Source: Censuses

== Economy ==
The largest industrial employer with headquarters in Zlín is TAJMAC-ZPS, a manufacturer of machine tools with more than 500 employees. Bata Corporation (in the Czech Republic officially known as Baťa a.s.) is now primarily a trading company and shoe production takes place outside the city.

Zlín is home to many large companies and organisations of the service sector. The largest employer in the city is the Regional Hospital of T. Baťa with more than 3,000 employees. Other notable employers are HP Tronic (main activity is trade in consumer electronics under the Datart and Eta brands), Tomas Bata University in Zlín (education) and Tescoma (trade and manufacture of kitchen utensils).

The Zlín agglomeration was defined as a tool for drawing money from the European Structural and Investment Funds. It is an area that includes the city and its surroundings, linked to the city by commuting and migration. It has about 130,000 inhabitants.

== Transport ==
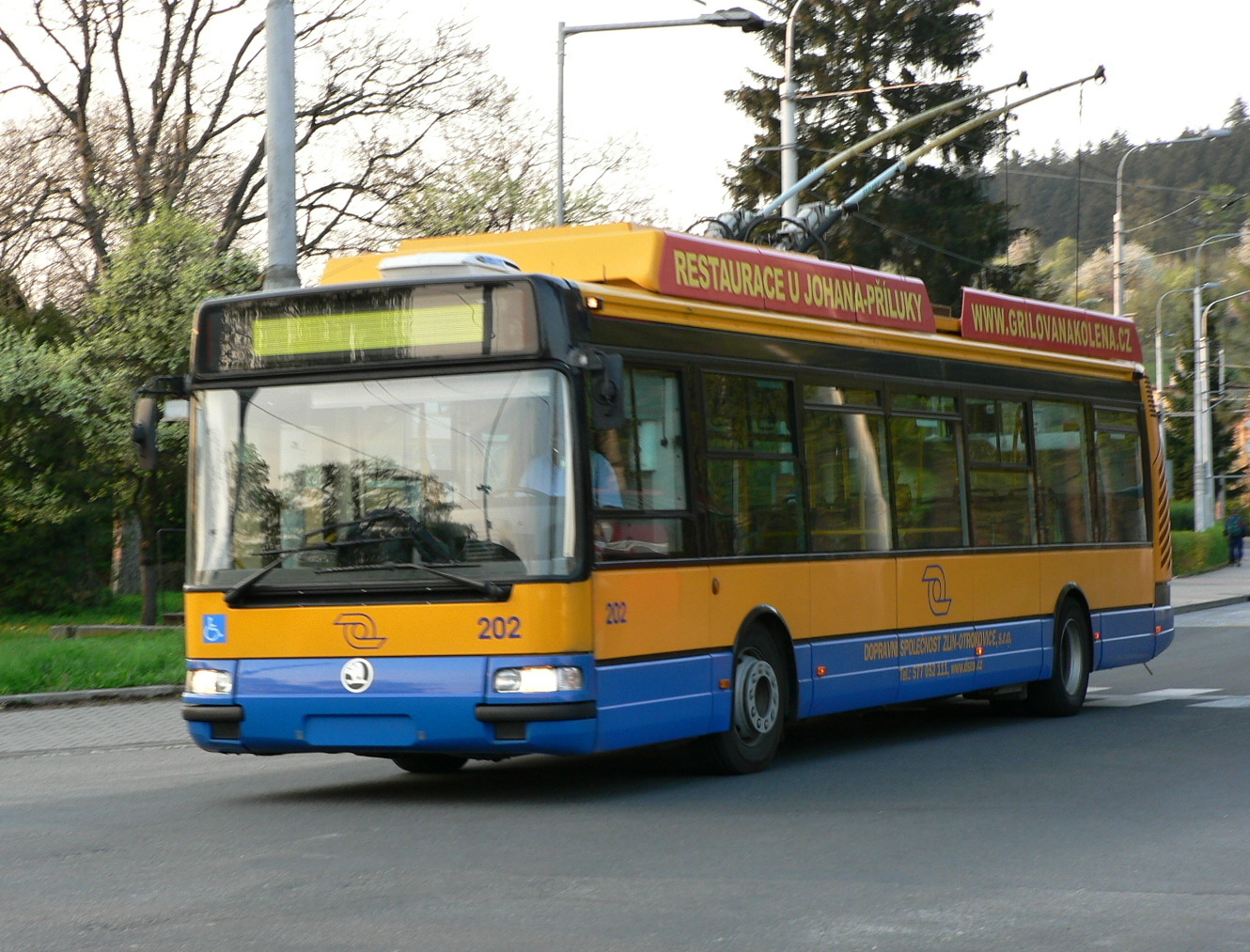
Trolleybus Škoda 24Tr Irisbus

Public city transport includes trolleybus service, which was launched in January 1944 and originally included three lines: A, B and C. Today the city, together with neighbouring Otrokovice, operates 14 trolleybus lines and 19 bus lines through the company Dopravní společnost Zlín-Otrokovice, s.r.o. (Zlín-Otrokovice Transport Company).

The I/49 road passes through the city. It connects Zlín with Otrokovice and the D55 motorway in the west, and with Vsetín and the Czech–Slovak border in Střelná in the east.

The Zlín is located on the railway line Otrokovice–Vizovice. There are nine stations on this line within the city of Zlín, the largest of which is Zlín střed.

== Education ==
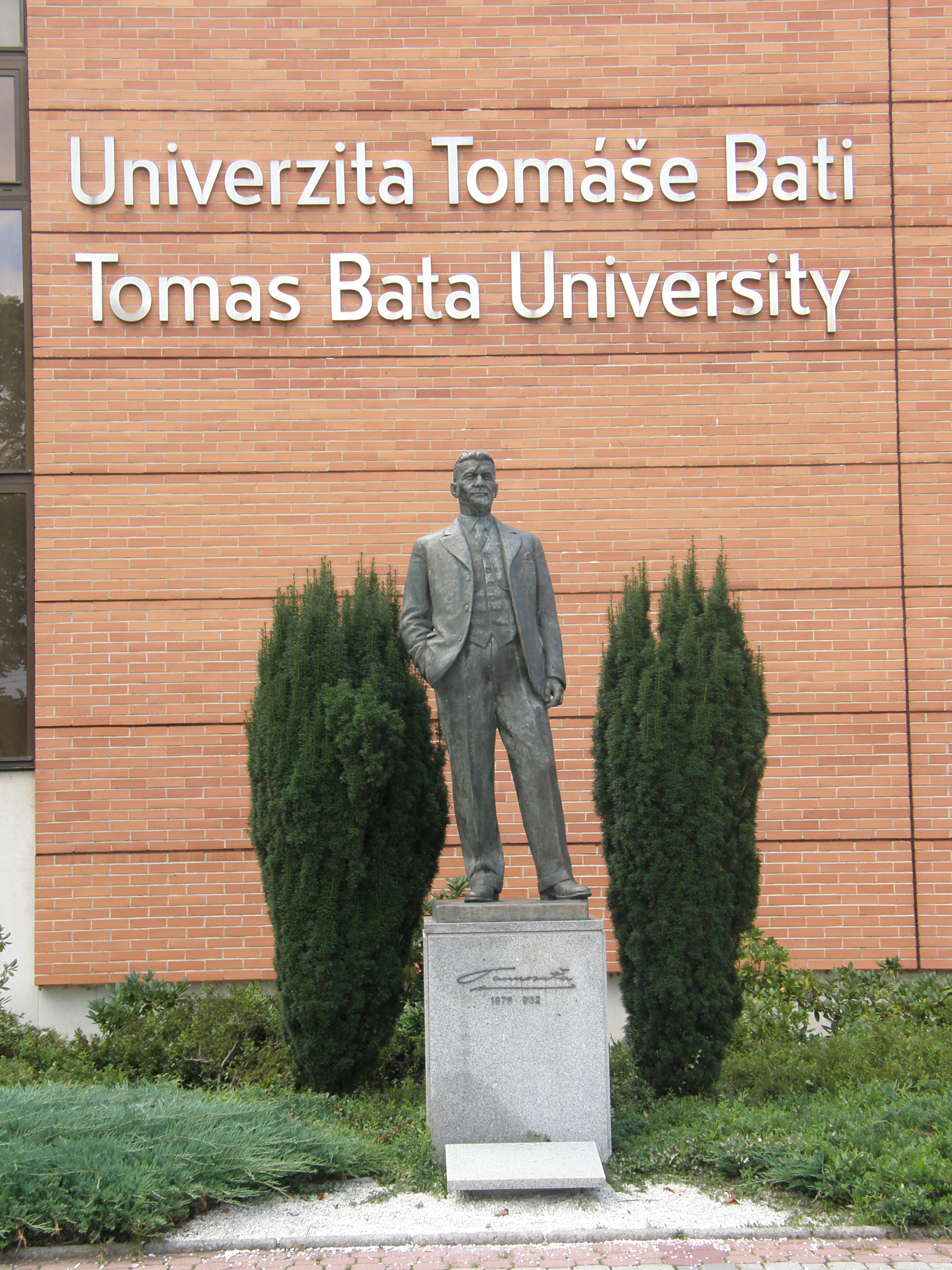
Tomas Bata University

In 1969, the Faculty of Technology was founded here as a branch of the Brno University of Technology. In 2001, it was one of two faculties which formed the newly established Tomas Bata University in Zlín. With more than 9,000 students, it ranks as a medium-sized Czech university. It is formed by six faculties: Technology, Management and Economics, Multimedia Communications, Applied Informatics, Humanities, and Logistics and Crisis Management.

== Culture ==
Zlín is located in the cultural region of Moravian Wallachia near the tripoint of the cultural regions of Moravian Wallachia, Moravian Slovakia and Hanakia.

Given Zlín's history as one of the biggest centres of filmmaking in the Czech Republic, probably the biggest cultural event is the Zlín Film Festival with subtitle "International Film Festival for Children and Youth".

Winter version of international music festival Masters of Rock takes place in Zlín.

Zlín is home to the Bohuslav Martinů Philharmonic Orchestra; its chief conductor is Tomáš Brauner, while its principal guest conductor is Leoš Svárovský.

== Sport ==
Zlín's ice hockey team PSG Berani Zlín plays in the 1st Czech League (2nd tier) and has won national titles in 2004 and in 2014. The association football team FC Zlín plays in the Czech First League, after being promoted from the Czech National Football League (2nd tier) in 2025. The city also has teams in other sports including volleyball, basketball, Czech handball, softball and rugby.

== Architecture ==
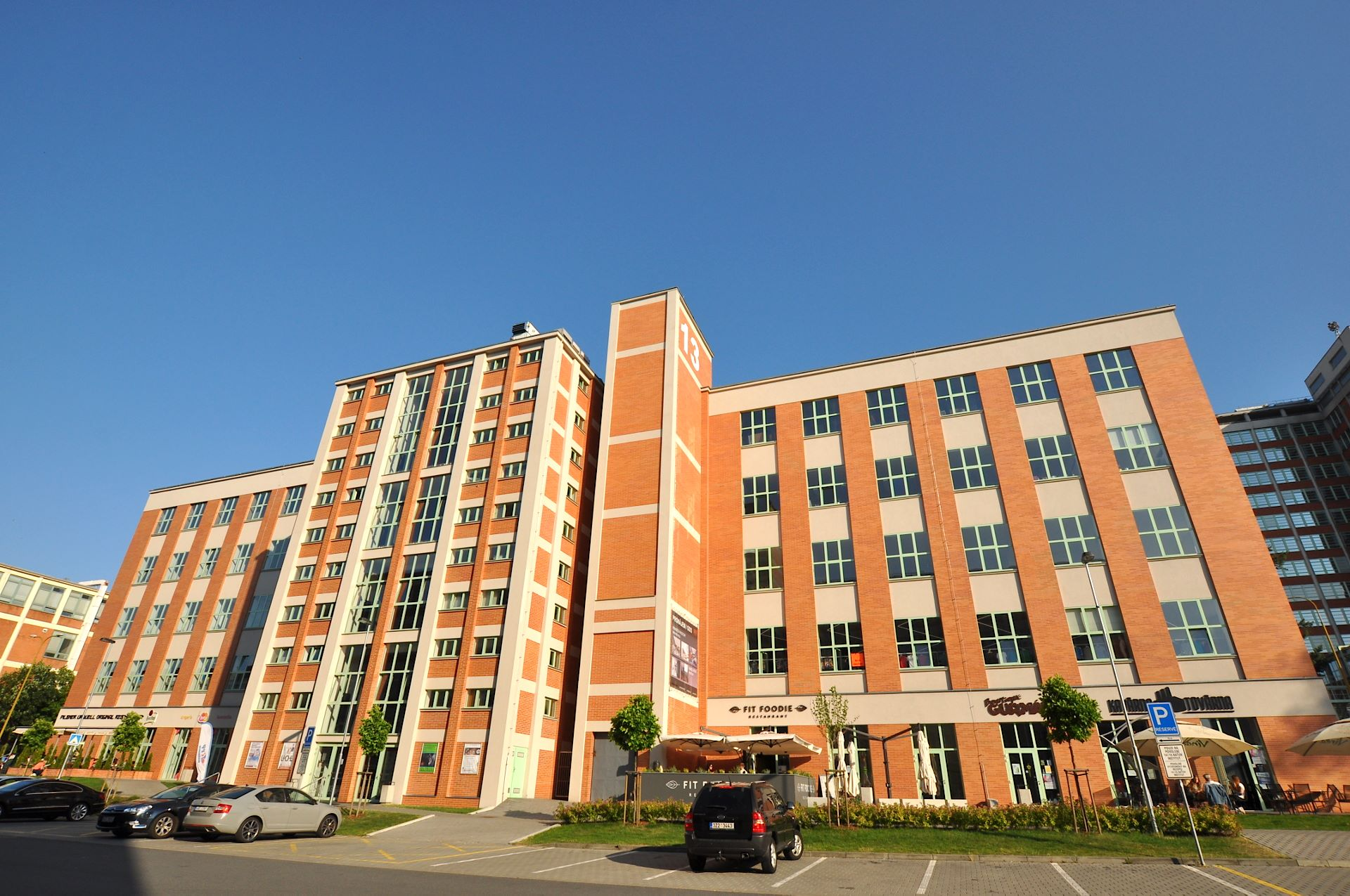
Brownfield reconstruction

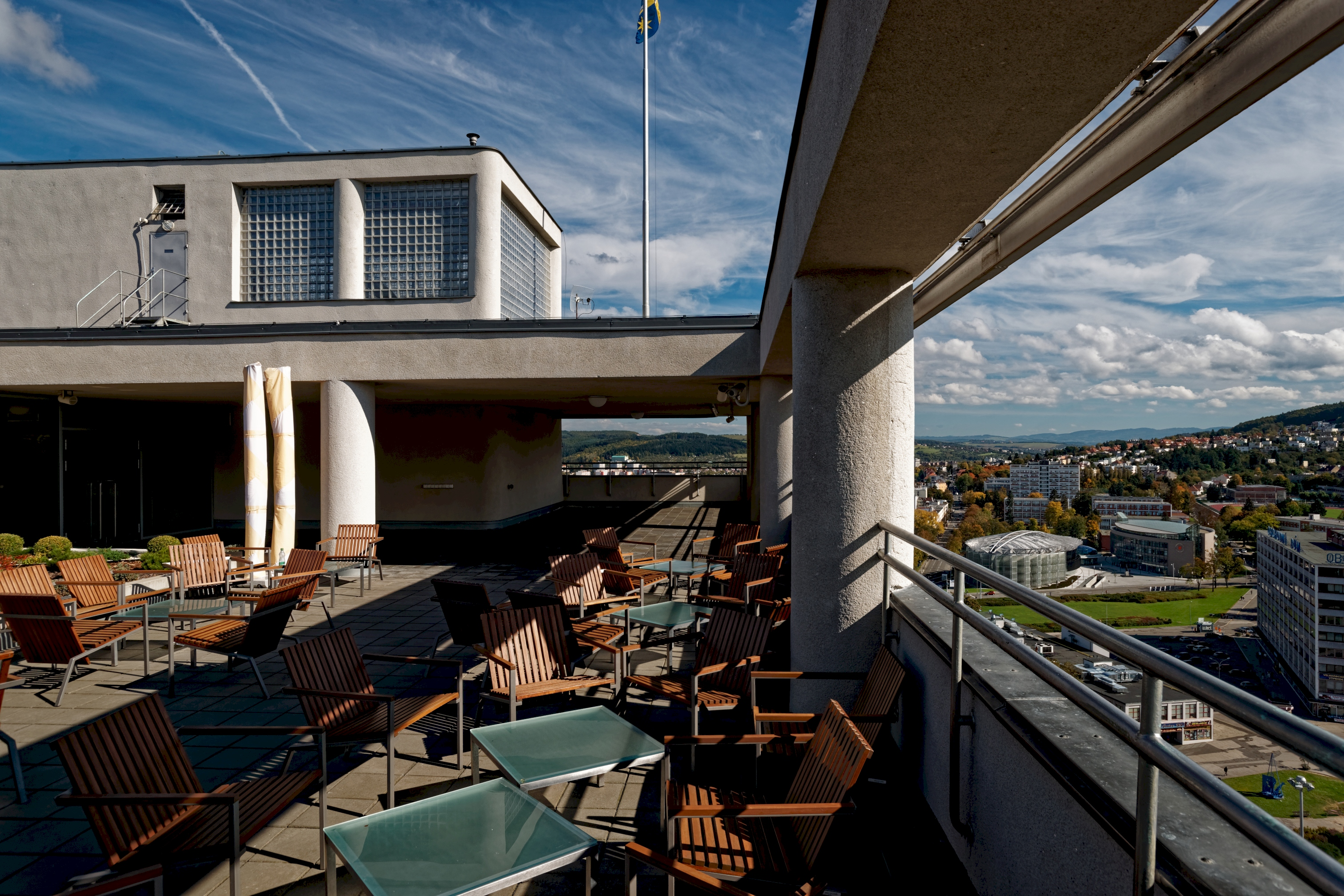
Restaurant on the roof of Baťa's Skyscraper

The city's architectural development was a characteristic synthesis of two modernist urban utopian visions: the first inspired by Ebenezer Howard's Garden city movement and the second tracing its lineage to Le Corbusier's vision of urban modernity. From the very beginning Baťa pursued the goal of constructing the Garden City proposed by Ebenezer Howard. However, the shape of the city had to be 'modernised' so as to suit the needs of the company and of the expanding community. The urban plan of Zlín was the creation of František Lydie Gahura, a student at Le Corbusier's atelier in Paris.

== Sights ==
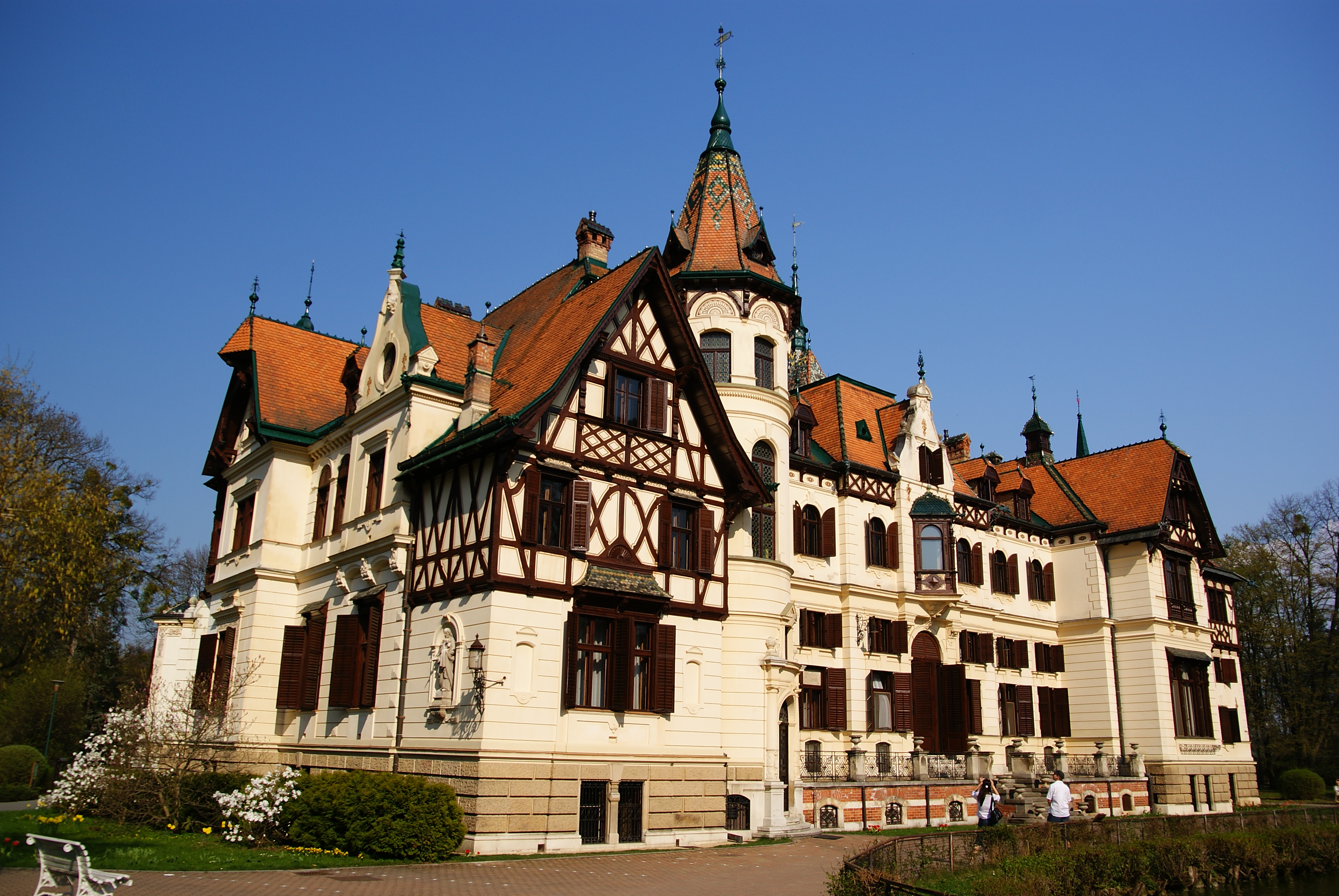
Lešná Castle

The Villa of Tomáš Baťa was an early architectural achievement. The construction was completed in 1911. The building's design was carried out by the architect Jan Kotěra. After its confiscation in 1946, the building served as a Pionýr' house. Being returned to Tomáš J. Baťa, the son of the company's founder, the building now houses the headquarters of the Thomas Bata Foundation.

Baťa's Hospital was founded in 1927 and quickly developed into one of the most modern hospitals in Central Europe. The original architectural set up was designed by F. L. Gahura.

The Grand Cinema was designed by the architect F. L. Gahura and built in 1932. This technological marvel became the largest cinema in Central Europe in its time with a capacity of 2,270 seated viewers. Today it has 1,010 seats.

Tomas Bata Memorial was built in 1933 by F. L. Gahura. The original purpose of the building was to commemorate the achievements of Baťa. The building itself is a Constructivist masterpiece. It has served as the seat of the Bohuslav Martinů Philharmonic Orchestra since 1955.

Baťa's Skyscraper was built as the headquarters for the worldwide Baťa organisation. Designed by Vladimír Karfík, the huge building was erected in 1936–1939. It included a room-sized elevator housing the office for the boss, comfortably furnished – with a sink, a telephone, and air conditioning. When it was built it was the tallest Czechoslovak building at 77.5 m (254 ft). After a costly reconstruction in 2004, it became the seat of the Regional Office of the Zlín Region and the headquarters of the tax office.

The Lešná Castle is located in the village of Štípa. It was built in the Neo-Gothic, Neo-Renaissance and Neo-Baroque styles in 1887–1893. It is one of the youngest aristocratic residences in Moravia. The castle was built for the Seilern-Aspang family on the site of an older castle from the 18th century. Today the castle is open to the public and there are collections of unique and historically valuable objects. The castle is located inside the Zlín-Lešná Zoo complex. It is the second most-visited zoo in the country, and as of 2022, it was overall the third most visited tourist destination in the country.

The Malenovice Castle is located in Malenovice. It was founded in the second half of the 14th century. The Gothic castle was modified in the Renaissance style in the following centuries. Today part of the castle is open to the public and contains several expositions.

== Notable people ==
- Tomáš Baťa (1876–1932), industrialist, founder of Bata Corporation
- Miloslav Petrusek (1936–2012), sociologist
- John Tusa (born 1936), British arts administrator, and radio and television journalist
- Tom Stoppard (1937–2025), British playwright and screenwriter
- Josef Abrhám (1939–2022), actor
- Eva Jiřičná (born 1939), architect
- Ivana Trump (1949–2022), Czech-American businesswoman and model
- Vladimír Hučín (born 1952), dissident and political celebrity
- Stanislava Nopová (born 1953), author, poet and publisher
- Bohumil Brhel (born 1965), speedway rider
- Roman Čechmánek (1971–2023), ice hockey player
- Tomáš Dvořák (born 1972), decathlete, Olympic medalist
- Daniel Málek (born 1973), breaststroke swimmer
- Roman Hamrlík (born 1974), ice hockey player
- Petr Čajánek (born 1975), ice hockey player
- Mojmír Hampl (born 1975), economist
- Petr Janda (born 1975), architect
- Jiří Novák (born 1975), tennis player
- Jan Zakopal (born 1977), footballer
- Karel Rachůnek (1979–2011), ice hockey player
- Roman Macek (born 1997), footballer

== Twin towns – sister cities ==
Zlín is twinned with:

- Altenburg, Germany
- Chorzów, Poland
- Groningen, Netherlands
- Izegem, Belgium
- Limbach-Oberfrohna, Germany
- Möhlin, Switzerland
- Partizánske, Slovakia
- Romans-sur-Isère, France
- Sesto San Giovanni, Italy
- Trenčín, Slovakia

Zlín also cooperates with Turin, Italy.

== Gallery ==
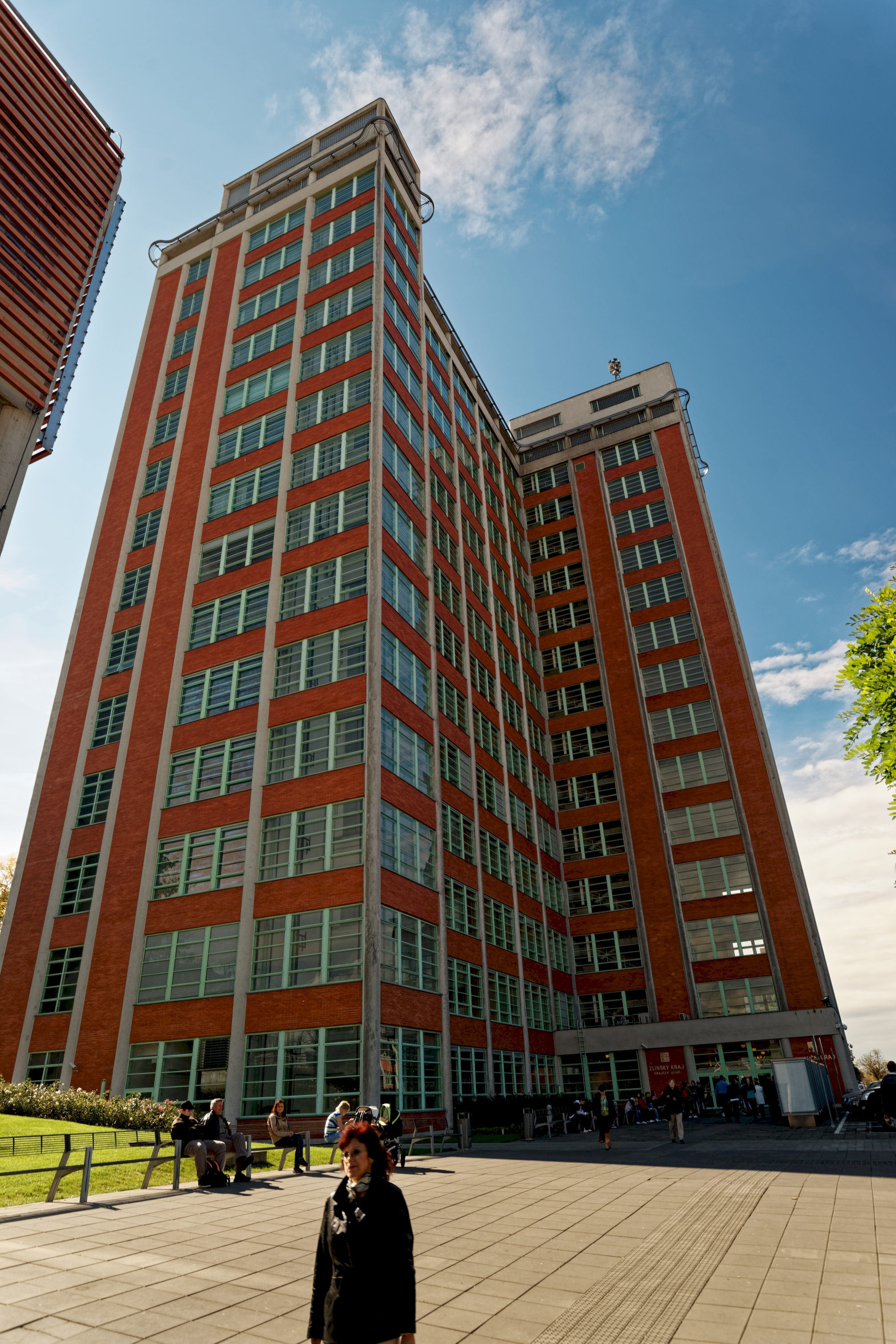
Baťa's Skyscraper

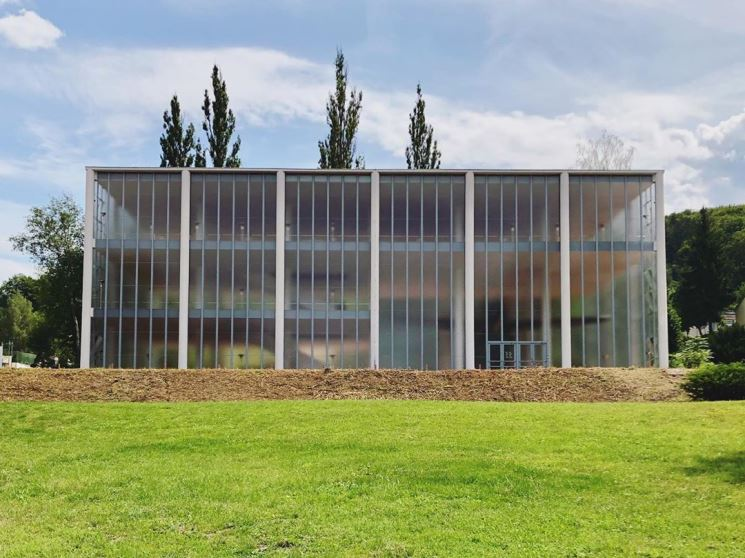
Tomas Bata Memorial

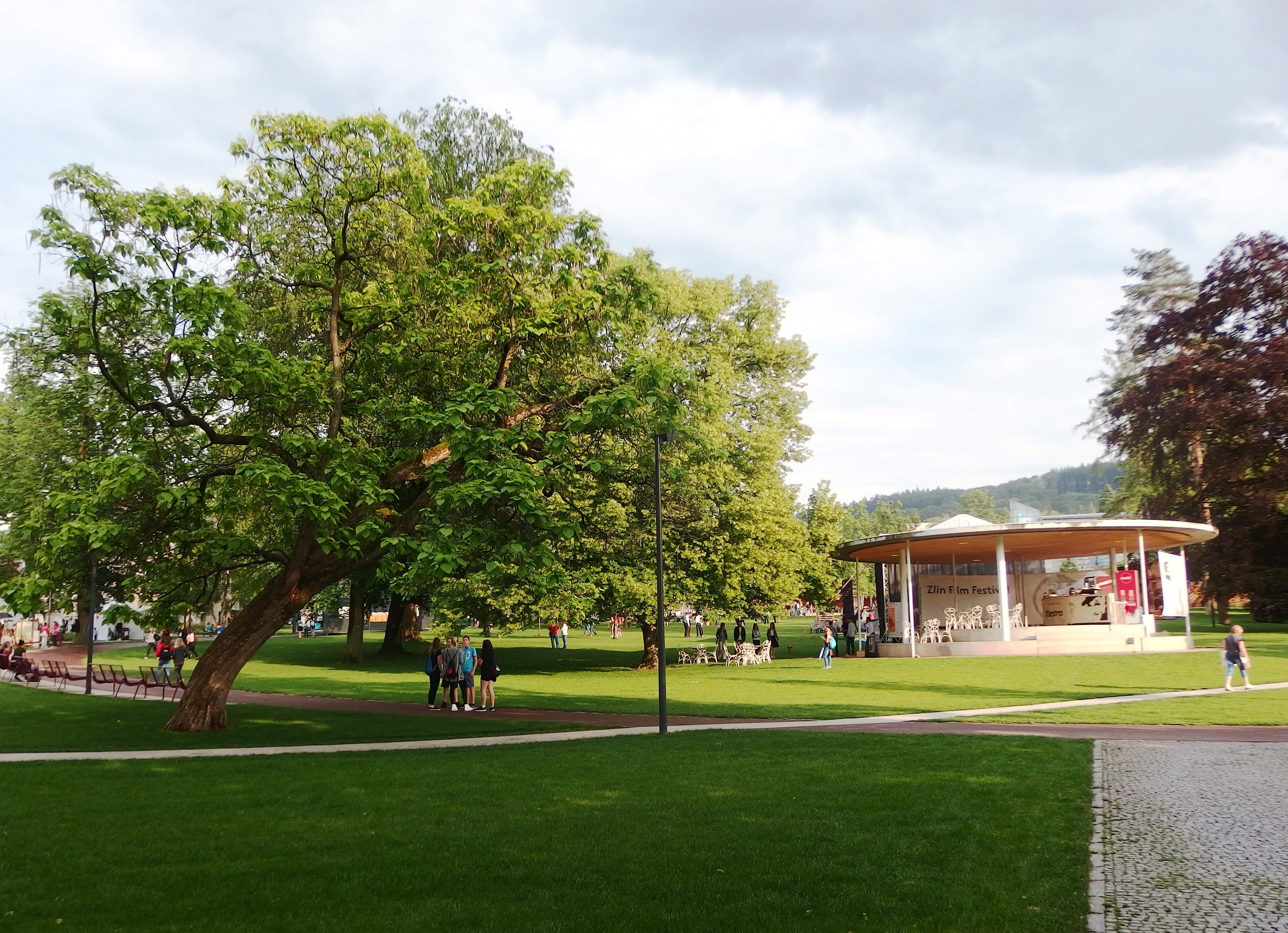
Komenského Park

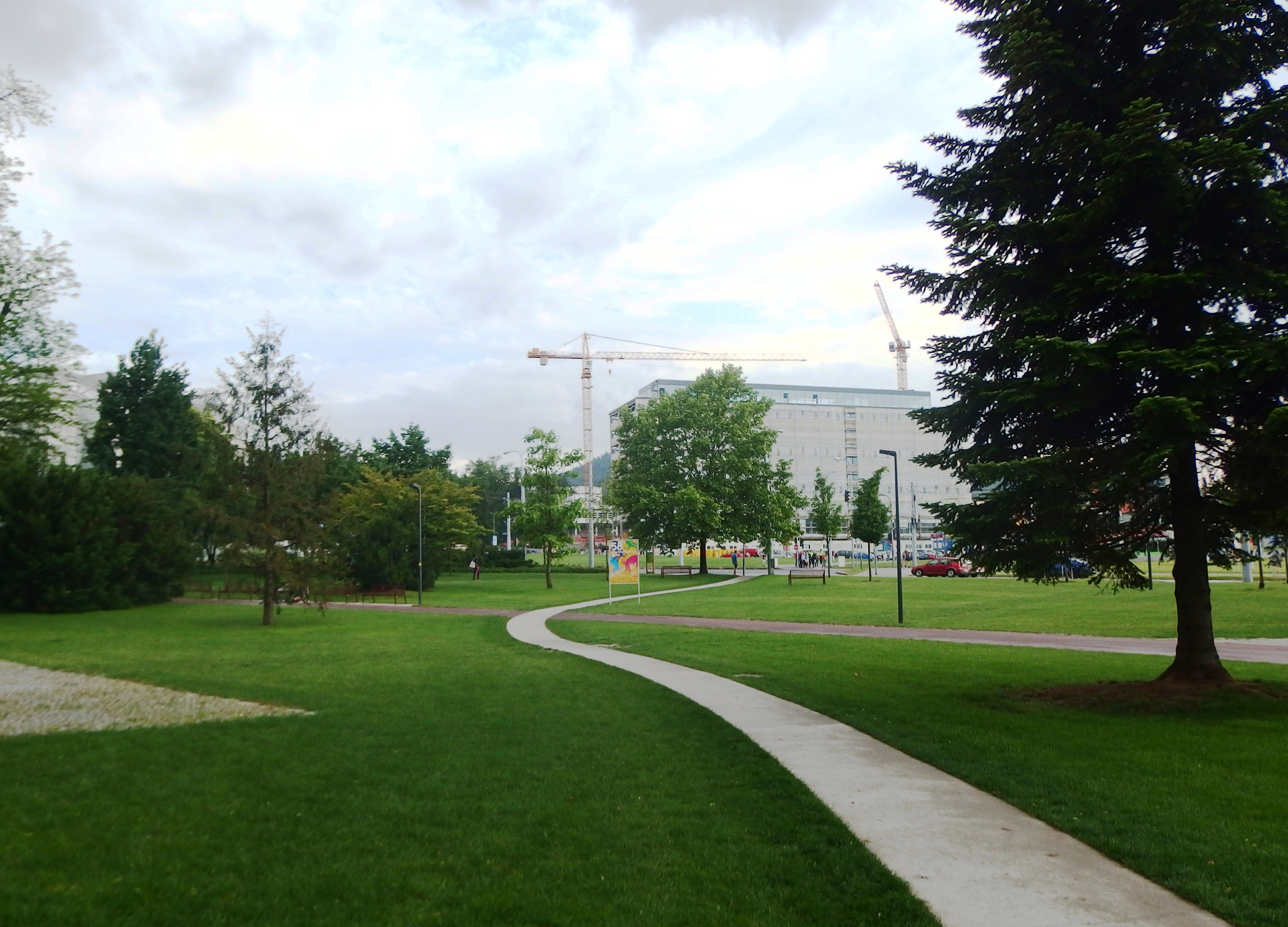
Komenského Park

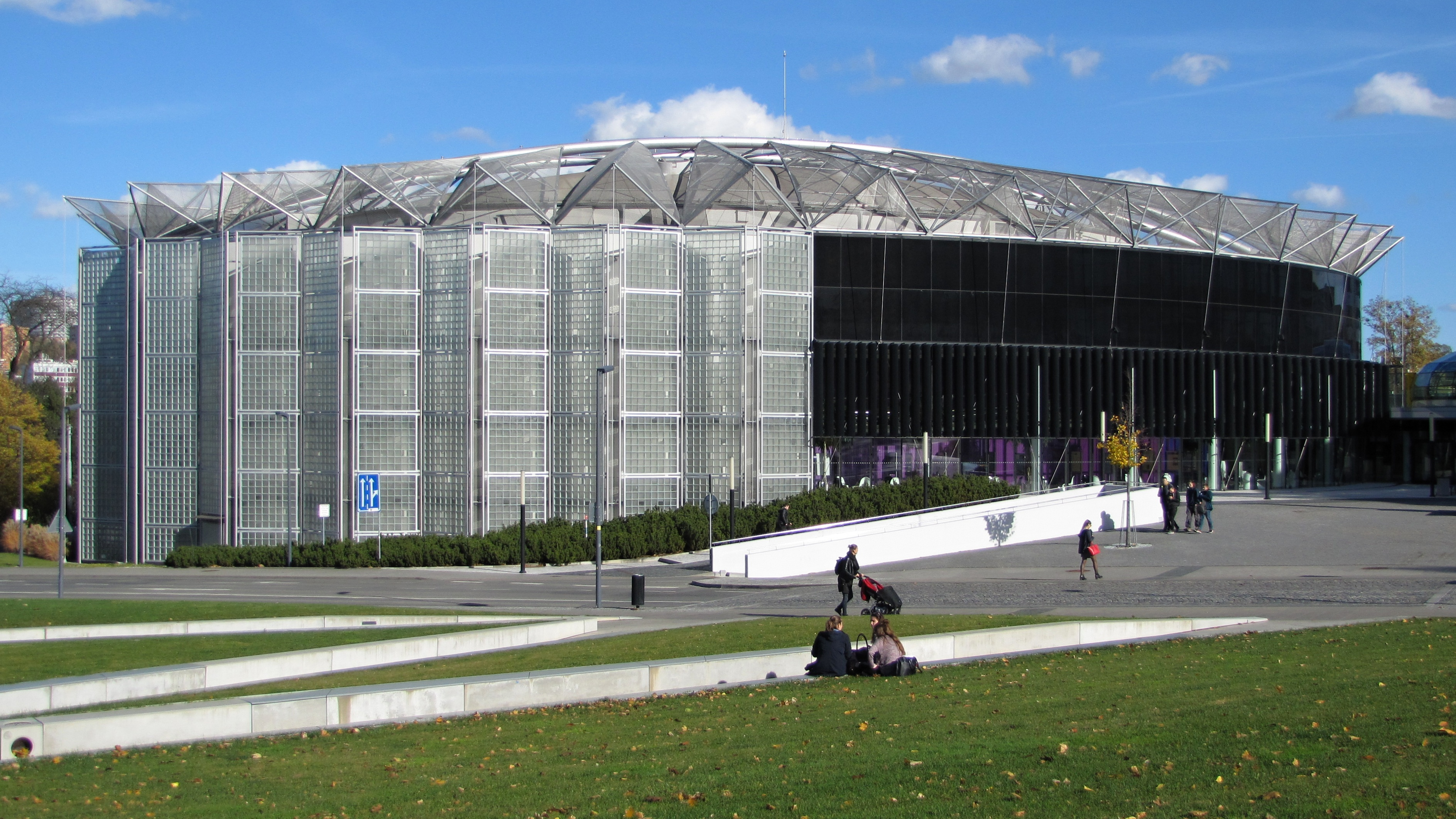
Congress Centre Zlín

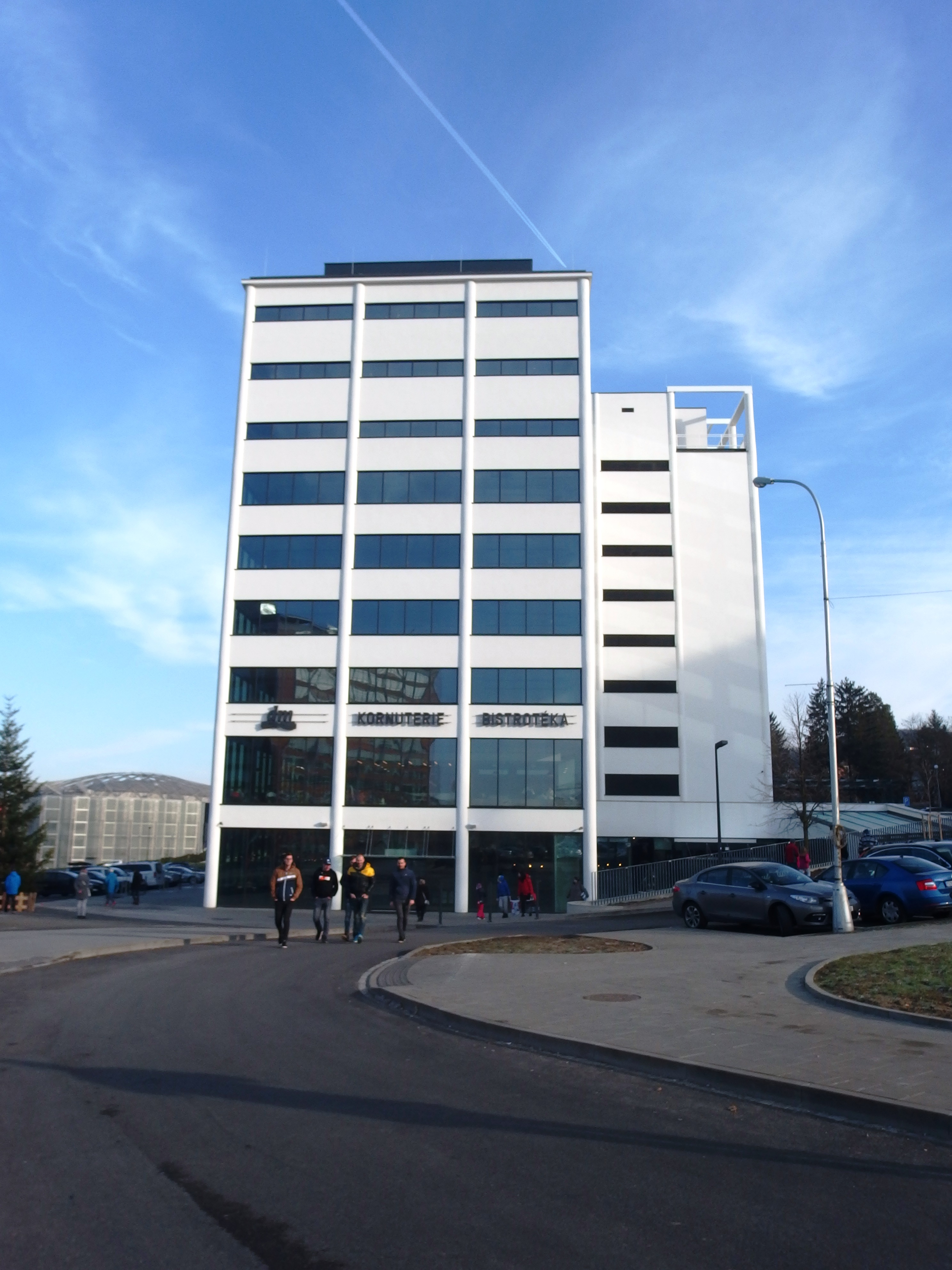
Prior Zlín, a department store
