= Dobrkovice =

- Municipality
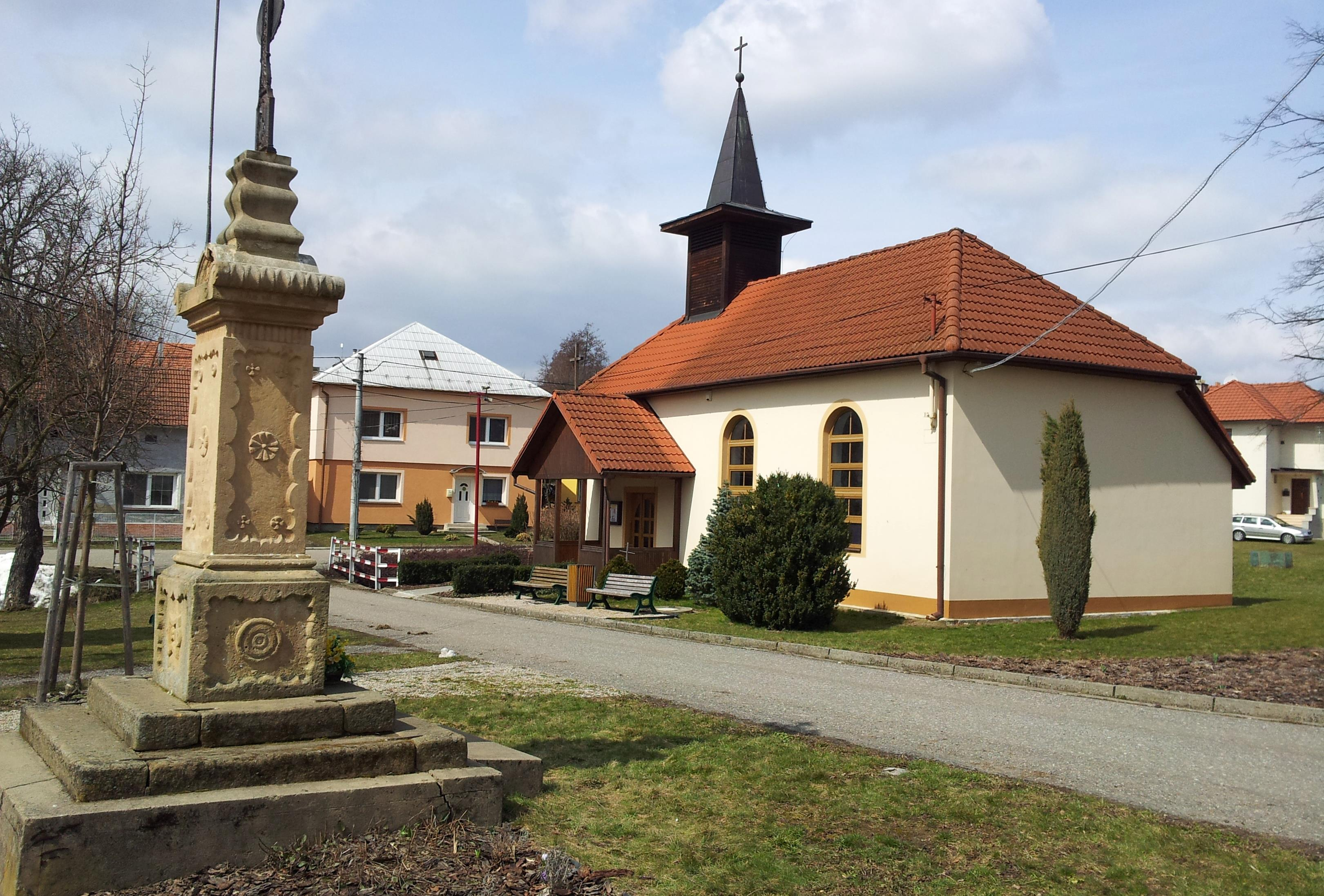
- Chapel of the Virgin Mary, Help of Christians

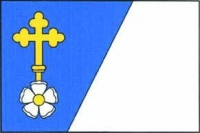
- Flag Coat of arms

- Location in the Czech Republic
- Coordinates: 49°5′40″N 17°40′10″E
- Country: Czech Republic
- Region: Zlín
- District: Zlín
- First mentioned: 1360

Area
  - Total: 4.33 km^{2} (1.67 sq mi)
- Elevation: 276 m (906 ft)

Population (2026-01-01)
  - Total: 257
  - Density: 59.4/km^{2} (154/sq mi)
- Time zone: UTC+1 (CET)
  - Summer (DST): UTC+2 (CEST)
- Postal code: 763 07
- Website: www.dobrkovice.cz

Dobrkovice is a municipality and village in Zlín District in the Zlín Region of the Czech Republic. It has about 300 inhabitants.

Dobrkovice lies approximately 16 kilometres (10 mi) south of Zlín and 260 km (160 mi) south-east of Prague.

== Demographics ==
Historical population
Year	Pop.	±%
1869	223	—
1880	264	+18.4%
1890	259	−1.9%
1900	294	+13.5%
1910	322	+9.5%
1921	330	+2.5%
1930	302	−8.5%
1950	342	+13.2%
1961	366	+7.0%
1970	357	−2.5%
1980	329	−7.8%
1991	315	−4.3%
2001	278	−11.7%
2011	253	−9.0%
2021	223	−11.9%
Source: Censuses
