= Karlovice (Zlín District) =

- Municipality
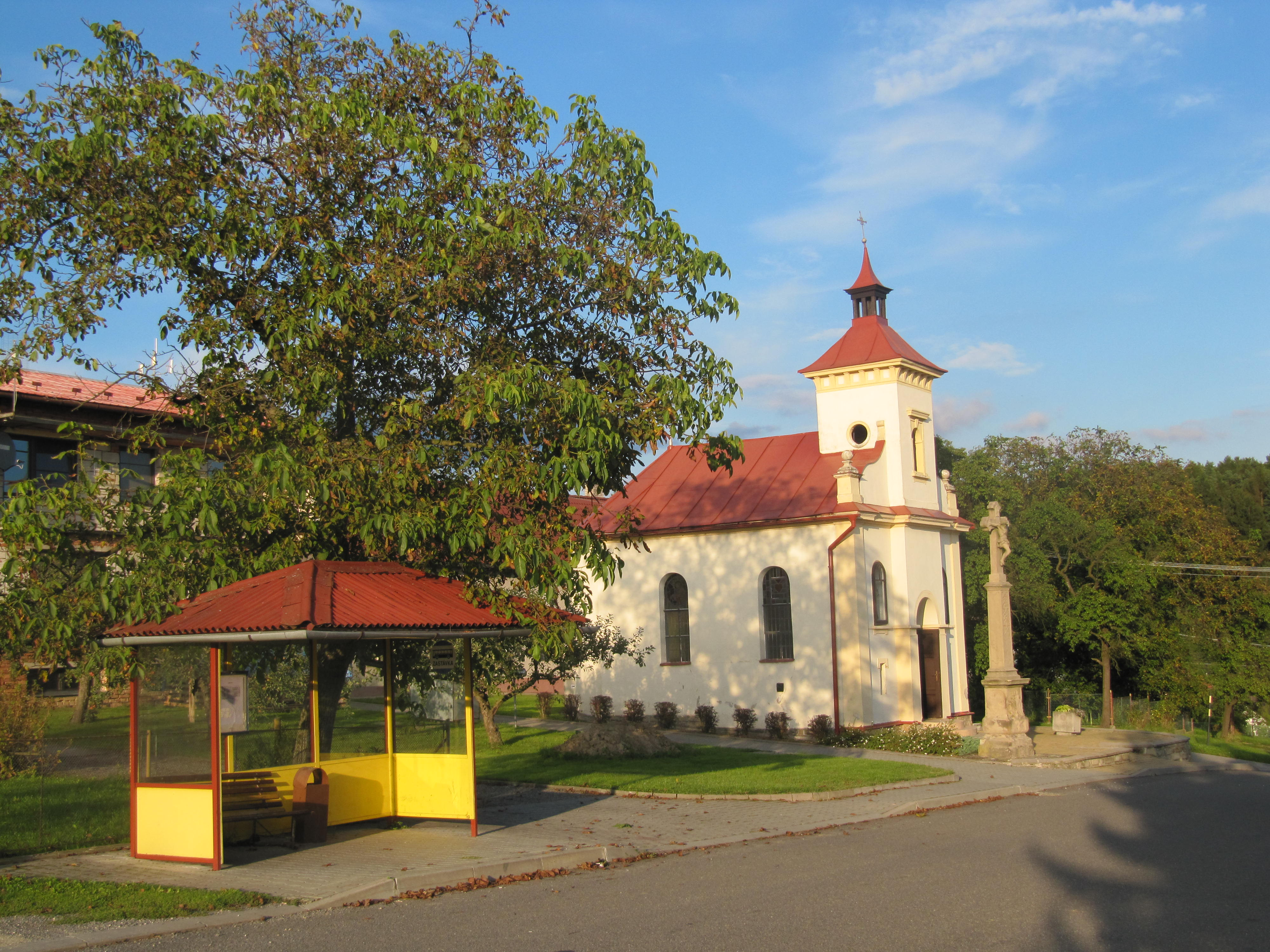
- Chapel of the Virgin Mary

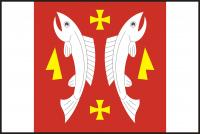
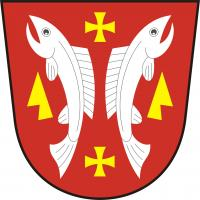
- Flag Coat of arms

- Location in the Czech Republic
- Coordinates: 49°10′35″N 17°35′9″E
- Country: Czech Republic
- Region: Zlín
- District: Zlín
- Founded: 1769

Area
  - Total: 2.08 km^{2} (0.80 sq mi)
- Elevation: 315 m (1,033 ft)

Population (2026-01-01)
  - Total: 229
  - Density: 110/km^{2} (285/sq mi)
- Time zone: UTC+1 (CET)
  - Summer (DST): UTC+2 (CEST)
- Postal code: 763 02
- Website: www.obeckarlovice.eu

Karlovice is a municipality and village in Zlín District in the Zlín Region of the Czech Republic. It has about 200 inhabitants.

Karlovice lies approximately 9 kilometres (6 mi) south-west of Zlín and 250 km (160 mi) south-east of Prague.

== Demographics ==
Historical population
Year	Pop.	±%
1869	198	—
1880	231	+16.7%
1890	232	+0.4%
1900	250	+7.8%
1910	222	−11.2%
1921	216	−2.7%
1930	230	+6.5%
1950	258	+12.2%
1961	305	+18.2%
1970	273	−10.5%
1980	263	−3.7%
1991	214	−18.6%
2001	210	−1.9%
2011	232	+10.5%
2021	236	+1.7%
Source: Censuses
