= Všemina =

- Municipality
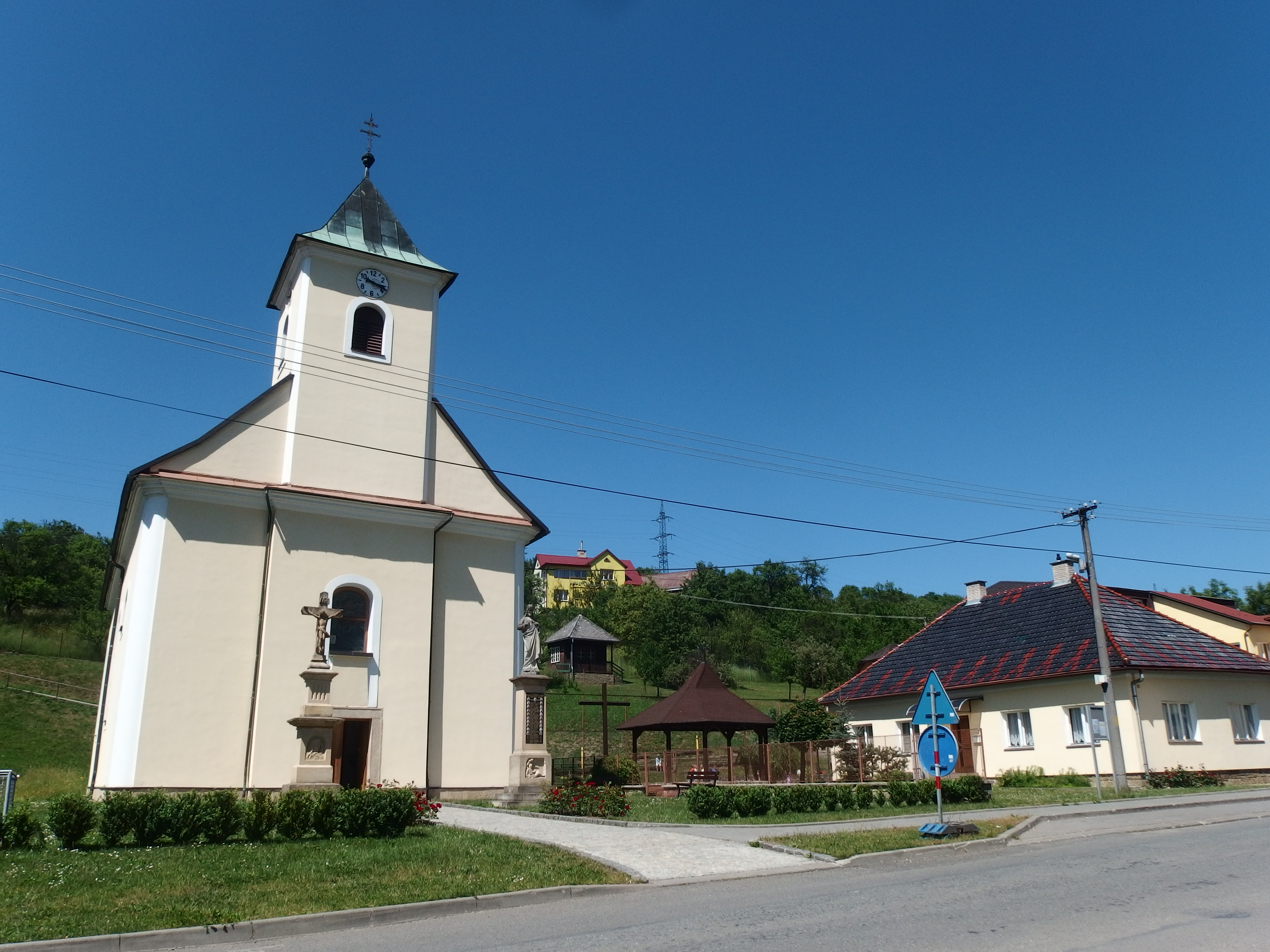
- Church of Saint John of Nepomuk

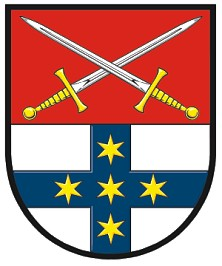
- Flag Coat of arms

- Location in the Czech Republic
- Coordinates: 49°16′52″N 17°52′37″E
- Country: Czech Republic
- Region: Zlín
- District: Zlín
- First mentioned: 1373

Area
  - Total: 11.65 km^{2} (4.50 sq mi)
- Elevation: 370 m (1,210 ft)

Population (2026-01-01)
  - Total: 1,141
  - Density: 97.94/km^{2} (253.7/sq mi)
- Time zone: UTC+1 (CET)
  - Summer (DST): UTC+2 (CEST)
- Postal code: 763 15
- Website: obecvsemina.eu

Všemina is a municipality and village in Zlín District in the Zlín Region of the Czech Republic. It has about 1,100 inhabitants.

Všemina lies approximately 16 kilometres (10 mi) east of Zlín and 265 km (165 mi) east of Prague.

== Demographics ==
Historical population
| Year | Pop. | ±% |
|---|---|---|
| 1869 | 810 | — |
| 1880 | 866 | +6.9% |
| 1890 | 829 | −4.3% |
| 1900 | 816 | −1.6% |
| 1910 | 878 | +7.6% |
| 1921 | 809 | −7.9% |
| 1930 | 810 | +0.1% |
| 1950 | 1,005 | +24.1% |
| 1961 | 1,086 | +8.1% |
| 1970 | 1,069 | −1.6% |
| 1980 | 1,042 | −2.5% |
| 1991 | 1,054 | +1.2% |
| 2001 | 1,049 | −0.5% |
| 2011 | 1,107 | +5.5% |
| 2021 | 1,097 | −0.9% |
Source: Censuses
