= Nedašova Lhota =

- Municipality
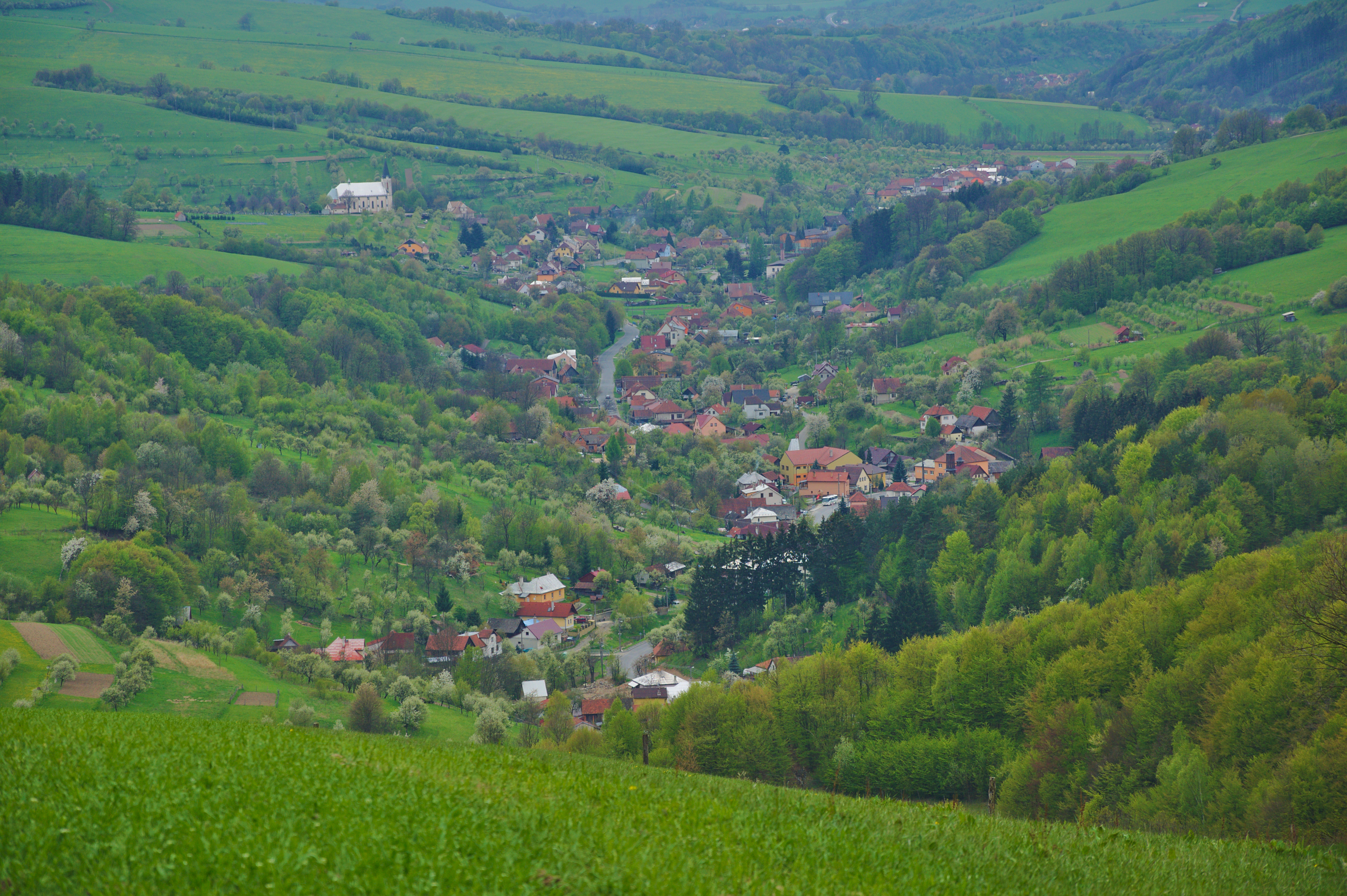
- View from the hill Pasecké lazy

- Flag Coat of arms

- Location in the Czech Republic
- Coordinates: 49°7′17″N 18°4′47″E
- Country: Czech Republic
- Region: Zlín
- District: Zlín
- First mentioned: 1503

Area
  - Total: 9.33 km^{2} (3.60 sq mi)
- Elevation: 410 m (1,350 ft)

Population (2026-01-01)
  - Total: 676
  - Density: 72.5/km^{2} (188/sq mi)
- Time zone: UTC+1 (CET)
  - Summer (DST): UTC+2 (CEST)
- Postal code: 763 32
- Website: www.nedasovalhota.cz

Nedašova Lhota is a municipality and village in Zlín District in the Zlín Region of the Czech Republic. It has about 700 inhabitants.

Nedašova Lhota lies approximately 33 kilometres (21 mi) east of Zlín and 286 km (178 mi) east of Prague.

== Demographics ==
Historical population
| Year | Pop. | ±% |
|---|---|---|
| 1869 | 522 | — |
| 1880 | 567 | +8.6% |
| 1890 | 533 | −6.0% |
| 1900 | 539 | +1.1% |
| 1910 | 532 | −1.3% |
| 1921 | 511 | −3.9% |
| 1930 | 562 | +10.0% |
| 1950 | 613 | +9.1% |
| 1961 | 766 | +25.0% |
| 1970 | 742 | −3.1% |
| 1980 | 747 | +0.7% |
| 1991 | 730 | −2.3% |
| 2001 | 735 | +0.7% |
| 2011 | 720 | −2.0% |
| 2021 | 644 | −10.6% |
Source: Censuses
