= Doubravy =

- Municipality
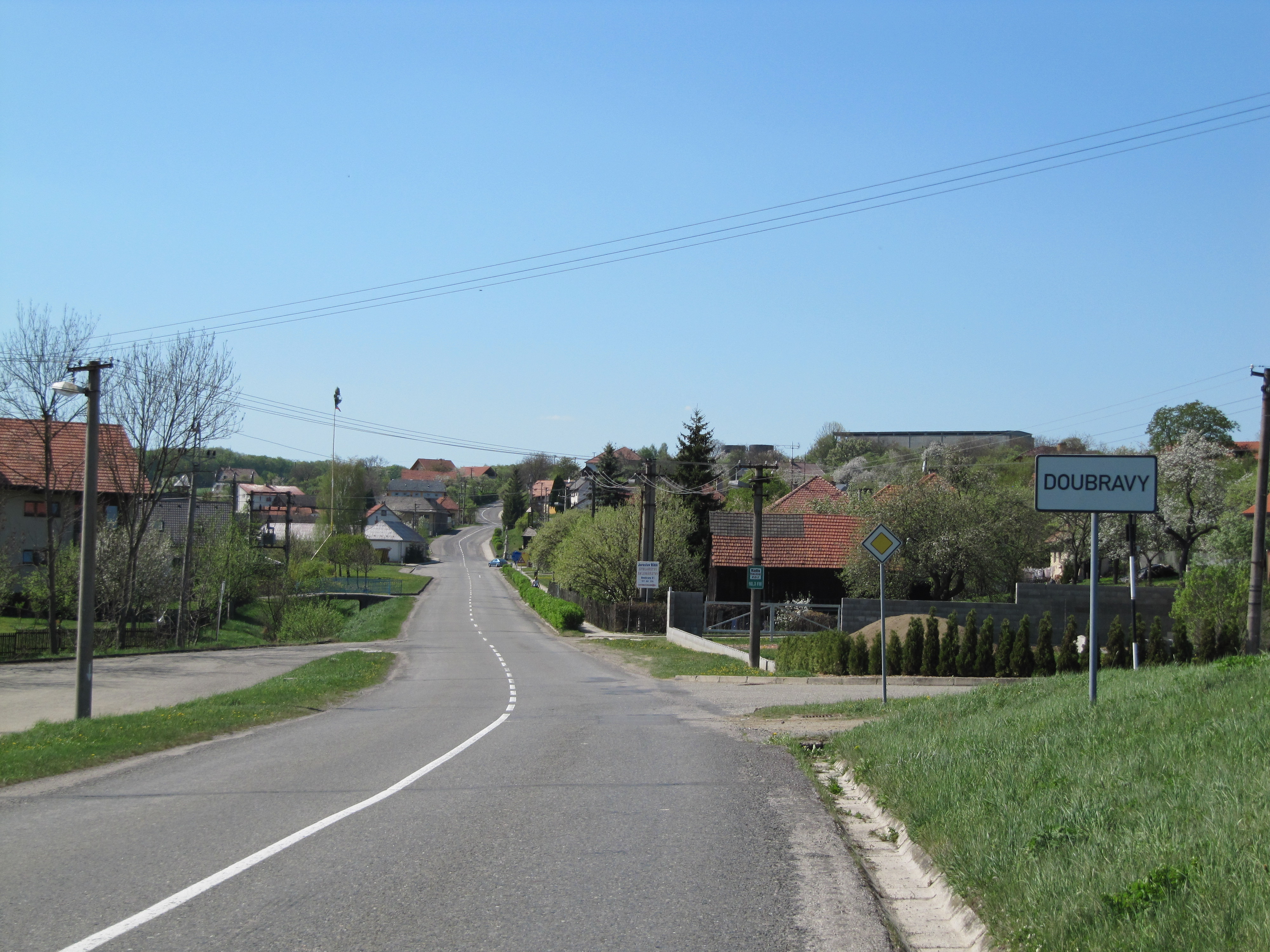
- Main road going through Doubravy

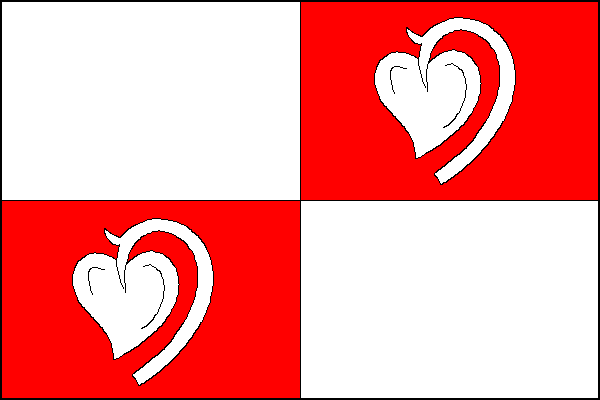
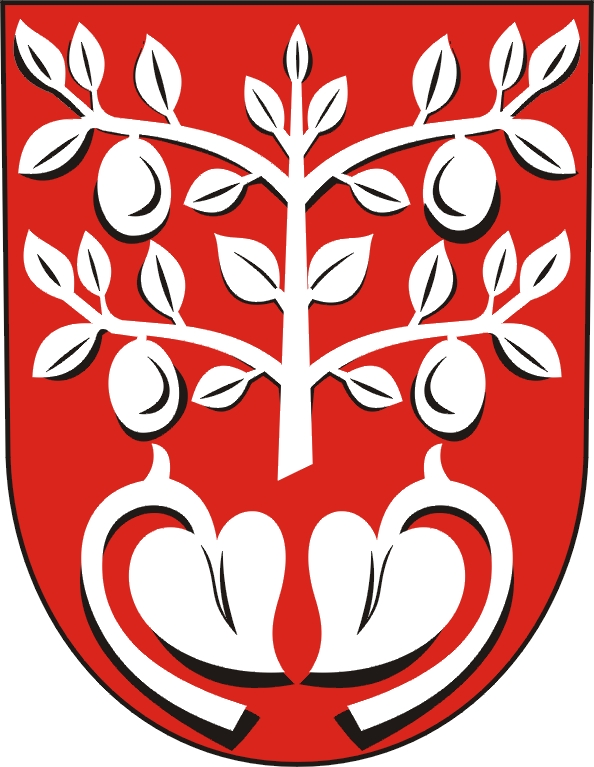
- Flag Coat of arms

- Location in the Czech Republic
- Coordinates: 49°8′33″N 17°40′5″E
- Country: Czech Republic
- Region: Zlín
- District: Zlín
- First mentioned: 1406

Area
  - Total: 10.18 km^{2} (3.93 sq mi)
- Elevation: 337 m (1,106 ft)

Population (2026-01-01)
  - Total: 601
  - Density: 59.0/km^{2} (153/sq mi)
- Time zone: UTC+1 (CET)
  - Summer (DST): UTC+2 (CEST)
- Postal code: 763 45
- Website: doubravy.cz

Doubravy is a municipality and village in Zlín District in the Zlín Region of the Czech Republic. It has about 600 inhabitants.

Doubravy lies approximately 10 kilometres (6 mi) south of Zlín and 257 km (160 mi) south-east of Prague.

== Demographics ==
Historical population
Year	Pop.	±%
1869	416	—
1880	417	+0.2%
1890	430	+3.1%
1900	447	+4.0%
1910	454	+1.6%
1921	465	+2.4%
1930	489	+5.2%
1950	476	−2.7%
1961	535	+12.4%
1970	509	−4.9%
1980	475	−6.7%
1991	462	−2.7%
2001	450	−2.6%
2011	512	+13.8%
2021	578	+12.9%
Source: Censuses
