= Lipová (Zlín District) =

- Municipality
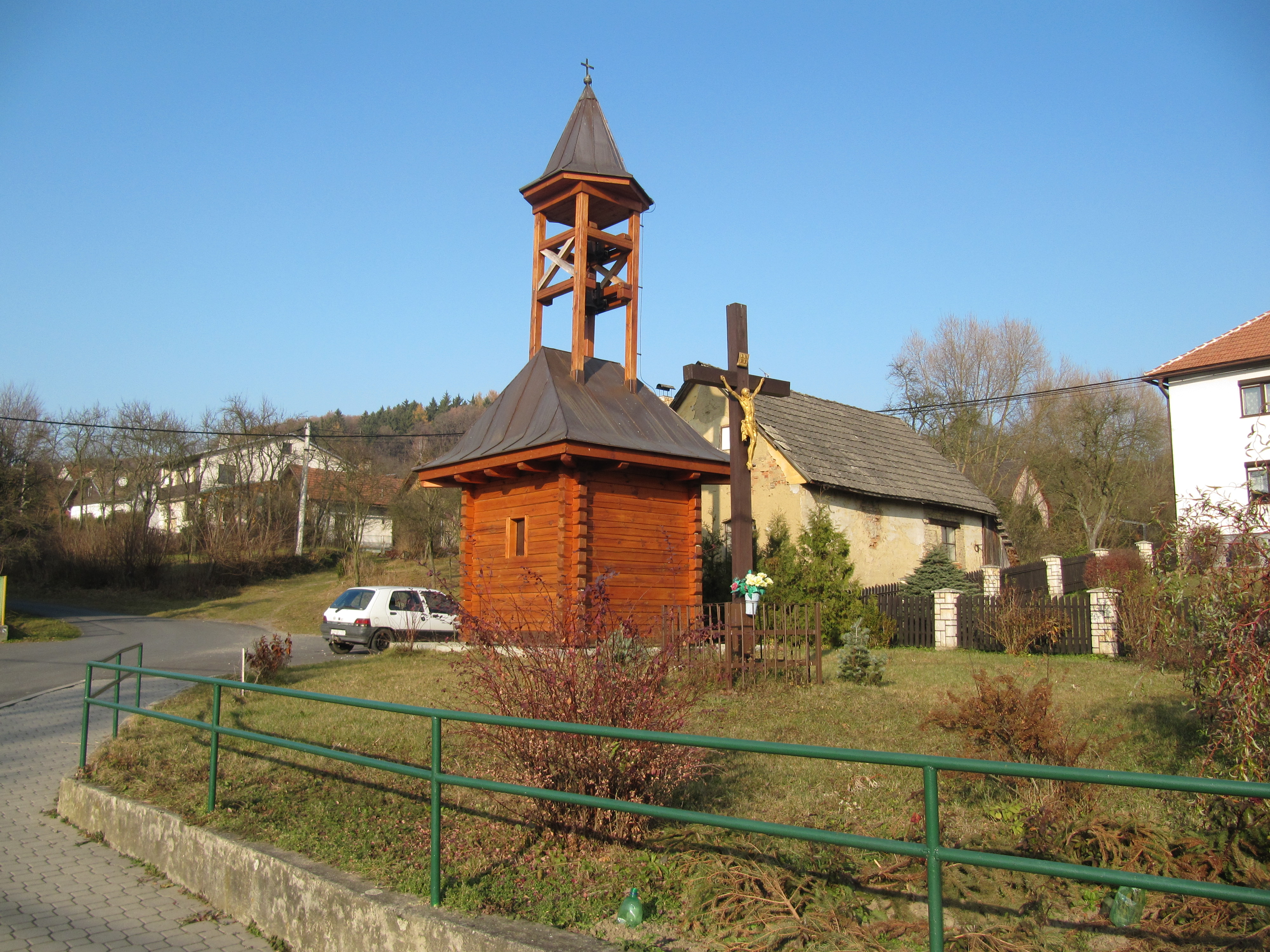
- Modern wooden belfry

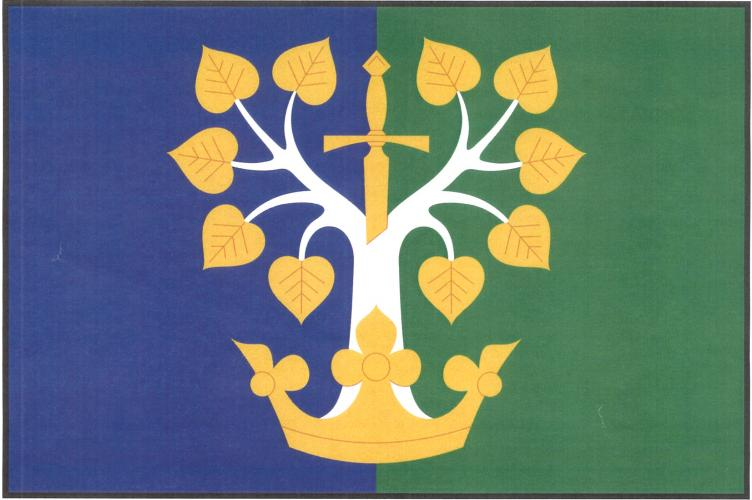
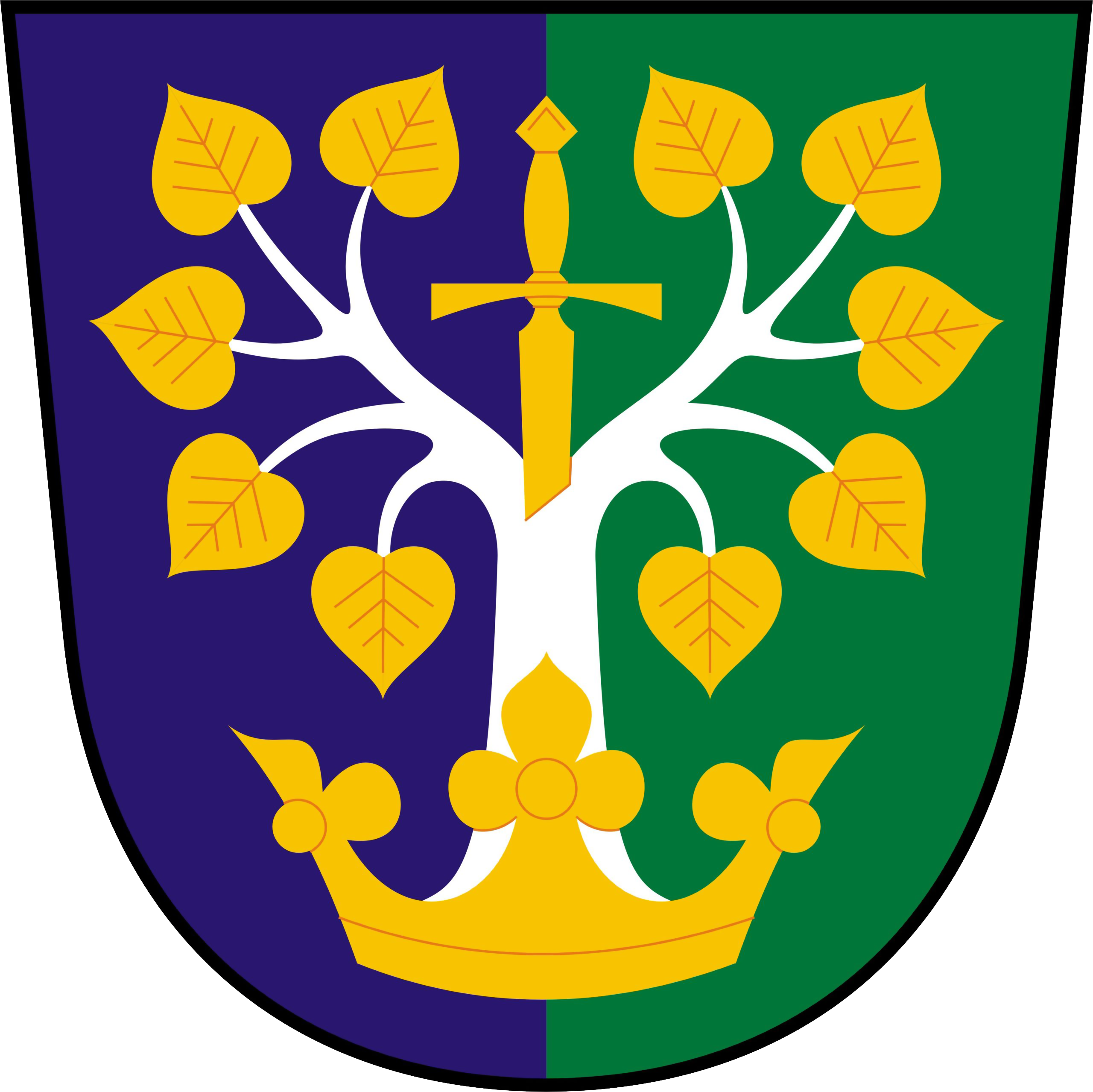
- Flag Coat of arms

- Location in the Czech Republic
- Coordinates: 49°7′19″N 17°52′47″E
- Country: Czech Republic
- Region: Zlín
- District: Zlín
- First mentioned: 1362

Area
  - Total: 11.48 km^{2} (4.43 sq mi)
- Elevation: 427 m (1,401 ft)

Population (2026-01-01)
  - Total: 358
  - Density: 31.2/km^{2} (80.8/sq mi)
- Time zone: UTC+1 (CET)
  - Summer (DST): UTC+2 (CEST)
- Postal code: 763 21
- Website: www.lipova-obec.cz

Lipová is a municipality and village in Zlín District in the Zlín Region of the Czech Republic. It has about 400 inhabitants.

Lipová lies approximately 21 kilometres (13 mi) south-east of Zlín and 272 km (169 mi) south-east of Prague.

== Demographics ==
Historical population
Year	Pop.	±%
1869	386	—
1880	384	−0.5%
1890	444	+15.6%
1900	438	−1.4%
1910	487	+11.2%
1921	479	−1.6%
1930	430	−10.2%
1950	415	−3.5%
1961	423	+1.9%
1970	413	−2.4%
1980	356	−13.8%
1991	313	−12.1%
2001	300	−4.2%
2011	339	+13.0%
2021	336	−0.9%
Source: Censuses
