= Neubuz =

- Municipality
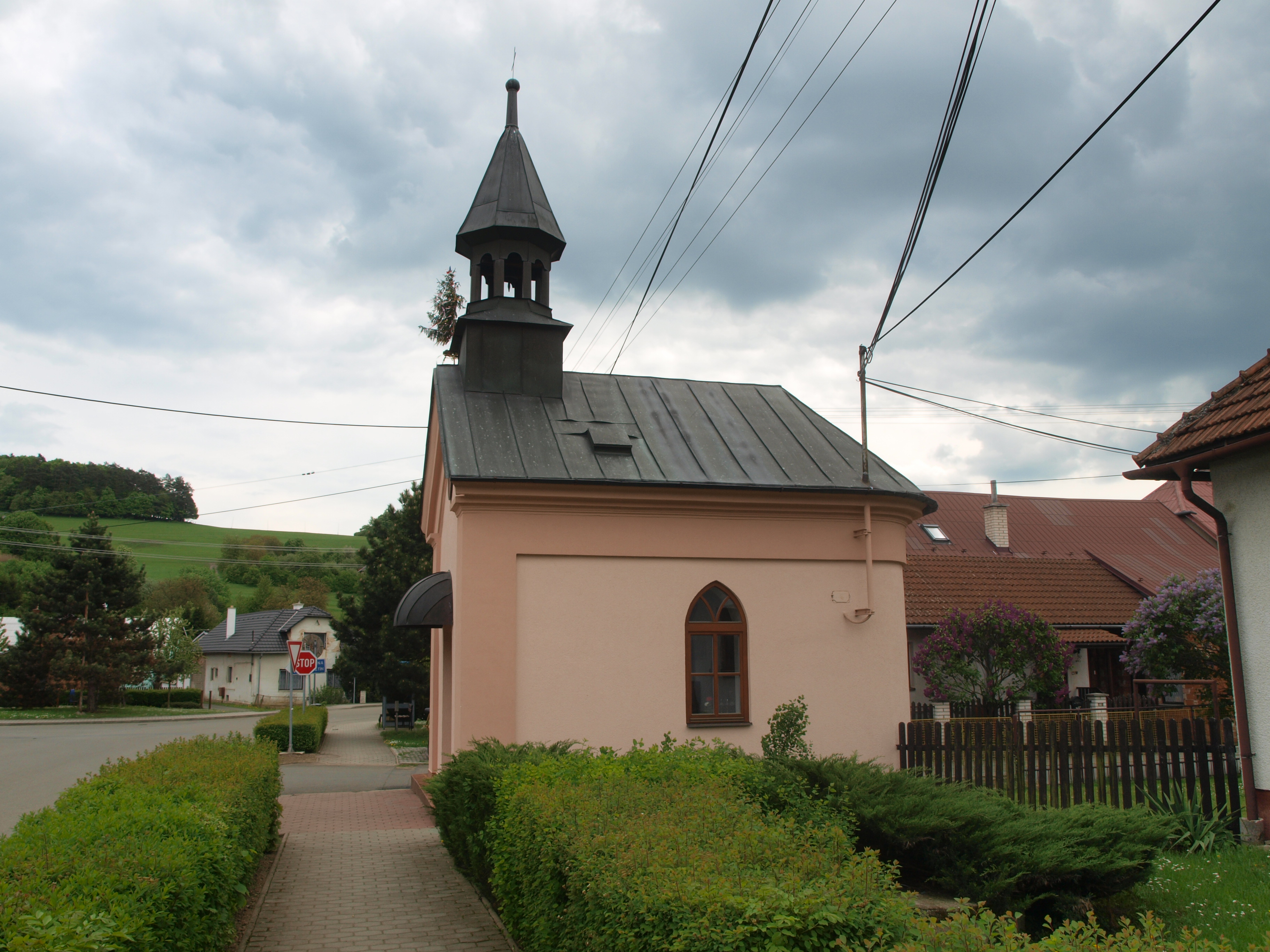
- Chapel of Saint Florian

- Flag Coat of arms

- Location in the Czech Republic
- Coordinates: 49°15′37″N 17°49′31″E
- Country: Czech Republic
- Region: Zlín
- District: Zlín
- First mentioned: 1373

Area
  - Total: 5.40 km^{2} (2.08 sq mi)
- Elevation: 304 m (997 ft)

Population (2026-01-01)
  - Total: 441
  - Density: 81.7/km^{2} (212/sq mi)
- Time zone: UTC+1 (CET)
  - Summer (DST): UTC+2 (CEST)
- Postal code: 763 15
- Website: www.neubuz.cz

Neubuz is a municipality and village in Zlín District in the Zlín Region of the Czech Republic. It has about 400 inhabitants.

Neubuz lies approximately 13 kilometres (8 mi) east of Zlín and 263 km (163 mi) east of Prague.

== Demographics ==
Historical population
Year	Pop.	±%
1869	365	—
1880	374	+2.5%
1890	392	+4.8%
1900	377	−3.8%
1910	420	+11.4%
1921	376	−10.5%
1930	376	+0.0%
1950	385	+2.4%
1961	452	+17.4%
1970	412	−8.8%
1980	421	+2.2%
1991	440	+4.5%
2001	438	−0.5%
2011	448	+2.3%
2021	451	+0.7%
Source: Censuses
