= Rudimov =

- Municipality
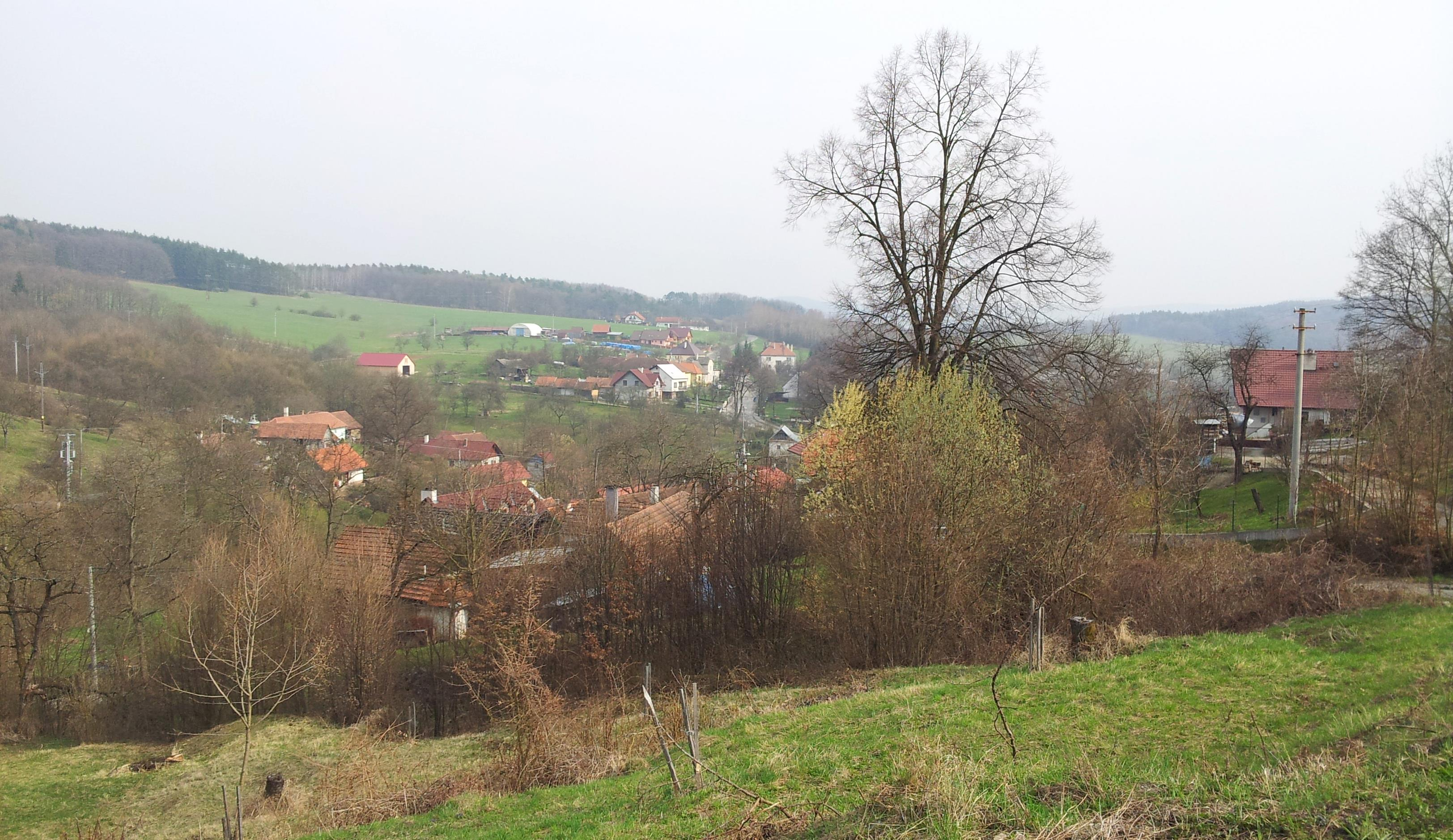
- General view

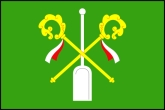
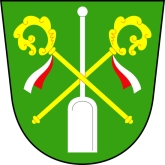
- Flag Coat of arms

- Location in the Czech Republic
- Coordinates: 49°4′47″N 17°49′41″E
- Country: Czech Republic
- Region: Zlín
- District: Zlín
- First mentioned: 1440

Area
  - Total: 10.05 km^{2} (3.88 sq mi)
- Elevation: 370 m (1,210 ft)

Population (2026-01-01)
  - Total: 243
  - Density: 24.2/km^{2} (62.6/sq mi)
- Time zone: UTC+1 (CET)
  - Summer (DST): UTC+2 (CEST)
- Postal code: 763 21
- Website: www.rudimov.cz

Rudimov is a municipality and village in Zlín District in the Zlín Region of the Czech Republic. It has about 200 inhabitants.

Rudimov lies approximately 22 kilometres (14 mi) south-east of Zlín and 271 km (168 mi) south-east of Prague.

== Demographics ==
Historical population
Year	Pop.	±%
1869	492	—
1880	488	−0.8%
1890	503	+3.1%
1900	477	−5.2%
1910	463	−2.9%
1921	437	−5.6%
1930	462	+5.7%
1950	406	−12.1%
1961	433	+6.7%
1970	369	−14.8%
1980	327	−11.4%
1991	267	−18.3%
2001	258	−3.4%
2011	239	−7.4%
2021	244	+2.1%
Source: Censuses
