= Kelníky =

- Municipality
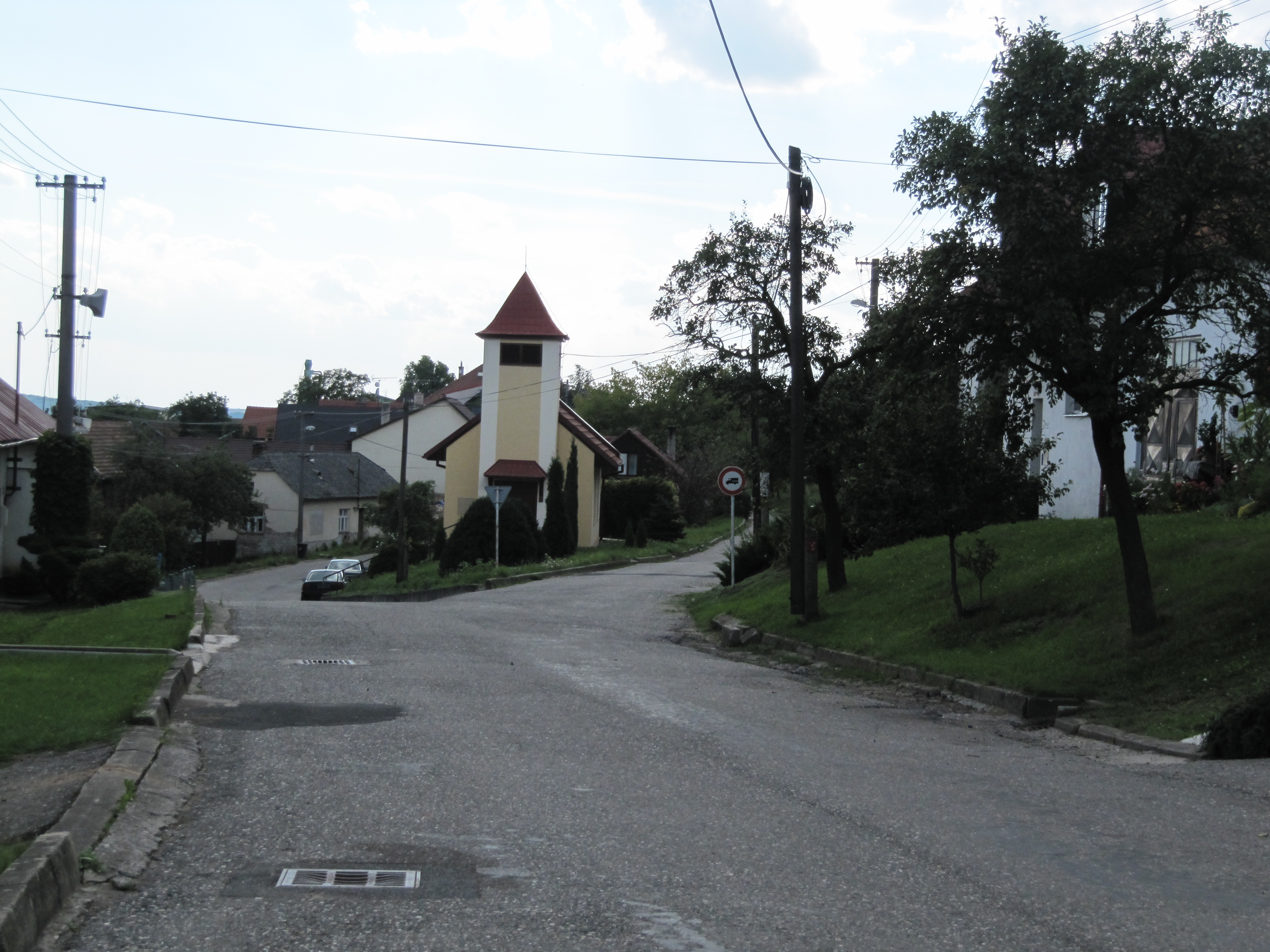
- Chapel of Saint Zdislava

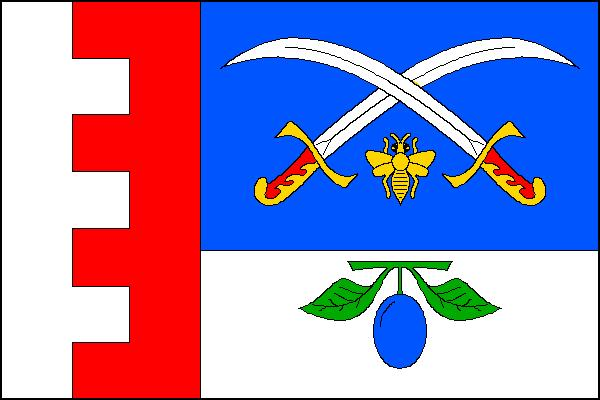
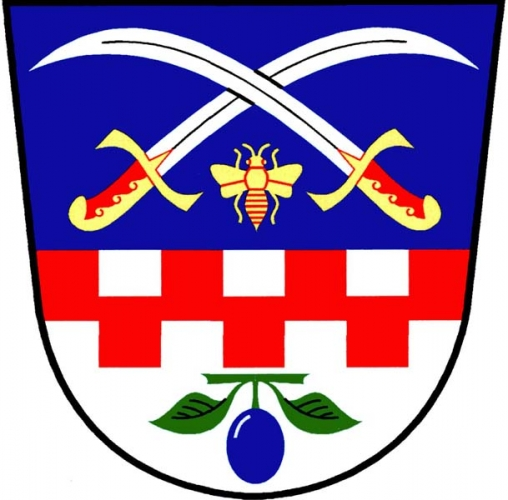
- Flag Coat of arms

- Location in the Czech Republic
- Coordinates: 49°6′39″N 17°38′41″E
- Country: Czech Republic
- Region: Zlín
- District: Zlín
- First mentioned: 1362

Area
  - Total: 3.84 km^{2} (1.48 sq mi)
- Elevation: 337 m (1,106 ft)

Population (2026-01-01)
  - Total: 161
  - Density: 41.9/km^{2} (109/sq mi)
- Time zone: UTC+1 (CET)
  - Summer (DST): UTC+2 (CEST)
- Postal code: 763 07
- Website: www.kelniky.eu

Kelníky is a municipality and village in Zlín District in the Zlín Region of the Czech Republic. It has about 200 inhabitants.

Kelníky lies approximately 13 kilometres (8 mi) south of Zlín and 257 km (160 mi) south-east of Prague.

== Demographics ==
Historical population
Year	Pop.	±%
1869	202	—
1880	210	+4.0%
1890	221	+5.2%
1900	236	+6.8%
1910	239	+1.3%
1921	236	−1.3%
1930	252	+6.8%
1950	233	−7.5%
1961	251	+7.7%
1970	219	−12.7%
1980	206	−5.9%
1991	181	−12.1%
2001	174	−3.9%
2011	158	−9.2%
2021	152	−3.8%
Source: Censuses
