= Křekov =

- Municipality
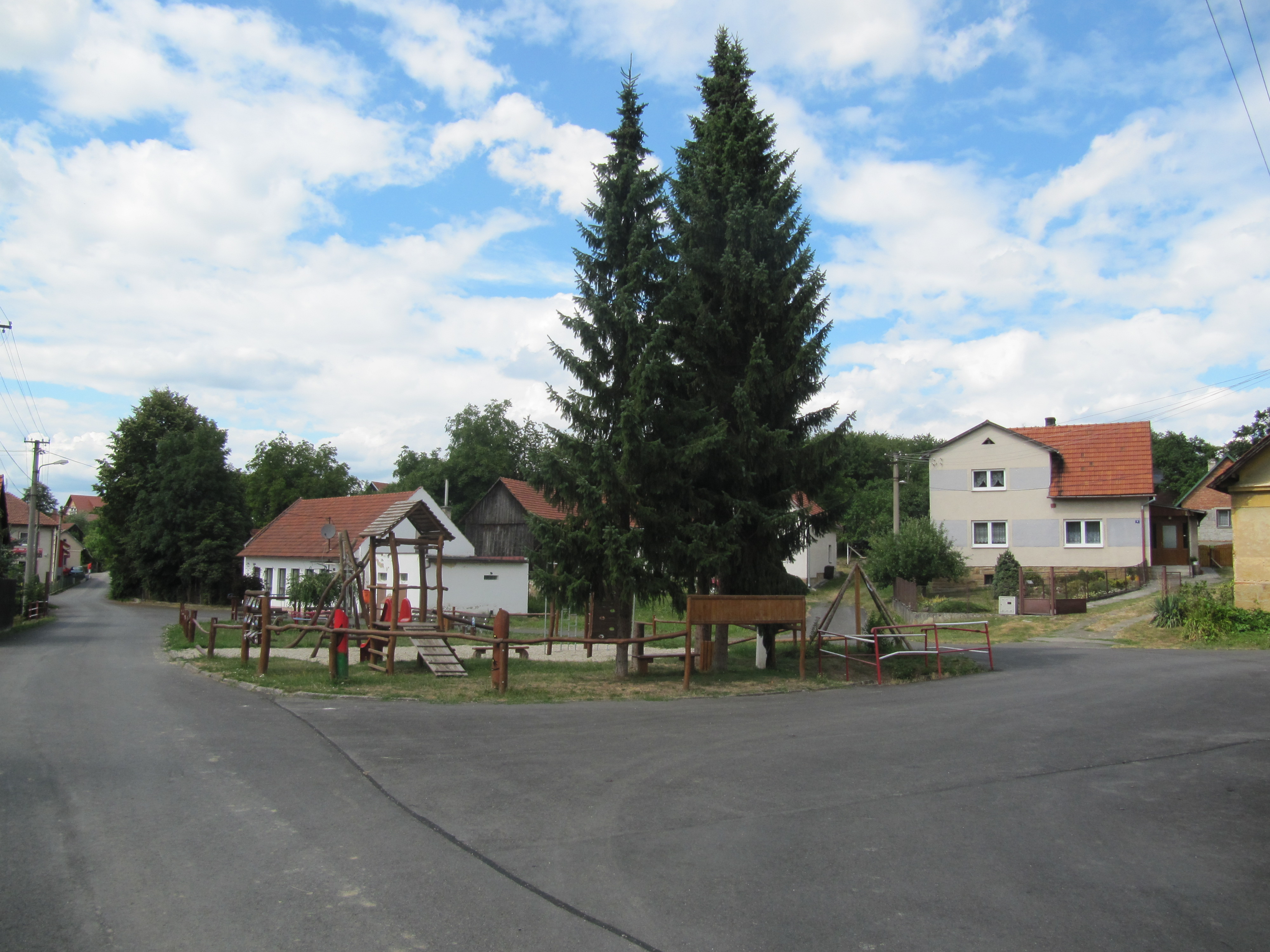
- Centre of Křekov

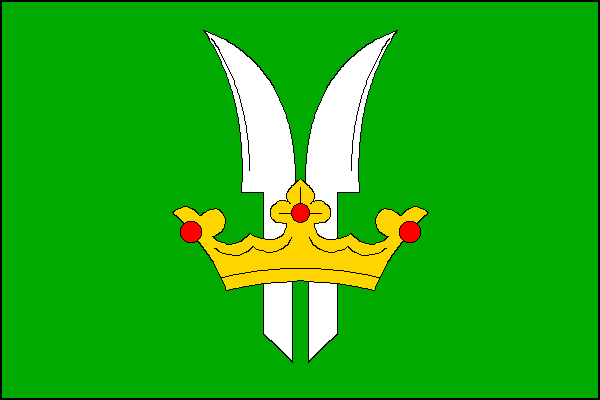
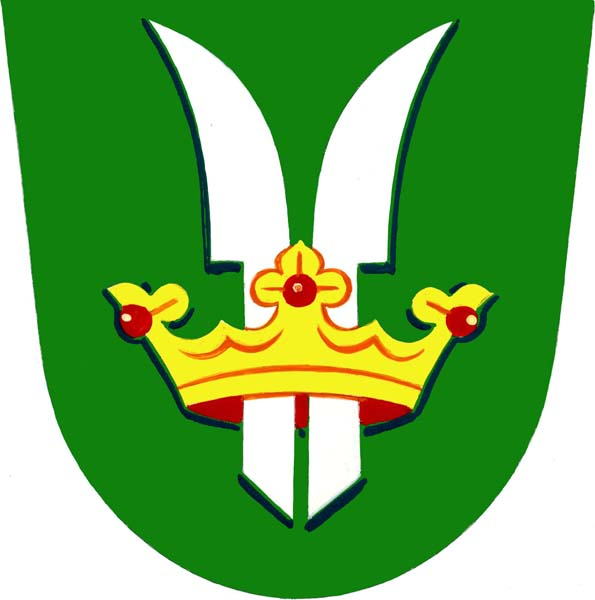
- Flag Coat of arms

- Location in the Czech Republic
- Coordinates: 49°7′46″N 17°58′4″E
- Country: Czech Republic
- Region: Zlín
- District: Zlín
- First mentioned: 1371

Area
  - Total: 3.85 km^{2} (1.49 sq mi)
- Elevation: 384 m (1,260 ft)

Population (2026-01-01)
  - Total: 195
  - Density: 50.6/km^{2} (131/sq mi)
- Time zone: UTC+1 (CET)
  - Summer (DST): UTC+2 (CEST)
- Postal code: 766 01
- Website: www.krekov.cz

Křekov is a municipality and village in Zlín District in the Zlín Region of the Czech Republic. It has about 200 inhabitants.

Křekov lies approximately 25 kilometres (16 mi) south-east of Zlín and 278 km (173 mi) south-east of Prague.

== Demographics ==
Historical population
Year	Pop.	±%
1869	260	—
1880	291	+11.9%
1890	287	−1.4%
1900	270	−5.9%
1910	280	+3.7%
1921	269	−3.9%
1930	289	+7.4%
1950	279	−3.5%
1961	274	−1.8%
1970	252	−8.0%
1980	197	−21.8%
1991	172	−12.7%
2001	163	−5.2%
2011	166	+1.8%
2021	181	+9.0%
Source: Censuses
