= Šarovy =

- Municipality
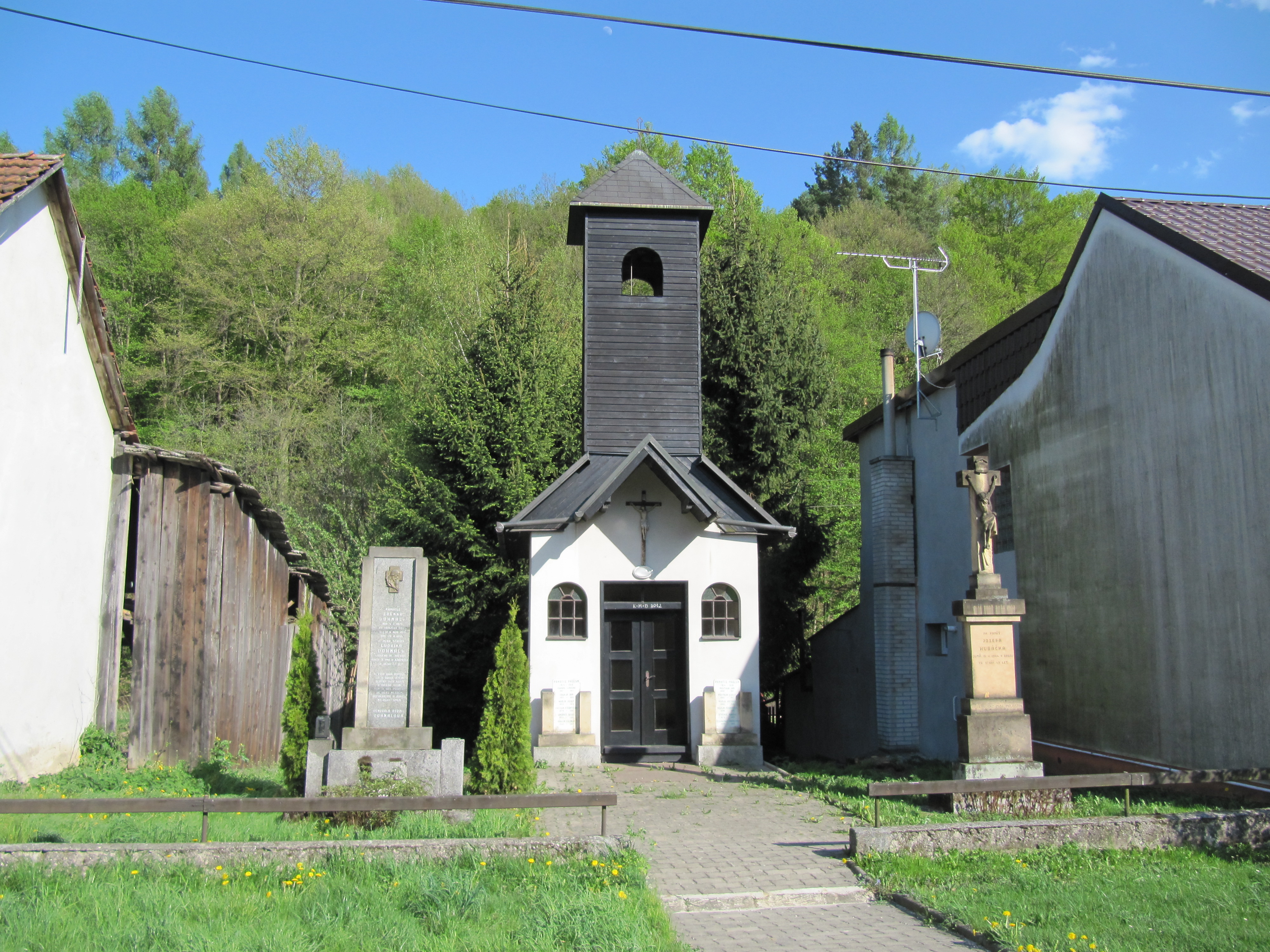
- Chapel in Šarovy

- Flag Coat of arms

- Location in the Czech Republic
- Coordinates: 49°8′55″N 17°36′25″E
- Country: Czech Republic
- Region: Zlín
- District: Zlín
- First mentioned: 1360

Area
  - Total: 2.23 km^{2} (0.86 sq mi)
- Elevation: 233 m (764 ft)

Population (2026-01-01)
  - Total: 272
  - Density: 122/km^{2} (316/sq mi)
- Time zone: UTC+1 (CET)
  - Summer (DST): UTC+2 (CEST)
- Postal code: 763 51
- Website: www.sarovy.cz

Šarovy is a municipality and village in Zlín District in the Zlín Region of the Czech Republic. It has about 300 inhabitants.

Šarovy lies approximately 11 kilometres (7 mi) south-west of Zlín and 252 km (157 mi) south-east of Prague.

== Demographics ==
Historical population
Year	Pop.	±%
1869	252	—
1880	271	+7.5%
1890	300	+10.7%
1900	318	+6.0%
1910	360	+13.2%
1921	332	−7.8%
1930	297	−10.5%
1950	258	−13.1%
1961	260	+0.8%
1970	268	+3.1%
1980	236	−11.9%
1991	229	−3.0%
2001	218	−4.8%
2011	229	+5.0%
2021	248	+8.3%
Source: Censuses
