= Vlčková =

- Municipality
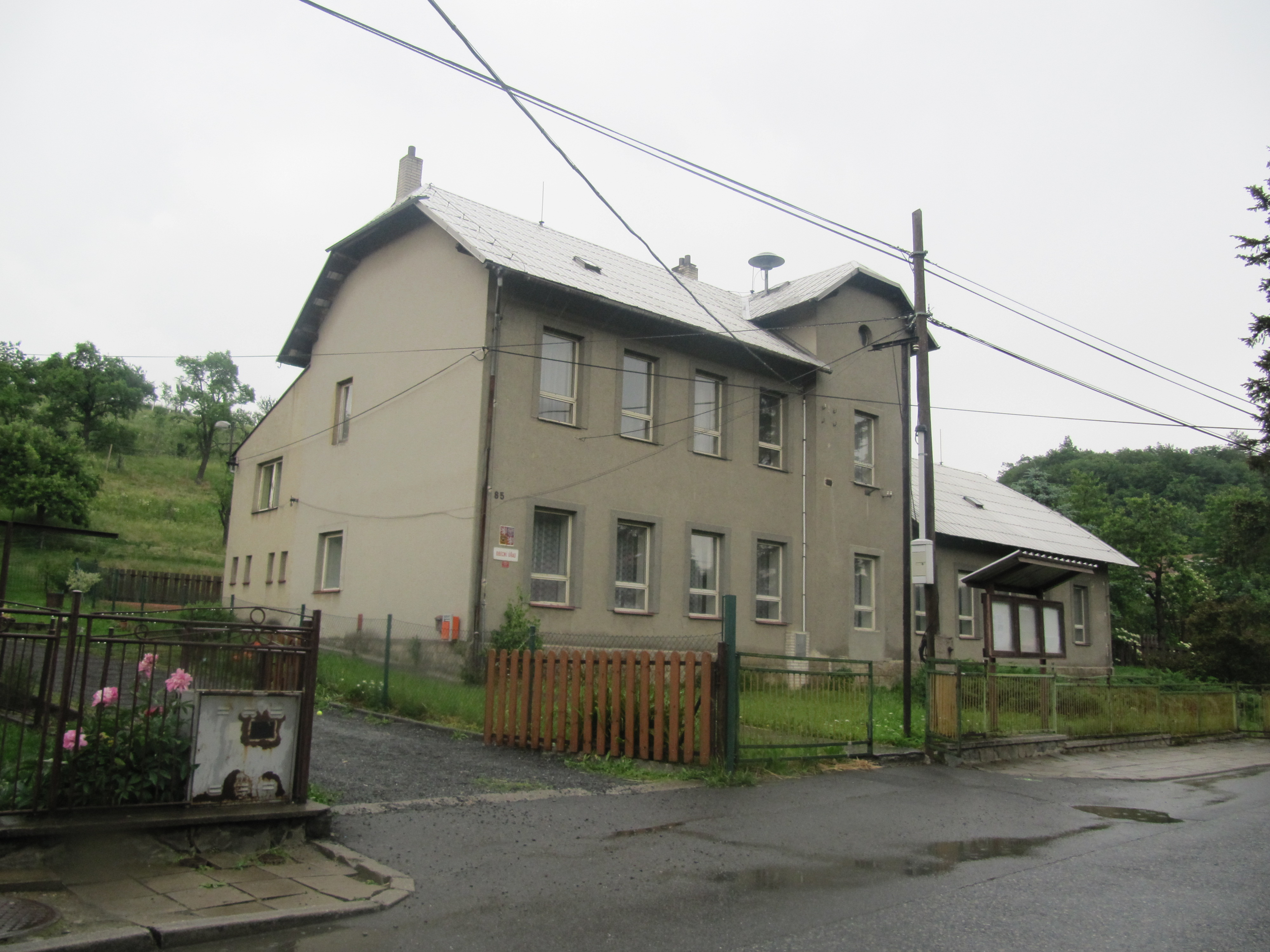
- Municipal office

- Flag Coat of arms

- Location in the Czech Republic
- Coordinates: 49°18′38″N 17°45′48″E
- Country: Czech Republic
- Region: Zlín
- District: Zlín
- First mentioned: 1373

Area
  - Total: 10.90 km^{2} (4.21 sq mi)
- Elevation: 377 m (1,237 ft)

Population (2026-01-01)
  - Total: 422
  - Density: 38.7/km^{2} (100/sq mi)
- Time zone: UTC+1 (CET)
  - Summer (DST): UTC+2 (CEST)
- Postal code: 763 19
- Website: www.vlckova-obec.cz

Vlčková is a municipality and village in Zlín District in the Zlín Region of the Czech Republic. It has about 400 inhabitants.

Vlčková lies approximately 12 kilometres (7 mi) north-east of Zlín and 255 km (158 mi) east of Prague.

== Demographics ==
Historical population
Year	Pop.	±%
1869	474	—
1880	524	+10.5%
1890	530	+1.1%
1900	545	+2.8%
1910	551	+1.1%
1921	479	−13.1%
1930	487	+1.7%
1950	448	−8.0%
1961	522	+16.5%
1970	494	−5.4%
1980	456	−7.7%
1991	399	−12.5%
2001	360	−9.8%
2011	384	+6.7%
2021	394	+2.6%
Source: Censuses
