= Nedašov =

- Municipality
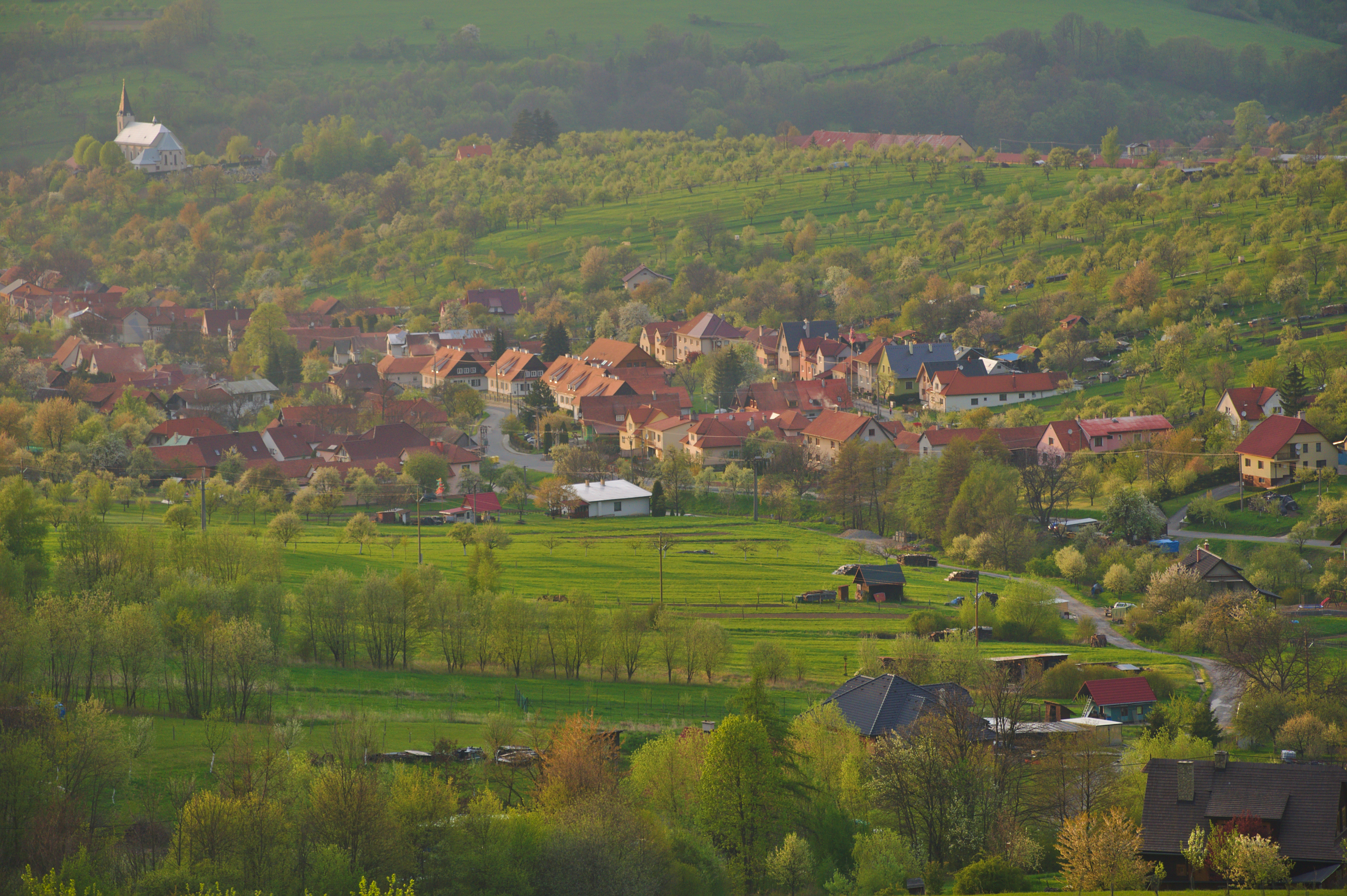
- General view of Nedašov

- Flag Coat of arms

- Location in the Czech Republic
- Coordinates: 49°6′28″N 18°4′13″E
- Country: Czech Republic
- Region: Zlín
- District: Zlín
- First mentioned: 1424

Area
  - Total: 12.41 km^{2} (4.79 sq mi)
- Elevation: 405 m (1,329 ft)

Population (2026-01-01)
  - Total: 1,332
  - Density: 107.3/km^{2} (278.0/sq mi)
- Time zone: UTC+1 (CET)
  - Summer (DST): UTC+2 (CEST)
- Postal code: 763 32
- Website: www.nedasov.cz

Nedašov is a municipality and village in Zlín District in the Zlín Region of the Czech Republic. It has about 1,300 inhabitants.

Nedašov lies approximately 33 kilometres (21 mi) south-east of Zlín and 286 km (178 mi) east of Prague.

== History ==
The first written mention of Nedašov is from 1424.

== Demographics ==
Historical population
Year	Pop.	±%
1869	683	—
1880	701	+2.6%
1890	771	+10.0%
1900	803	+4.2%
1910	785	−2.2%
1921	812	+3.4%
1930	898	+10.6%
1950	956	+6.5%
1961	1,215	+27.1%
1970	1,271	+4.6%
1980	1,295	+1.9%
1991	1,362	+5.2%
2001	1,445	+6.1%
2011	1,388	−3.9%
2021	1,315	−5.3%
Source: Censuses
