= Podkopná Lhota =

- Municipality
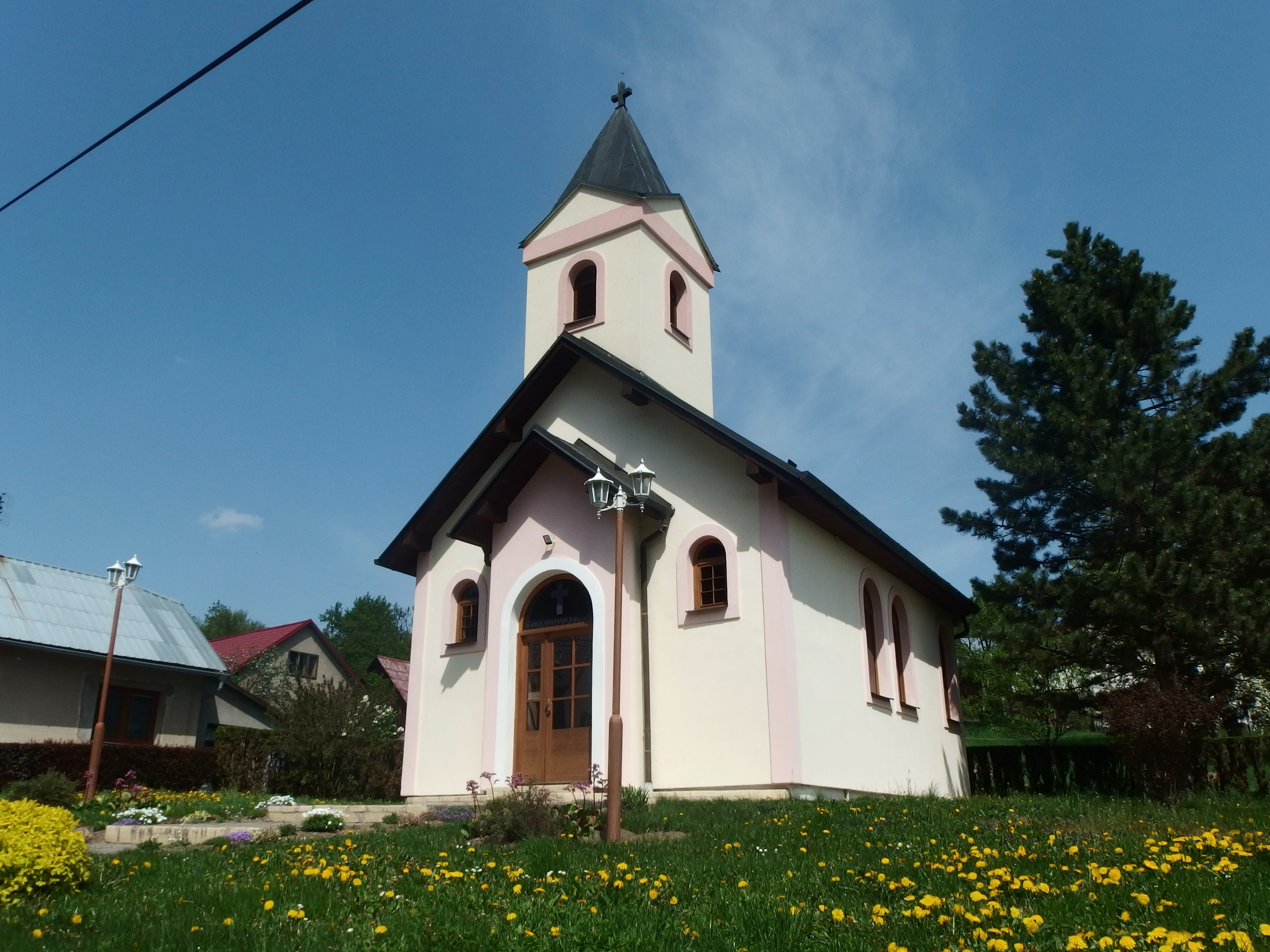
- Chapel of Saint Wenceslaus

- Flag Coat of arms

- Location in the Czech Republic
- Coordinates: 49°18′21″N 17°49′53″E
- Country: Czech Republic
- Region: Zlín
- District: Zlín
- First mentioned: 1644

Area
  - Total: 4.83 km^{2} (1.86 sq mi)
- Elevation: 405 m (1,329 ft)

Population (2026-01-01)
  - Total: 318
  - Density: 65.8/km^{2} (171/sq mi)
- Time zone: UTC+1 (CET)
  - Summer (DST): UTC+2 (CEST)
- Postal code: 763 18
- Website: podkopnalhota.cz

Podkopná Lhota is a municipality and village in Zlín District in the Zlín Region of the Czech Republic. It has about 300 inhabitants.

Podkopná Lhota lies approximately 15 kilometres (9 mi) north-east of Zlín and 260 km (160 mi) east of Prague.

== Demographics ==
Historical population
Year	Pop.	±%
1869	397	—
1880	470	+18.4%
1890	481	+2.3%
1900	453	−5.8%
1910	482	+6.4%
1921	476	−1.2%
1930	470	−1.3%
1950	389	−17.2%
1961	443	+13.9%
1970	379	−14.4%
1980	384	+1.3%
1991	342	−10.9%
2001	342	+0.0%
2011	305	−10.8%
2021	317	+3.9%
Source: Censuses
