= Lhotsko =

- Municipality
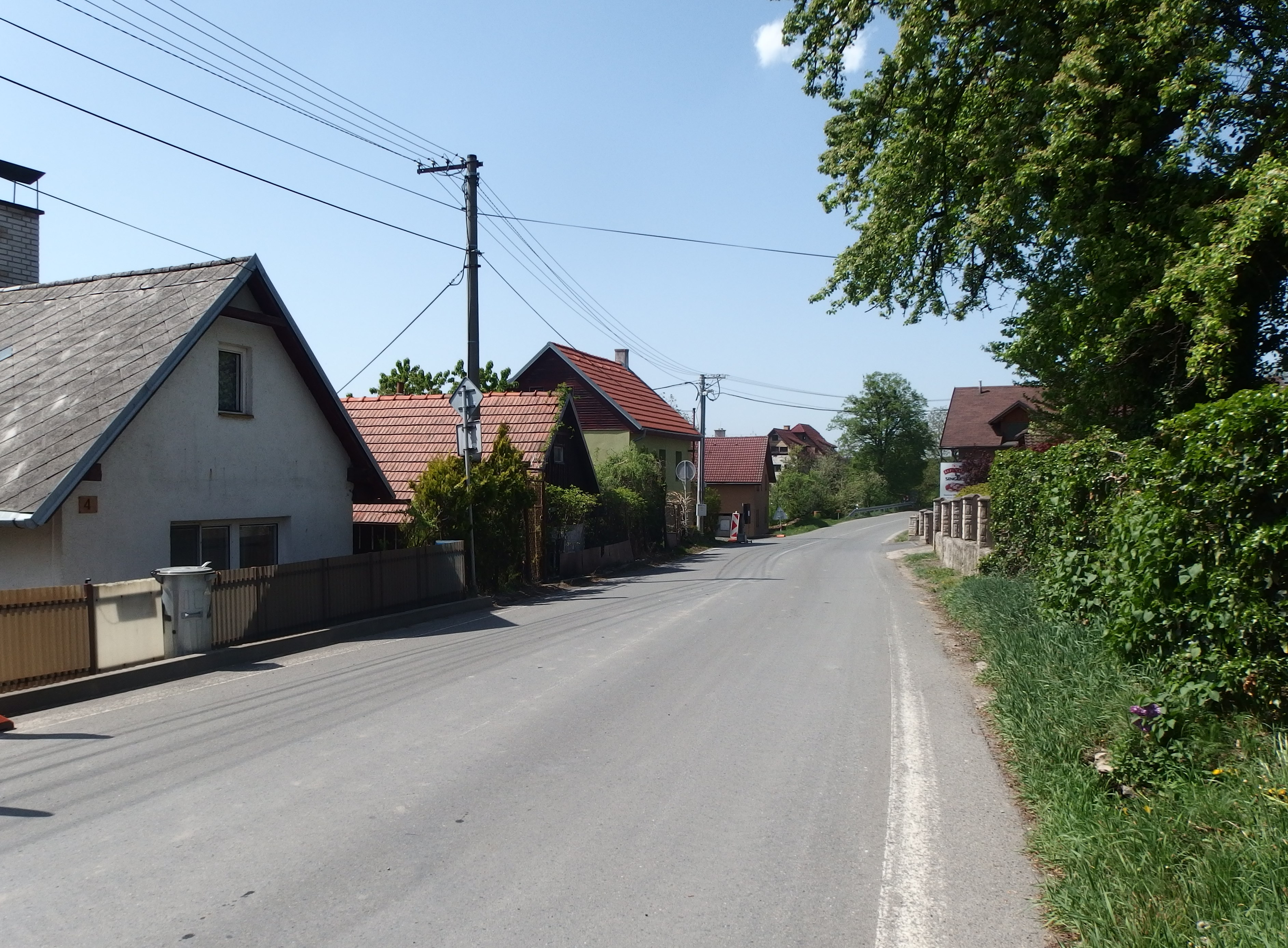
- Main street

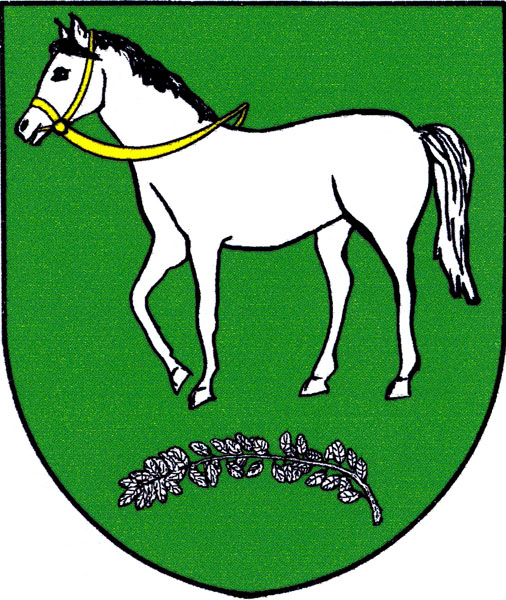
- Flag Coat of arms

- Location in the Czech Republic
- Coordinates: 49°12′44″N 17°53′0″E
- Country: Czech Republic
- Region: Zlín
- District: Zlín
- First mentioned: 1549

Area
  - Total: 2.96 km^{2} (1.14 sq mi)
- Elevation: 363 m (1,191 ft)

Population (2026-01-01)
  - Total: 299
  - Density: 101/km^{2} (262/sq mi)
- Time zone: UTC+1 (CET)
  - Summer (DST): UTC+2 (CEST)
- Postal code: 763 12
- Website: www.obeclhotsko.cz

Lhotsko is a municipality and village in Zlín District in the Zlín Region of the Czech Republic. It has about 300 inhabitants.

Lhotsko lies approximately 16 kilometres (10 mi) east of Zlín and 268 km (167 mi) east of Prague.

== Demographics ==
Historical population
Year	Pop.	±%
1869	171	—
1880	190	+11.1%
1890	224	+17.9%
1900	196	−12.5%
1910	206	+5.1%
1921	229	+11.2%
1930	250	+9.2%
1950	237	−5.2%
1961	258	+8.9%
1970	247	−4.3%
1980	247	+0.0%
1991	240	−2.8%
2001	239	−0.4%
2011	248	+3.8%
2021	248	+0.0%
Source: Censuses
