= Ostrata =

- Municipality
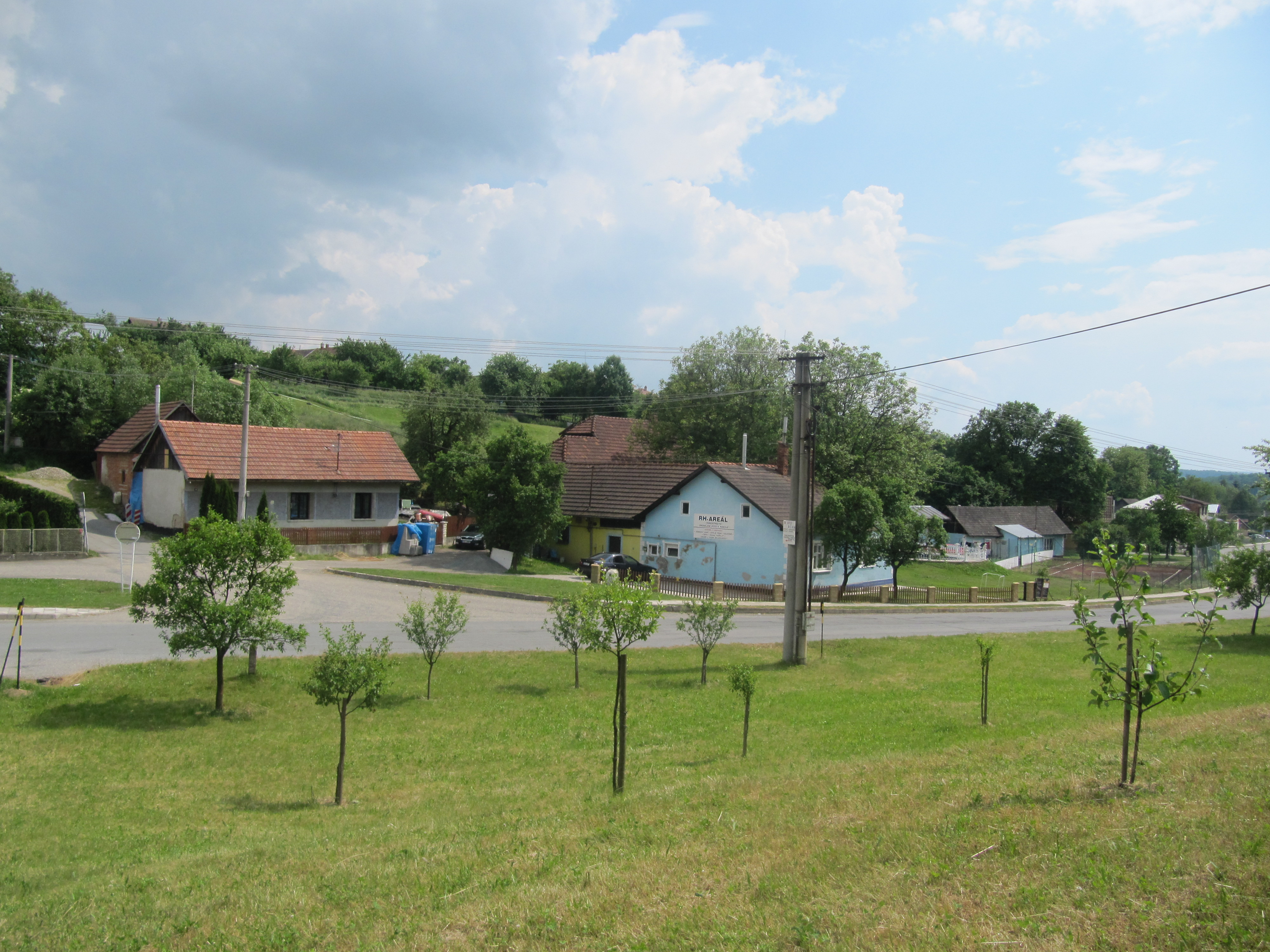
- Centre of Ostrata

- Flag Coat of arms

- Location in the Czech Republic
- Coordinates: 49°16′15″N 17°46′0″E
- Country: Czech Republic
- Region: Zlín
- District: Zlín
- First mentioned: 1391

Area
  - Total: 3.56 km^{2} (1.37 sq mi)
- Elevation: 314 m (1,030 ft)

Population (2026-01-01)
  - Total: 426
  - Density: 120/km^{2} (310/sq mi)
- Time zone: UTC+1 (CET)
  - Summer (DST): UTC+2 (CEST)
- Postal code: 763 11
- Website: www.ostrata.cz

Ostrata is a municipality and village in Zlín District in the Zlín Region of the Czech Republic. It has about 400 inhabitants.

Ostrata lies approximately 9 kilometres (6 mi) north-east of Zlín and 258 km (160 mi) east of Prague.

== Demographics ==
Historical population
Year	Pop.	±%
1869	291	—
1880	291	+0.0%
1890	303	+4.1%
1900	331	+9.2%
1910	294	−11.2%
1921	303	+3.1%
1930	330	+8.9%
1950	354	+7.3%
1961	380	+7.3%
1970	345	−9.2%
1980	330	−4.3%
1991	333	+0.9%
2001	346	+3.9%
2011	381	+10.1%
2021	405	+6.3%
Source: Censuses
