= Ublo =

- Municipality
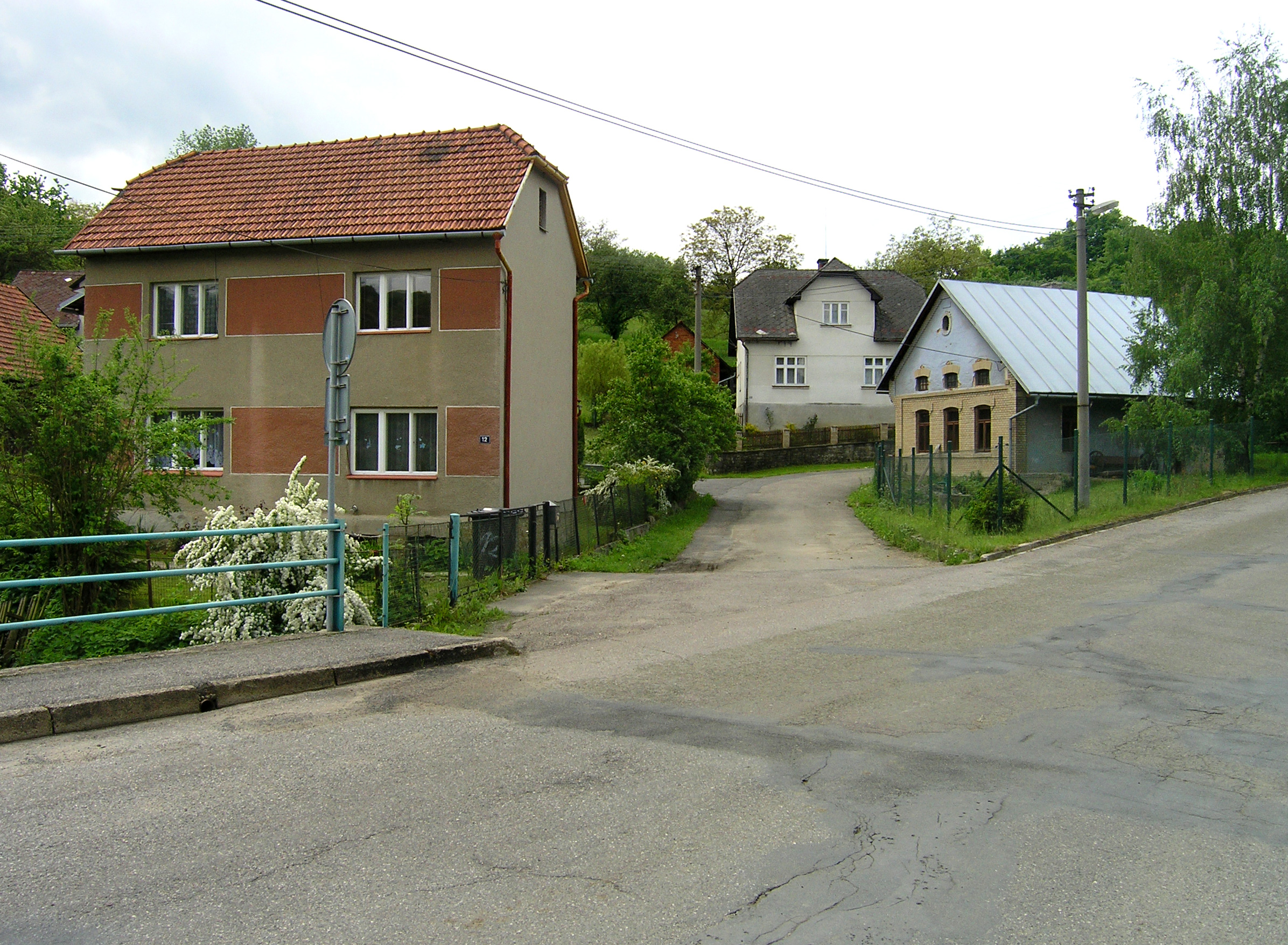
- Northern part of Ublo

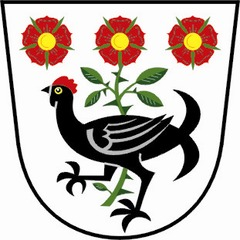
- Flag Coat of arms

- Location in the Czech Republic
- Coordinates: 49°13′59″N 17°54′4″E
- Country: Czech Republic
- Region: Zlín
- District: Zlín
- First mentioned: 1450

Area
  - Total: 4.64 km^{2} (1.79 sq mi)
- Elevation: 470 m (1,540 ft)

Population (2026-01-01)
  - Total: 299
  - Density: 64.4/km^{2} (167/sq mi)
- Time zone: UTC+1 (CET)
  - Summer (DST): UTC+2 (CEST)
- Postal code: 763 12
- Website: www.ublo.cz

Ublo is a municipality and village in Zlín District in the Zlín Region of the Czech Republic. It has about 300 inhabitants.

Ublo lies approximately 18 kilometres (11 mi) east of Zlín and 269 km (167 mi) east of Prague.

== Demographics ==
Historical population
Year	Pop.	±%
1869	323	—
1880	361	+11.8%
1890	373	+3.3%
1900	396	+6.2%
1910	428	+8.1%
1921	469	+9.6%
1930	465	−0.9%
1950	361	−22.4%
1961	394	+9.1%
1970	338	−14.2%
1980	281	−16.9%
1991	241	−14.2%
2001	255	+5.8%
2011	269	+5.5%
2021	280	+4.1%
Source: Censuses
