= Žlutava =

- Municipality
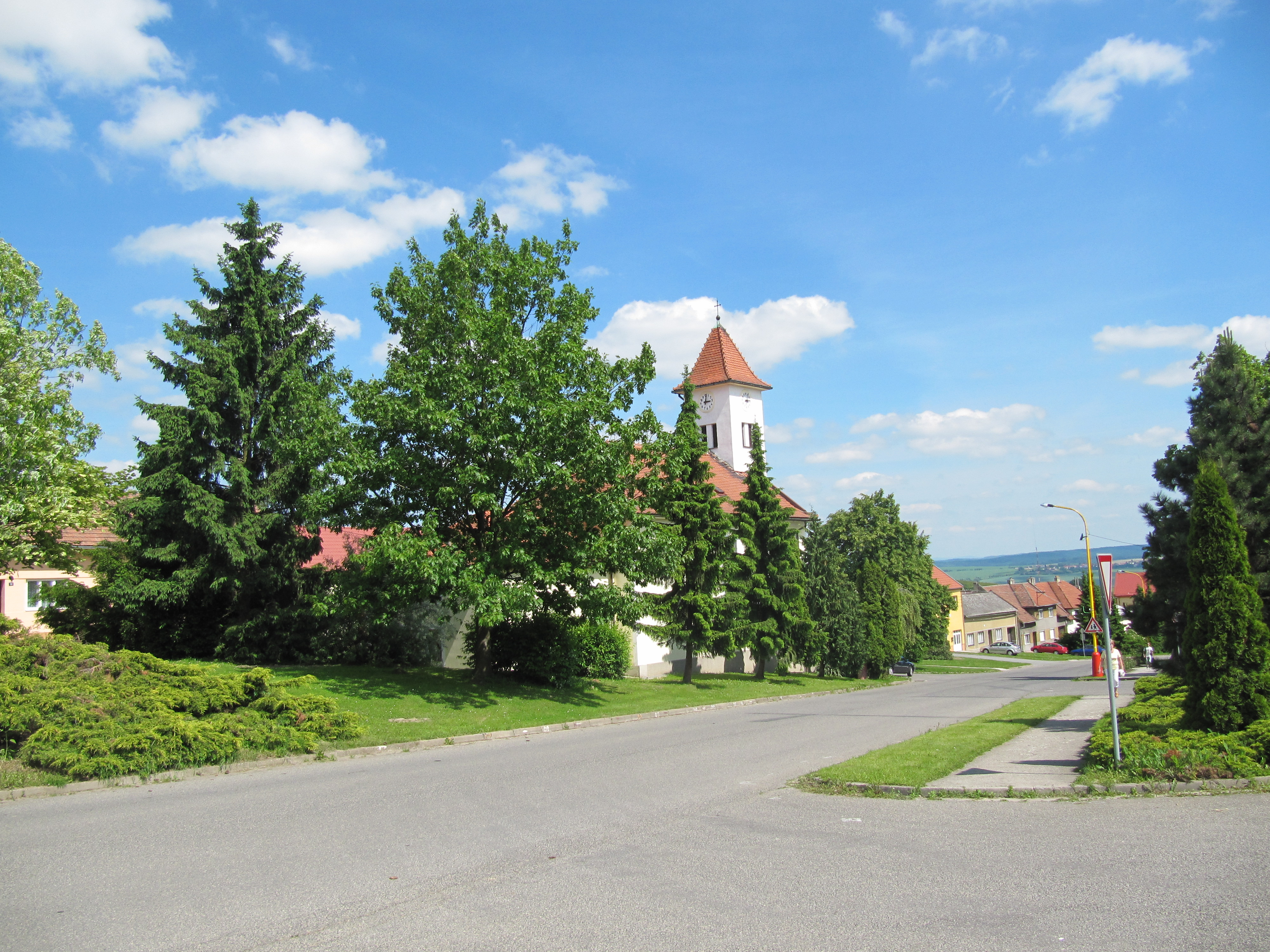
- Common in Žlutava

- Flag Coat of arms

- Location in the Czech Republic
- Coordinates: 49°11′59″N 17°29′25″E
- Country: Czech Republic
- Region: Zlín
- District: Zlín
- First mentioned: 1667

Area
  - Total: 7.40 km^{2} (2.86 sq mi)
- Elevation: 298 m (978 ft)

Population (2026-01-01)
  - Total: 1,148
  - Density: 155/km^{2} (402/sq mi)
- Time zone: UTC+1 (CET)
  - Summer (DST): UTC+2 (CEST)
- Postal code: 763 61
- Website: www.zlutava.cz

Žlutava is a municipality and village in Zlín District in the Zlín Region of the Czech Republic. It has about 1,100 inhabitants.

Žlutava lies approximately 14 kilometres (9 mi) west of Zlín and 242 km (150 mi) south-east of Prague.

== Demographics ==
Historical population
Year	Pop.	±%
1869	589	—
1880	651	+10.5%
1890	651	+0.0%
1900	768	+18.0%
1910	758	−1.3%
1921	799	+5.4%
1930	844	+5.6%
1950	1,007	+19.3%
1961	1,080	+7.2%
1970	1,047	−3.1%
1980	935	−10.7%
1991	870	−7.0%
2001	963	+10.7%
2011	1,114	+15.7%
2021	1,151	+3.3%
Source: Censuses
