= Zlín District =

Zlín District Okres Zlín
- District
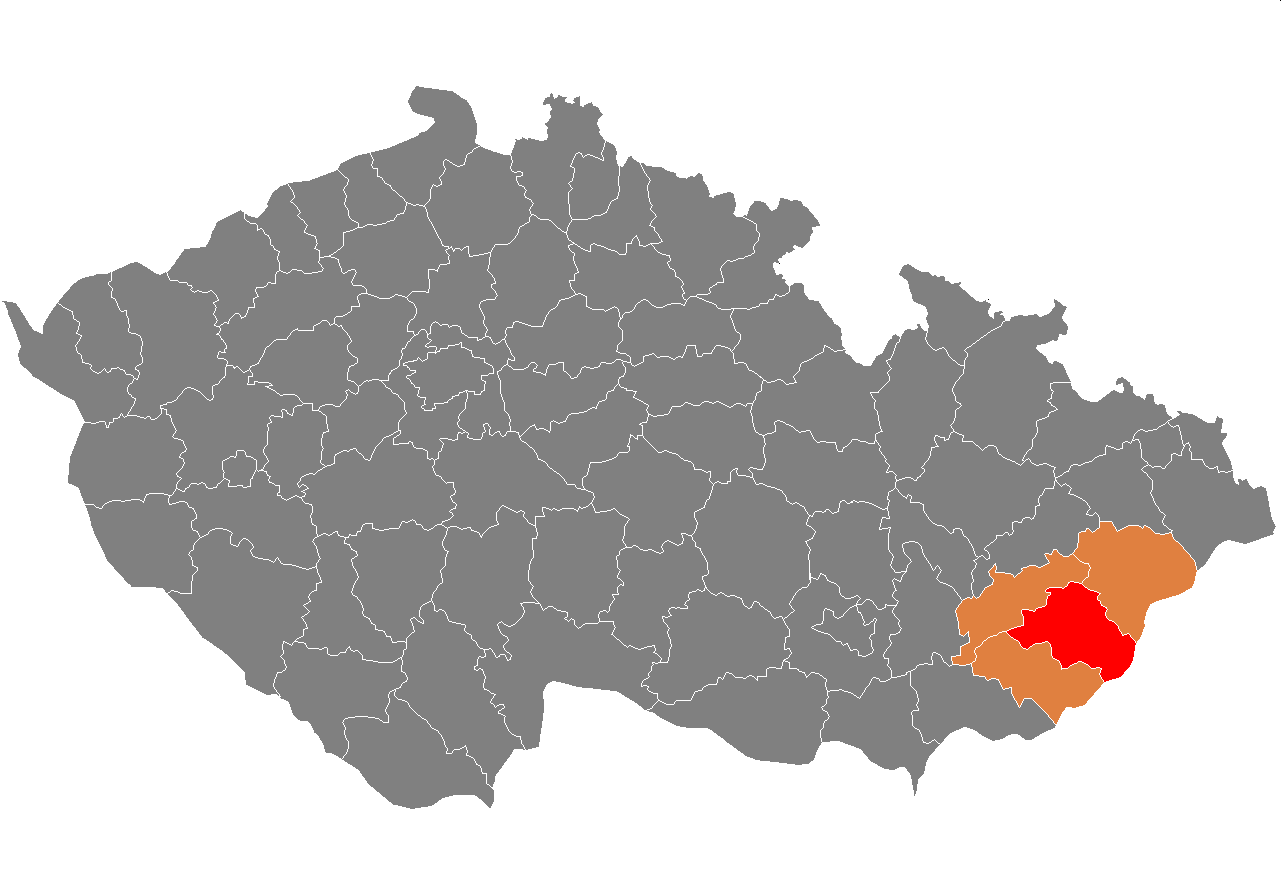
- Location in the Zlín Region within the Czech Republic
- Coordinates: 48°57′N 17°11′E
- Country: Czech Republic
- Region: Zlín
- Capital: Zlín

Area
  - Total: 1,045.25 km^{2} (403.57 sq mi)

Population (2026)
  - Total: 191,583
  - Density: 183.289/km^{2} (474.717/sq mi)
- Time zone: UTC+1 (CET)
  - Summer (DST): UTC+2 (CEST)
- Municipalities: 91
- * Cities and towns: 10
- * Market towns: 1

Zlín District (Czech: okres Zlín) is a district in the Zlín Region of the Czech Republic. Its capital is the city of Zlín.

== Administrative division ==
Zlín District is divided into five administrative districts of municipalities with extended competence: Zlín, Luhačovice, Otrokovice, Valašské Klobouky and Vizovice.

=== List of municipalities ===
Cities and towns are marked in bold and market towns in italics:

Bělov - Biskupice - Bohuslavice nad Vláří - Bohuslavice u Zlína - Bratřejov - Březnice - Březová - Březůvky - Brumov-Bylnice - Dešná - Dobrkovice - Dolní Lhota - Doubravy - Drnovice - Držková - Fryšták - Halenkovice - Haluzice - Horní Lhota - Hostišová - Hřivínův Újezd - Hrobice - Hvozdná - Jasenná - Jestřabí - Kaňovice - Karlovice - Kašava - Kelníky - Komárov - Křekov - Lhota - Lhotsko - Lípa - Lipová - Loučka - Ludkovice - Luhačovice - Lukov - Lukoveček - Lutonina - Machová - Mysločovice - Napajedla - Návojná - Nedašov - Nedašova Lhota - Neubuz - Oldřichovice - Ostrata - Otrokovice - Petrůvka - Podhradí - Podkopná Lhota - Pohořelice - Poteč - Pozlovice - Provodov - Racková - Rokytnice - Rudimov - Šanov - Šarovy - Sazovice - Sehradice - Slavičín - Slopné - Slušovice - Spytihněv - Štítná nad Vláří-Popov - Študlov - Tečovice - Tichov - Tlumačov - Trnava - Ublo - Újezd - Valašské Klobouky - Valašské Příkazy - Velký Ořechov - Veselá - Vizovice - Vlachova Lhota - Vlachovice - Vlčková - Všemina - Vysoké Pole - Zádveřice-Raková - Želechovice nad Dřevnicí - Zlín - Žlutava

== Geography ==
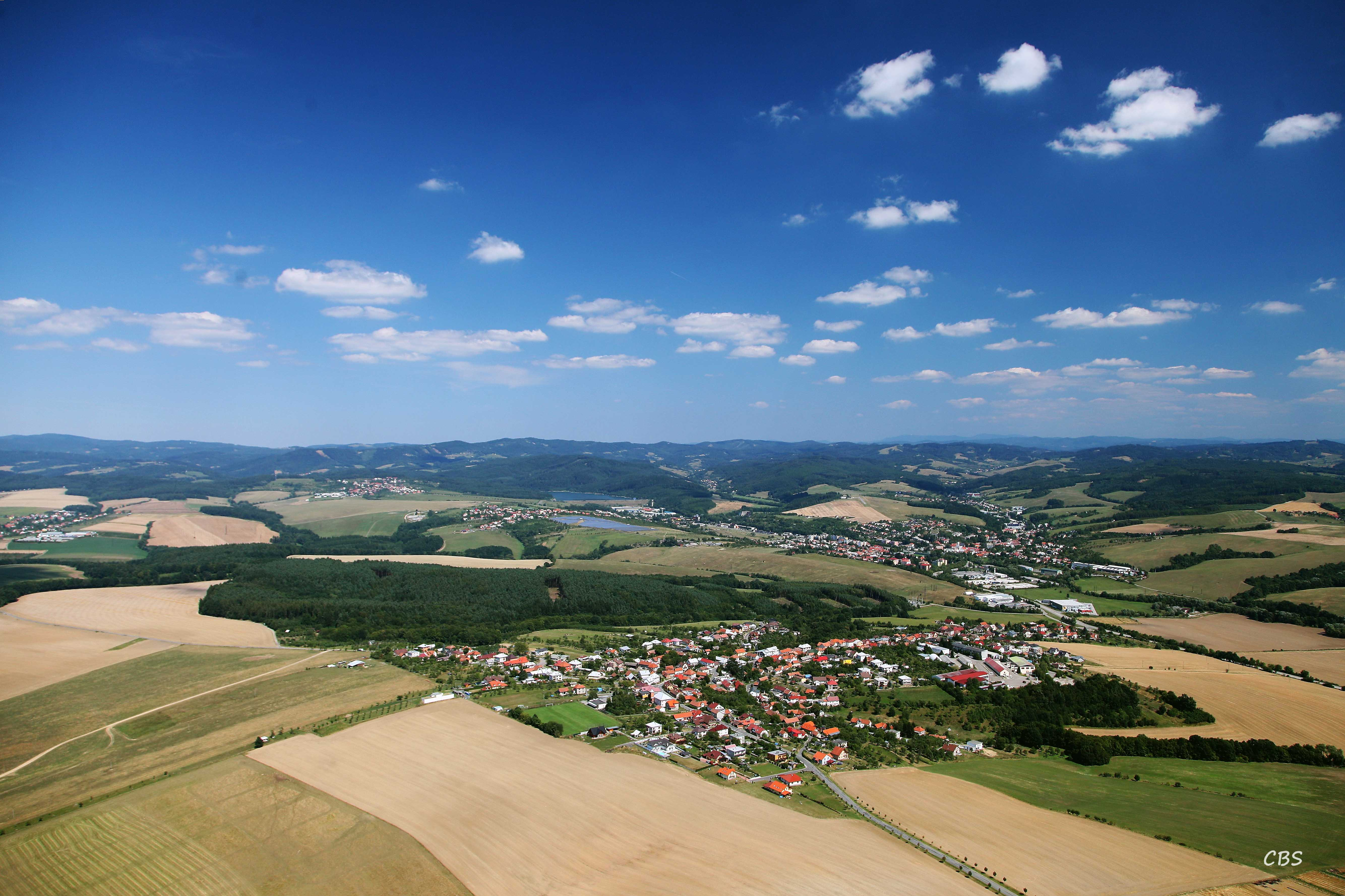
Veselá and surrounding landscape

Zlín District borders Slovakia in the southeast. In the west, a lowland extends into the district, otherwise the terrain is hilly to mountainous. The territory extends into six geomorphological mesoregions: Vizovice Highlands (most of the territory), White Carpathians (southeast), Hostýn-Vsetín Mountains (north), Upper Morava Valley (a small part in the northwest), Lower Morava Valley (a small part in the southwest), and Chřiby (a small part in the west). The highest point of the district is the mountain Průklesy in Nedašov with an elevation of 836 m (2,743 ft). The lowest point of the district is the river bed of the Morava in Spytihněv at 180 m (590 ft).

From the total district area of 1,045.3 km^{2} (403.6 sq mi), agricultural land occupies 474.1 km^{2} (183.1 sq mi), forests occupy 446.8 km^{2} (172.5 sq mi), and water area occupies 12.3 km^{2} (4.7 sq mi). Forests cover 42.7% of the district's area.

The main river of the district is the Morava, which crosses the district in the west. The area is poor in bodies of water. The only significant body of water is the Slušovice Reservoir.

Bílé Karpaty is a protected landscape area that covers the southeastern part of the district.

== Demographics ==
Historical population

Year	Pop.	±%
1869	73,014	—
1880	77,891	+6.7%
1890	79,767	+2.4%
1900	83,892	+5.2%
1910	88,115	+5.0%

Year	Pop.	±%
1921	89,596	+1.7%
1930	113,428	+26.6%
1950	150,466	+32.7%
1961	165,397	+9.9%
1970	173,407	+4.8%

Year	Pop.	±%
1980	191,634	+10.5%
1991	197,071	+2.8%
2001	195,618	−0.7%
2011	190,488	−2.6%
2021	187,371	−1.6%

Source: Censuses

=== Most populous municipalities ===
Name	Population	Area (km^{2})
Zlín	74,917	103
Otrokovice	17,239	20
Napajedla	6,981	20
Slavičín	6,168	34
Brumov-Bylnice	5,372	56
Luhačovice	4,978	33
Valašské Klobouky	4,864	27
Vizovice	4,776	29
Fryšták	3,826	24
Slušovice	2,929	7

== Economy ==
The largest employers with headquarters in Zlín District and at least 1,000 employees are:

Economic entity	Location	Number of employees	Main activity
Continental Barum	Otrokovice	4,000–4,999	Manufacture of tyres
HP Tronic	Zlín	3,000–3,999	Retail sale
Regional Hospital of T. Baťa	Zlín	3,000–3,999	Health care
Regional Police Directorate of the Zlín Region	Zlín	1,500–1,999	Public order and safety activities
Tomas Bata University in Zlín	Zlín	1,500–1,999	Education
Fatra	Napajedla	1,000–1,499	Manufacture of plastic products
City of Zlín	Zlín	1,000–1,499	Public administration

Well-known companies employing 500–999 people and based in Zlín are Baťa and Tescoma.

== Transport ==
The D55 motorway, which separates from the D1 motorway, leads to Otrokovice. The I/49 road runs from Otrokovice to the Czech–Slovak border via Zlín, across the district.

== Sights ==
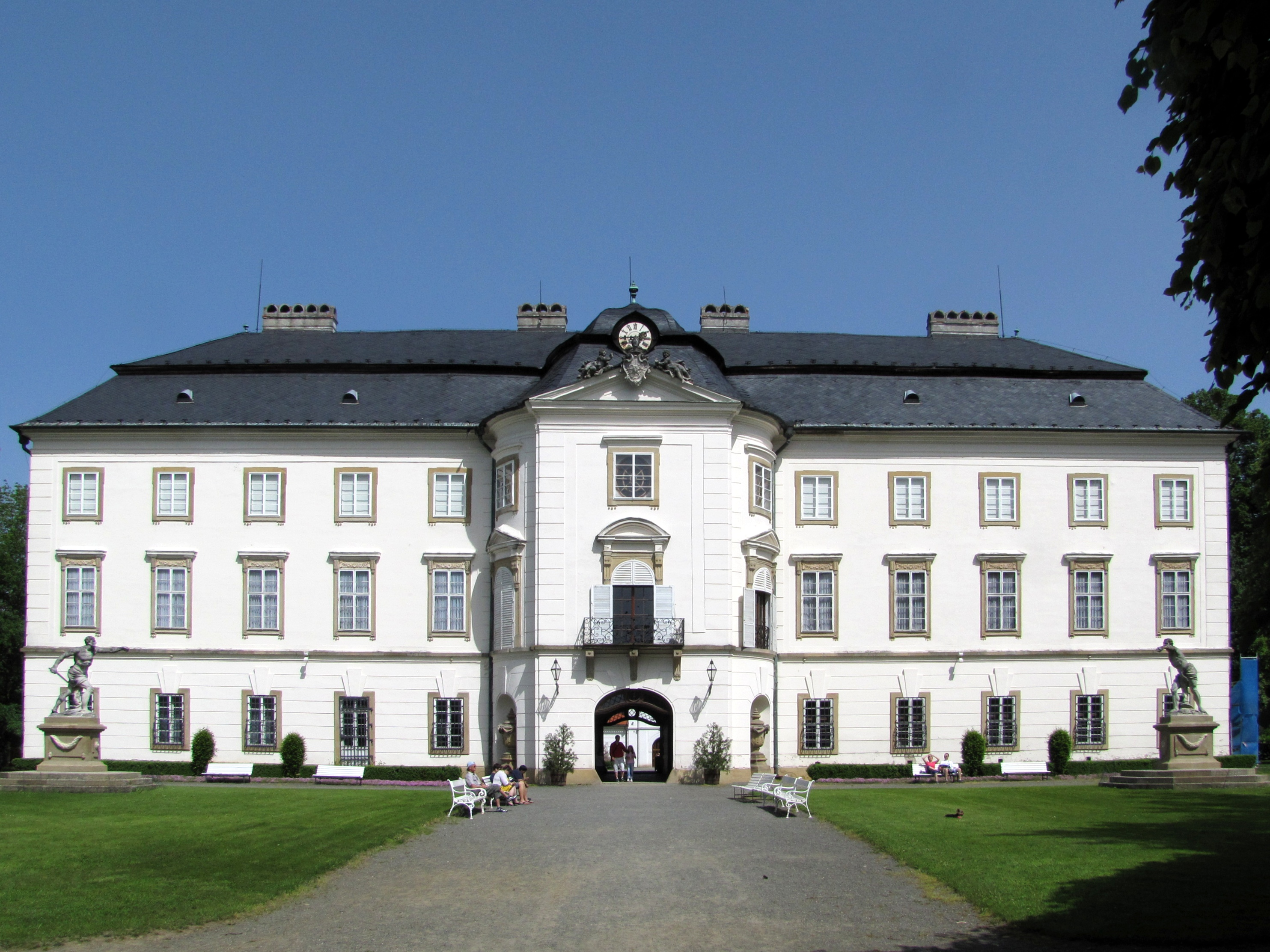
Vizovice Castle

The most important monuments in the district, protected as national cultural monuments, are:

- Monument to the resistance in Drnovice-Ploština
- Vizovice Castle
- Mikuláštík's office in Jasenná

The best-preserved settlements, protected as monument zones, are:

- Brumov
- Brumov – workers' colony
- Fryšták
- Luhačovice
- Napajedla
- Valašské Klobouky
- Vizovice
- Zlín

The most visited tourist destination are the Zlín-Lešná Zoo and Museum of South East Moravia in Zlín.
