= Lutonina =

- Municipality
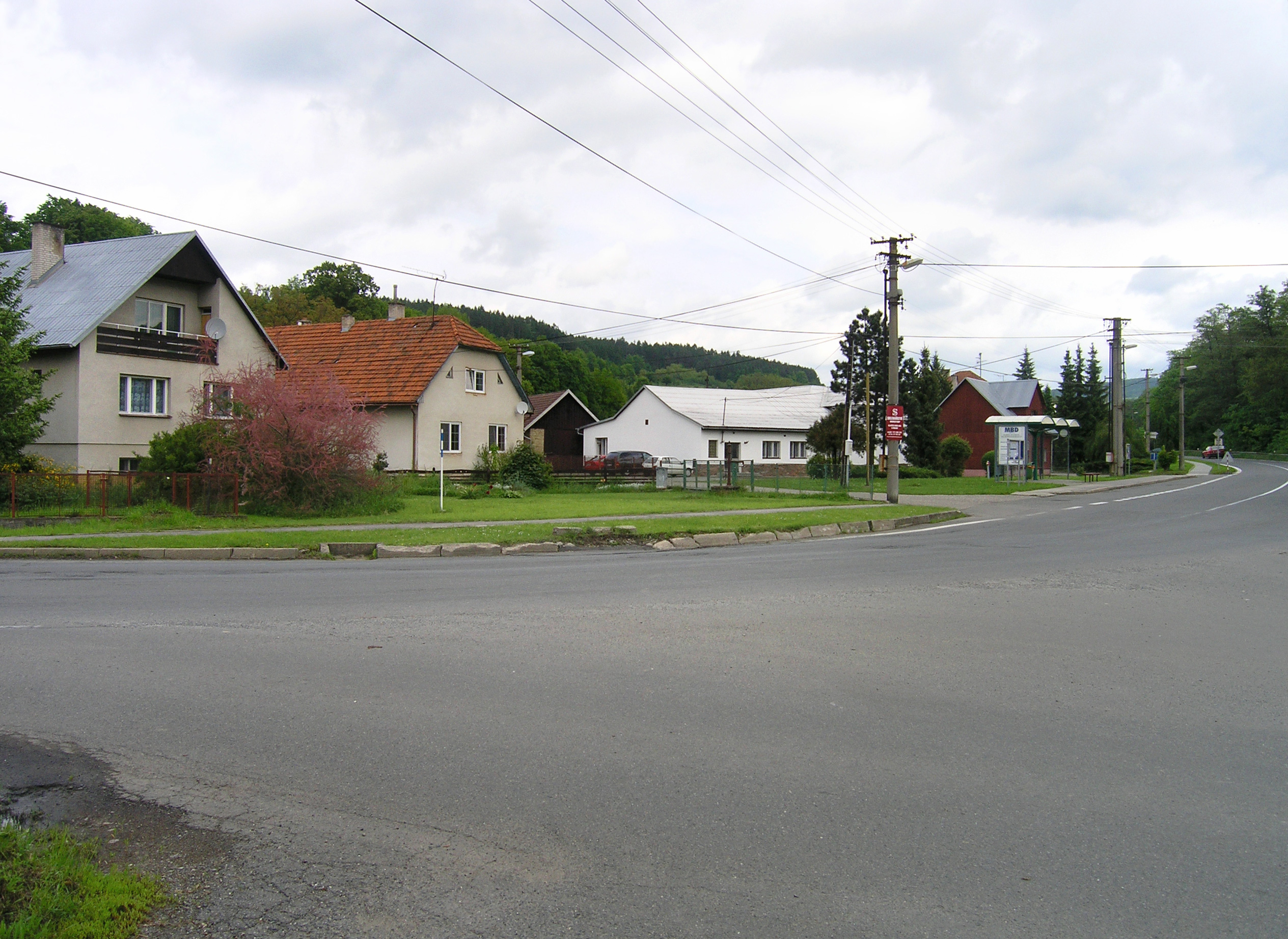
- Centre of Lutonina

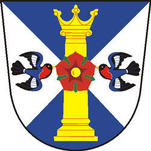
- Flag Coat of arms

- Location in the Czech Republic
- Coordinates: 49°14′19″N 17°52′58″E
- Country: Czech Republic
- Region: Zlín
- District: Zlín
- First mentioned: 1261

Area
  - Total: 6.11 km^{2} (2.36 sq mi)
- Elevation: 329 m (1,079 ft)

Population (2026-01-01)
  - Total: 421
  - Density: 68.9/km^{2} (178/sq mi)
- Time zone: UTC+1 (CET)
  - Summer (DST): UTC+2 (CEST)
- Postal code: 763 12
- Website: www.lutonina.cz

Lutonina is a municipality and village in Zlín District in the Zlín Region of the Czech Republic. It has about 400 inhabitants.

Lutonina lies approximately 17 kilometres (11 mi) east of Zlín and 268 km (167 mi) east of Prague.

== Demographics ==
Historical population
Year	Pop.	±%
1869	395	—
1880	441	+11.6%
1890	408	−7.5%
1900	450	+10.3%
1910	443	−1.6%
1921	480	+8.4%
1930	453	−5.6%
1950	442	−2.4%
1961	491	+11.1%
1970	454	−7.5%
1980	429	−5.5%
1991	419	−2.3%
2001	394	−6.0%
2011	402	+2.0%
2021	411	+2.2%
Source: Censuses
