= Lukoveček =

- Municipality
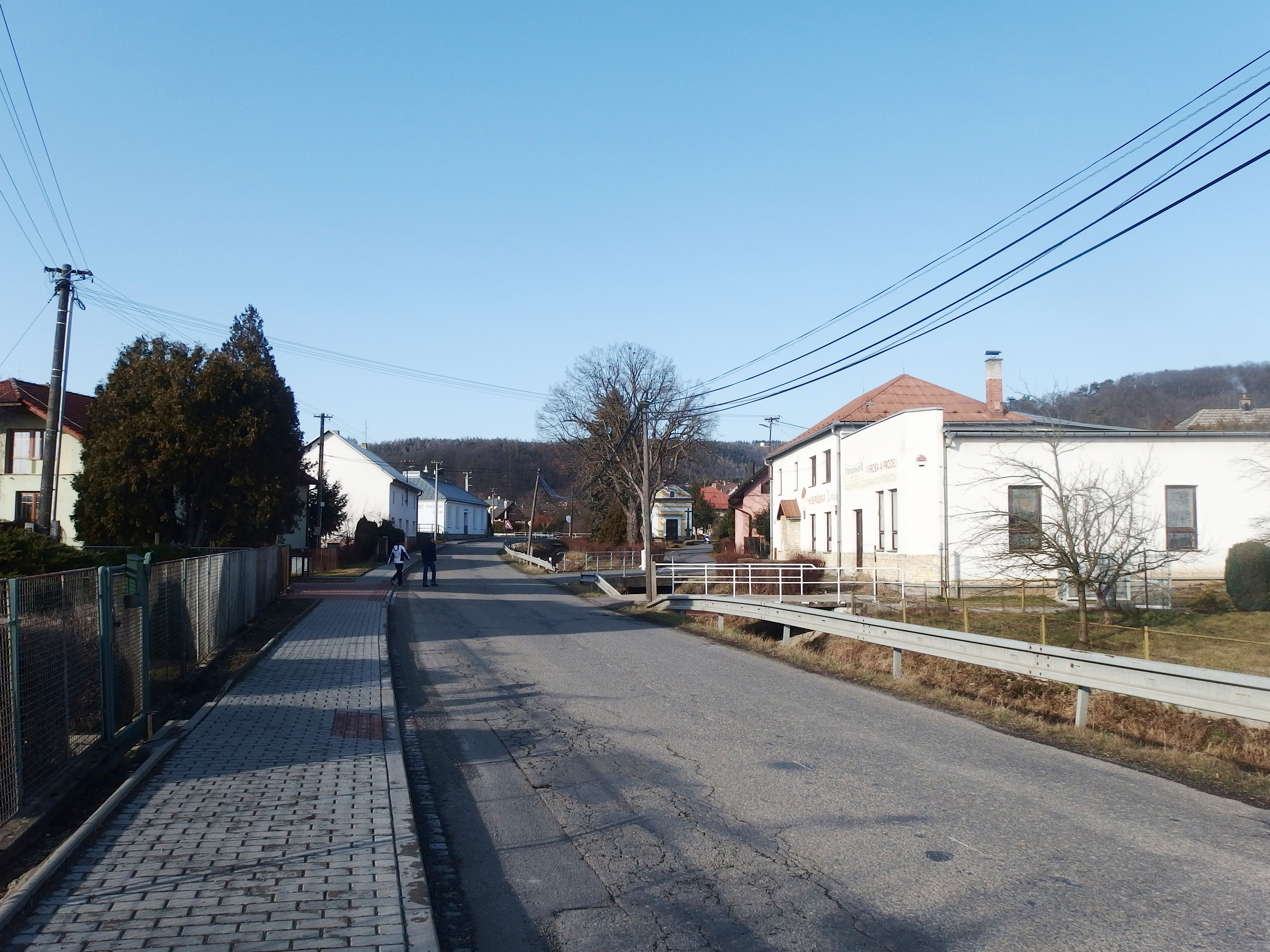
- Main street in the centre of Lukoveček

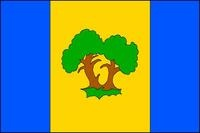
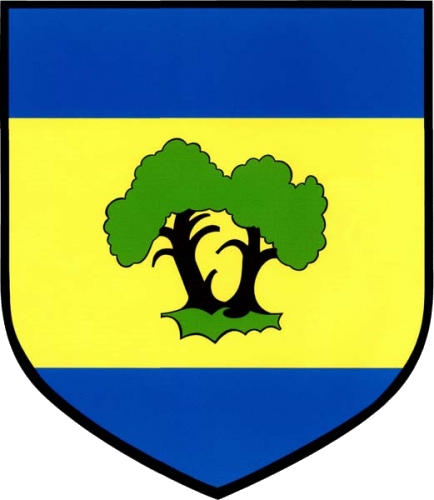
- Flag Coat of arms

- Location in the Czech Republic
- Coordinates: 49°18′13″N 17°40′7″E
- Country: Czech Republic
- Region: Zlín
- District: Zlín
- First mentioned: 1480

Area
  - Total: 22.70 km^{2} (8.76 sq mi)
- Elevation: 305 m (1,001 ft)

Population (2026-01-01)
  - Total: 447
  - Density: 19.7/km^{2} (51.0/sq mi)
- Time zone: UTC+1 (CET)
  - Summer (DST): UTC+2 (CEST)
- Postal code: 763 16
- Website: www.obeclukovecek.cz

Lukoveček is a municipality and village in Zlín District in the Zlín Region of the Czech Republic. It has about 400 inhabitants.

Lukoveček lies approximately 10 kilometres (6 mi) north of Zlín and 250 km (160 mi) east of Prague.

== Demographics ==
Historical population
Year	Pop.	±%
1869	380	—
1880	400	+5.3%
1890	382	−4.5%
1900	377	−1.3%
1910	387	+2.7%
1921	373	−3.6%
1930	380	+1.9%
1950	404	+6.3%
1961	443	+9.7%
1970	441	−0.5%
1980	360	−18.4%
1991	344	−4.4%
2001	367	+6.7%
2011	405	+10.4%
2021	460	+13.6%
Source: Censuses
