= Komárov (Zlín District) =

- Municipality
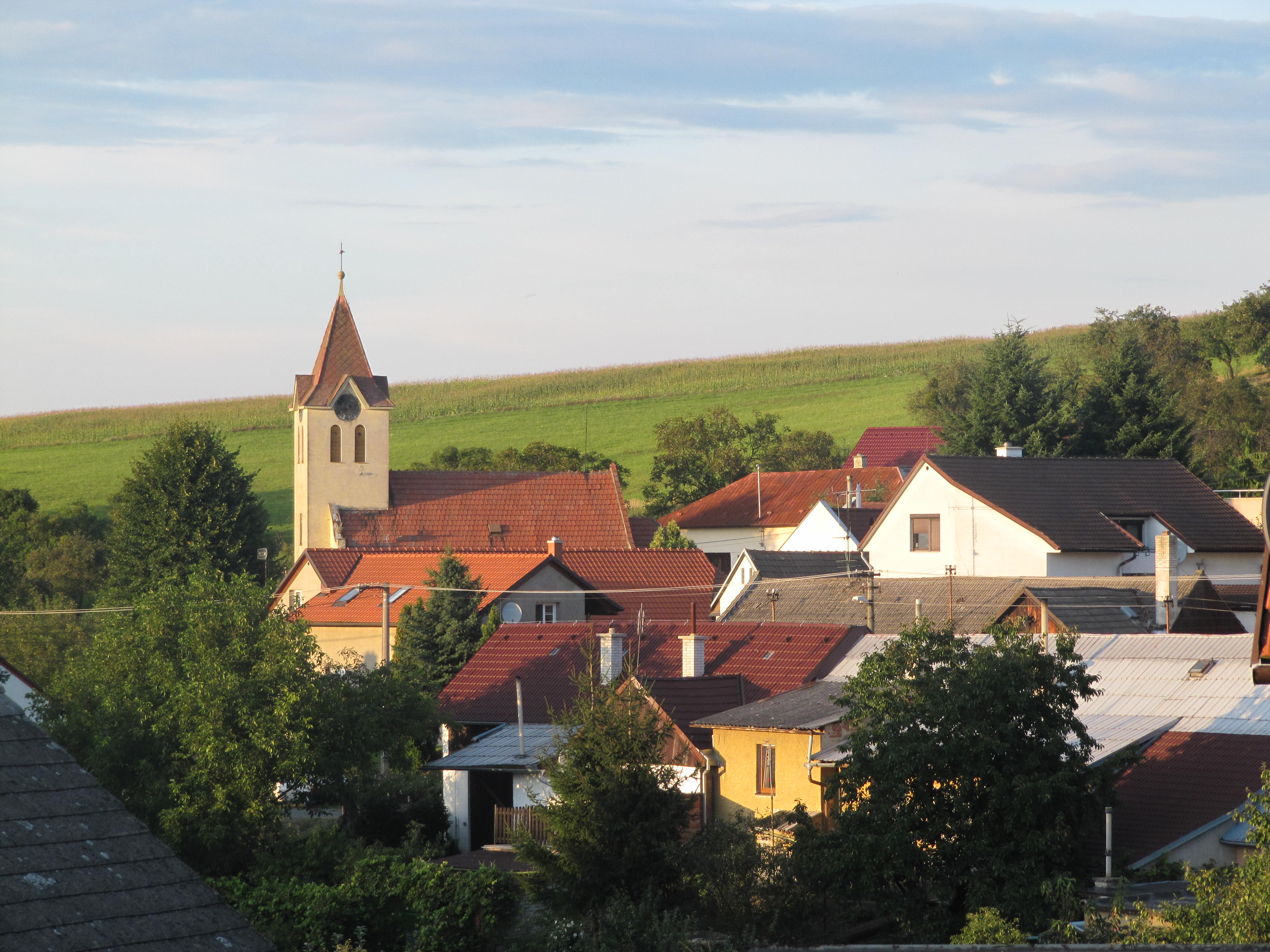
- General view

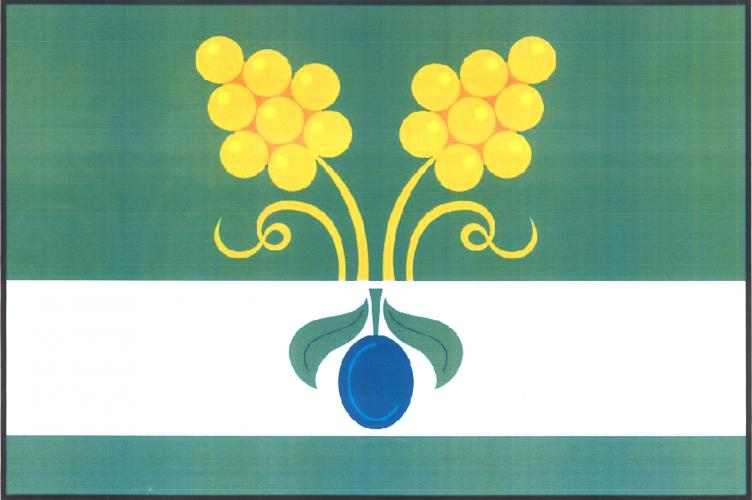
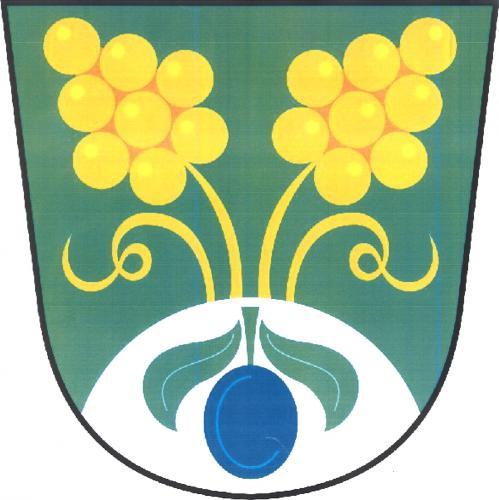
- Flag Coat of arms

- Location in the Czech Republic
- Coordinates: 49°9′2″N 17°34′8″E
- Country: Czech Republic
- Region: Zlín
- District: Zlín
- First mentioned: 1349

Area
  - Total: 7.62 km^{2} (2.94 sq mi)
- Elevation: 308 m (1,010 ft)

Population (2026-01-01)
  - Total: 312
  - Density: 40.9/km^{2} (106/sq mi)
- Time zone: UTC+1 (CET)
  - Summer (DST): UTC+2 (CEST)
- Postal code: 763 61
- Website: www.komarov-ou.cz

Komárov is a municipality and village in Zlín District in the Zlín Region of the Czech Republic. It has about 300 inhabitants.

Komárov lies approximately 12 kilometres (7 mi) south-west of Zlín and 250 km (160 mi) south-east of Prague.

== Demographics ==
Historical population
Year	Pop.	±%
1869	327	—
1880	393	+20.2%
1890	374	−4.8%
1900	440	+17.6%
1910	495	+12.5%
1921	484	−2.2%
1930	468	−3.3%
1950	490	+4.7%
1961	507	+3.5%
1970	507	+0.0%
1980	407	−19.7%
1991	329	−19.2%
2001	331	+0.6%
2011	324	−2.1%
2021	293	−9.6%
Source: Censuses
