= Petrůvka =

- Municipality
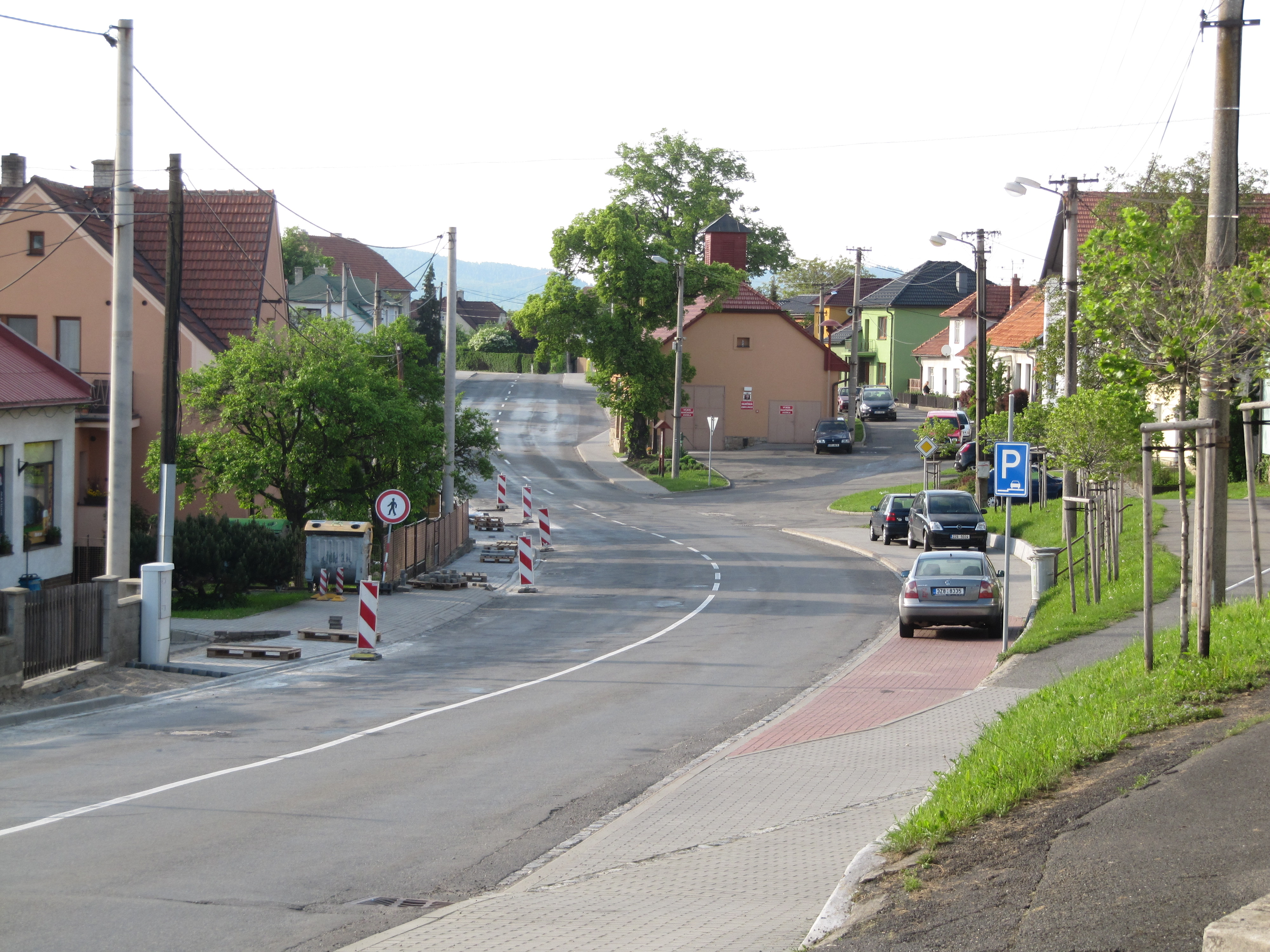
- Main street

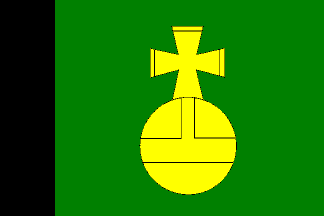
- Flag Coat of arms

- Location in the Czech Republic
- Coordinates: 49°6′18″N 17°48′36″E
- Country: Czech Republic
- Region: Zlín
- District: Zlín
- First mentioned: 1449

Area
  - Total: 7.01 km^{2} (2.71 sq mi)
- Elevation: 484 m (1,588 ft)

Population (2026-01-01)
  - Total: 318
  - Density: 45.4/km^{2} (117/sq mi)
- Time zone: UTC+1 (CET)
  - Summer (DST): UTC+2 (CEST)
- Postal code: 763 21
- Website: www.obecpetruvka.cz

Petrůvka is a municipality and village in Zlín District in the Zlín Region of the Czech Republic. It has about 300 inhabitants.

Petrůvka lies approximately 18 kilometres (11 mi) south-east of Zlín and 268 km (167 mi) south-east of Prague.

== Demographics ==
Historical population
Year	Pop.	±%
1869	358	—
1880	381	+6.4%
1890	354	−7.1%
1900	376	+6.2%
1910	370	−1.6%
1921	366	−1.1%
1930	376	+2.7%
1950	331	−12.0%
1961	374	+13.0%
1970	367	−1.9%
1980	358	−2.5%
1991	386	+7.8%
2001	350	−9.3%
2011	314	−10.3%
2021	305	−2.9%
Source: Censuses
