= Bratřejov =

- Municipality
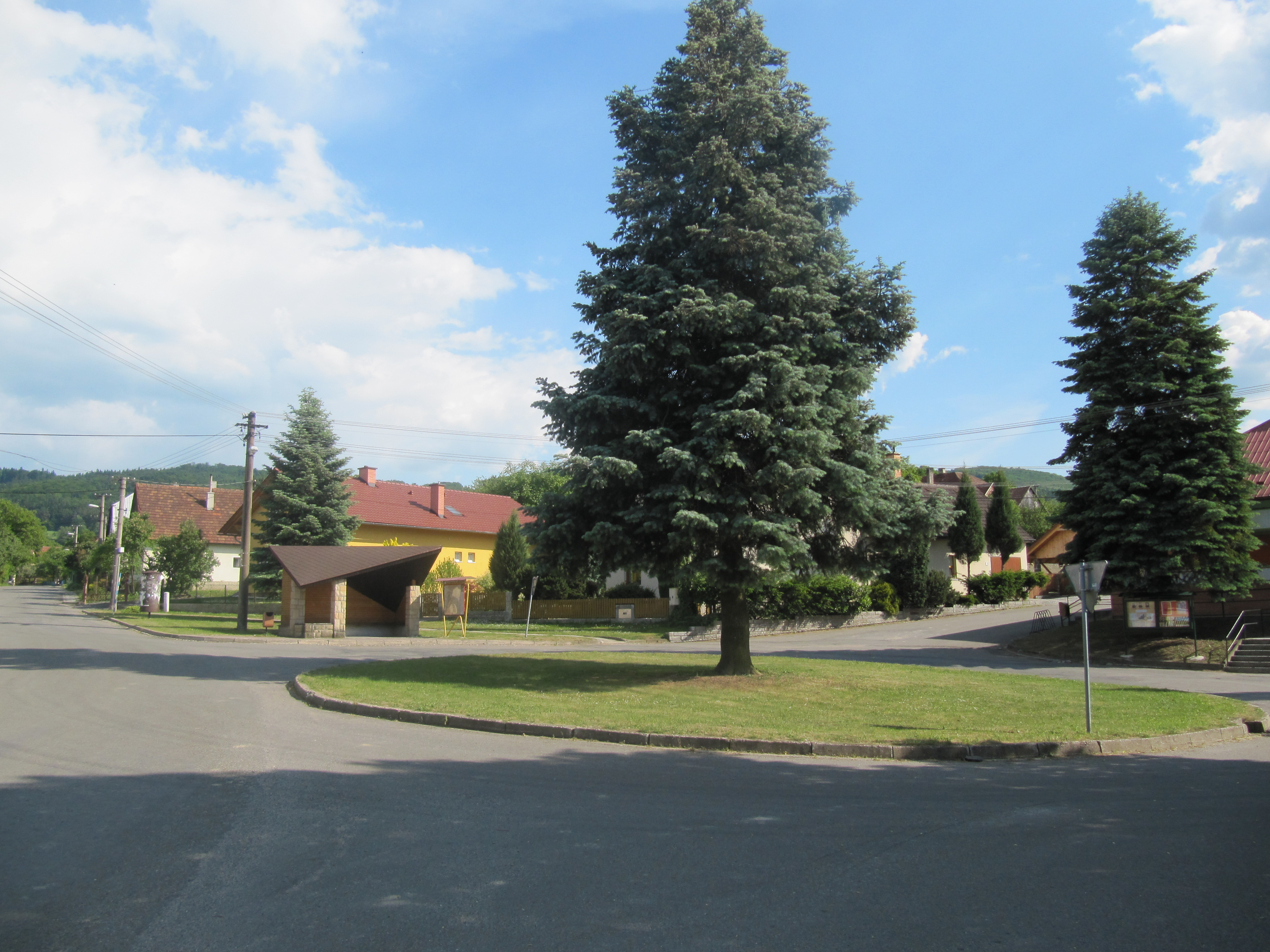
- Centre of Bratřejov

- Flag Coat of arms

- Location in the Czech Republic
- Coordinates: 49°13′21″N 17°54′48″E
- Country: Czech Republic
- Region: Zlín
- District: Zlín
- First mentioned: 1468

Area
  - Total: 11.96 km^{2} (4.62 sq mi)
- Elevation: 420 m (1,380 ft)

Population (2026-01-01)
  - Total: 778
  - Density: 65.1/km^{2} (168/sq mi)
- Time zone: UTC+1 (CET)
  - Summer (DST): UTC+2 (CEST)
- Postal code: 763 12
- Website: www.obec-bratrejov.cz

Bratřejov is a municipality and village in Zlín District in the Zlín Region of the Czech Republic. It has about 800 inhabitants.

Bratřejov lies approximately 19 kilometres (12 mi) east of Zlín and 270 km (170 mi) east of Prague.

== History ==
The first written mention of Bratřejov is from 1468.

== Demographics ==
Historical population
Year	Pop.	±%
1869	545	—
1880	630	+15.6%
1890	628	−0.3%
1900	681	+8.4%
1910	711	+4.4%
1921	750	+5.5%
1930	754	+0.5%
1950	804	+6.6%
1961	869	+8.1%
1970	879	+1.2%
1980	813	−7.5%
1991	754	−7.3%
2001	759	+0.7%
2011	760	+0.1%
2021	745	−2.0%
Source: Censuses
