= Taxis Ditch =

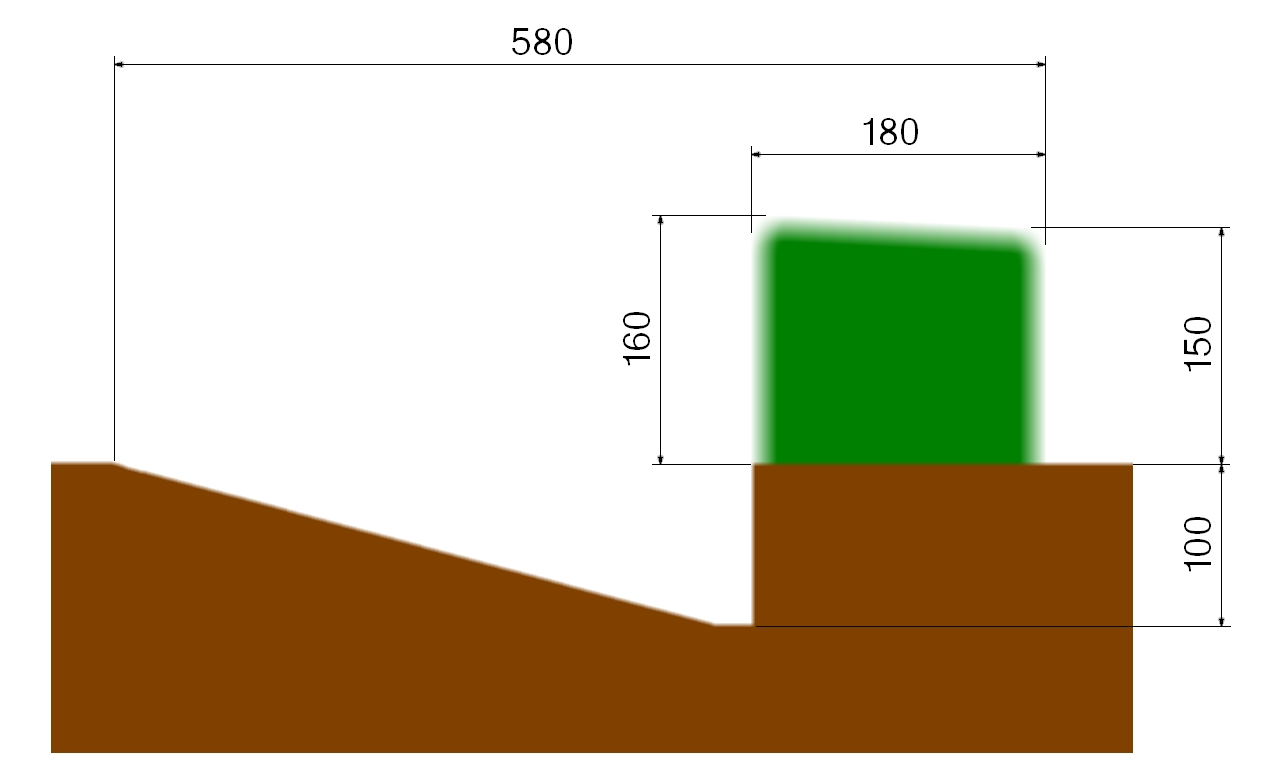
Taxis Ditch

The Taxis Ditch, also known simply as Taxis, is the fourth obstacle of the Velká pardubická and is the most famous jump in the race. It is named after Prince Egon Thurn-Taxis. It is the only obstacle at the Pardubice racecourse that is jumped only once a year and in a single race.

== Early History of Taxis ==
The Velká pardubická, was first held in 1874, was founded by Prince Emil Egon Fürstenberg [cs] and Counts Maxmilián Ugarte and Carl Trauttmansdorff . After the first year, a discussion broke out about its cancellation, which was demanded especially by younger riders led by Emil Fürstenberg. However, their opponents insisted on keeping the ditch. Prince Egon Thurn-Taxis [cs] is said to have said at the time: "Gentlemen, I will never make this jump again, and as I look around me, neither will you. So I see no reason why we should cancel it and make things easier for someone." Egon Thurn-Taxis had not worked in Pardubice since 1871, so this is possibly a fictional statement, attributed to various people over time. Princes Alexander, Egon and Max Egon Thurn-Taxis have been suggested. However, Major Miloš Svoboda, historian of the Velká pardubická and its two-time winner, has proven that the sentence was uttered by Egon (in German his full name is Egon Maximilian Lamoral Prinz von Thurn und Taxis).

These are other versions of Taxis statement:

- "Your Majesty, neither you nor I will overcome this obstacle anymore, and therefore there is no reason why we should eliminate it and make it easier for someone." (Miloš Svoboda, 100 Years of the VPS, p. 180 – the author states that this is a free paraphrase of Thurn-Taxis's statement; by addressing "Your Majesty", the prince addressed Prince Emil Fürstenberg)
- "Gentlemen, I will never overcome this jump again, and as I look around me, neither will you. So I see no reason why we should cancel it and make things easier for someone." (Martin Cáp, The Velká pardubická Battle for Horses and Taxis, Hospodářské noviny, October 13, 2008)
- "Clearly, neither you nor I will overcome this obstacle, and therefore there is no reason why we should eliminate it and make it easier for someone." (Code tn.cz / jvl, tn.nova.cz)
- "Gentlemen, I will never overcome this leap again. So I don't see any reason why we should cancel it and make things easier for someone." (Martin Prachař, Jiří Jakoubek – Lidové noviny, November 8, 2008)

Eighteen years later, in 1892, the obstacle was officially named after Taxis for the first time. Taxis ditch is now only jumped once a year at the Velká Pardubická . Shortly after its foundation, however, it was part of the courses of other races. In 1912 and 1913, the race was run twice on the same course under the names Pardubická steeplechase armády and Velká Pardubická .

== Obstacle Parameters ==
Originally , Taxis was a 200 cm deep and 500 cm long ditch, hidden behind a 150 cm high and long hedge, which replaced the wicker obstacle from 1874 sometime before 1892. The horse and rider had to overcome almost eight meters to safely jump back onto the level ground. The horse had to transfer its weight to all four legs when landing, otherwise it would fall. In addition, the ditch behind the fence could surprise and frighten the horse, as could the depth of the obstacle, from which the horse had difficulty getting out.

Today's Taxis ditch is shorter and its landing edge has been softened. The hedge is 150 cm high and 180 cm long at the jump. Its back edge is ten cms higher and is followed by a meter-deep ditch - the abyss is therefore 260 cm deep compared to the previous 360 cm. Its length is 400 cm and its bottom rises towards the landing area. For horses, it represents an obstacle 150–160 cm high and 580 cm long, respectively. wide (compared to the previous 650 cm).

== Training on Taxis ==
It is possible to train with horses at the Pardubice racecourse, but Taxis' ditch is not used for training. The two exceptions were a bet before World War I and a permit for the rider Kržová with the gelding Santos in 1985. Her attempt ended unsuccessfully. After 1946 , there was a sign in front of Taxis prohibiting his training jumping. In recent years, the sign has not been there, but it is considered a generally known rule. After 1989, no one asked the board of directors of the Pardubice racecourse for Taxis to practice jumping.

Training for Taxis is different for each trainer. In an interview for the website tn-sport.cz, trainer and jockey Josef Váňa described the most drastic method of training horses to overcome Taxis from the times before November 1989. At the racetrack in Rostov, Russian trainer Laskov forced horses to jump over barbed wire to gain enough height to overcome Taxis. Out of two hundred horses, ten survived the training.

== Taxis through the years ==
- 1874 – the first edition of Velká pardubická Steeplechase, the gelding The Vet was the first horse to climb the hedge of this obstacle
- 1875 – called the "main" or "fenced ditch", the names "large ditch" and "tribune jump" were also used
- 1877 – after the modifications to the obstacles that took place in the years 1874 – 1877 , their definitive form was determined; the appearance of Taxis has since only seen cosmetic changes and the wickerwork was replaced by a hedge
- 1888 – the first documented modification of the ditch with a hedge planted in one of the previous years; this form is also the basis for the current appearance of the obstacle; the hedge replaced the original wicker obstacle
- Late 1880s – the popular name "Taxis's Moat" was widely used for the "Main Moat"
- 1892 – it was first described in the press as "Taxis's Ditch", instead of a wicker fence, a hedge about 120 cm high was already growing there
- 1927 – the first horse reportedly died on Taxis
- 1928 – spectators at Taxis's moat broke through the military cordon and caused chaos
- 1929 – obstacles modified, especially Taxis, Irish Bench and Snake Moat
- 1937 – German favorite Herold with rider Oskar Lengnik fell on Taxisa; Lengnik with a broken collarbone remounted, finished third and collapsed in pain at the finish line and was taken to the Pardubice hospital; this moment helped the mare Norma under Lata Brandisová to win
- 1946 – after the war, the obstacles were repaired and the course changed. From this year, Taxis' ditch was marked with a "jumping ban" during permitted horse training on the track (the marking is no longer used today)
- 1952 – the horses Salvator with rider Werner and Atom II with rider Kostka climbed through the Taxis hedge (for the first time since 1874 )
- 1964 – the carelessly maintained hedge of Taxis's ditch grew to almost 160 cm
- 1967 – a photograph of the Taxis falls went around the world, in the foreground of which the threatening connection of the stallion Barvinok with the rider Smetanin with a nylon rope was visible (so that the horse would not run away after the fall); since then, any fixed connection between the rider and the horse has been prohibited.
- 1971 – rider Kňazík and Nestor successfully jumped behind Taxis without the reins in their hands
- 1984 – mass fall of eleven (according to some sources fourteen) horses on Taxis
- 1985 – Training on Taxis allowed to the rider Kržová with the gelding Santos; the jump ended unsuccessfully
- 1992 – animal rights demonstrators stormed the track during the Velká pardubická; their action was motivated, among other things, by the bad reputation of the Taxis Ditch, which sparked the “fight for Taxis” – a debate about its preservation or abolition.
- 1993 – Taxis' ditch was modified, the hedge was lowered by about 20 cm, the ditch was partially filled in (from 200 cm to 100 cm) and the angle of the landing area was reduced.

== List of horses fatally injured at Taxis ==
A total of 26 horses died at the obstacle as of 2025. The list includes the names and years of the Velká pardubická horses that have been traced. However, some sources have given higher numbers and the number as of 2020 could be as high as 31 horses. Since the adjustments in 1993 and then in 2021, the number has dropped significantly.

1. Doyen – October 9, 1927
2. Beetle – October 14, 1956
3. Visa – October 16, 1960
4. Div – October 11, 1964
5. Wheelbarrow – October 11, 1964
6. Thoughtful – October 8, 1967
7. Blue – October 12, 1969
8. Vaga – October 12, 1969
9. Lebanon – October 11, 1970
10. Ticket – October 11, 1970
11. Kostrava – October 10, 1971
12. Rio – October 10, 1971
13. Sandra II – October 11, 1975
14. The Trick – October 9, 1977
15. Emanuel l – October 14, 1984
16. Football – October 14, 1984
17. Lozorno – October 12, 1986
18. Torpha – October 8, 1989
19. Gajsan – October 8, 1989
20. Format – October 14, 1990
21. Pause – October 13, 1991
22. Cieszymir – October 14, 2007
23. Zulejka – October 12, 2014
24. Vicody – October 15, 2018
25. Sottovento – October 11, 2020
26. Stuke – October 8, 2023

== Quotes about Taxis ==
- "A taxi is an obstacle like any other." (Jana Nová)
- "The obstacle, which we now call the Taxis ditch, made the Velka Pardubická more famous perhaps than the race itself." (Miloš Svoboda, historian and two-time winner of the Velka Pardubická )
- "Just the name Taxis scares many people." (Pavel Liebich, three-time winner of the Velká pardubická, and in three consecutive years)
- "He is unpredictable." (Peter Gehm, four-time winner of the Velká pardubická)
- "I had the biggest problem at Taxis, Maskul bounced close in front of him, we had a lot to do. But we managed the situation and the path to my second victory in Pardubice was open." (Peter Gehm , four-time winner of the Velká pardubická)
- "What does it feel like to jump over Taxis? It's like jumping out of a plane and your parachute doesn't open." (Kamil Kuchovský, fourteen-time participant in the Velká pardubická)
- "The horse gets smaller in front of Taxis, but the heck gets bigger. Then you see the hole, then the blow comes. Then you wake up. And in a year you go there again." (Josef Karásek, former steeplechase rider)
- "There have been some dramas over the years. I've seen Taxis jump more than fifty times." (Rudolf Deyl Sr.)
- "The Taxis ditch is the landmark of the entire race. It is there that the equestrian field is sorted." (Rudolf Deyl Sr.)
- "It's strange, but in the sixties, riders didn't attach as much importance to Taxis as they did to the Great Moat. More of them crashed there." (Rudolf Deyl Sr.)
- "The recipe for Taxis? It's simple: if possible, go in the peak so that you don't jump close to another horse and thus avoid a collision over or behind the obstacle. The main thing is to have a good pace! I know, I said it like a cooking recipe, but it really looks like this. Taxis are best jumped in the first third from the left." (Eva Palyzová , won 2× second place in Velká Pardubická)
- "Just because a horse and rider can beat Taxis doesn't necessarily mean they are good." (Pavel Liebich , three-time winner of the Velká pardubická , three years in a row)
- "When flying over Taxis, the horse covers a distance of about ten meters. It's really a flight." (Josef Váňa , eight-time winner of the Velká pardubická)
- "The lack of discipline of some riders does more harm than the difficulty of the obstacle." (This is what Pavel Liebich , three-time winner of the Velká pardubická , said about the falls at Taxis, in three consecutive years)
- "Even horses with poor jumping qualities are able to jump Taxis well if they are accompanied by excellent riders. If the opposite is the case, everything tends to go wrong." (Václav Čermák, trainer of the winners of the Velká pardubická Festival and Sagar, who won three times in a row)
- "The Taxis is the biggest and hardest obstacle I have ever jumped in my life. And I'm afraid I've never been more terrified of anything than the Taxis." (Christopher Collins, English amateur rider, winner of the Velká pardubická in 1973)
- "The obstacles in the Velká pardubická course are terrifying in their variety, but none are insurmountable in themselves, not even Taxis." (George Goring)
- "If a rider overcomes Taxis, and overcomes him well, it is a psychological injection. He says to himself: the worst is behind me." (Eva Palyzová , won second place twice in Velká Pardubická )
- "The Taxi is a difficult obstacle, but it can be jumped with a great feeling, at least for me, very well." (Václav Chaloupka , four-time winner of the Velká pardubická)
- "It must be a great feeling to beat Taxis." (Helmut Eder, Austrian amateur rider) "Maybe I'll be lucky enough to jump Taxis someday - but only with a well-prepared horse." (Juan de Cuellar, Spanish amateur rider)
- "I reject the idea that Taxis is a horse graveyard. An experienced rider and a well-prepared horse that can jump can handle Taxis." (Josef Váňa , eight-time winner of the Velká pardubická)
