= Josef Váňa =

Czech steeplechase jockey (born 1952)

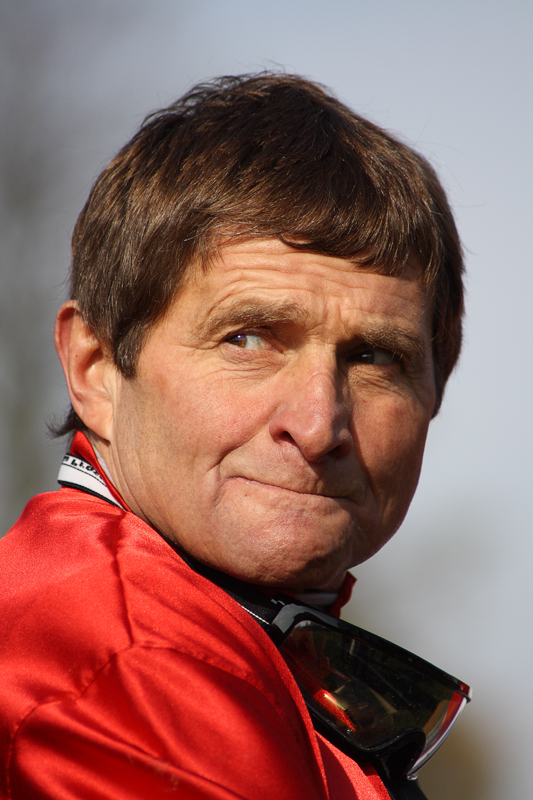
Josef Váňa

Josef Váňa (born 20 October 1952) is a Czech steeplechase jockey, horse breeder and trainer. As the eight-time winner of the Velká pardubická steeplechase, he is considered one of the greatest personalities of the horse racing sport.

In 2016 he unsuccessfully ran for a seat in Czech Senate as candidate of ANO 2011. In 2024, he assumed the seat of Jana Mračková Vildumetzová in the Chamber of Deputies of the Czech Republic after she was elected as mayor of Karlovy Vary. Váňa successfully defended his seat in the 2025 Czech parliamentary election.

== Biography ==
Váňa was born and spent his childhood is Slopné in the Zlín Region. He began his career as a horse breeder and keeper in Tlumačov. Later he moved to Hrubý Jeseník, where he worked as a construction worker at the Praděd TV tower and administrator of a ski center. He took part in his first horse race in 1979 in Boskovice with a mare Kalina. It was also the first win of his career. At the age of 28 he resumed his horse racing activities in Czechoslovakia and Germany and soon after that, in 1985, he competed in his first Velká pardubická steeplechase with Paramon. He finished second.

Váňa won his first Velká pardubická steeplechase in 1987, on a Czech racehorse Železník. He managed to finish the race in 9 minutes 56.13 sec. and became the first who finished the race under 10 minutes. Váňa, together with Železník, also won Velká pardubická in 1988, 1989, 1991. In 1997 he achieved his fifth victory on Vronsky. Váňa won Velká pardubická on Tiumen three times in a row in 2009, in 2010 and in 2011 (at the age of 58). In addition to his eight wins in the saddle, he also won Velká pardubická ten times as a trainer.

According to the statistics of the Czech Jockey Club, Váňa competed in 631 races with 183 wins. During his career, he suffered several serious injuries. According to his own words, he "broke almost every bone in his body". The most serious injury he suffered was in June 1994 in Germany Iffezheim, when he fell at the first fence. He managed to overcome the clinical death and two months after it he competed in his next race.

== Major racing wins ==
- Velká pardubická steeplechase
  - with Železník (1987, 1988, 1989, 1991)
  - with Vronsky (1997)
  - with Tiumen (2009, 2010, 2011)
