= Slopné =

- Municipality
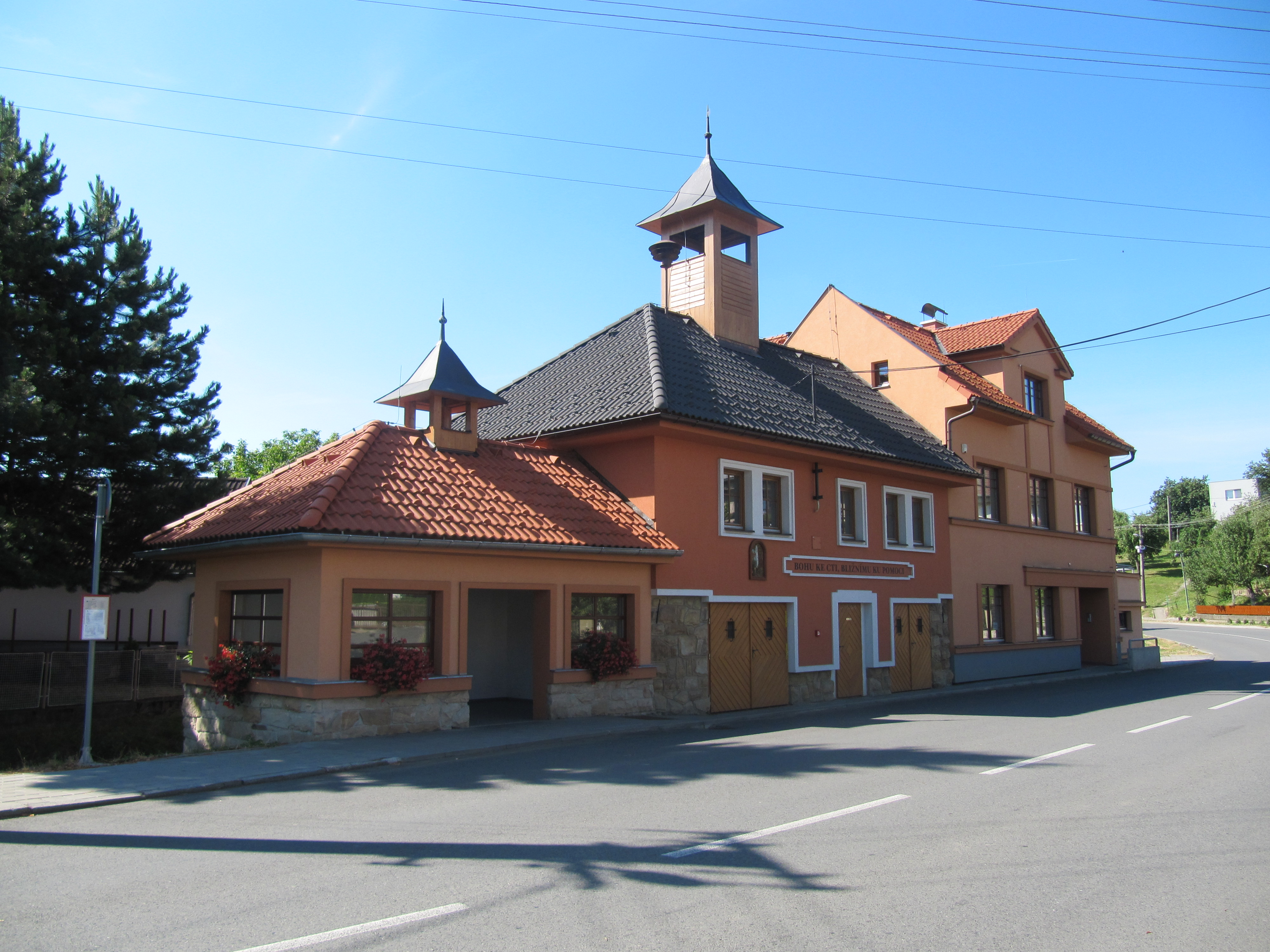
- Fire station

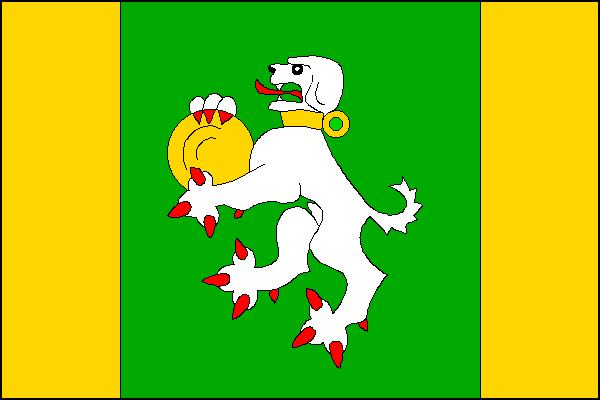
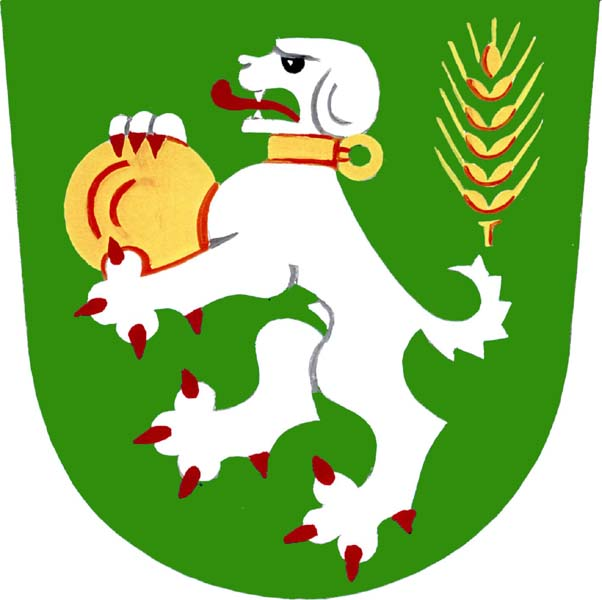
- Flag Coat of arms

- Location in the Czech Republic
- Coordinates: 49°9′25″N 17°50′50″E
- Country: Czech Republic
- Region: Zlín
- District: Zlín
- First mentioned: 1261

Area
  - Total: 9.63 km^{2} (3.72 sq mi)
- Elevation: 349 m (1,145 ft)

Population (2026-01-01)
  - Total: 545
  - Density: 56.6/km^{2} (147/sq mi)
- Time zone: UTC+1 (CET)
  - Summer (DST): UTC+2 (CEST)
- Postal code: 763 23
- Website: www.slopne.cz

Slopné is a municipality and village in Zlín District in the Zlín Region of the Czech Republic. It has about 500 inhabitants.

Slopné lies approximately 16 kilometres (10 mi) south-east of Zlín and 269 km (167 mi) south-east of Prague.

== Demographics ==
Historical population
Year	Pop.	±%
1869	529	—
1880	539	+1.9%
1890	515	−4.5%
1900	577	+12.0%
1910	594	+2.9%
1921	602	+1.3%
1930	584	−3.0%
1950	635	+8.7%
1961	711	+12.0%
1970	693	−2.5%
1980	660	−4.8%
1991	615	−6.8%
2001	584	−5.0%
2011	581	−0.5%
2021	541	−6.9%
Source: Censuses

== Notable people ==
- Josef Váňa (born 1952), jockey

== Twin towns – sister cities ==
Slopné is twinned with:

- Slopná, Slovakia
