= Velká pardubická =

Coordinates: 50.0219°N 15.7460°E

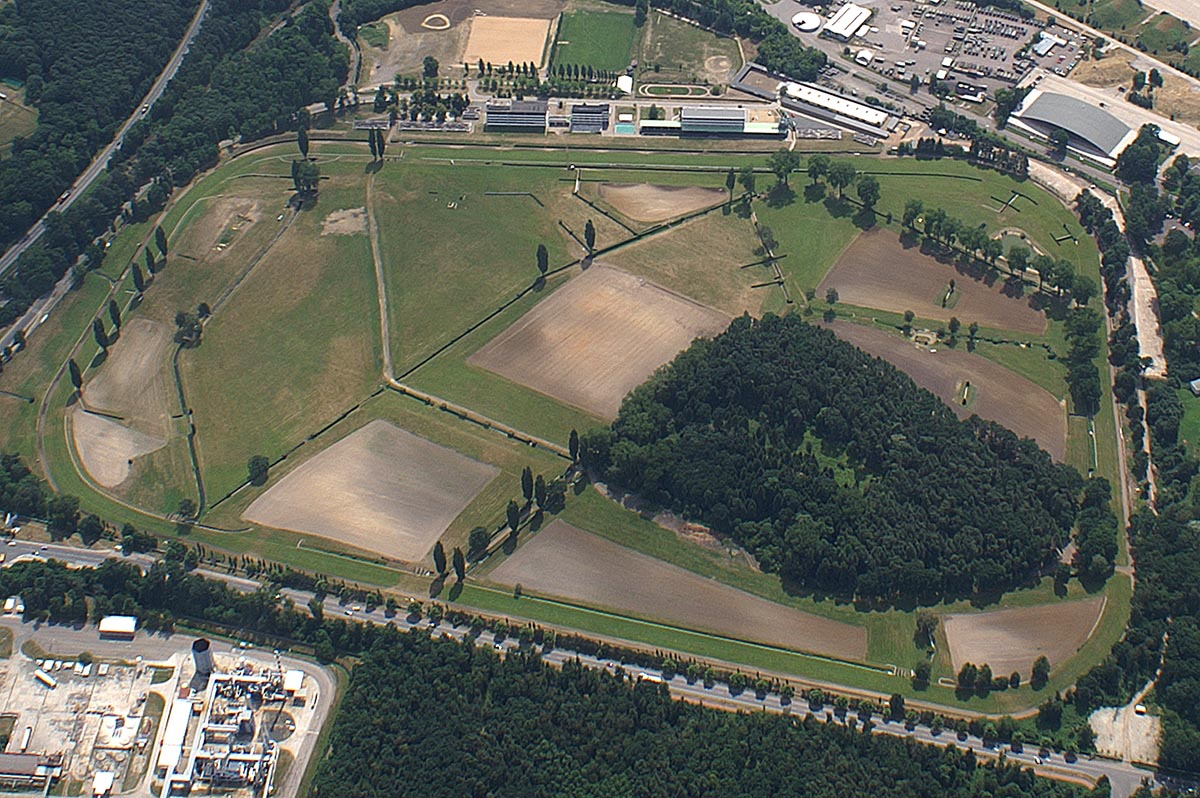
- Racecourse in Pardubice
- Location: Pardubice, Czech Republic
- Inaugurated: 5 November 1874; 152 years ago
- Race type: Steeplechase
- Website: zavodistepardubice.cz

Race information
- Distance: 6.9 km (4 mi 506 yd)
- Surface: Turf
- Qualification: Six-years-old and up

Velká pardubická (Grand Pardubice Steeplechase) is a cross-country (point to point) steeplechase run in Pardubice, Czech Republic since 1874. It takes place every year on the second Sunday in October.

The length of the steeplechase is 6.9 km (34 furlongs), with 31 obstacles. It usually takes 9–10 minutes to finish the course; the record is 8:56.01 set by Ribelino in 2015.

Horses starting in the race must be at least six years old (before 2009, the minimum age was seven years); Czech horses must qualify by finishing at least one of four qualifying races during the season.

== History ==
The race was first run in 1874 in Pardubice, a town long known in the horse racing world, as some trainers and jockeys from England came there to work. The current steeplechase course was established in 1856, however the course first took its present-day form in the years just after World War II.

The course of the race has been changed several times, most recently in 1998 when the direction of the final phase of the race was changed to accommodate the new grandstand. The surface of the racecourse is mainly grass, but one-quarter of the race is run through ploughed fields, which used to take almost half of the race in the past. Some obstacles have also been changed, mostly to improve safety, although the difficulty of the race is said to have suffered as a result.

== Obstacles ==
Horses must negotiate a total of 31 obstacles. These are:

- 1 – Hedge. (1.2m)
- 2 – Hedge with ditch. (1.3m, with a 60 cm ditch on the other side)
- 3 – Small water jump. (3m long)
- 4 – Taxis ditch. (This is the most famous obstacle in the race, and it is jumped just once. 28 horses have died at this obstacle. In the past it consisted of a 2 m deep and 5 m long ditch hidden behind a 1.5 m high hedge. It was changed before the 1994 race to be a 1 m deep and 4 m long ditch with a 1.5 m high hedge. For the 2021 race the obstacle will have a 0.75 m deep ditch and 5 m long ditch with a 1.35 m to 1.45 m high hedge. This obstacle is used only for the Velká pardubická, and horses are not permitted to use it for training.)
- 5 – Irish bank. (This unusual obstacle requires the horses to shimmy up and down a steep artificial bank.)
- 6 – Popkovice ditch. (1.3m hedge with a 2m long ditch on the other side)
- 7 – French jump. A pair of closely spaced hedges, 1.2m and 1.3m in height, which must be jumped as one.
- 8 & 9 – Little gardens. A pair of hedges, 1.25m and 1.3m in height, which are jumped in quick succession.
- 10 – English jump. (1.2m hedge with a ditch on the takeoff side)
- 10a – Extended Taxis ditch. (Small hedge, about 1.1m tall, which joins with the main taxis ditch)
- 11 – Hedge with ditch. (1.3m, with a ditch on the landing side)
- 12 – Hedge. (1.2 m high and 1.3 m wide hedge with a 60 cm. The landing side is 0.5 m lower than the takeoff side)
- 13 – Hedge. (1.3 m high and wide hedge that's 0.8 m high)
- 14 – Popler's Jump. (0.8 m high double railing. It is named after the famous interwar rider and two-time winner of the Grand Cpt. Rudolf Popler, who died on this jump in 1932. In 1991, Železník fell here, but jockey Josef Váňa senior remounted and Železník went on to claim his fourth victory.)
- 15 – Drop Bank. (In front of the stands. It is a two-meter drop.)
- 16 – Stone Wall. (Stone wall in front of the stands 0.8 m wide and 0.85 m high wall, which is approached from a plowed field.)
- 17 – Water Trough. (The largest water obstacle in the race. It is used to be 2 m deep but since the 1990s it has been changed to be 4.5 m wide and 0.7 m lower rebound compared to the original rebound.)
- 18 – Large Moat. (In the past the second most feared obstacle behind Taxis Ditch now 4 m wide and 0.45 m deep.)
- 19 – Little Taxis drop. (The last of the three 'Taxis' ditch on the course. The hedge is 1.5 m high, 2 m wide and there is a 1.7 m ditch on the landing side.)
- 20 & 21 – Great gardens. (A pair of hedges, 1.25m and 1.3m in height, which are jumped in quick succession.)
- 22 – Open brook. (A simple ditch with a white bounce beam which in the past where not there which lead to horses not seeing the brook. The brook is 3m wide and 0.9 m deep.)
- 23 – Steeplechase obstacle. (Steeplechase jumps have replaced wicker obstacles, which are no longer jumped. This fence is 1.3 m high and 0.6 m wide.)
- 24 – "At the hangar" Hedge. (Named after it closeness to hangars by a nearby airport. It is a 1.3 m high and wide hedge. 0.6 m in front of it is an 0.8 m high bouncing crossbar.)
- 25 – Big English jump. (0.5 m high and 1.6 m wide hedge, 0.6 m in front of it stands an 0.8 m high bounce beam. The difficulty of the obstacle is the landing, because the landing area is 40 cm higher than the takeoff side. Often causes problems in the wet.)
- 26 – American post and rails. (2.4 m wide ditch with a 0.5 m high bounce beam.)
- 27 – Havel's Jump. (1.4 m high and 1.9 m wide hedge with an 0.8 m high bounce beam at a distance of 0.5 m in front of the fence, followed by a 2.5 m wide shallow ditch. The difficulty of the jump is mainly due to its closeness to the end of the race.)
- 28 – Steeplechase obstacle. (1.3 m high and 0.6 m wide)
- 29 – Steeplechase obstacle. (1.3 m high and 0.6 m wide)
- 30 – Steeplechase obstacle. (1.3 m high and 0.6 m wide)
Překážky

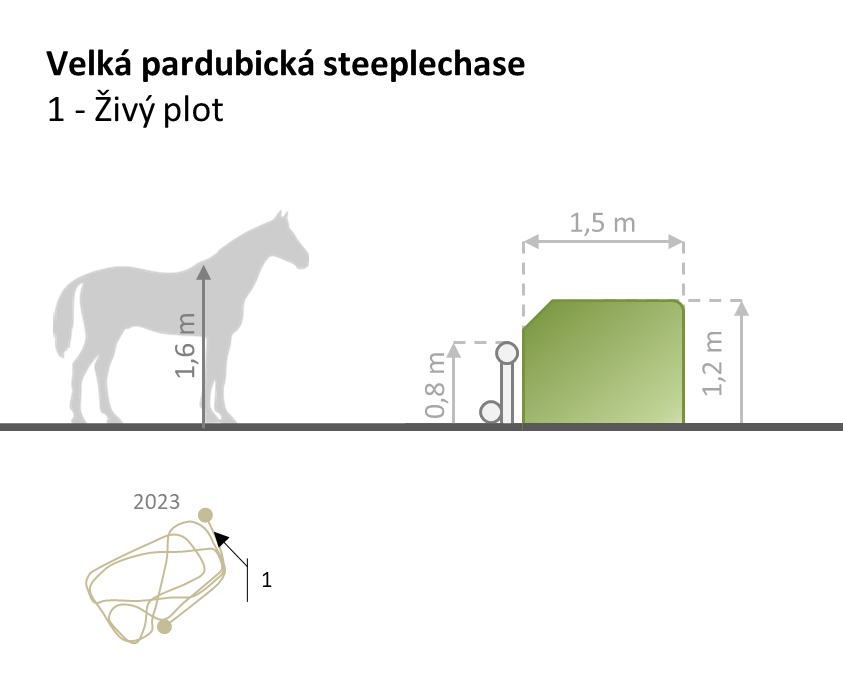
1. Hedge

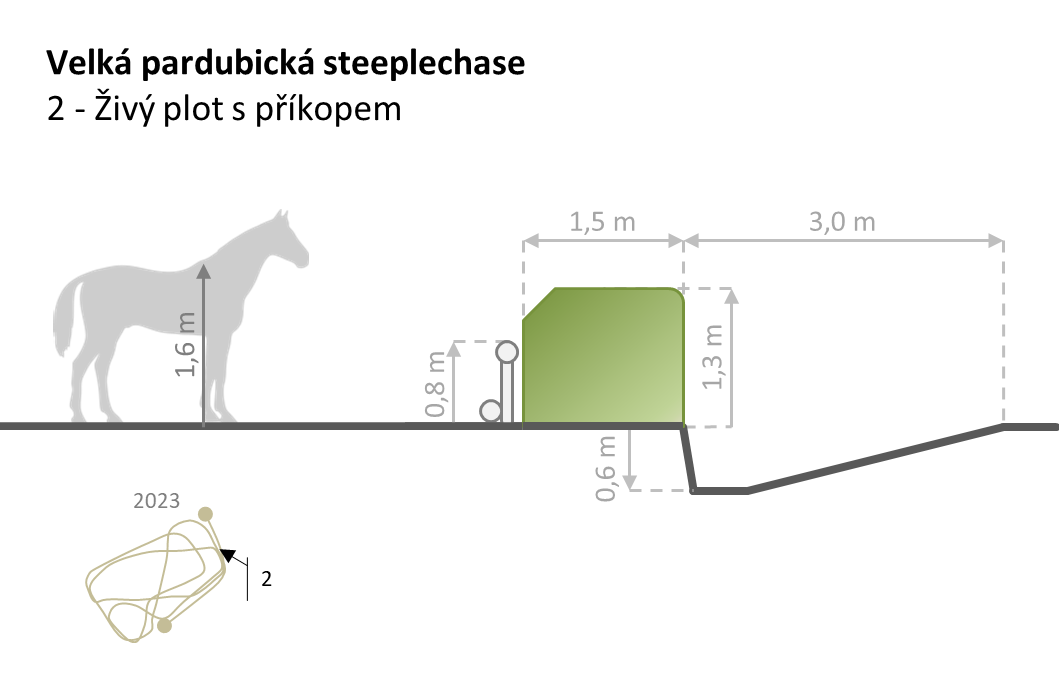
2. Hedge with ditch

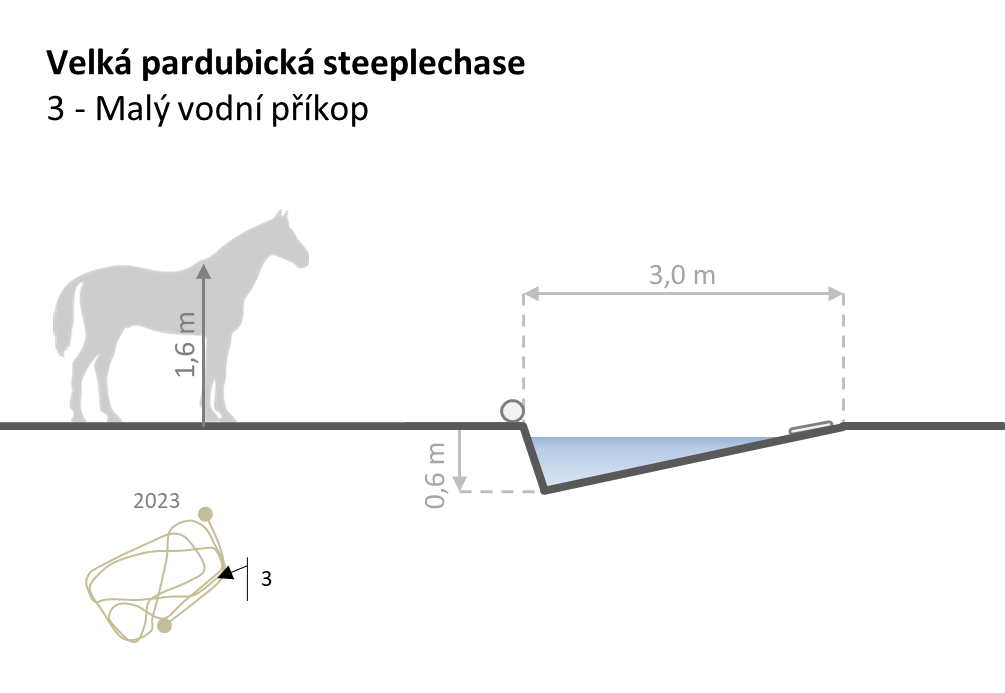
3. Small water jump

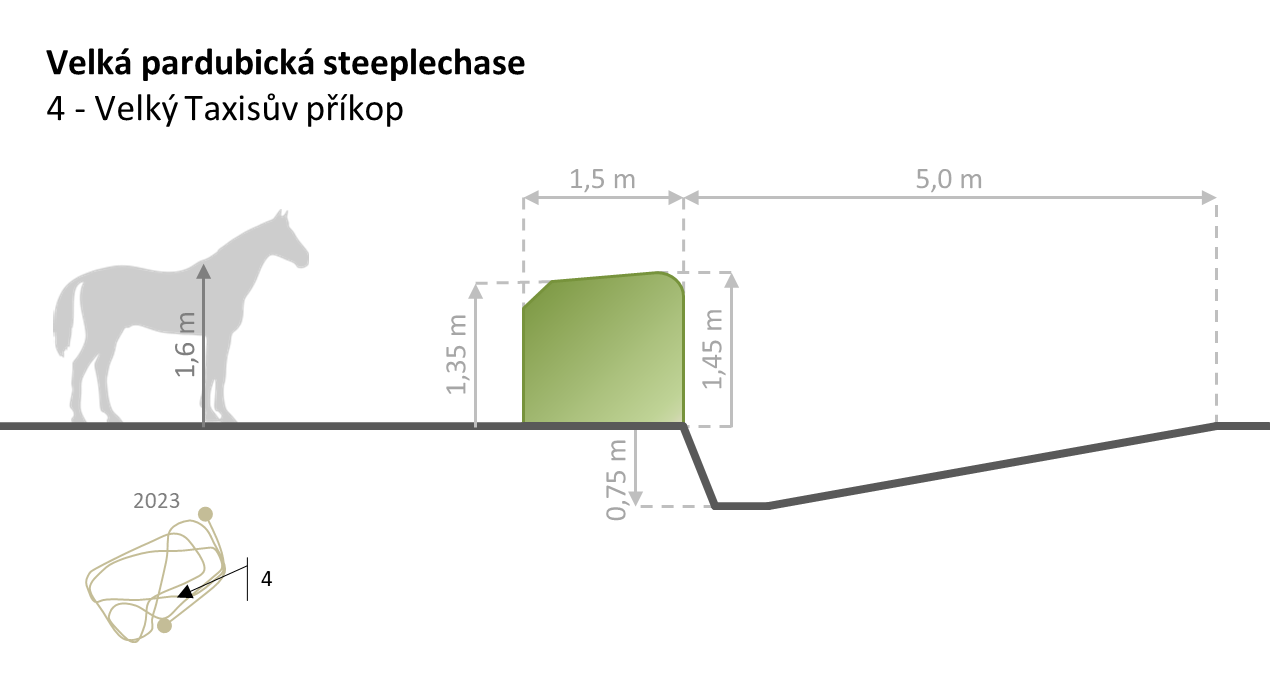
4. Taxis ditch

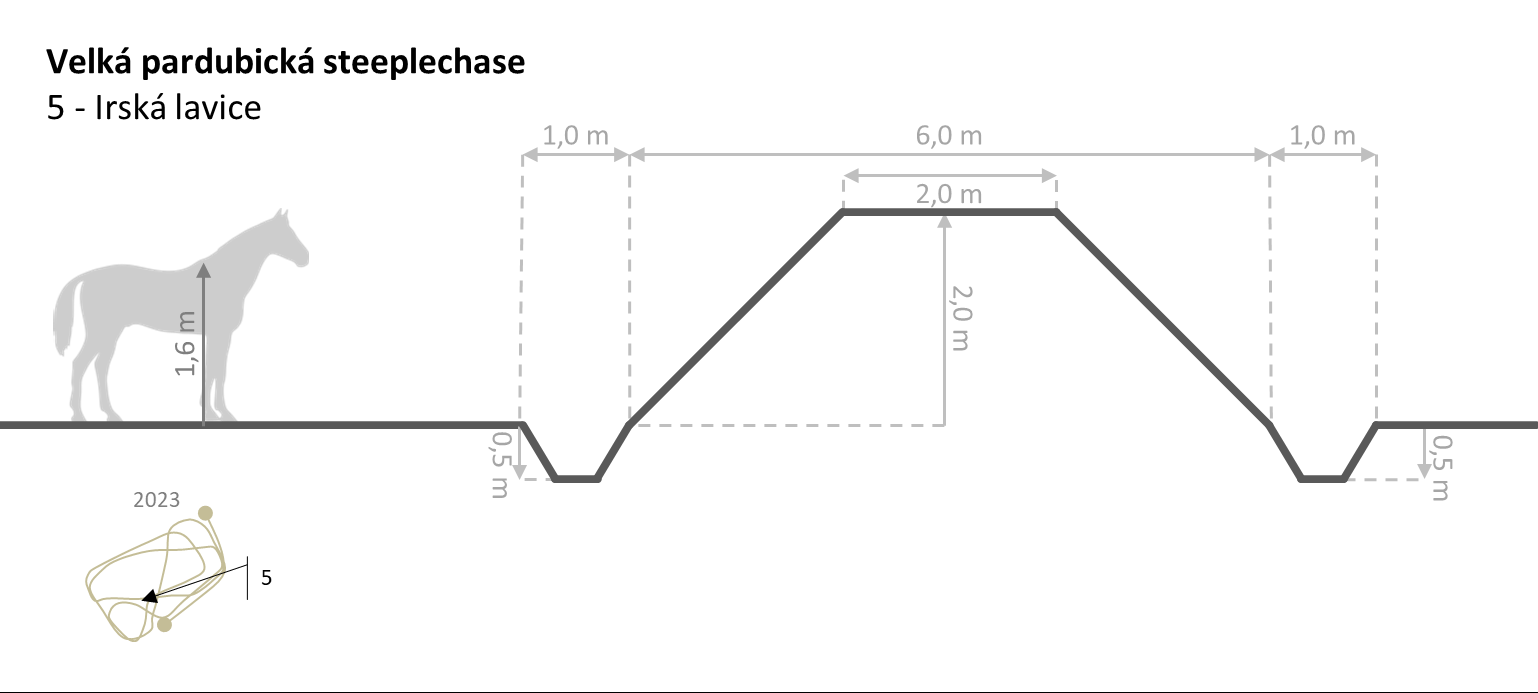
5. Irish bank

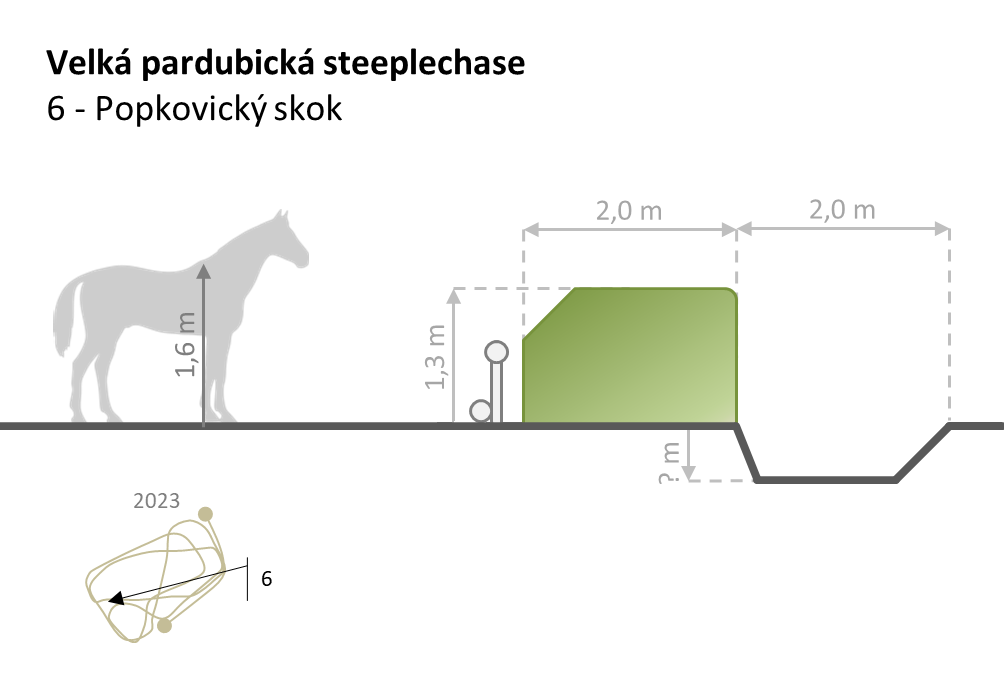
6. Popkovice ditch

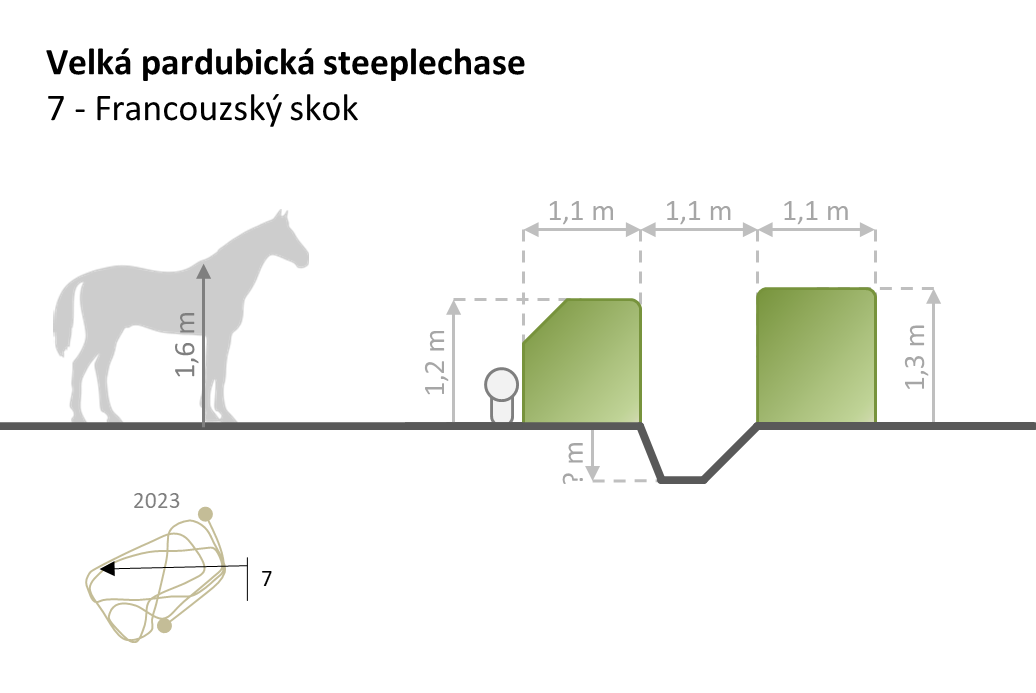
7. French jump

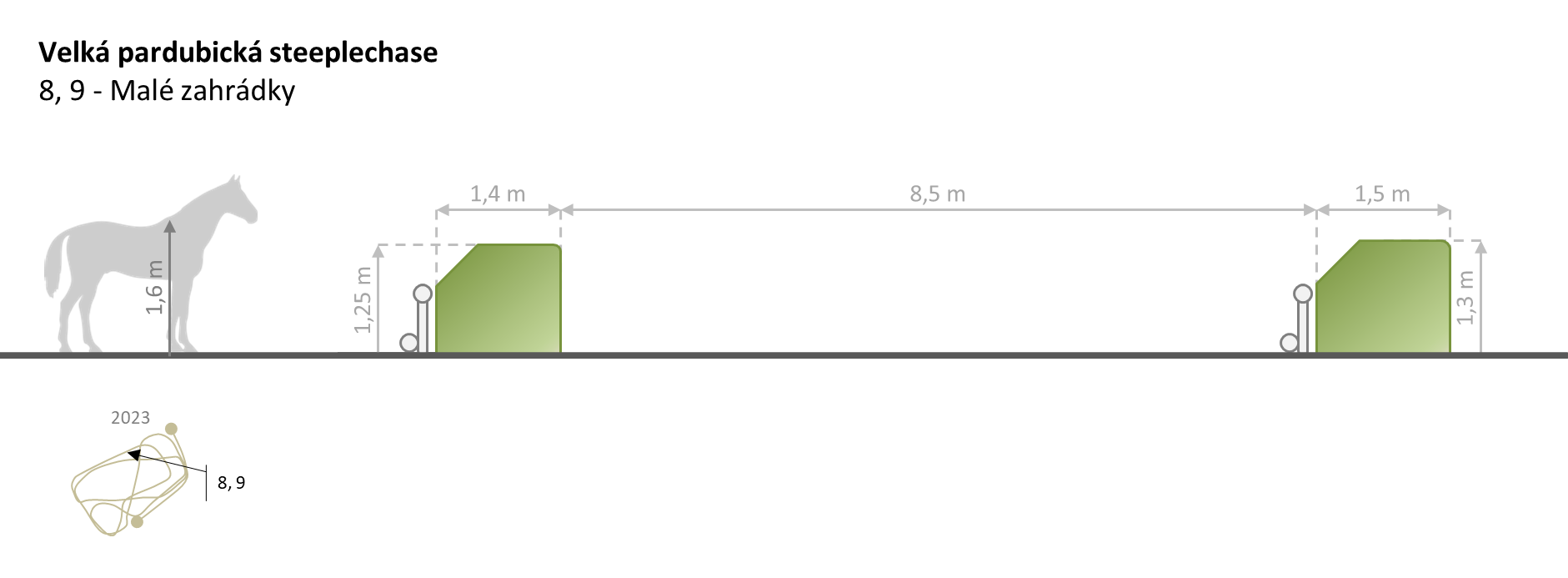
8 & 9. Little gardens

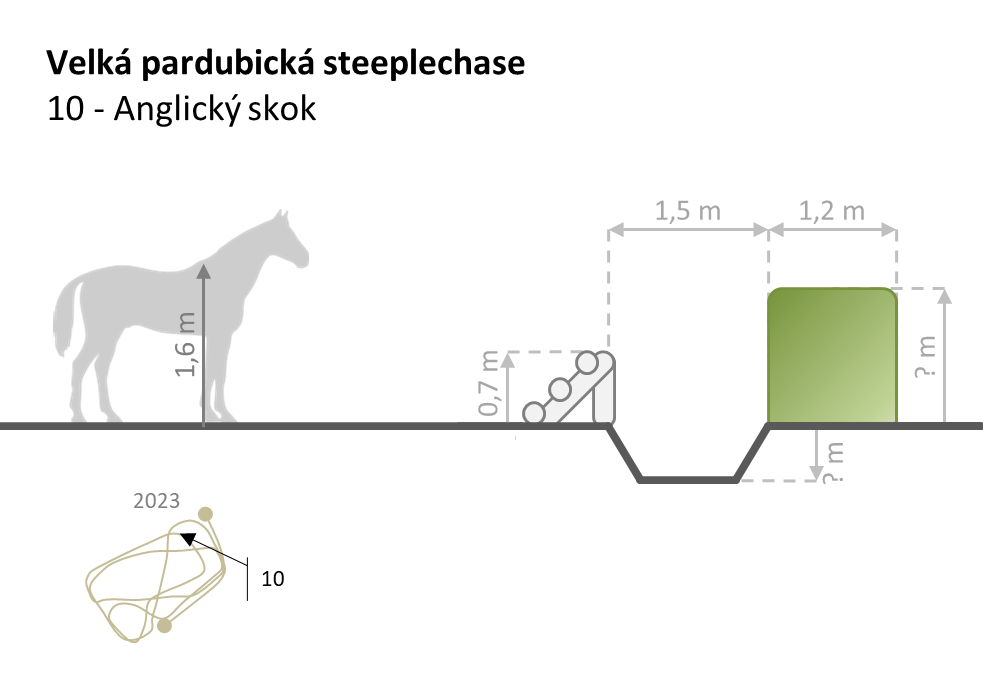
10. English jump

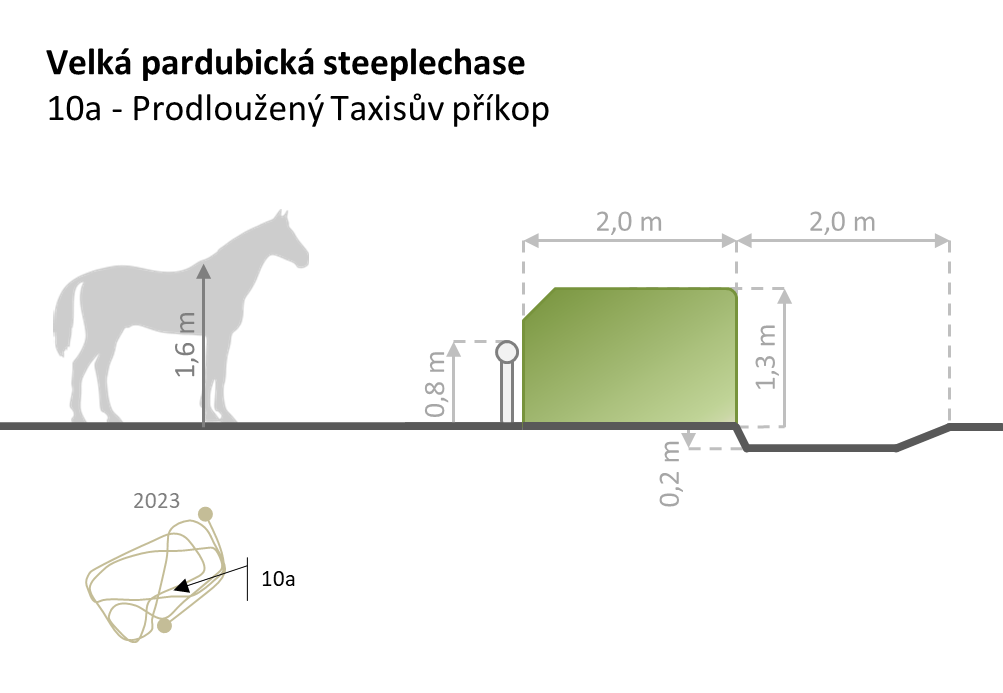
10a. Extended Taxis ditch.

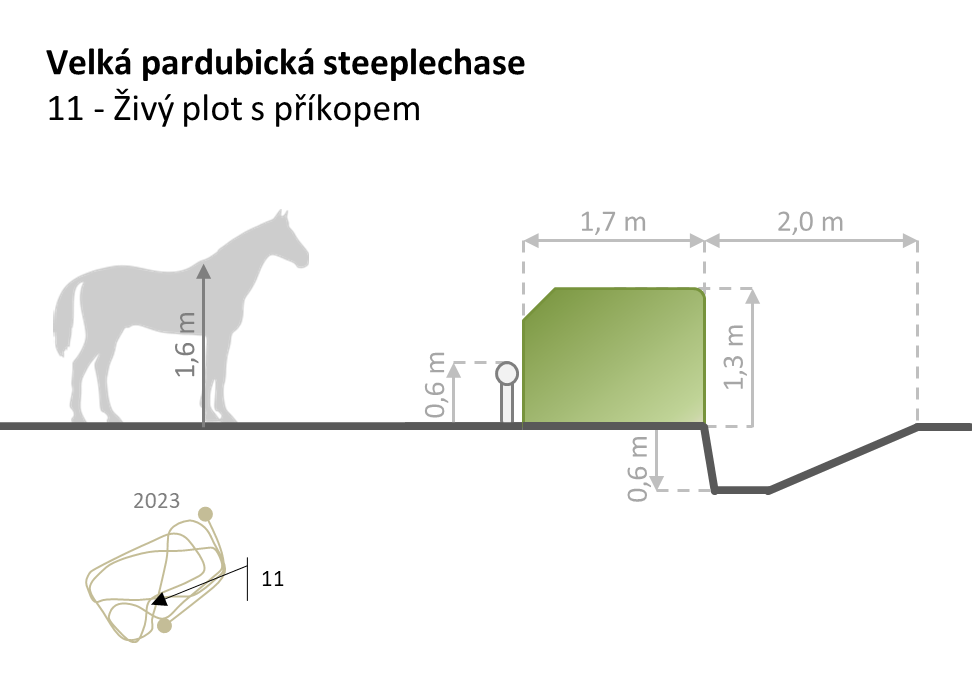
11. Hedge with ditch

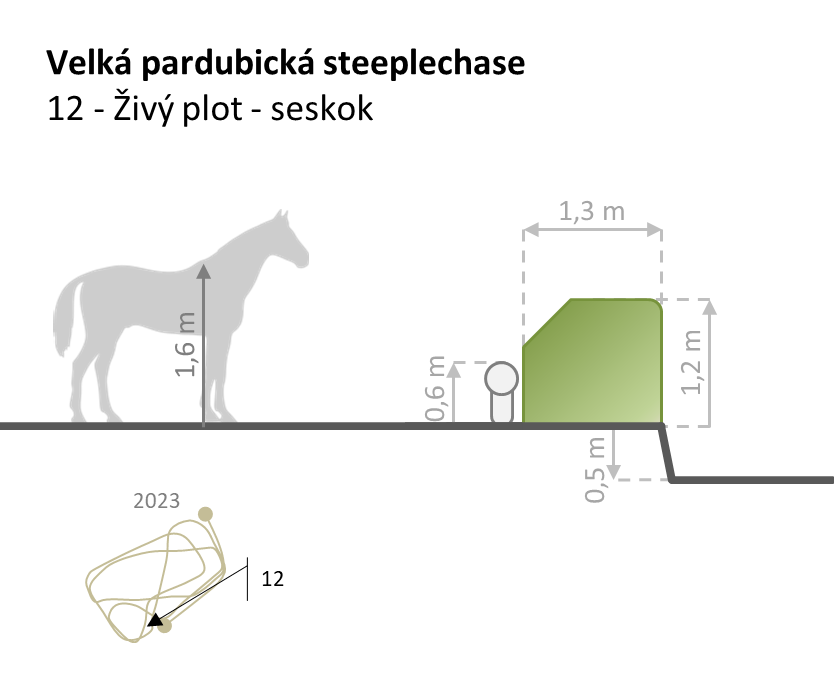
12. Hedge

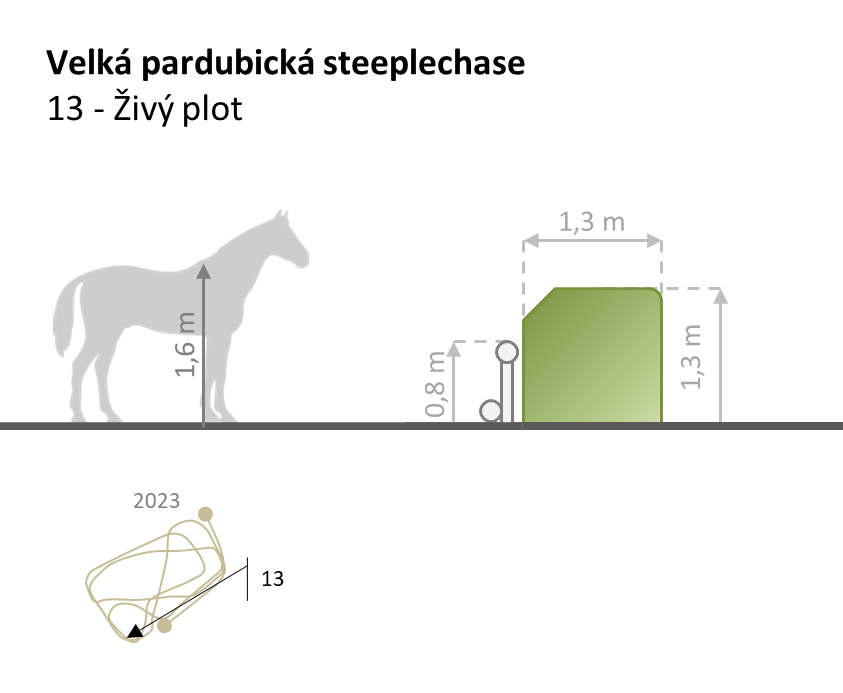
13. Hedge

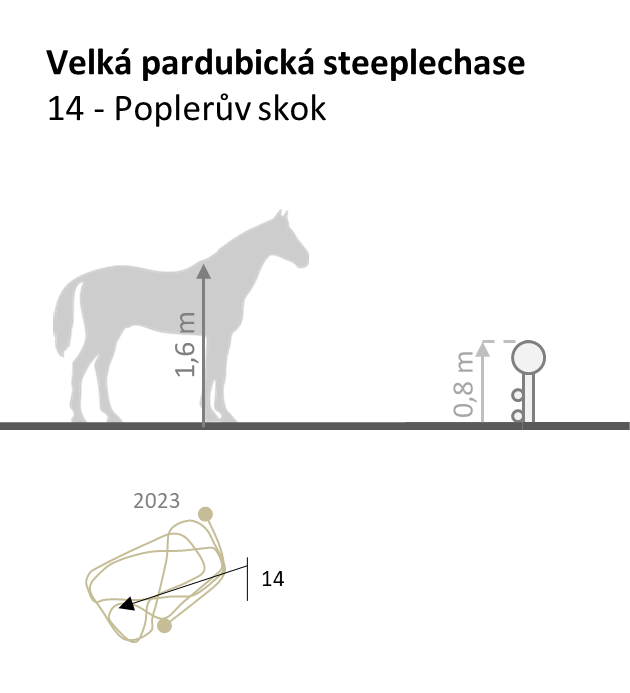
14. Popler's Jump

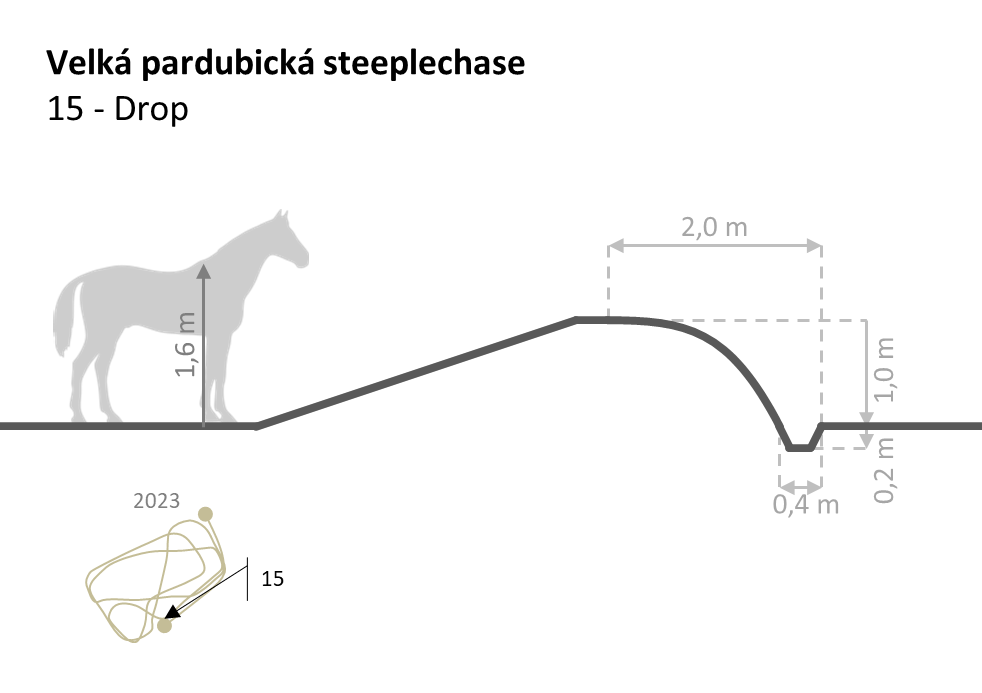
15. Drop Bank

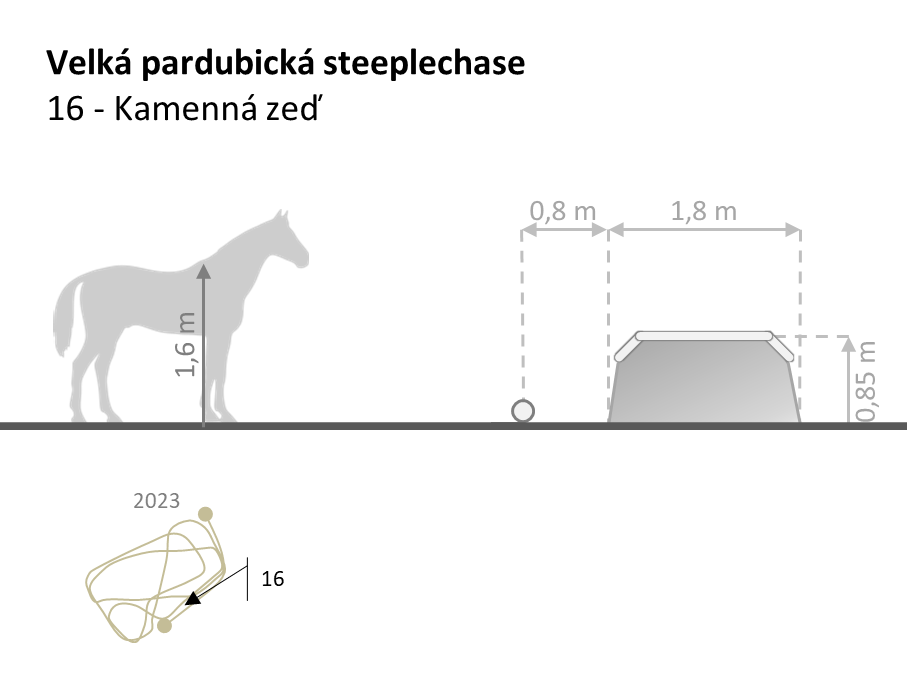
16. Stone Wall

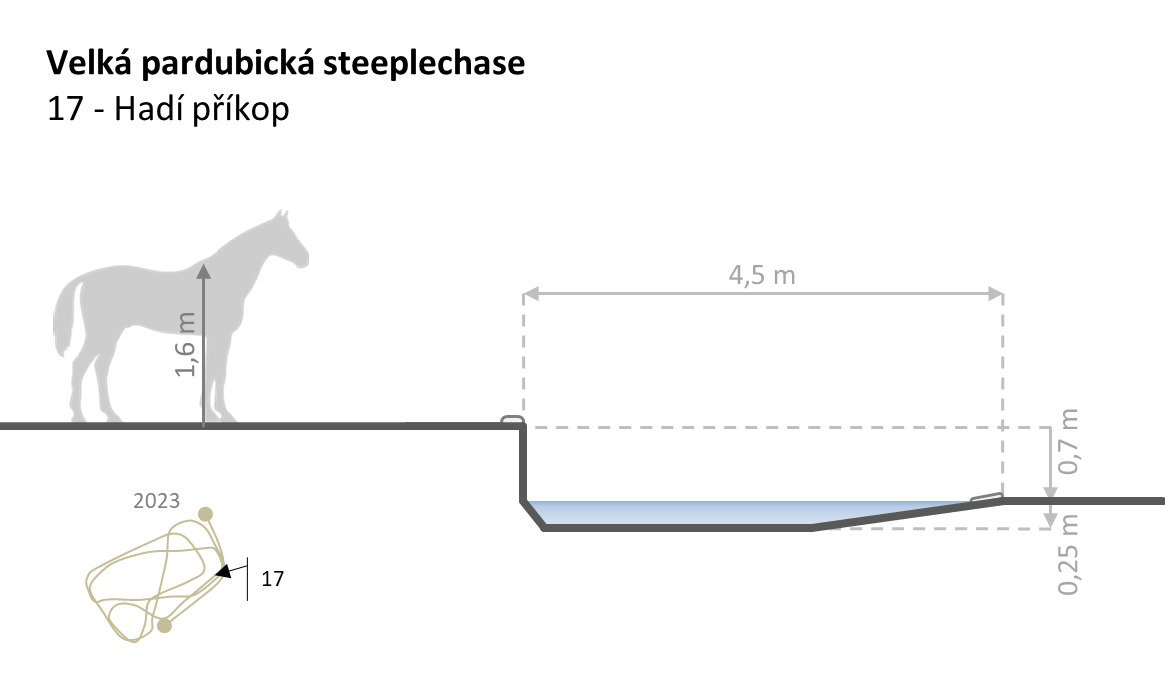
17. Water Trough

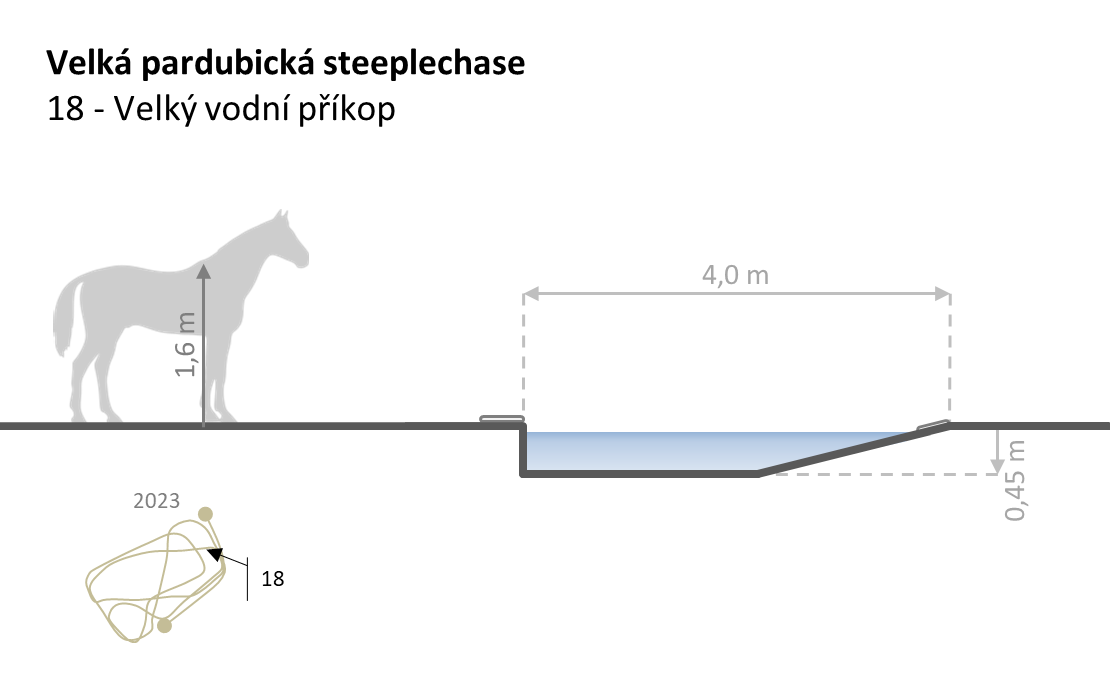
18. Large Moat

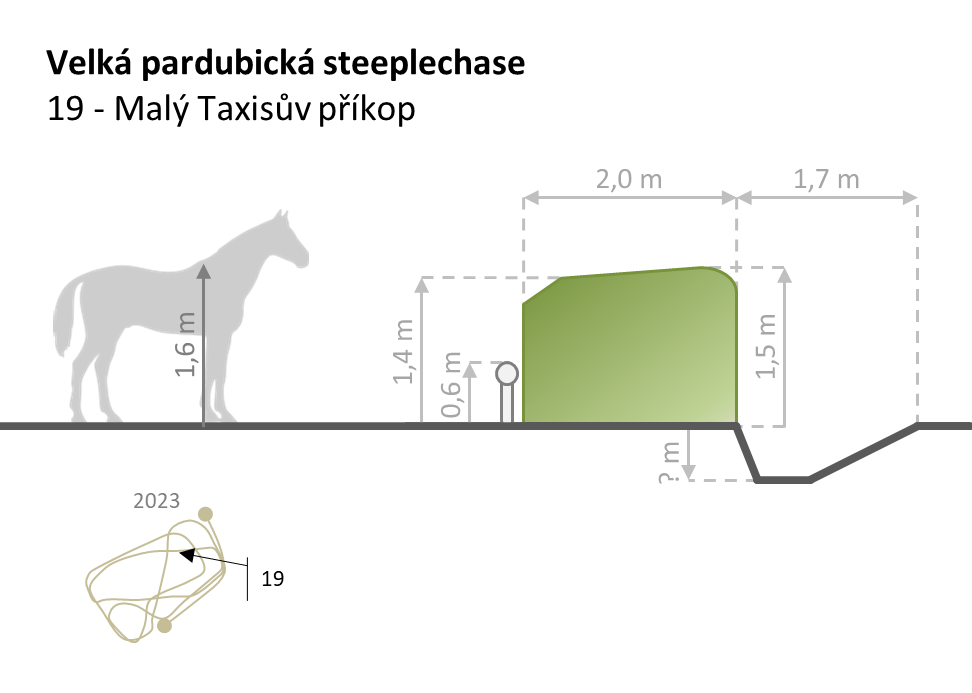
19. Little Taxis drop

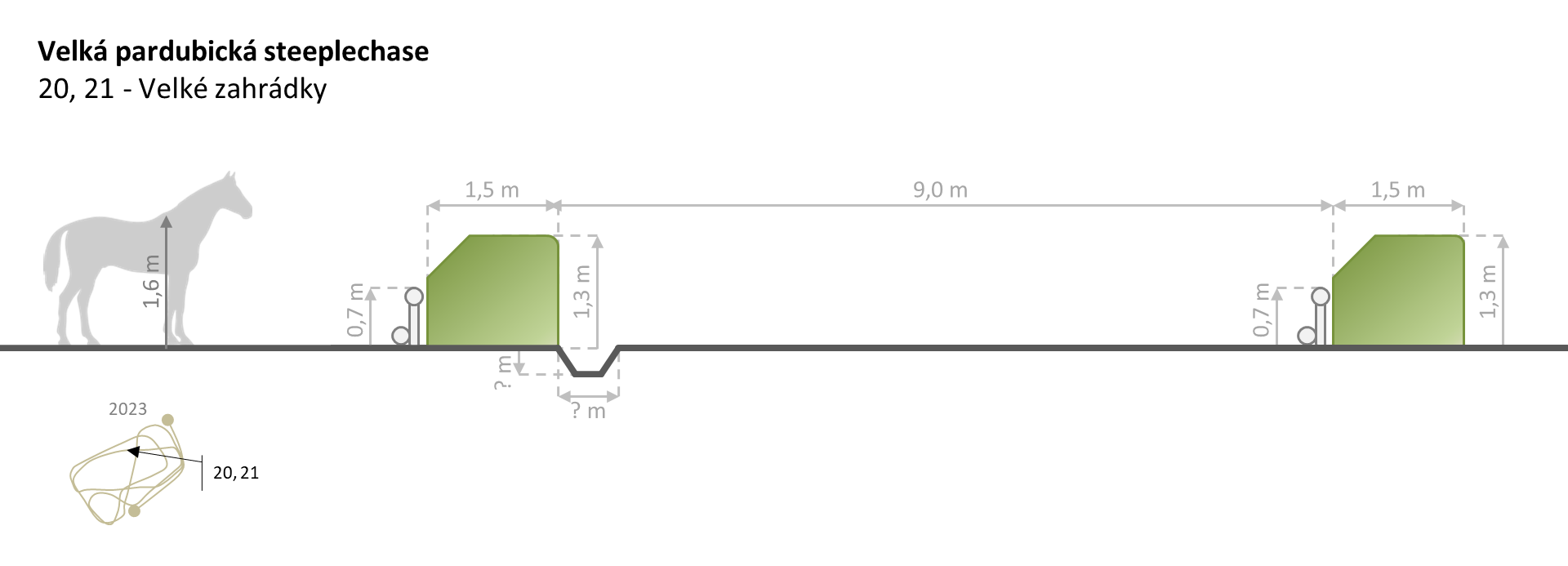
20 & 21. Great gardens

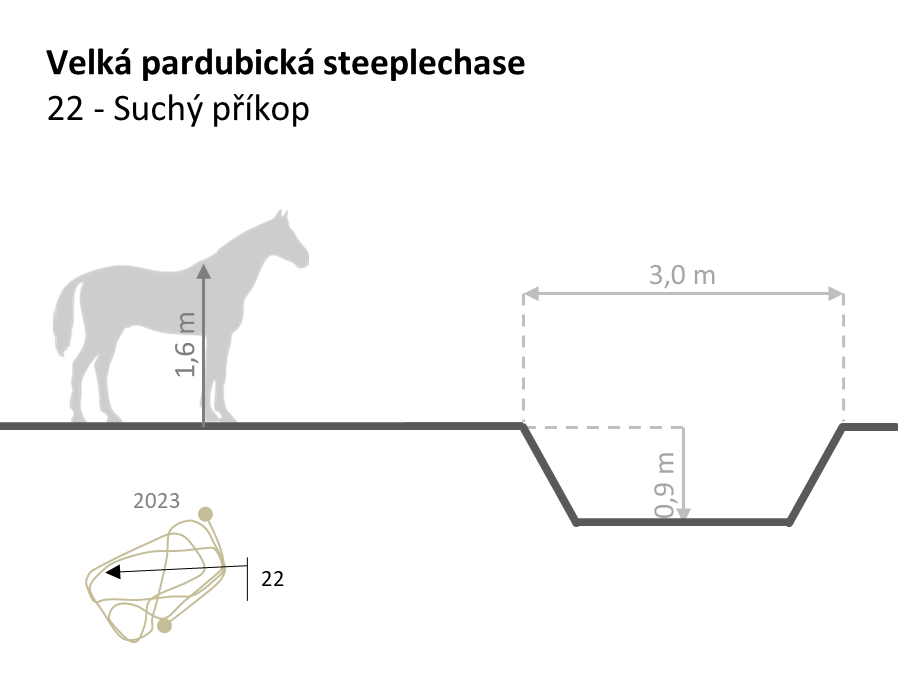
22. Open brook

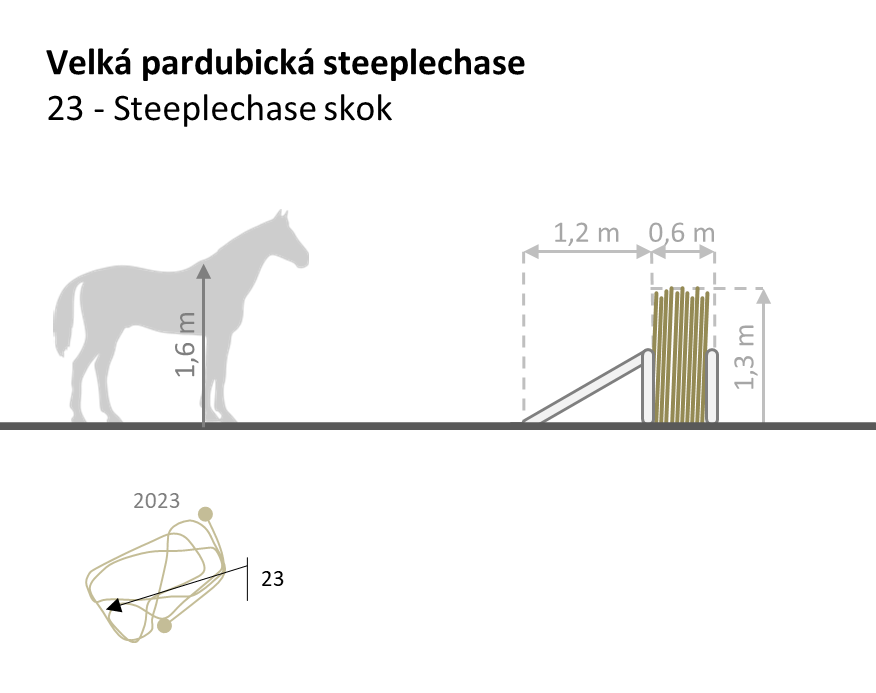
23. Steeplechase obstacle

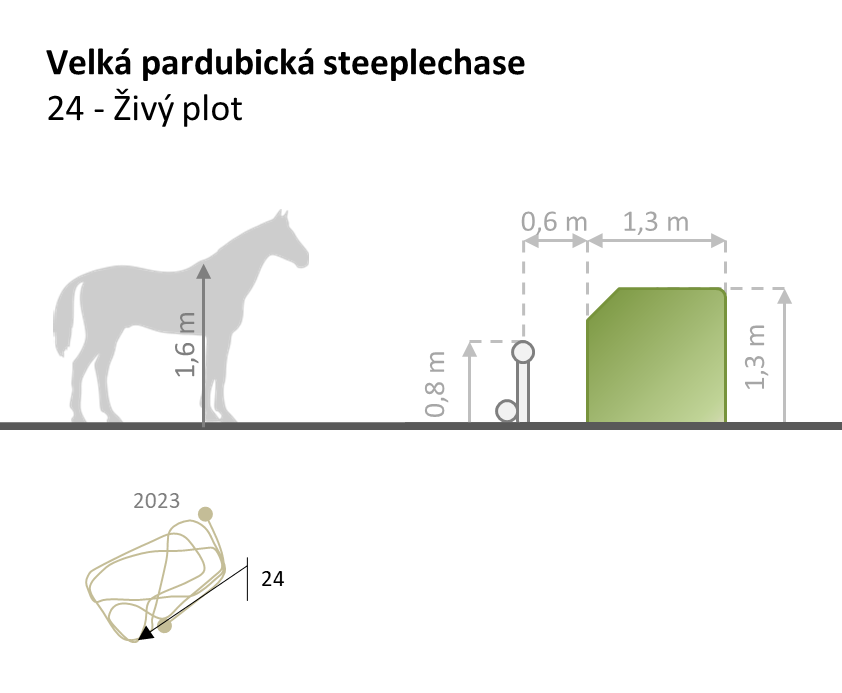
24. "At the hangar" Hedge

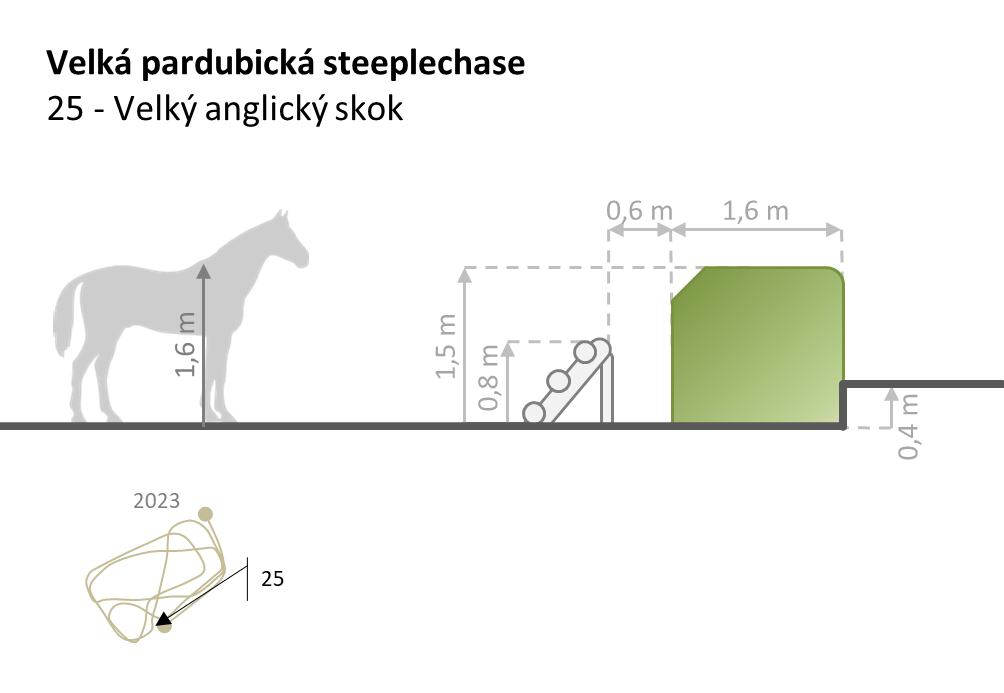
25. Big English jump

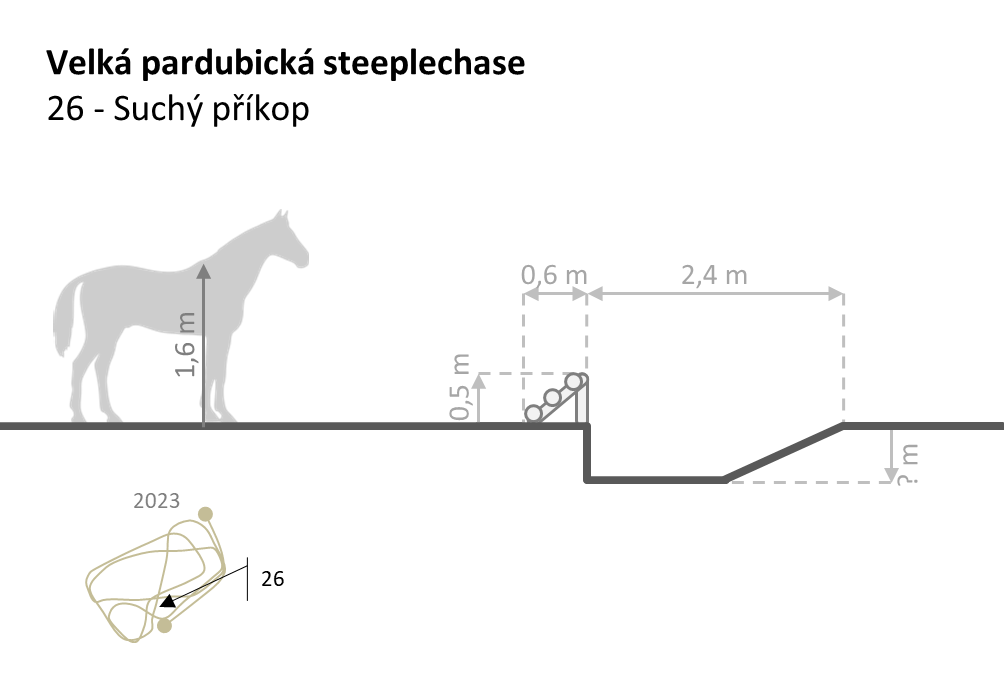
26. American post and rails

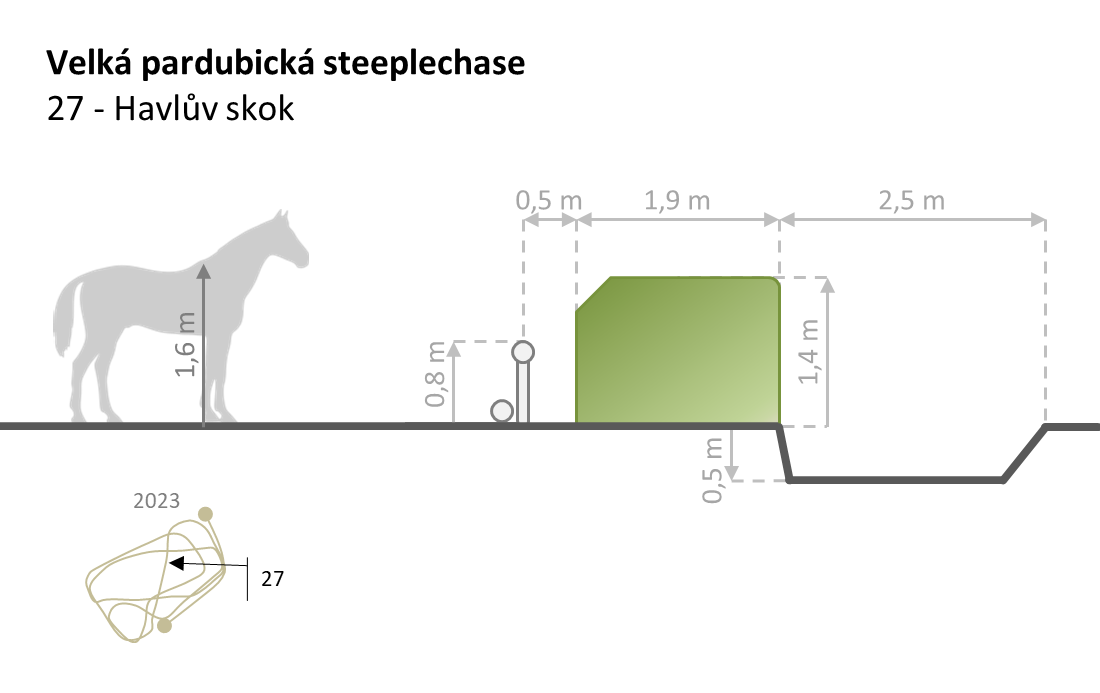
27. Havel's Jump

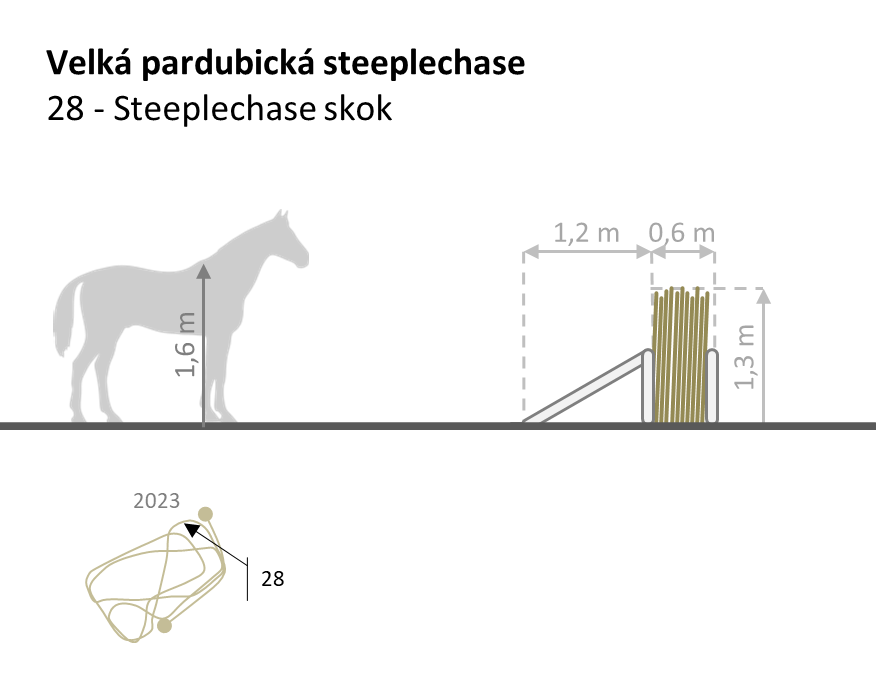
28. Steeplechase obstacle

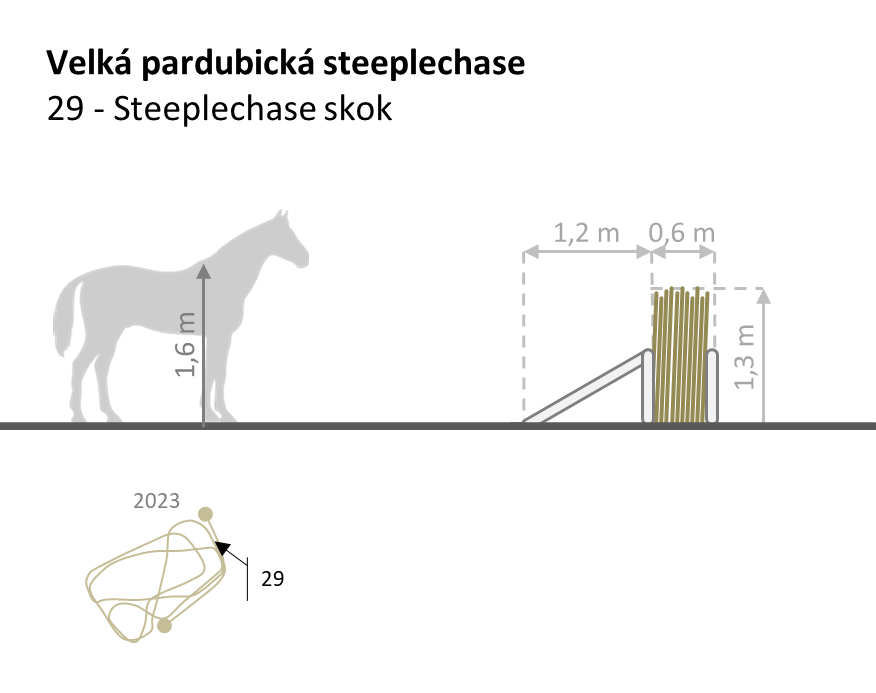
29. Steeplechase obstacle

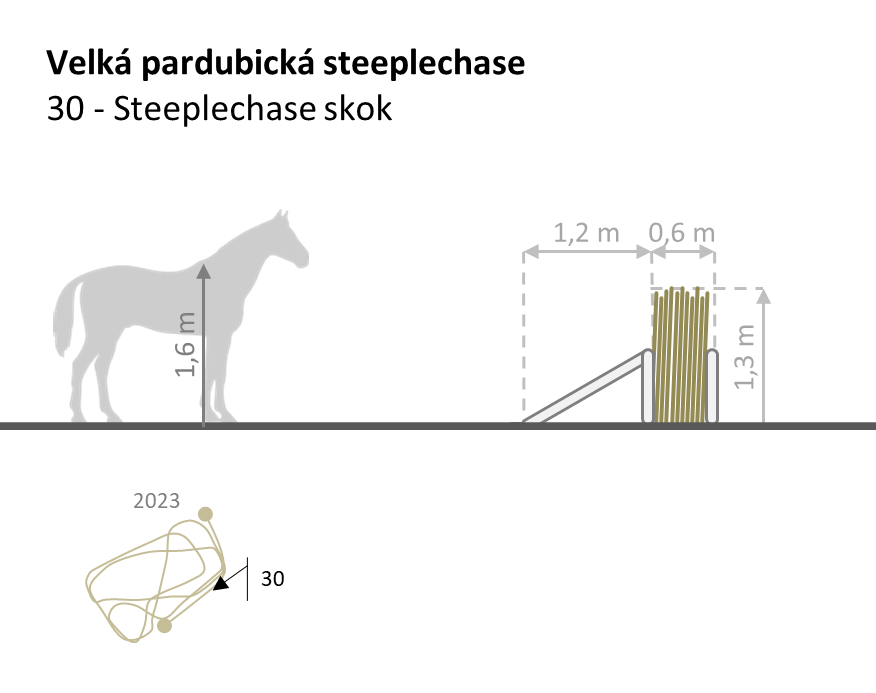
30. Steeplechase obstacle

== Winners ==
| Year | Winning Horse | Age | Handicap (kg) | Jockey | Trainer | Owner | Winning Time |
| 2026 | (Republic of Ireland) Final Orders | 10 | 70 | (Republic of Ireland) Keith Donoghue | (Republic of Ireland) Gavin Cromwell | (Republic of Ireland) CMD Syndicate | 9m 30.68s |
| 2025 | (Republic of Ireland) Stumptown | 8 | 70 | (Republic of Ireland) Keith Donoghue | (Republic of Ireland) Gavin Cromwell | (Republic of Ireland) Furze Bush Syndicate | 9m 06.55s |
| 2024 (Note: Dead heat.) | (Czech Republic) Sexy Lord | 8 | 70 | (Czech Republic) Jaroslav Myška | (Czech Republic) Martina Růžičková | (Czech Republic) HC Amphora-Hora | 9m 40.00s |
| 2024 | (France) Godfrey | 8 | 70 | (Czech Republic) Jan Faltejsek | (Czech Republic) Dalibor Török | (Czech Republic) DS Pegas | 9m 40.00s |
| 2023 | (Czech Republic) Sacamiro | 10 | 70 | (Czech Republic) Jan Faltejsek | (Czech Republic) Eva Petříková | Jezdecký oddíl Beňov | 9m 28.27s |
| 2022 | (Germany) Mr Spex | 8 | 70 | (Slovakia) Lukáš Matuský | (Czech Republic) Luboš Urbánek | Lokotrans | 9m 31.24s |
| 2021 | (Czech Republic) Talent | 10 | 70 | (Czech Republic) Pavel Složil ml. | (Czech Republic) Hana Kabelková | DS Kabelkovi | 9m 12.79s |
| 2020 | (Czech Republic) Hegnus | 12 | 70 | (Slovakia) Lukáš Matuský | (Czech Republic) Radek Holčák | Ševců | 9m 22.99s |
| 2019 | (France) Theophilos | 9 | 70 | (Czech Republic) Josef Bartoš | (Czech Republic) Josef Váňa sr. | Dostihový klub iSport-Váňa | 9m 28.76s |
| 2018 | (France) Tzigane du Berlais | 7 | 70 | (Czech Republic) Jan Faltejsek | (Czech Republic) Pavel Tůma | Dr. Charvát | 9m 05.56s |
| 2017 | (United Kingdom) No Time To Lose | 8 | 70 | (Czech Republic) Jan Kratochvíl | (Czech Republic) Josef Váňa sr. | DS Paragan | 9m 39.98s |
| 2016 | (Czech Republic) Charme Look | 9 | 70 | (Czech Republic) Jan Faltejsek | (Czech Republic) Martina Růžičková | Orling | 9m 42.86s |
| 2015 | (France) Ribelino (Note: In 2015, Nikas finished first but was disqualified for doping.) | 7 | 68 | (Czech Republic) Pavel Kašný | (Czech Republic) Stanislav Kovář | Lokotrans | 8m 56.01s^{R} |
| 2014 | (France) Orphee des Blins | 12 | 66 | (Czech Republic) Jan Faltejsek | (Poland) Grzegorz Witold Wroblewski | DS Pegas | 9m 08.25s |
| 2013 | (France) Orphee des Blins | 11 | 66 | (Czech Republic) Jan Faltejsek | (Poland) Grzegorz Witold Wroblewski | DS Pegas | 9m 33.22s |
| 2012 | (France) Orphee des Blins | 10 | 66 | (Czech Republic) Jan Faltejsek | (Poland) Grzegorz Witold Wroblewski | DS Pegas | 9m 13.39s |
| 2011 | (Poland) Tiumen | 10 | 68.5 | (Czech Republic) Josef Váňa sr. | (Czech Republic) Josef Váňa sr. | Köi Dent | 9m 15.29s |
| 2010 | (Poland) Tiumen | 9 | 68 | (Czech Republic) Josef Váňa sr. | (Czech Republic) Josef Váňa sr. | Köi Dent | 9m 03.73s |
| 2009 | (Poland) Tiumen | 8 | 68 | (Czech Republic) Josef Váňa sr. | (Czech Republic) Josef Váňa sr. | Köi Dent | 9m 19.56s |
| 2008 | (France) Sixteen (Note: In 2008, Amant Gris finished first but was disqualified for taking the wrong course.) | 8 | 66 | (Czech Republic) Josef Bartoš | (Czech Republic) Josef Váňa sr. | Jaroslav Bouček Buc-Film | 8m 58.99s^{R} |
| 2007 | (France) Sixteen | 7 | 66 | (Czech Republic) Dušan Andrés | (Czech Republic) Josef Váňa sr. | Jaroslav Bouček Buc-Film | 9m 18.66s |
| 2006 | (Germany) Decent Fellow | 11 | 67 | (Czech Republic) Josef Bartoš | (Czech Republic) Josef Váňa sr. | Dr. Charvát | 9m 20.60s |
| 2005 | (United States) Maskul | 11 | 67 | (Germany) Dirk Fuhrmann | (Czech Republic) František Holčák | Nýznerov | 9m 11.25s^{R} |
| 2004 | (Germany) Registana | 8 | 65 | (Germany) Peter Gehm | (Czech Republic) Čestmír Olehla | Wrbna Racing | 9m 15.48s^{R} |
| 2003 | (Germany) Registana | 7 | 65 | (Germany) Peter Gehm | (Czech Republic) Čestmír Olehla | Wrbna Racing | 9m 30.14s |
| 2002 | (United States) Maskul | 8 | 67 | (Germany) Peter Gehm | (Czech Republic) Radek Holčák | Nýznerov | 10m 22.07s |
| 2001 | (Czech Republic) Chalco | 9 | 67 | (Germany) Peter Gehm | (Czech Republic) Josef Váňa sr. | Viktor Komárek | 10m 04.52s |
| 2000 | (Czech Republic) Peruán | 12 | 67 | (Czech Republic) Zdeněk Matysík | (Czech Republic) Lenka Horáková | DC Zámrsk - MUDr. Bruna | 9m 29.00s |
| 1999 | (Czech Republic) Peruán | 11 | 67 | (Czech Republic) Zdeněk Matysík | (Czech Republic) Lenka Horáková | DC Zámrsk - MUDr. Bruna | 9m 16.00s^{R} |
| 1998 | (Czech Republic) Peruán | 10 | 67 | (Czech Republic) Zdeněk Matysík | (Czech Republic) Lenka Horáková | DC Zámrsk - MUDr. Bruna | 10m 10.01s |
| 1997 | (Czech Republic) Vronsky | 9 | 67 | (Czech Republic) Josef Váňa sr. | (Czech Republic) Josef Váňa sr. | Viktor Komárek | 10m 33.30s |
| 1996 | (Czech Republic) Cipísek | 8 | 64.5 | (Russia) Vladislav Snitkovskij | (Czech Republic) Josef Váňa sr. | Stáj Luka | 9m 35.10s^{R} |
| 1995 | (Republic of Ireland) It's a Snip | 10 | 67 | (United Kingdom) Charlie Mann | (United Kingdom) Charlie Mann | The Icy Fire Partnership | 10m 03.43s |
| 1994 | (Russia) Erudit | 8 | 65.5 | (Russia) Vladislav Snitkovskij | (Czechoslovakia) František Holčák | Pěník Vlachovice | 10m 06.07s |
| 1993 | (Russia) Rigoletto | 9 | 70.5 | (Czech Republic) Libor Štencl | (Czech Republic) František Holčák | Valstav-Paschal | 10m 29.0s |
| 1992 | (Czechoslovakia) Quirinus | 10 | 70.5 | (Czechoslovakia) Jaroslav Brečka | (Czechoslovakia) Pavel Kalaš | Pôdohospodárske družstvo Senica | 10m 09.1s |
| 1991 | (Czechoslovakia) Železník | 13 | 70.5 | (Czechoslovakia) Josef Váňa sr. | (Czechoslovakia) Čestmír Olehla | Státní statek Bruntál - Světlá Hora | 10m 01.0s |
| 1990 | (Czechoslovakia) Libentína | 7 | 70.5 | (Czechoslovakia) Karel Zajko | (Czechoslovakia) František Holčák | ŠPP Motěšice | 9m 49.4s^{R} |
| 1989 | (Czechoslovakia) Železník | 11 | 70.5 | (Czechoslovakia) Josef Váňa sr. | (Czechoslovakia) Čestmír Olehla | Státní statek Bruntál - Světlá Hora | 10m 16.3s |
| 1988 | (Czechoslovakia) Železník | 10 | 70.5 | (Czechoslovakia) Josef Váňa sr. | (Czechoslovakia) Čestmír Olehla | Státní statek Bruntál - Světlá Hora | 10m 59.8s |
| 1987 | (Czechoslovakia) Železník | 9 | 70.5 | (Czechoslovakia) Josef Váňa sr. | (Czechoslovakia) Čestmír Olehla | Státní statek Bruntál - Světlá Hora | 9m 56.13s^{R} |
| 1986 | (Czechoslovakia) Valencio | 9 | | (Czechoslovakia) Karel Zajko | (Czechoslovakia) František Holčák | JZD Velké Karlovice | 10m 39.4s |
| 1985 | (Czechoslovakia) Festival | 11 | | (Czechoslovakia) Petr Vozáb | (Czechoslovakia) Václav Čermák | PP Kladruby | 10m 36.4s |
| 1984 | (Soviet Union) Erot | 9 | | (Soviet Union) N. Chludějev | (Soviet Union) G. Chajanin | Hřebčín Voschod | 10m 48.9s |
| 1983 | (Soviet Union) Sagar | 8 | | (Czechoslovakia) Pavel Liebich | (Czechoslovakia) Václav Čermák | PP Kladruby | 10m 28.0s |
| 1982 | (Soviet Union) Sagar | 7 | | (Czechoslovakia) Pavel Liebich | (Czechoslovakia) Václav Čermák | PP Kladruby | 10m 12.04s |
| 1981 | (Soviet Union) Sagar | 6 | | (Czechoslovakia) Pavel Liebich | (Czechoslovakia) Václav Čermák | PP Kladruby | 12m 46.37s |
| 1980 | (Czechoslovakia) Simon | 9 | | (Czechoslovakia) Vlastimil Knápek | (Czechoslovakia) Květoslav Mocek | JZD Pokrok Otice | 11m 47.53s |
| 1979 | (Czechoslovakia) Legenda | 6 | | (Czechoslovakia) Jiří Chaloupka | (Czechoslovakia) Jiří Chaloupka | JZD Družba Čebín | 11m 07.10s |
| 1978 | (Czechoslovakia) Lancaster | 6 | | (Czechoslovakia) Jiří Kasal | (Czechoslovakia) Harry Petrlík sr. | PP Šamorín | 11m 30.60s |
| 1977 | (Czechoslovakia) Václav | 9 | | (Czechoslovakia) Václav Chaloupka | (Czechoslovakia) Václav Chaloupka | Státní statek Židlochovice | 12m 15.20s |
| 1976 | (Czechoslovakia) Limit | 8 | | (Czechoslovakia) František Zobal | (Czechoslovakia) František Janík | PP Albertovec | 10m 59.40s |
| 1975 | (Czechoslovakia) Mor | 11 | | (Czechoslovakia) Karel Benš | (Czechoslovakia) František Janík | PP Albertovec | 11m 01.70s |
| 1974 | (Czechoslovakia) Mor | 10 | | (Czechoslovakia) Karel Benš | (Czechoslovakia) František Janík | PP Albertovec | 10m 42.70s |
| 1973 | (Republic of Ireland) Stephen's Society | 7 | | (United Kingdom) Christopher Collins | (United Kingdom) Arthur Stephenson | Christopher Collins | 10m 04.90s^{R} |
| 1972 | (Czechoslovakia) Korok | 13 | | (Czechoslovakia) Václav Chaloupka | (Czechoslovakia) Václav Chaloupka | Státní statek Židlochovice | 10m 55.20s |
| 1971 | (Czechoslovakia) Korok | 12 | | (Czechoslovakia) Václav Chaloupka | (Czechoslovakia) Václav Chaloupka | Státní statek Židlochovice | 11m 02.80s |
| 1970 | (Bulgaria) Vezna II | 6 | | (Bulgaria) Nedělko G. Milev | (Bulgaria) Petko Vladimirov | DZS Štefan Karadža | 11m 41.20s |
| 1969 | (Czechoslovakia) Korok | 10 | | (Czechoslovakia) Václav Chaloupka | (Czechoslovakia) Václav Chaloupka | Státní statek Židlochovice | 11m 01.20s |
| 1968 | cancelled (Note: The 1968 race was cancelled due to the Warsaw Pact invasion of Czechoslovakia.) | | | | | | |
| 1967 | (Soviet Union) Dresděn | 8 | | (Soviet Union) A.N. Sokolov | | JO Avangard Lvov | 11m 34.70s |
| 1966 | (Czechoslovakia) Nestor | 7 | | (Czech Republic) Tibor Kňazík | (Czech Republic) Tibor Kňazík | ŠPU Prešov | 12m 22.60s |
| 1965 | (Czechoslovakia) Mocná | 7 | | (Czech Republic) František Vítek | (Czech Republic) Stanislav Bárta | Státní statek Benešov | 10m 39.60s |
| 1964 | (Soviet Union) Priboj | 7 | | (Soviet Union) Valentin Z. Gorelkin | (Soviet Union) Ivan Avdějev | DSO Urožaj | 11m 33.60s |
| 1963 | (Czech Republic) Koran | 12 | | (Czechoslovakia) František Vítek | (Czech Republic) Václav Čechura | SPÚ Tlumačov | 10m 47.20s |
| 1962 | (Soviet Union) Gaboj | 6 | | (Soviet Union) Rostislav P. Makarov | (Soviet Union) Ivan Avdějev | DSO Urožaj | 10m 05.10s^{R} |
| 1961 | (Soviet Union) Grifel | 8 | | (Soviet Union) Ivan L. Avdějev | (Soviet Union) Ivan Avdějev | Hřebčín č. 158 | 10m 21.30s^{R} |
| 1960 | (Soviet Union) Grifel | 7 | | (Soviet Union) Ivan L. Avdějev | (Soviet Union) Ivan Avdějev | Hřebčín č. 158 | 12m 32.00s |
| 1959 | (Soviet Union) Epigraf | 10 | | (Soviet Union) Vladimir P. Prachov | (Soviet Union) Valerian Kujbyšev | CKSK MO | 12m 05.20s |
| 1958 | (Soviet Union) Epigraf | 9 | | (Soviet Union) Vladimir P. Prachov | (Soviet Union) Valerian Kujbyšev | CKSK MO | 13m 11.00s |
| 1957 | (Soviet Union) Epigraf | 8 | | (Soviet Union) Vladimir N. Fedin | (Soviet Union) Valerian Kujbyšev | CKSK MO | 11m 27.90s |
| 1956 | (Czechoslovakia) Letec | 11 | | (Czech Republic) Josef Vavroušek | (Czech Republic) Josef Dobeš | Státní statek Xaverov | 13m 14.80s |
| 1955 | (Czechoslovakia) Furioso XIV | 7 | | (Czechoslovakia) Josef Čajda | (Czechoslovakia) Emil Šulgan | ŠŽ Topoľčianky | 11m 32.10s |
| 1954 | (Czechoslovakia) Unkas | 14 | | (Czech Republic) Ludvík Raimond | | Jiskra Moravský Beroun | 13m 08.00s |
| 1953 | (Czechoslovakia) Junák | 10 | | (Czechoslovakia) Ferdinand Palyza | (Czechoslovakia) Ferdinand Palyza | DSO Slavoj Opava | 11m 13.50s |
| 1952 | (Czechoslovakia) Vítěz | 13 | | (Czechoslovakia) Miloš Svoboda | | Družstvo Kalich | 11m 25.30s |
| 1951 | (Czechoslovakia) Salvátor | 10 | | (Czechoslovakia) Vladimír Hejmovský (Vladimír Alexandrovič Gejmovskij) | (Czechoslovakia) Vladimír Hejmovský (Vladimír Alexandrovič Gejmovskij) | Sokol KP Opava | 10m 58.00s |
| 1950 | n/d Var | 11 | | (Czechoslovakia) Josef Jungmann | | Sokol Borek | 11m 17.20s |
| 1949 | (Czechoslovakia) Učeň | 11 | | (Czechoslovakia) Oldřich Dostál | | VSJ Pardubice | 10m 55.30s |
| 1948 | n/d Var | 9 | | (Czechoslovakia) Miroslav Kotek | (Czechoslovakia) Jaroslav Houra | Vojenský útvar 2108 | 11m 03.30s |
| 1947 | (France) Rayon De Lune | 12 | | (France) Maurice Buret | | Centre National des Sports Equesters | 10m 30.80s^{R} |
| 1946 | n/d Titan | 9 | | (Czechoslovakia) Miloš Svoboda | (Czechoslovakia) Miloš Svoboda | Vojenský útvar 2228 | 11m 56.40s |
| 1938–1945 | cancelled (Note: The race was not run in 1938–1945 due to Nazi occupation and World War II.) | | | | | | |
| 1937 | (Czechoslovakia) Norma | 10 | | (Czechoslovakia) Lata Brandisová | Karel Šmejda | Zdenko Radslav Kinský | 10m 47.00s |
| 1936 | (Germany) Herold | 11 | | (Germany) Oskar Lengnik | Kerpen | Oskar Lengnik | 10m 47.00s |
| 1935 | (Germany) Herold | 10 | | (Germany) Oskar Lengnik | | Oskar Lengnik | 10m 41.40s |
| 1934 | (Germany) Wahne | 11 | | (Germany) H. Wiese | H. Wiese | H. Wiese | 12m 44.00s |
| 1933 | (Germany) Remus | 8 | | (Kingdom of Italy) Reguiero Spano | | Dr. Alfred Tonelles | 11m 24.60s |
| 1932 | (Germany) Remus | 7 | | (Kingdom of Italy) Reguiero Spano | | Dr. Alfred Tonelles | 12m 48.80s |
| 1931 | (Czechoslovakia) Pohanka | 5 | | (France) Lt. F. Durand | Karel Šmejda | Zdenko Radslav Kinský | 14m 47.80s |
| 1930 | (Hungary) Gyi Lovam! | 8 | | (Czechoslovakia) Rudolf Popler | Rudolf Popler | Cpt. Rudolf Popler | 12m 00.00s |
| 1929 | (Germany) Ben Hur | 7 | | (Germany) Gustav Schwandt | Gustav Schwandt | Gustav Schwandt | 12m 37.00s |
| 1928 | (Germany) Vogler | 8 | | (Germany) Hans Schmidt | (Germany) Feldwebel H. Nünninghoff | Feldwebel H. Nünninghoff | 12m 03.90s |
| 1927 | (Czechoslovakia) Forum | n/a | | (Czechoslovakia) Josef Charous | (Czechoslovakia) Josef Charous | Cpt. J. Charous | 14m 00.00s |
| 1926 | (Hungary) All Right II | 7 | | (Czechoslovakia) Rudolf Popler | Lufta | Stáj Popler-Formánková | 17m 44.60s |
| 1925 | (Germany) Landgraf II | 7 | | (Czechoslovakia) Karek Holoubek | | Stáj Max | 19m 19.20s |
| 1924 | Herero | | | Eduard Stärz | Eduard Stärz | Stáj Sankt Georg | 13m 10.00s |
| 1923 | (Germany) Landgraf II | 5 | 66 | (Czechoslovakia) Jan Pintér | Martinkovich | Stáj Max | 13m 29.00s |
| 1922 | Baldur | 5 | 60 | (Czechoslovakia) František Gimpel | Buřival | Lady Huntingghost | 15m 27.00s |
| 1921 | Periwig | 7 | 68 | (Czechoslovakia) Josef Syrový | (Czechoslovakia) Oldřich Rosák | A. Vaněk | 15m 32.00s |
| 1920 | Jonathan (Note: In 1920, Jonathan was disqualified for not finishing in time limit.) | 11 | 70 | (Czechoslovakia) Karel Kozlík | | Jan Pálffy | 20m 15.00s |
| 1914–1919 | cancelled (Note: The race was not run in 1914–1919 due to World War I.) | | | | | | |
| 1913 (Note: In 1912 and 1913 there was also a steeple-chase race for army.) | Hurain | | | Cpt. Wilhelm Reimer | | Capt. Johann Buzinkay v. Buzinka | |
| 1913 | Dick Turpin | 10 | | Ferencz Janek | Martinkovich | Lt. Friedrich Rosenthal | 11m 11.50s |
| 1912 | Hurain | | | 1Lt. Wilhelm Reimer | | Capt. Johann Buzinkay v. Buzinka | |
| 1912 | Jamagata | 6 | | (Austrian Empire) František Bartosch | (Austrian Empire) František Bartosch | František Bartosch | 11m 39.40s |
| 1911 | (German Empire) Glenmorgan | 6 | 73.5 | (German Empire) Jenö von Egan-Krieger | (German Empire) Jenö von Egan-Krieger | Count Frankenberg | 10m 22.00s |
| 1910 | (German Empire) Paul Heston | 5 | 70 | Max Seiffert | | Maj. Karl Adam von Wuthenau-Hohenthurm | 14m 26.50s |
| 1909 | race void (Note: The 1909 race was declared void as none of the three horses that ran finished.) | | | | | | |
| 1908 | cancelled (Note: The 1908 race was cancelled due to snow.) | | | | | | |
| 1907 | (German Empire) Kourgan | 6 | | (German Empire) Josef Birghan | Rottman | P. Mecklenburg | 11m 24.60s |
| 1906 | (German Empire) Tigra | 4 | | (United Kingdom) Harry H. Huxtable | Wheeler | Anton Dreher | 12m 10.60s |
| 1905 | (German Empire) Scotch Moor | 10 | 71 | Max Seiffert | | Feldwebel Knesebeck | not measured |
| 1904 | Dennis | 6 | | (United Kingdom) Thomas H. Buckenham | (United Kingdom) Walter Earl | Count Karel Kinsky | not measured |
| 1903 | Jour Fix | 7 | 67.5 | (Kingdom of Bohemia) Oldřich Rosák | van Ness | Emil von David jr. | 12m 04.00s |
| 1902 | Jour Fix | 6 | 62.5 | (Kingdom of Bohemia) Oldřich Rosák | Hough | Emil von David jr. | not measured |
| 1901 | Chorazy | 6 | 62 | (United Kingdom) Frederick E. Slinn | | 1st Lt. Eduard Koller | not measured |
| 1900 | (Hungary) Magyarád | 8 | 68.5 | (United Kingdom) Thomas H. Buckenham | (United Kingdom) Ralph Heath | Count Zdenko Kinský | not measured |
| 1899 | Sláva | 5 | 63.5 | (United Kingdom) Thomas H. Buckenham | (United Kingdom) Ralph Heath | Count Zdenko Kinský | not measured |
| 1898 | (German Empire) Handy Andy | n/a | 80 | (United Kingdom) Robert Jekyll | H.Brown Jr. | Gustav Beit | not measured |
| 1897 | (Hungary) Magyarád | 5 | 71 | (Ireland) Edward Geoghegan | (United Kingdom) Ralph Heath | Count Zdenko Kinský | not measured |
| 1896 | (United Kingdom) Lady Anne | 10 | 80 | (Ireland) Edward Geoghegan | (United Kingdom) George Herbert | Jacques Schawell | not measured |
| 1895 | (France) Galamb II | 4 | 74 | (United Kingdom) Arthur Hall | John Pache | Robert Lebaudy | not measured |
| 1894 | (United Kingdom) Lady Anne | 8 | 77.5 | (Ireland) Edward Geoghegan | (United Kingdom) George Herbert | Jacques Schawell | not measured |
| 1893 | Hadnagy | 7 | 69 | (United Kingdom) George Williamson | Hansi Fries | General Count H. Lamberg | not measured |
| 1892 | Alphabet | 7 | 63 | (United Kingdom) John Westlake | (Kingdom of Bohemia) Dobrovský | Count Rudolf Ferdinand Kinský | not measured |
| 1891 | (United Kingdom) Lady Anne | 5 | 64 | (United Kingdom) Richard Harry Fletcher | (United Kingdom) George Herbert | Jacques Schawell | not measured |
| 1890 | Alphabet | 5 | 62.5 | (United Kingdom) George Williamson | (Kingdom of Bohemia) Dobrovský | Count Rudolf Ferdinand Kinský | not measured |
| 1889 | Parisis | 6 | 61.5 | (United Kingdom) Richard Harry Fletcher | | 1st Lt. Alex Kutchenbach | not measured |
| 1888 | (German Empire) Et Caetera | 4 | 66.5 | (United Kingdom) Max Phillips | | (Hungary) Count Nicolo Esterházy | not measured |
| 1887 | Woodman | 9 | 70 | (Austria) Hector Baltazzi | | Hector Baltazzi | not measured |
| 1886 | (German Empire) Hanno | 4 | 62 | (United Kingdom) Richard Harry Fletcher | | Ferdinand von Schosberger | not measured |
| 1885 | Abracadabra | 6 | 73 | Hansi Fries | Hansi Fries | (Hungary) Count Nicolo Esterházy | not measured |
| 1884 | (German Empire) Jessica | 6 | 75 | (Ireland) William H. Moore | | Oscar Oehlschläger | not measured |
| 1883 | Victoria | 10 | 80.5 | (Austria) Hector Baltazzi | (United Kingdom) George Herbert | Jacques Schawell | not measured |
| 1882 | (German Empire) Per Dampf | 5 | 71 | (United Kingdom) Thomas Harraway | | Baron Ernst von Falkenhausen | not measured |
| 1881 | Victoria | 8 | 83.5 | (Austria) Hector Baltazzi | (United Kingdom) George Herbert | Jacques Schawell | not officially 10m 45.20s |
| 1880 | Good Morning | 4 | 66 | (United Kingdom) Max Phillips | (United Kingdom) Ralph Heath | G.F.J. Smith (Zdenko Kinský) | not measured |
| 1879 | (Hungary) Rudi | 5 | 73.5 | I. Hanreich | (United Kingdom) John Beeson | (Hungary) Count Nicolo Esterházy | not measured |
| 1878 | (Hungary) Brigand | 8 | 84 | (Austria) Fritz Reichsgraf Wolff-Metternich zur Grachth | (United Kingdom) John Reeves | (Hungary) Count Tasziló Festetics | not measured |
| 1877 | (Hungary) Brigand | 7 | 80 | (Austria) Fritz Reichsgraf Wolff-Metternich zur Grachth | (United Kingdom) George Long | (Hungary) Count Tasziló Festetics | not measured |
| 1876 | cancelled (Note: The 1876 race was cancelled due to frost.) | | | | | | |
| 1875 | (Hungary) Brigand | 5 | 78.5 | (United Kingdom) George Herbert | (United Kingdom) George Long | (Hungary) Count Tasziló Festetics | not measured |
| 1874 | (France) Fantôme | 6 | 80.5 | (United Kingdom) George Sayers | | (Germany) Baron von Cramm | not measured |

- ^{R} – track record
