= Železník (horse) =

Czechoslovak Thoroughbred racehorse

- Sire: Zigeunersohn
- Grandsire: Grande
- Dam: Želatina
- Damsire: Le Loup Garou
- Sex: Gelding
- Foaled: 29 April 1978
- Country: Czechoslovakia
- Colour: Chestnut
- Owner: Světlá Hora
- Record: 58: 30–9–1

Major wins
- Velká pardubická (1987, 1988, 1989, 1991)

Železník (29 April 1978 – 22 December 2004) was a Czechoslovak racehorse, the four-time winner of the Velká pardubická steeplechase.

== Career ==
Železník was foaled in Šamorín, Slovakia in 1978. His dam was the Soviet mare Želatina and his sire was the G.D.R. stallion Zigeunersohn. In October 1979, Železník was sold as a yearling for 120,000 CZK to the stables of the Agrochemical Company in Slavkov u Brna. His career started out on the flat but almost ended before it took off – during his first racing season, Železník was injured in the paddock, resulting in a damaged rear knee.

In 1982 he was turned over to a young rider named Josef Váňa, and in 1983 Železník started his jumping career, winning some races that very same year. With Antonin Novak in the saddle, Železník started his first Velká pardubická race in 1985.

In 1987 he was one of 98 horses nominated for the Grand National steeplechase along with another Czech-owned horse, Valencio. Both horses arrived in Britain two months before the race and were to be trained in the South of England by Ben Wise at his Jevington stables near Polegate. However, due to blood irregularities, Železník was quarantined by the British authorities and only Valencio ran.

Success for Železník was to come later that year though as Váňa rode him to victory in the 1987 Velká pardubická steeplechase. Železník went on to win the Velká Pardubická a record four times: in 1987, 1988, 1989 and 1991 (and Váňa four more times on other horses, becoming the only eight-time winning jockey of the race). During his career he raced 58 times and he won 30 races.
