= Světlá Hora =

- Municipality
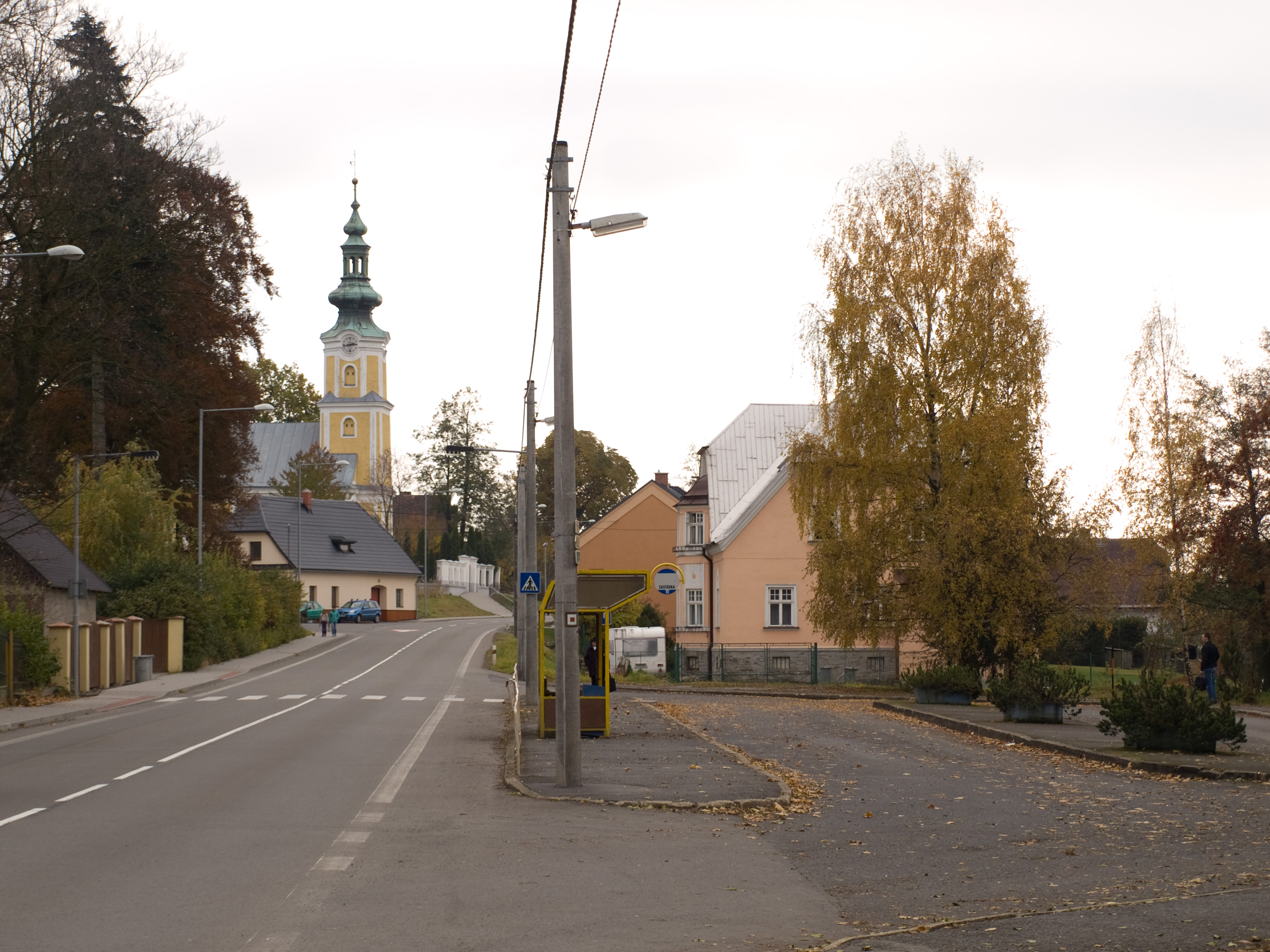
- Centre of Světlá

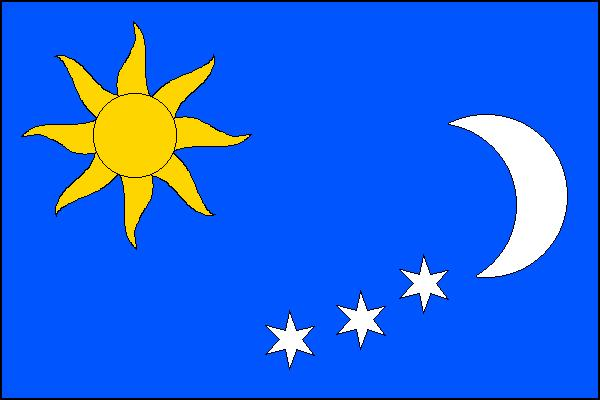
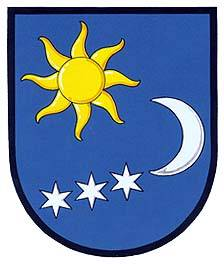
- Flag Coat of arms

- Location in the Czech Republic
- Coordinates: 50°2′43″N 17°24′4″E
- Country: Czech Republic
- Region: Moravian-Silesian
- District: Bruntál
- First mentioned: 1267

Area
  - Total: 43.01 km^{2} (16.61 sq mi)
- Elevation: 575 m (1,886 ft)

Population (2026-01-01)
  - Total: 1,337
  - Density: 31.09/km^{2} (80.51/sq mi)
- Time zone: UTC+1 (CET)
  - Summer (DST): UTC+2 (CEST)
- Postal code: 793 31
- Website: www.svetlahora.cz

Světlá Hora is a municipality in Bruntál District in the Moravian-Silesian Region of the Czech Republic. It has about 1,300 inhabitants.

== Administrative division ==
Světlá Hora consists of five municipal parts (in brackets population according to the 2021 census):

- Dětřichovice (102)
- Podlesí (92)
- Stará Voda (62)
- Suchá Rudná (60)
- Světlá (1,024)

== Geography ==
Světlá Hora is located about 7 kilometres (4 mi) northwest of Bruntál and 50 km (31 mi) north of Olomouc. It lies on the border between the Nízký Jeseník and Hrubý Jeseník ranges. The highest point is the mountain Ovčí vrch at 966 m (3,169 ft) above sea level.

== History ==
The first written mention of the village of Světlá is from 1267.

During some of the time of the Nazi German control of the region, a subcamp of Auschwitz III was located here: the town of Světlá was the location of the Lichtewerden labor camp, established on 11 November 1944.

== Demographics ==
Historical population

Year	Pop.	±%
1869	3,124	—
1880	3,198	+2.4%
1890	3,169	−0.9%
1900	2,854	−9.9%
1910	2,773	−2.8%

Year	Pop.	±%
1921	2,458	−11.4%
1930	2,375	−3.4%
1950	1,205	−49.3%
1961	1,174	−2.6%
1970	1,363	+16.1%

Year	Pop.	±%
1980	1,345	−1.3%
1991	1,477	+9.8%
2001	1,532	+3.7%
2011	1,389	−9.3%
2021	1,340	−3.5%

Source: Censuses

== Transport ==
Světlá Hora is located on the railway line Bruntál–Malá Morávka. It is only in operation during the summer tourist season on weekends.

== Sport ==
Světlá Hora is known for a horse racing centre with a race track. Železník, the most successful Czech racehorse, lived here from 1982 until his death in 2004.

== Sights ==
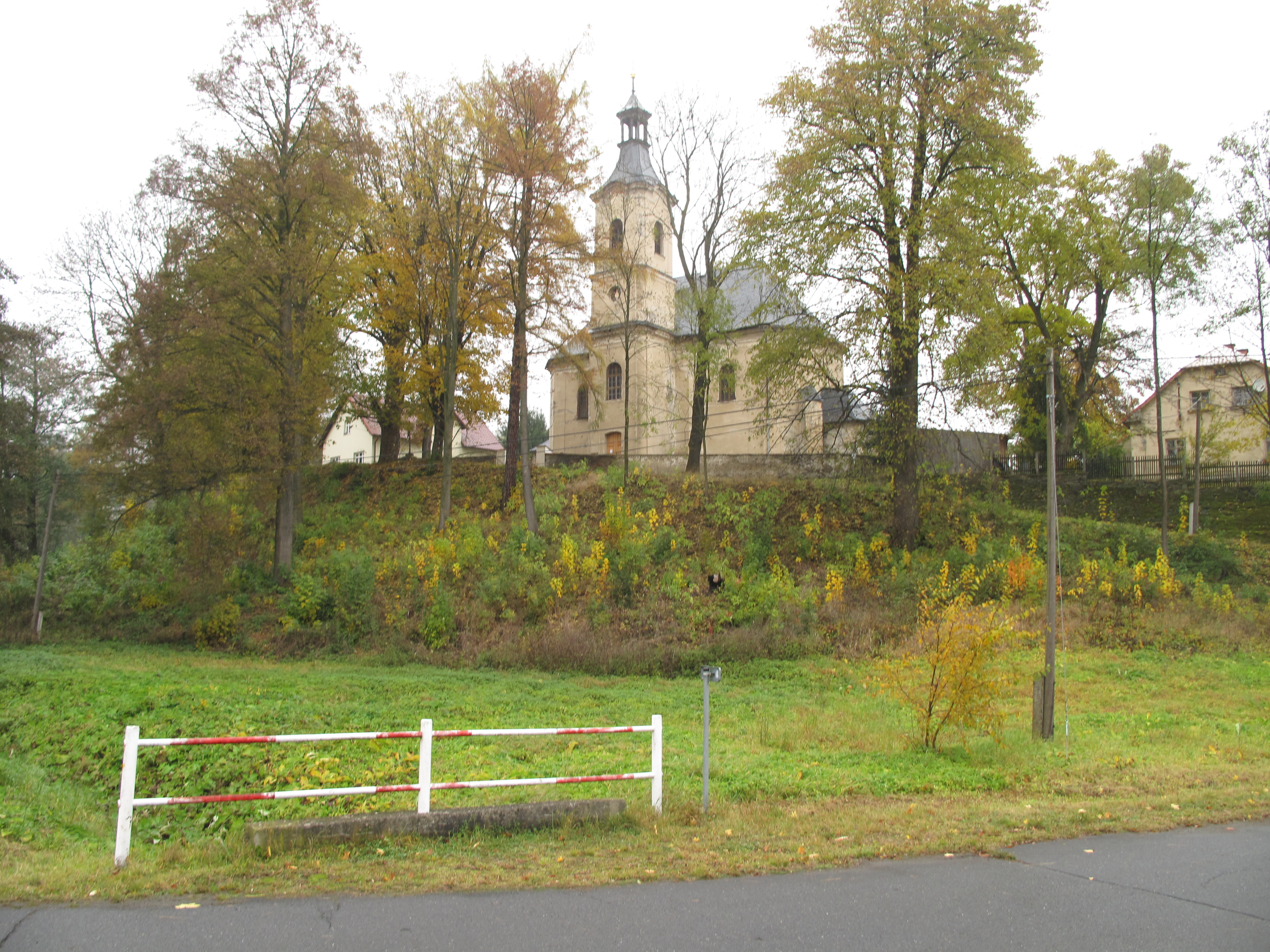
Church of Saint Michael the Archangel

The Church of Saints Barbara and Catherine is located in Světlá. It is a late Baroque church from 1789.

The Church of Saint Michael the Archangel in Dětřichovice was built in the late Baroque style in 1771–1773.

== Twin towns – sister cities ==
Světlá Hora is twinned with:

- Polska Cerekiew, Poland
- Rieste, Germany
