= Rudolf Popler =

Czech equestrian

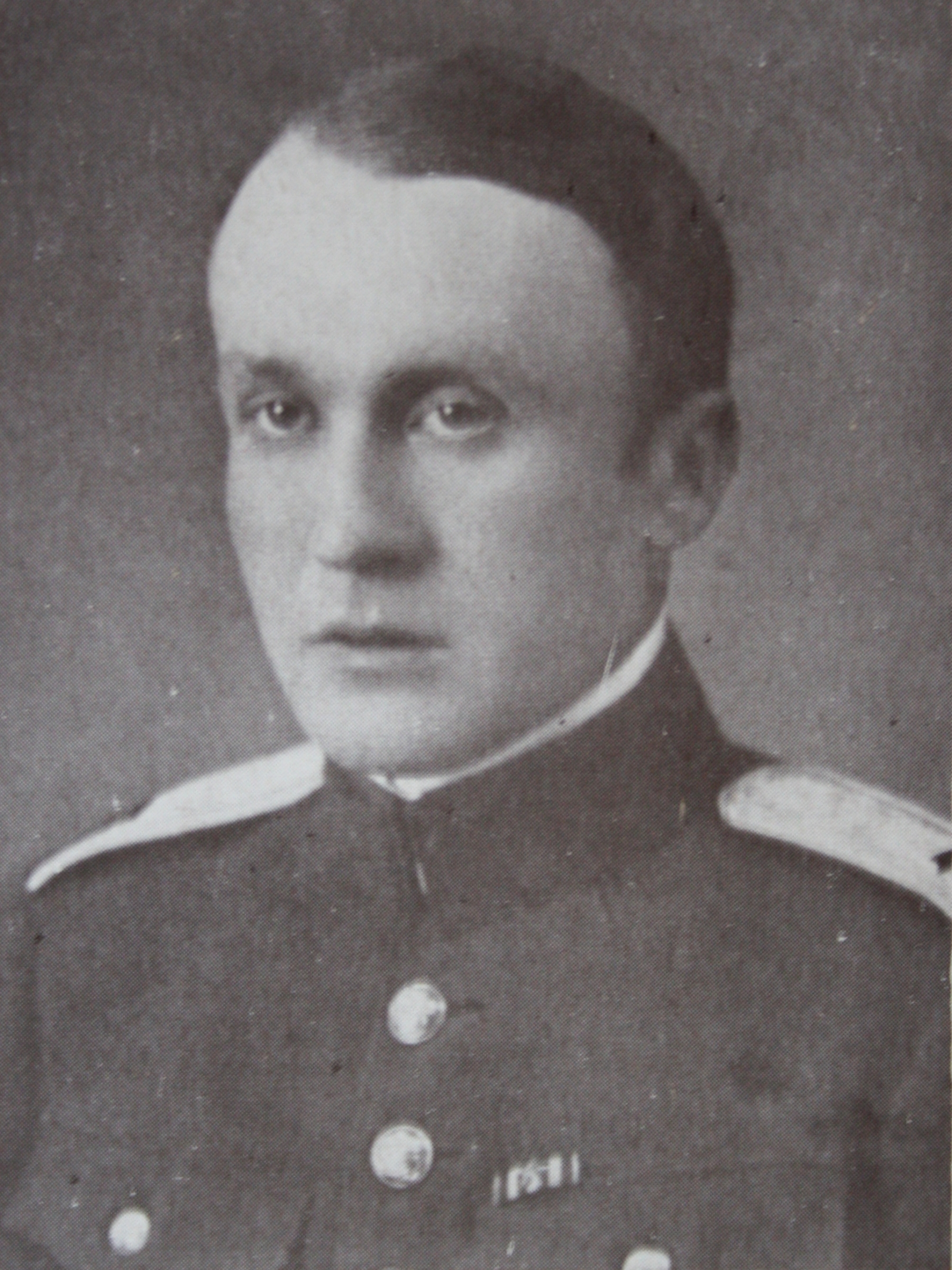

Personal information
- Nationality: Czech
- Born: 26 May 1899; Vysoké Mýto, Austria-Hungary
- Died: 16 October 1932 (aged 33); Pardubice, Czechoslovakia

Sport
- Sport: Equestrian

Rudolf Popler (26 May 1899 – 16 October 1932) was a Czech equestrian. He competed at the 1924 Summer Olympics and the 1928 Summer Olympics.
