= Tlumačov =

- Municipality
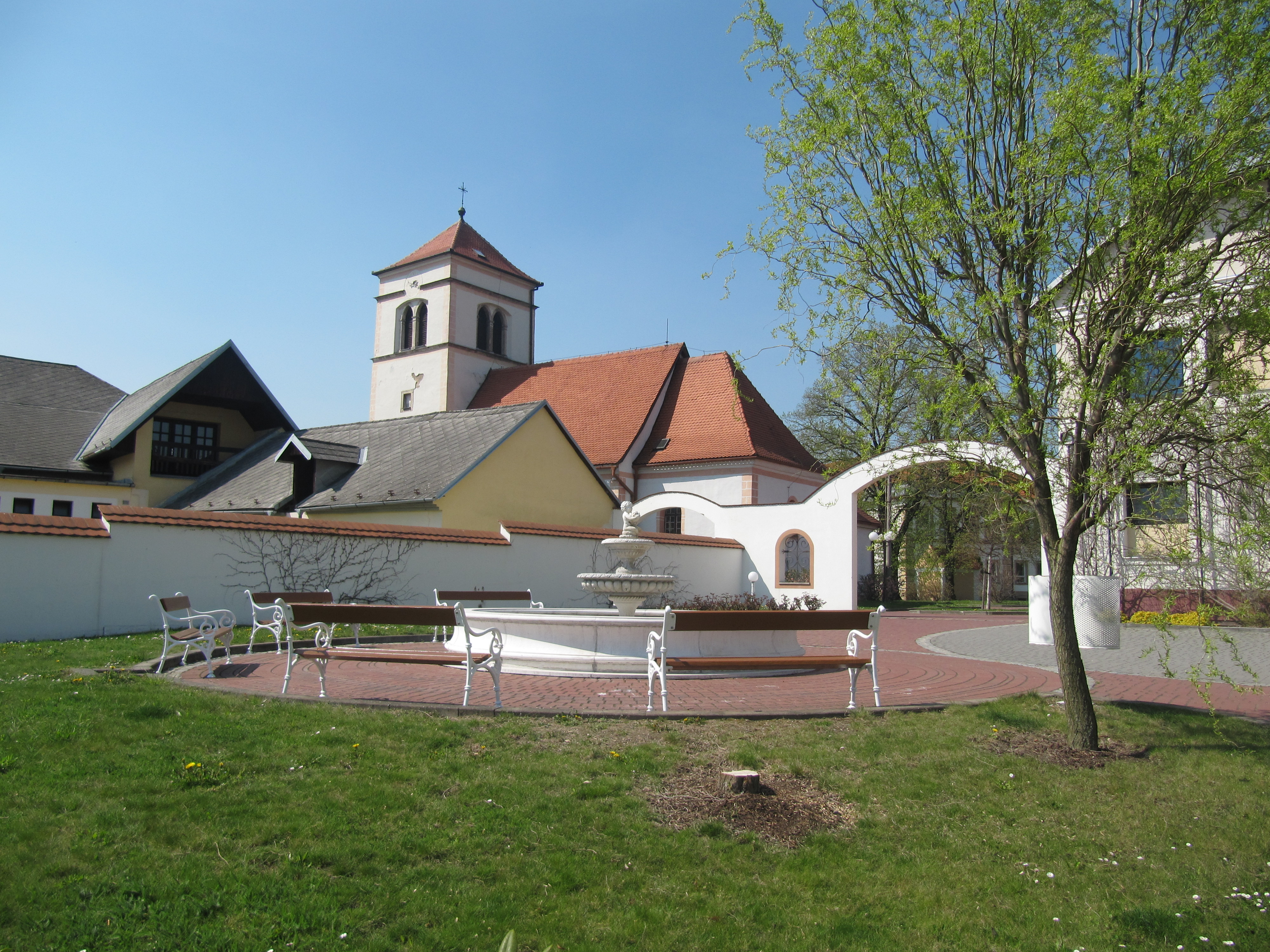
- Park and Church of Saint Martin

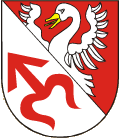
- Flag Coat of arms

- Location in the Czech Republic
- Coordinates: 49°15′7″N 17°30′19″E
- Country: Czech Republic
- Region: Zlín
- District: Zlín
- First mentioned: 1141

Area
  - Total: 15.51 km^{2} (5.99 sq mi)
- Elevation: 186 m (610 ft)

Population (2026-01-01)
  - Total: 2,425
  - Density: 156.4/km^{2} (404.9/sq mi)
- Time zone: UTC+1 (CET)
  - Summer (DST): UTC+2 (CEST)
- Postal code: 763 62
- Website: www.tlumacov.cz

Tlumačov is a municipality and village in Zlín District in the Zlín Region of the Czech Republic. It has about 2,400 inhabitants.

== Geography ==
Tlumačov is located about 12 kilometres (7 mi) west of Zlín. It lies on the border between the Vizovice Highlands and Upper Morava Valley. The highest point is at 308 m (1,010 ft) above sea level. The Mojena Stream flows through the municipal territory. The Morava River flows along the western municipal border, just outside the territory of Tlumačov.

== History ==
The first written mention of Tlumačov is in a deed of Bishop Jindřich Zdík from 1141.

== Demographics ==
Historical population

Year	Pop.	±%
1869	1,490	—
1880	1,908	+28.1%
1890	2,039	+6.9%
1900	2,224	+9.1%
1910	2,285	+2.7%

Year	Pop.	±%
1921	2,183	−4.5%
1930	2,416	+10.7%
1950	2,611	+8.1%
1961	2,647	+1.4%
1970	2,573	−2.8%

Year	Pop.	±%
1980	2,500	−2.8%
1991	2,325	−7.0%
2001	2,404	+3.4%
2011	2,434	+1.2%
2021	2,350	−3.5%

Source: Censuses

== Transport ==
The D55 motorway runs through the municipality.

Tlumačov is located on the railway line Přerov–Břeclav.

== Sights ==
The main landmark of Tlumačov is the Church of Saint Martin. Its existence was first documented in 1373. In 1585, the tower was added. It was reconstructed in 1695, after it was damaged by a fire in 1691.
