= Bohuslavice =

Bohuslavice may refer to places in the Czech Republic:

- Bohuslavice (Jihlava District), a municipality and village in the Vysočina Region
- Bohuslavice (Náchod District), a municipality and village in the Hradec Králové Region
- Bohuslavice (Opava District), a municipality and village in the Moravian-Silesian Region
- Bohuslavice (Prostějov District), a municipality and village in the Olomouc Region
- Bohuslavice (Šumperk District), a municipality and village in the Olomouc Region
- Bohuslavice, a village and part of Kyjov in the South Moravian Region
- Bohuslavice, a village and part of Trutnov in the Hradec Králové Region
- Bohuslavice nad Vláří, a municipality and village in the Zlín Region
- Bohuslavice u Zlína, a municipality and village in the Zlín Region
