= Drnovice =

Drnovice may refer to places in the Czech Republic:

- Drnovice (Blansko District), a municipality and village in the South Moravian Region
- Drnovice (Vyškov District), a municipality and village in the South Moravian Region
  - 1. FK Drnovice, former football club
- Drnovice (Zlín District), a municipality and village in the Zlín Region
