= Štítná nad Vláří-Popov =

- Municipality
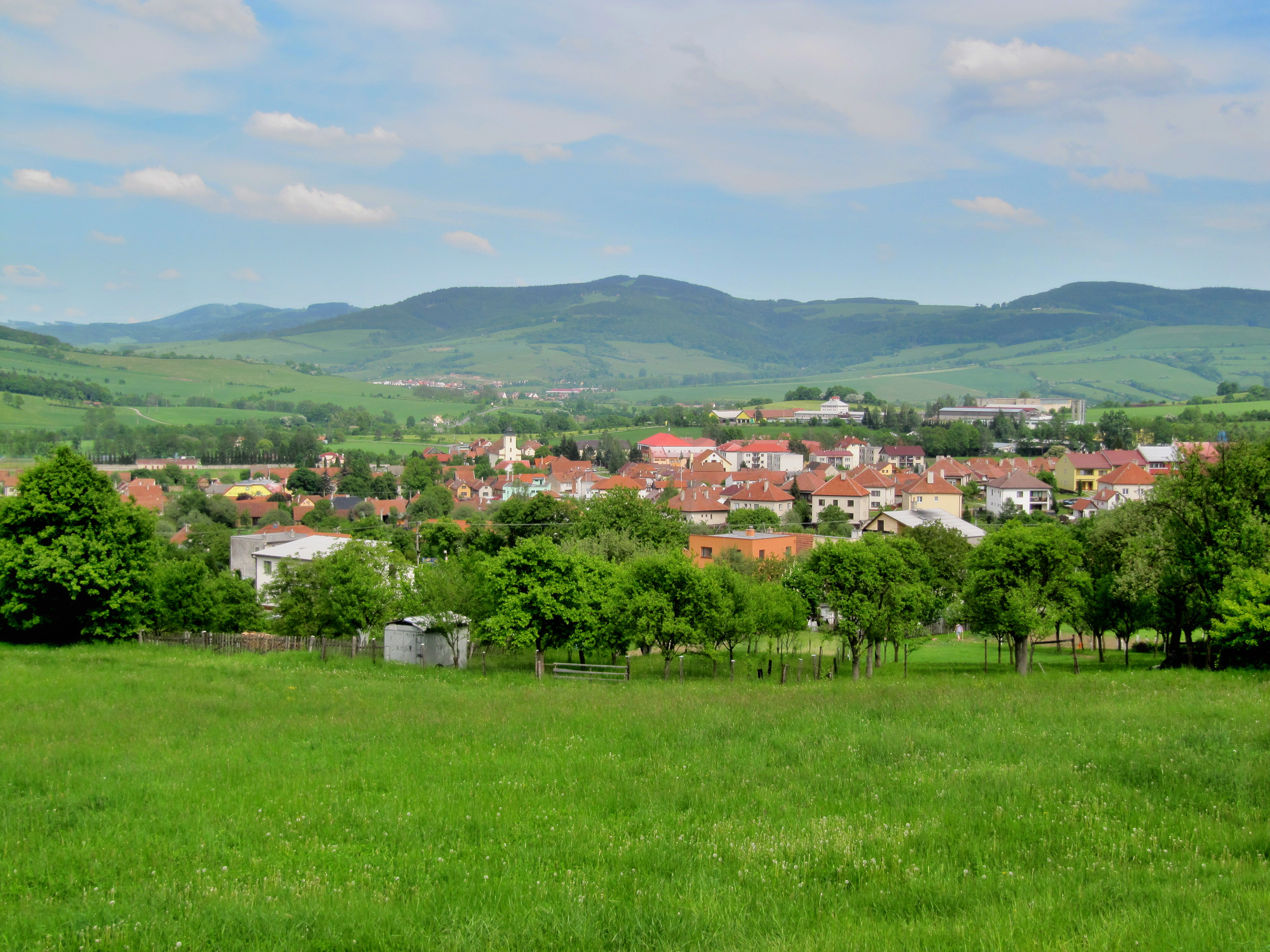
- View of Štítná nad Vláří from the west

- Flag Coat of arms

- Location in the Czech Republic
- Coordinates: 49°4′10″N 17°58′31″E
- Country: Czech Republic
- Region: Zlín
- District: Zlín
- First mentioned: 1374

Area
  - Total: 28.43 km^{2} (10.98 sq mi)
- Elevation: 318 m (1,043 ft)

Population (2026-01-01)
  - Total: 2,067
  - Density: 72.70/km^{2} (188.3/sq mi)
- Time zone: UTC+1 (CET)
  - Summer (DST): UTC+2 (CEST)
- Postal code: 763 33
- Website: www.stitna-popov.cz

Štítná nad Vláří-Popov (Czech pronunciation: [ˈʃciːtnaː ˈnad vlaːr̝iː ˈpopof]) is a municipality in Zlín District in the Zlín Region of the Czech Republic. It has about 2,100 inhabitants. The municipality is located on the Vlára River in the White Carpathians mountain range, on the border with Slovakia.

== Administrative division ==
Štítná nad Vláří-Popov consists of two municipal parts (in brackets population according to the 2021 census):

- Štítná nad Vláří (1,595)
- Popov (448)

== Etymology ==
The name Štítná is probably derived from the Czech word štít (i.e. 'shield'). The village was a defensive fortress (figuratively "shield") against Tatar invasions. The name Popov is derived from the word pop, which is an old Czech word for 'priest'. It refers to the fact that the village was originally a church property.

== Geography ==
Štítná nad Vláří-Popov is located 27 kilometres (17 mi) southeast of Zlín, on the border with Slovakia. It lies in the White Carpathians mountain range and in the Bílé Karpaty Protected Landscape Area. The highest point is at 776 m (2,546 ft) above sea level. The Vlára River flows through the municipality.

== History ==
The first written mention of Štítná and Popov is from 1374. Both villages belonged to the Brumov estate. In 1964, the municipalities of Štítná nad Vláří and Popov were merged.

== Demographics ==
Historical population

Year	Pop.	±%
1869	1,462	—
1880	1,465	+0.2%
1890	1,687	+15.2%
1900	1,836	+8.8%
1910	1,784	−2.8%

Year	Pop.	±%
1921	1,994	+11.8%
1930	2,048	+2.7%
1950	1,954	−4.6%
1961	2,355	+20.5%
1970	2,363	+0.3%

Year	Pop.	±%
1980	2,368	+0.2%
1991	2,348	−0.8%
2001	2,344	−0.2%
2011	2,218	−5.4%
2021	2,043	−7.9%

Source: Censuses

== Transport ==
Popov is located on the railway line Bylnice–Bojkovice.

== Sights ==
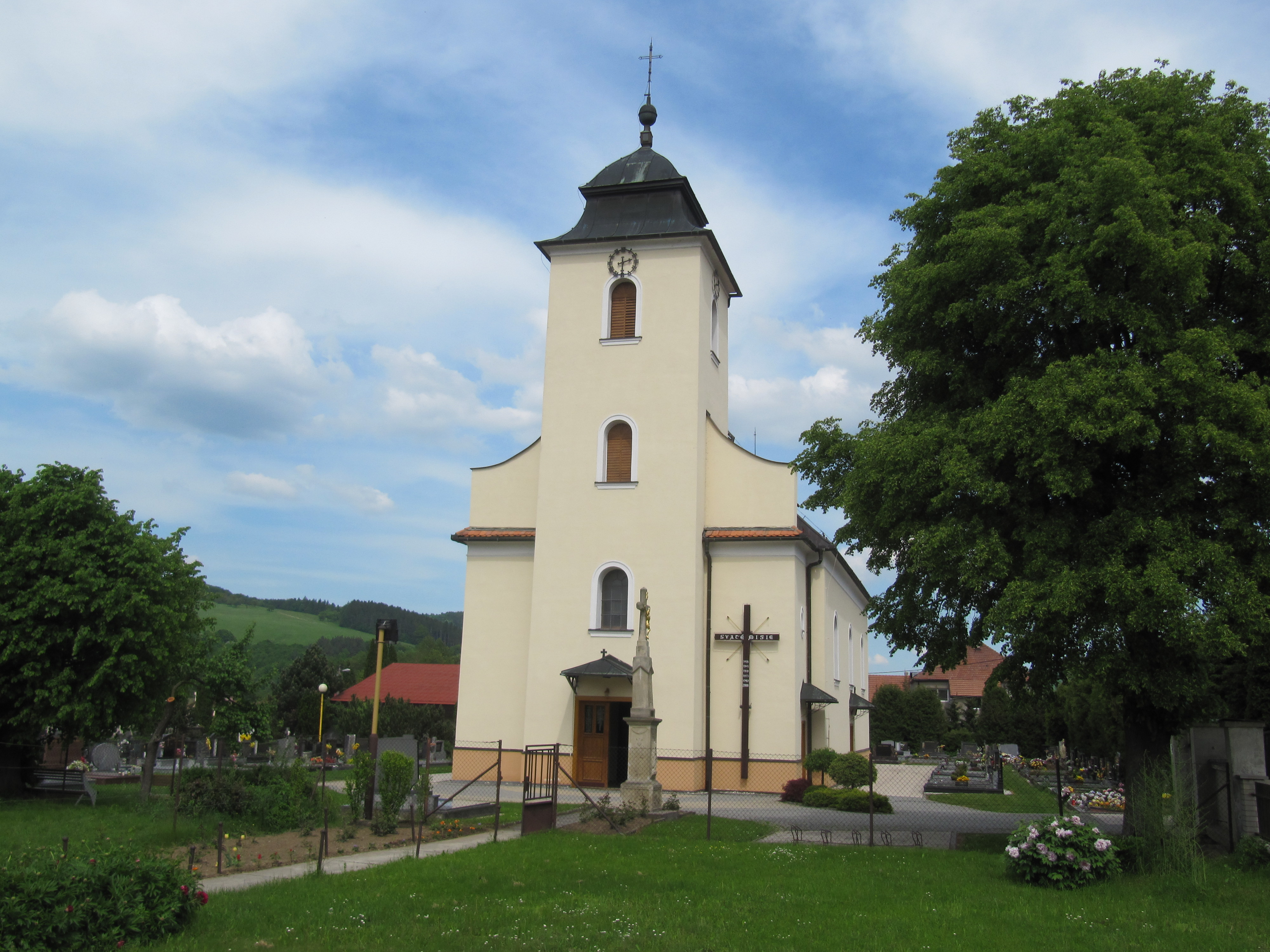
Church of Saint Joseph

The main landmark of the municipality is the Church of Saint Joseph, located in Štítná nad Vláří. It was built in the Baroque style in the second half of the 18th century.

== Twin towns – sister cities ==
Štítná nad Vláří-Popov is twinned with:

- Košeca, Slovakia
