= Valašské Příkazy =

- Municipality
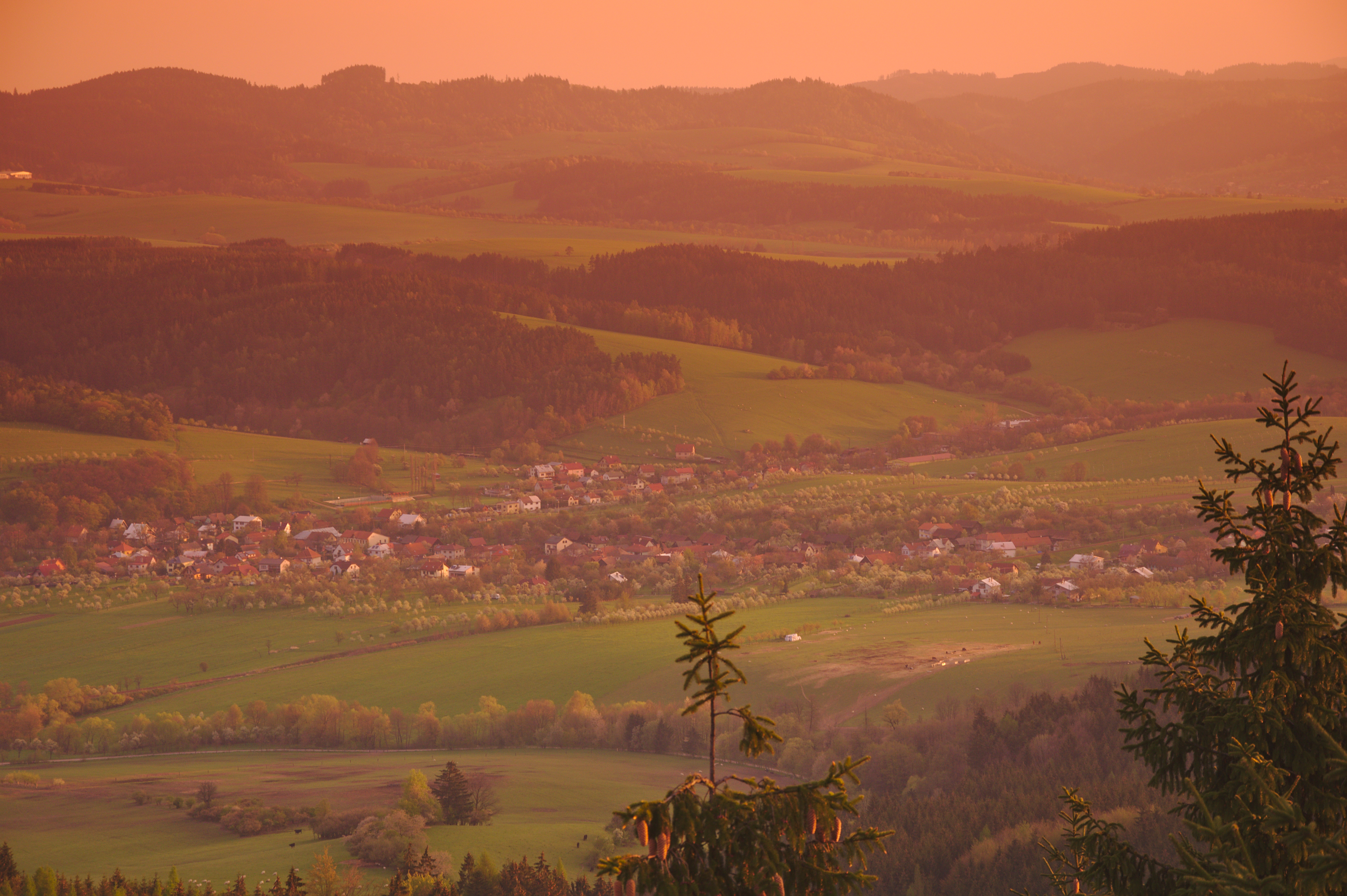
- View from the southwest

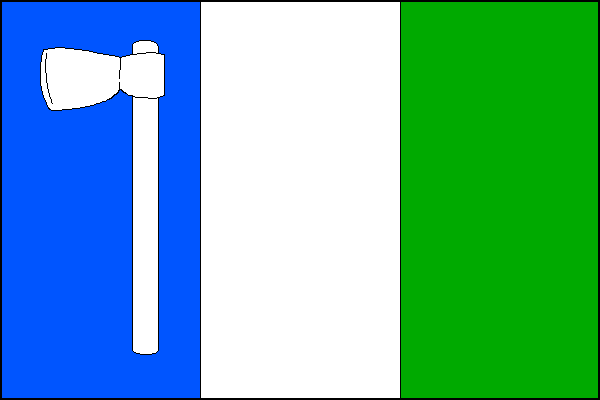
- Flag Coat of arms

- Location in the Czech Republic
- Coordinates: 49°9′57″N 18°3′14″E
- Country: Czech Republic
- Region: Zlín
- District: Zlín
- First mentioned: 1503

Area
  - Total: 2.34 km^{2} (0.90 sq mi)
- Elevation: 440 m (1,440 ft)

Population (2026-01-01)
  - Total: 313
  - Density: 134/km^{2} (346/sq mi)
- Time zone: UTC+1 (CET)
  - Summer (DST): UTC+2 (CEST)
- Postal code: 756 12
- Website: www.valasskeprikazy.cz

Valašské Příkazy is a municipality and village in Zlín District in the Zlín Region of the Czech Republic. It has about 300 inhabitants.

Valašské Příkazy lies approximately 19 kilometres (12 mi) south of Vsetín, 28 km (17 mi) east of Zlín, and 283 km (176 mi) east of Prague.

== History ==
The first written mention of Valašské Příkazy is from 1503, when the village belonged to the Brumov estate.

From 1 January 2021, Valašské Příkazy is no longer a part of Vsetín District and belongs to Zlín District.

== Demographics ==
Historical population
Year	Pop.	±%
1869	183	—
1880	173	−5.5%
1890	184	+6.4%
1900	220	+19.6%
1910	202	−8.2%
1921	200	−1.0%
1930	193	−3.5%
1950	199	+3.1%
1961	233	+17.1%
1970	234	+0.4%
1980	234	+0.0%
1991	233	−0.4%
2001	232	−0.4%
2011	275	+18.5%
2021	305	+10.9%
Source: Censuses
