= Sidonie (Brumov-Bylnice) =

- Village
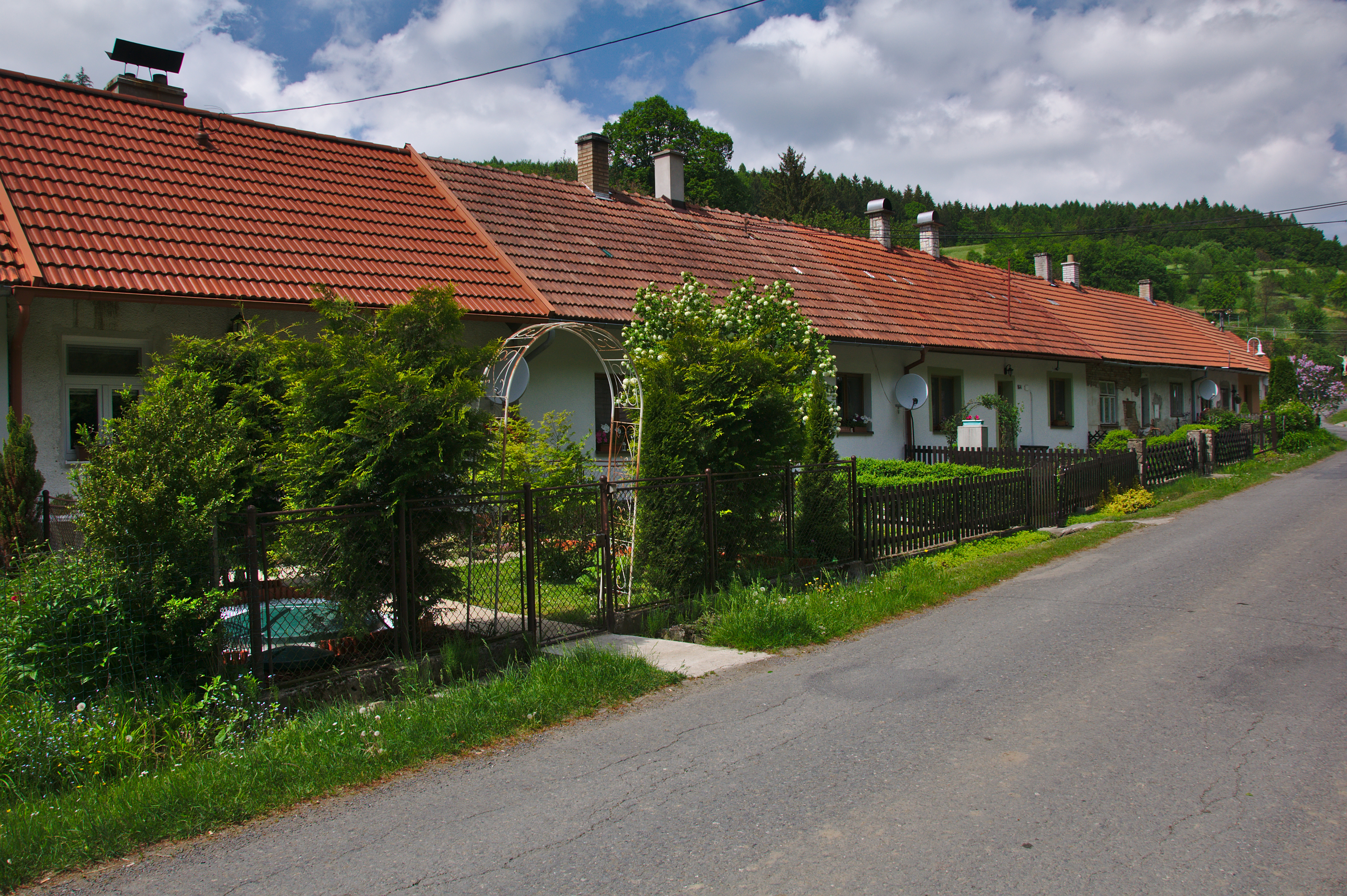
- Workers' colony

- Location in the Czech Republic
- Coordinates: 49°3′13″N 18°5′7″E
- Country: Czech Republic
- Region: Zlín
- District: Zlín
- Municipality: Brumov-Bylnice
- Founded: 1788

Area
  - Total: 7.51 km^{2} (2.90 sq mi)
- Elevation: 365 m (1,198 ft)

Population (2021)
  - Total: 236
  - Density: 31.4/km^{2} (81.4/sq mi)
- Time zone: UTC+1 (CET)
  - Summer (DST): UTC+2 (CEST)
- Postal code: 763 34

Sidonie is a village and municipal part of Brumov-Bylnice in Zlín District in the Zlín Region of the Czech Republic. It is located near the border with Slovakia in the White Carpathians mountain range.

== Geography ==
Sidonie is located in the southeastern part of the territory of Brumov-Bylnice, about 30 kilometres (19 mi) southeast of Zlín. It lies in the White Carpathians mountain range and within the Bílé Karpaty Protected Landscape Area. The built-up area is situated in a narrow valley formed by the Vlárka Stream, which flows along the Czech–Slovak state border. The surrounding area is mountainous and forested. The highest point of the Sidonie area is the Pyrtě mountain at 707 m (2,320 ft) above sea level.

Near the village is the Sidonie Nature Reserve. It has an area of 13.5 ha (33 acres). The subject of protection is the intact beech forest of the White Carpathians.

== History ==
In 1788, a glassworks was established by Count Jan Křitel Illésházy and named Svatá Sidonia (lit. 'saint Sidonia') after his wife Sidonia. A workers' settlement gradually developed around the glassworks. In 1859, the settlement with the glassworks was rented to the entrepreneur Josef Schreiber. During the administration by the Schreiber family, Svatá Sidonia experienced the greatest growth and prosperity. The glassworks ceased operations in 1932.

From the establishment of municipalities in 1848 until 1950, Svatá Sidonia was a municipal part of Bylnice. In 1951, it was renamed Svatá Sidonie and became an independent municipality. In 1960, it was renamed Sidonie. Since 15 July 1976, Sidonie has been a municipal part of Brumov-Bylnice.

The village became known during the dissolution of Czechoslovakia in 1993, when the Vlárka Stream was designated as the state border and part of the village remained on the Slovak side. This led to the division of some families and an international dispute. The dispute was ended in 1997, when the Slovak part of the village was annexed to the Czech Republic in exchange for the settlement of U Sabotů.

== Demographics ==
Historical population

Year	Pop.	±%
1869	444	—
1880	441	−0.7%
1890	301	−31.7%
1900	511	+69.8%
1910	520	+1.8%

Year	Pop.	±%
1921	–	—
1930	521	—
1950	235	−54.9%
1961	474	+101.7%
1970	400	−15.6%

Year	Pop.	±%
1980	345	−13.7%
1991	279	−19.1%
2001	312	+11.8%
2011	295	−5.4%
2021	236	−20.0%

Source: Censuses

== Transport ==
The road border crossing Brumov-Bylnice / Horné Srnie is located in the southernmost part of the Sidonie territory, in the Vlára Pass area. The road border crossing is located on the I/57 road, which connects Vsetín with Dubnica nad Váhom in Slovakia.

In the Vlára pass is the railway station Vlárský průsmyk. It is the terminus and beginning of a short railway line from/to Bylnice, but it is only in operation during the summer season on fridays and weekends.

== Sights ==
The workers' colony documents the standard of living of the glass workers from the end of the 19th and the beginning of the 20th century. However, this unique and historically rare set of former workers' dwellings is today altered by different adjustments of the owners of individual houses. The whole block is covered with a gabled roof with wooden dormers. The area is protected as a cultural monument.
