= Návojná =

- Municipality
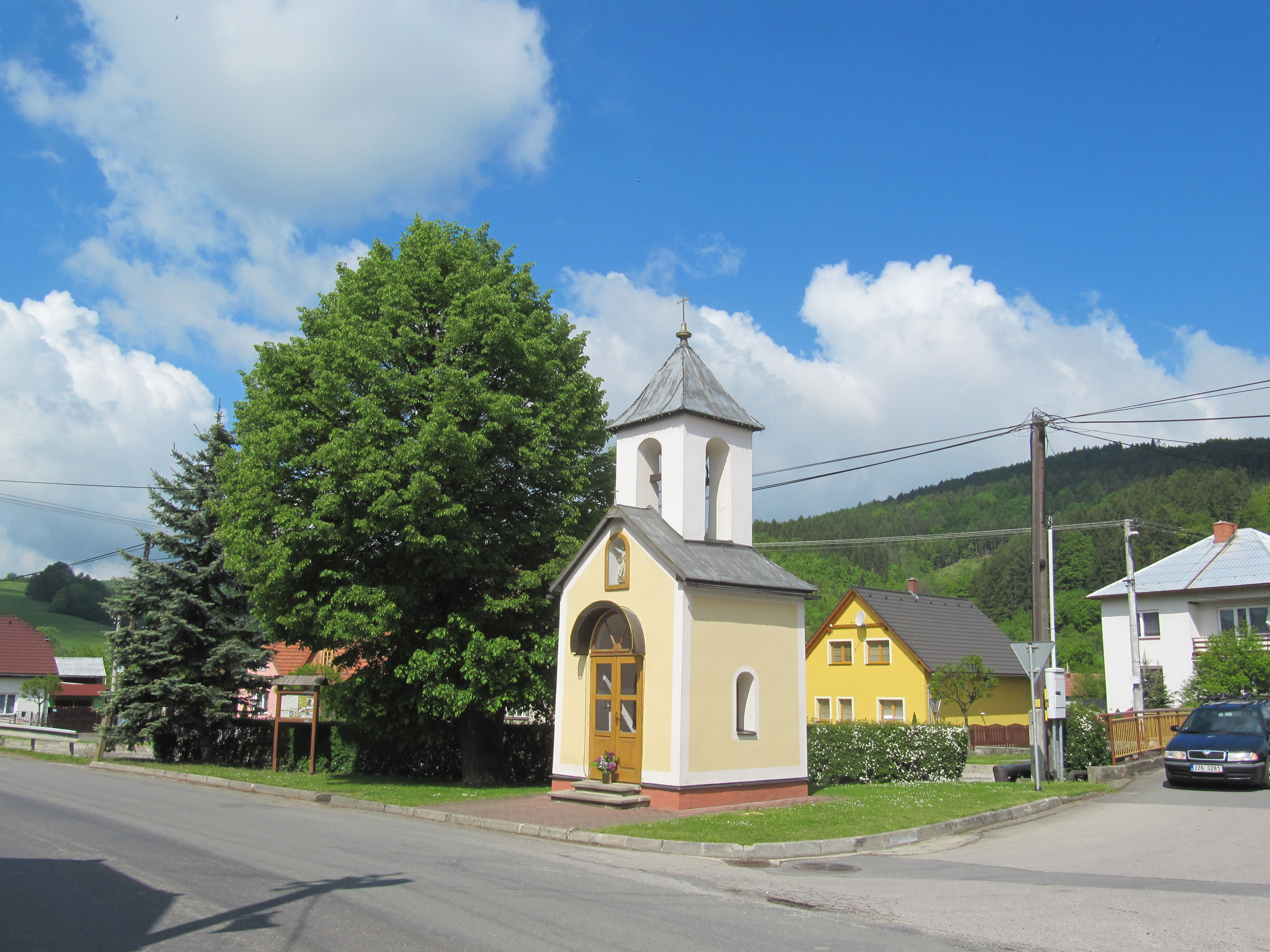
- Chapel of the Holy Trinity

- Flag Coat of arms

- Location in the Czech Republic
- Coordinates: 49°6′30″N 18°3′11″E
- Country: Czech Republic
- Region: Zlín
- District: Zlín
- First mentioned: 1503

Area
  - Total: 8.00 km^{2} (3.09 sq mi)
- Elevation: 370 m (1,210 ft)

Population (2026-01-01)
  - Total: 683
  - Density: 85.4/km^{2} (221/sq mi)
- Time zone: UTC+1 (CET)
  - Summer (DST): UTC+2 (CEST)
- Postal code: 763 32
- Website: www.navojna.cz

Návojná is a municipality and village in Zlín District in the Zlín Region of the Czech Republic. It has about 700 inhabitants.

Návojná lies approximately 32 kilometres (20 mi) south-east of Zlín and 284 km (176 mi) south-east of Prague.

== History ==
The first written mention of Návojná is from 1503, when the village belonged to the Brumov estate.

== Demographics ==
Historical population
| Year | Pop. | ±% |
|---|---|---|
| 1869 | 438 | — |
| 1880 | 476 | +8.7% |
| 1890 | 467 | −1.9% |
| 1900 | 440 | −5.8% |
| 1910 | 465 | +5.7% |
| 1921 | 482 | +3.7% |
| 1930 | 495 | +2.7% |
| 1950 | 490 | −1.0% |
| 1961 | 617 | +25.9% |
| 1970 | 691 | +12.0% |
| 1980 | 760 | +10.0% |
| 1991 | 722 | −5.0% |
| 2001 | 720 | −0.3% |
| 2011 | 734 | +1.9% |
| 2021 | 678 | −7.6% |
Source: Censuses

== Sights ==
Návojský dub is a 300 years old protected oak. The oak has a diameter of 441 centimetres (174 in).

The main cultural landmark of the village is the Chapel of the Holy Trinity.
