= Nemšová =

- Municipality
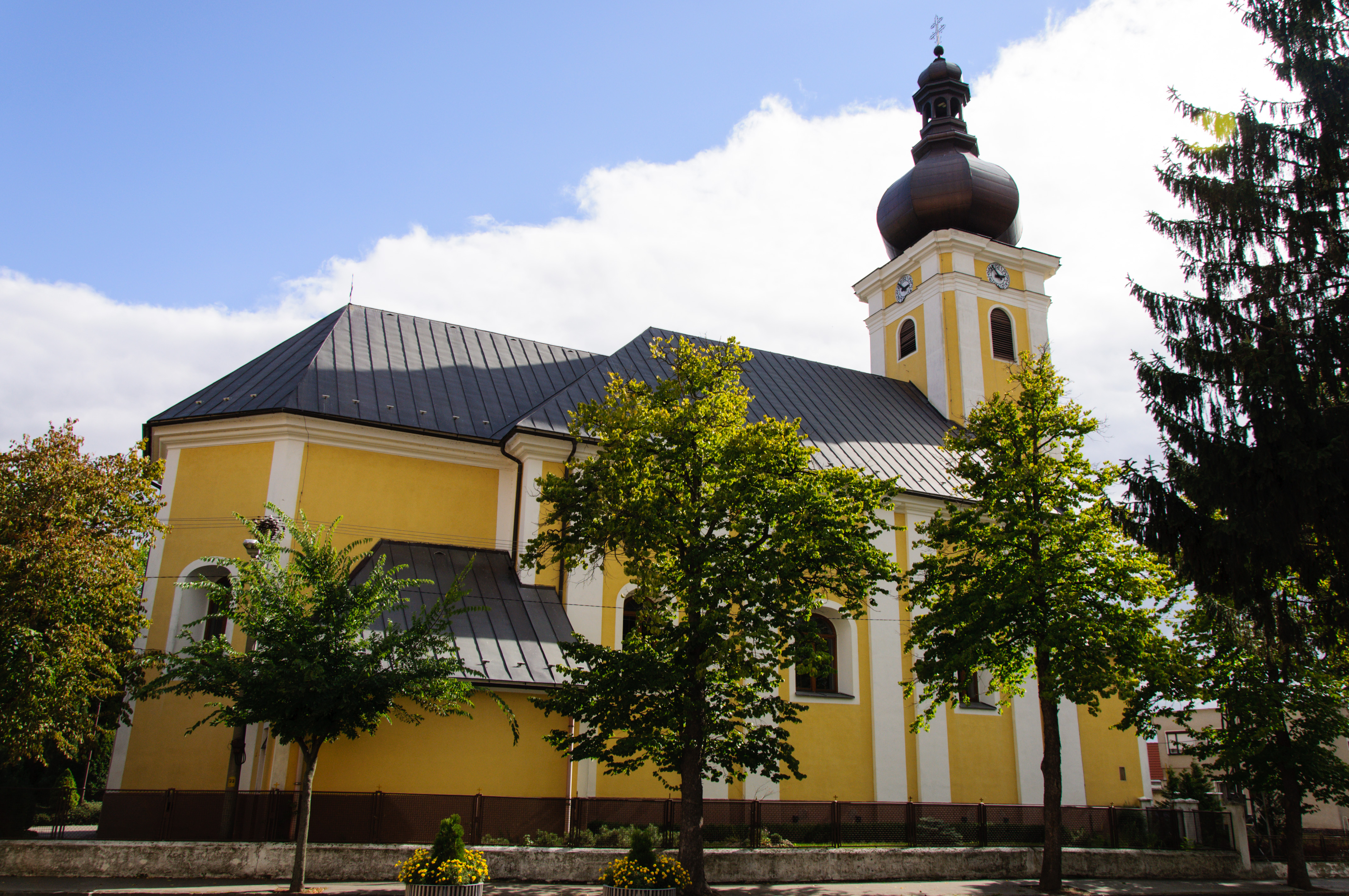
- Church of Saint Archangel Michael

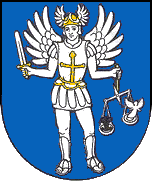
- Flag Coat of arms

- Location of Nemšová in the Trenčín Region Location of Nemšová in Slovakia
- Coordinates: 48.96°N 18.12°E
- Country: Slovakia
- Region: Trenčín Region
- District: Trenčín District
- First mentioned: 1242

Government
  - Mayor: Ján Mindár

Area
  - Total: 33.44 km^{2} (12.91 sq mi)
- Elevation: 245 m (804 ft)

Population (2025)
  - Total: 6,132
- Time zone: UTC+1 (CET)
  - Summer (DST): UTC+2 (CEST)
- Postal code: 914 41
- Area code: +421 32
- Vehicle registration plate (until 2022): TN
- Website: www.nemsova.sk

Nemšová (Hungarian: Nemsó) is a town in the Trenčín District, Trenčín Region in northwestern Slovakia.

== Geography ==
The municipality lies at an altitude of 245 metres (804 ft) and covers an area of 33.44 km^{2} (12.91 sq mi) (2025).

Nemšová is located in the Ilava Basin at the confluence of the Váh and Vlára rivers, at the foothills of the White Carpathians. It is 15 km (9.32 mi) from Trenčín and 10 km (6.21 mi) from the Czech border.

== History ==
The first written record about Nemšová was in 1246. The present-day town exists since 1989, when it was created by merger of the villages of Nemšová, Ľuborča, Kľúčové and Trenčianska Závada.

== Population ==
Population statistic (10 years)
Year	1995	2005	2015	2025
Count	6101	6225	6315	6132
Difference		+2.03%	+1.44%	−2.89%

Population statistic
Year	2024	2025
Count	6172	6132
Difference		−0.64%

It has a population of 6132 people (31 December 2025).

=== Ethnicity ===
Census 2021 (1+ %)
Ethnicity	Number	Fraction
Slovak	5997	94.66%
Not found out	297	4.68%
Total	6335	

In year 2021 was 6335 people by ethnicity 5997 as Slovak, 297 as Not found out, 58 as Czech, 10 as Hungarian, 10 as Other, 7 as Russian, 6 as Polish, 5 as Rusyn, 5 as Bulgarian, 4 as Ukrainian, 4 as Romani, 4 as German, 3 as Vietnamese, 3 as English, 2 as Irish, 1 as Italian, 1 as Moravian and 1 as Albanian.

Note on population: The difference values of population numbers in the table "Population statistic" and in the sections "Ethnicity" & "Religion" is caused by the use of various statistical methods.

=== Religion ===
Census 2021 (1+ %)
Religion	Number	Fraction
Roman Catholic Church	4953	78.18%
None	901	14.22%
Not found out	312	4.93%
Total	6335	

In year 2021 was 6335 people by religion 4953 from Roman Catholic Church, 901 from None, 312 from Not found out, 50 from Evangelical Church, 23 from Greek Catholic Church, 21 from Christian Congregations in Slovakia, 19 from Ad hoc movements, 13 from Other and not ascertained christian church, 12 from Other, 6 from Buddhism, 5 from Eastern Orthodox Church, 5 from Apostolic Church, 4 from Calvinist Church, 4 from Jehovah's Witnesses, 3 from Islam, 1 from Old Catholic Church, 1 from United Methodist Church, 1 from Czechoslovak Hussite Church and 1 from Baptists Church.

According to the 2001 census, the town had 6,136 inhabitants. 98.1% of inhabitants were Slovaks, 1.1% Czechs and 0.1% Moravians. The religious makeup was 92.9% Roman Catholics, 4.6% people with no religious affiliation, and 0.6% Lutherans.

== Twin towns — sister cities ==
Nemšová is twinned with:

- Hluk, Czech Republic
