= Vlára =

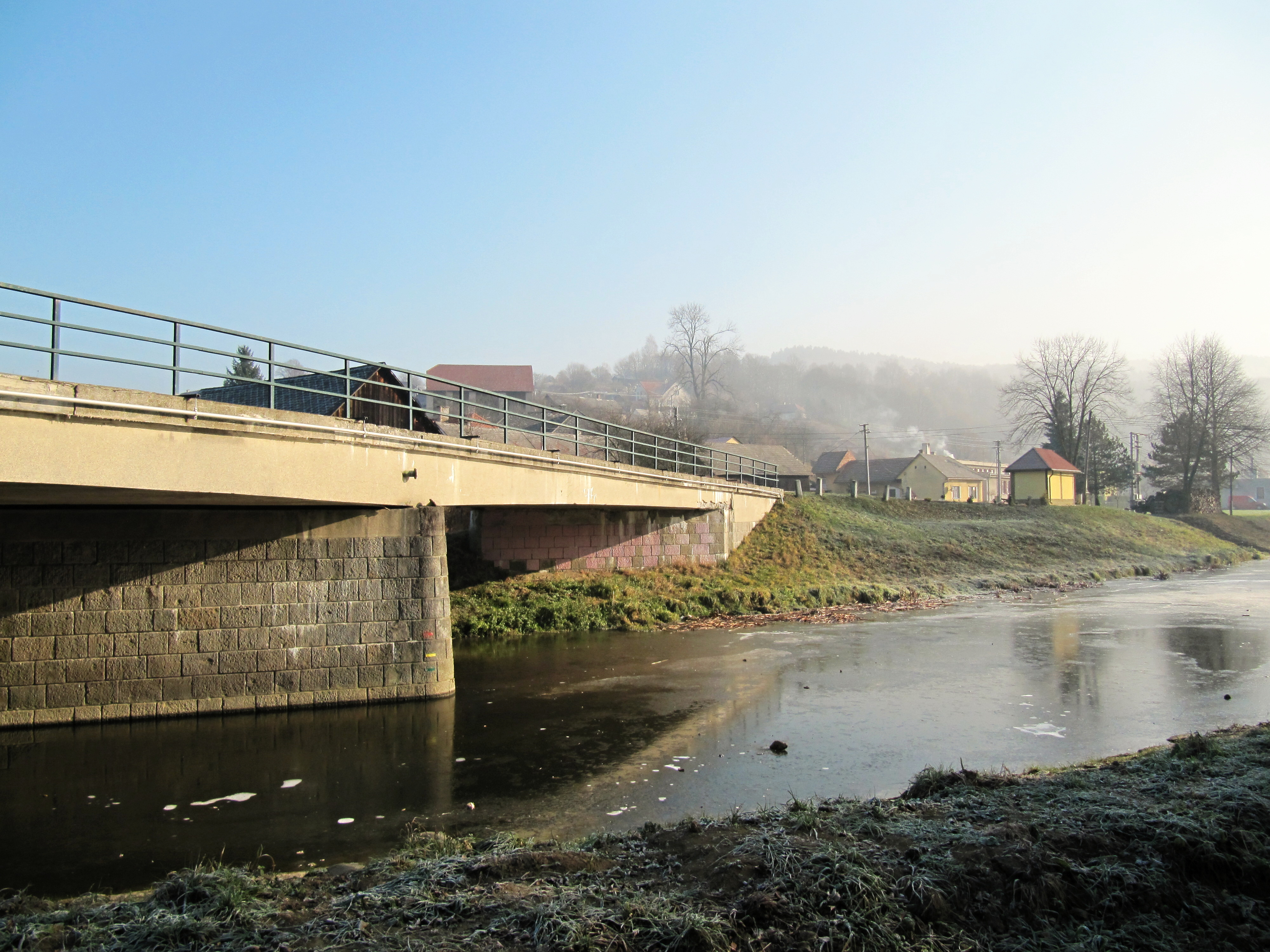
- The Vlára in Bohuslavice nad Vláří

Location
- Countries: Czech Republic; Slovakia
- Regions (CZ)/ Regions (SK): Zlín; Trenčín

Physical characteristics
- Source
  - location: Drnovice, Vizovice Highlands
  - coordinates: 49°12′51″N 17°57′48″E
  - elevation: 652 m (2,139 ft)
- Mouth
  - location: Váh
  - coordinates: 48°57′22″N 18°6′46″E
  - elevation: 218 m (715 ft)
- Length: 44.7 km (27.8 mi)
- Basin size: 371.6 km^{2} (143.5 sq mi)
- Discharge
  - average: 3.4 m^{3}/s (120 cu ft/s) near estuary

Basin features
- Progression: Váh→ Danube→ Black Sea

The Vlára is a river in the Czech Republic and Slovakia, a right tributary of the Váh. It flows through the Zlín Region in the Czech Republic and through the Trenčín Region in Slovakia. It is 44.7 km (27.8 mi) long. It is the only significant watercourse in the Czech Republic that does not belong to the Elbe, Morava and Oder river basins.

== Etymology ==
The name is of Celtic origin, derived from the word uolra. The root uel- meant 'to roll', 'rush'.

== Characteristic ==
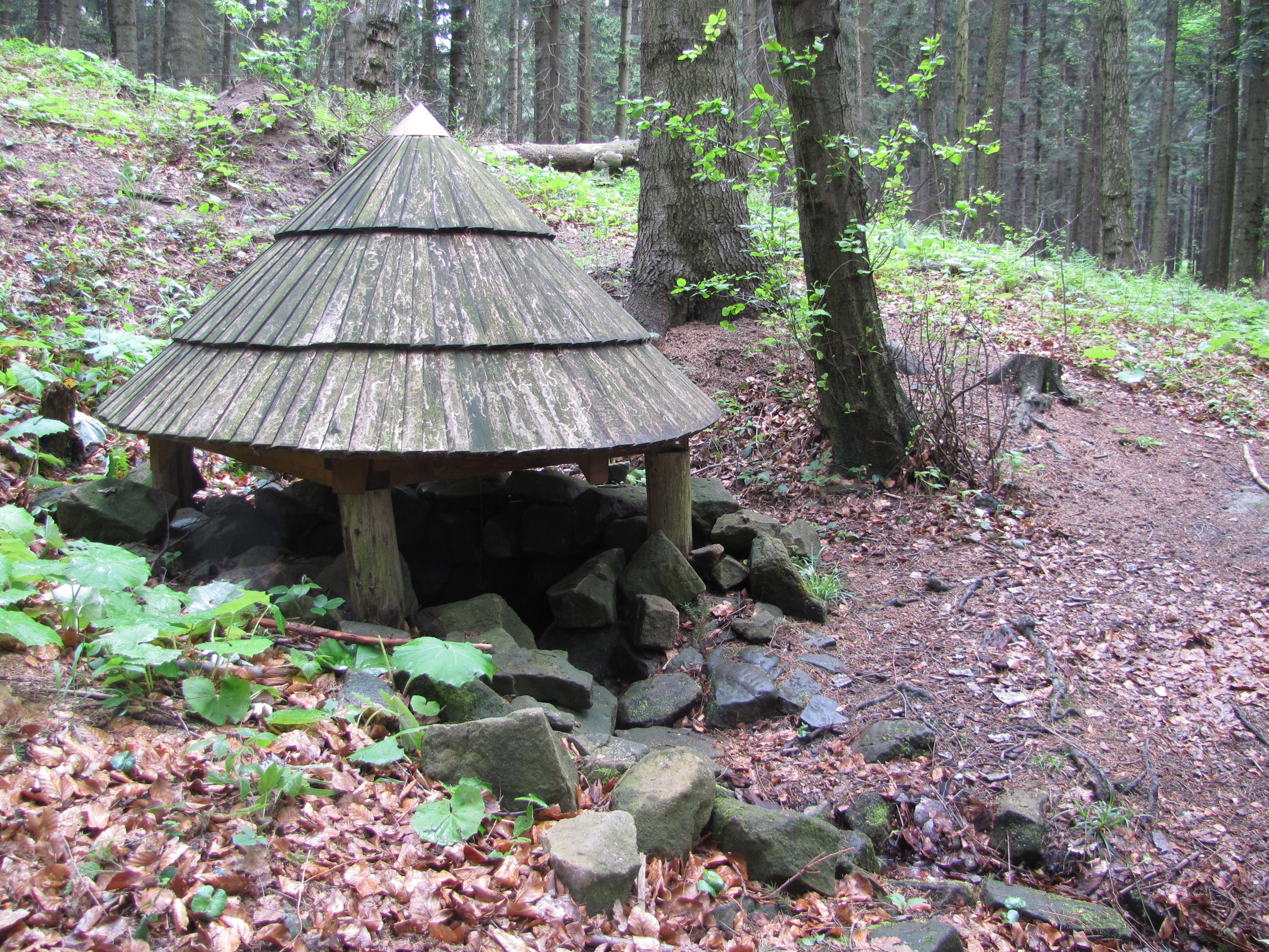
Spring of the Vlára

The Vlára originates in the territory of Drnovice in the Vizovice Highlands at an elevation of 652 m (2,139 ft) and flows to Nemšová, where it merges with the Váh River at an elevation of 218 m (715 ft). It is 44.7 km (27.8 mi) long, of which 33.8 km (21.0 mi) is in the Czech Republic and 10.9 km (6.8 mi) is in Slovakia. Its drainage basin has an area of 371.6 km^{2} (143.5 sq mi), of which 303.1 km^{2} (117.0 sq mi) is in the Czech Republic.

The longest tributaries of the Vlára are:

| Tributary | Length (km) | Side |
|---|---|---|
| Brumovka | 19.2 | left |
| Smolinka | 15.9 | left |
| Říka | 14.3 | right |
| Rokytenka | 9.2 | right |

== Course ==
The river flows through the territories of Drnovice, Tichov, Vysoké Pole, Vlachova Lhota, Vlachovice, Bohuslavice nad Vláří, Jestřabí, Štítná nad Vláří-Popov and Brumov-Bylnice in the Czech Republic, and continues through the territories of Horné Srnie and Nemšová in Slovakia.

The Vlára leaves the Czech Republic through the Vlára Pass. It is a typical example of stream capture. Originally a tributary of the Morava, the Vlára cut through the ridge of the White Carpathians mountains due to erosion, creating the Vlára Pass and making the river a tributary of the Váh. The Vlára is the only significant stream in the Czech Republic that does not fall within the Elbe, Morava and Oder river basins.

== See also ==
- List of rivers of the Czech Republic
- List of rivers of Slovakia
