= Drnovice (Zlín District) =

- Municipality
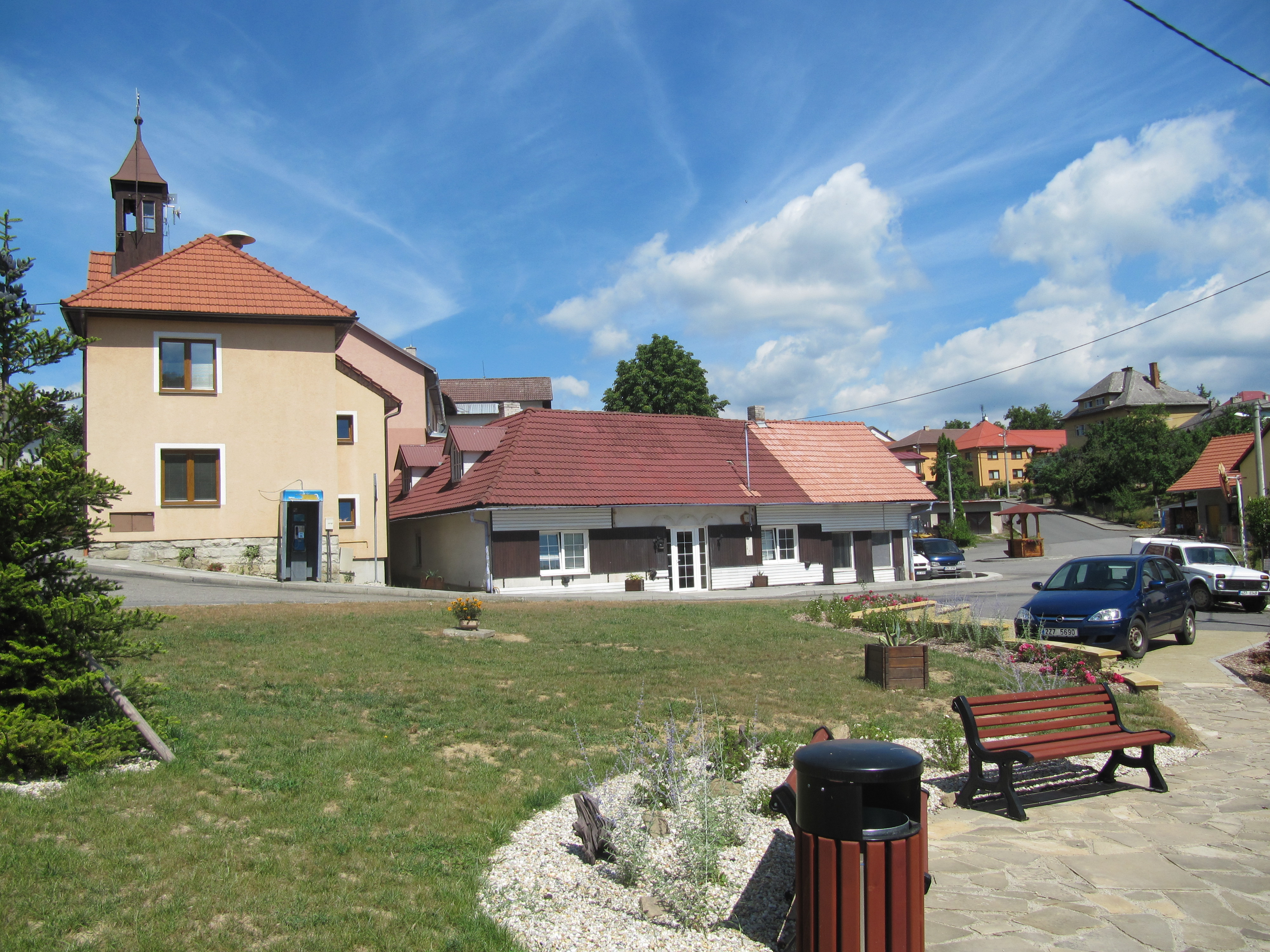
- Centre of Drnovice

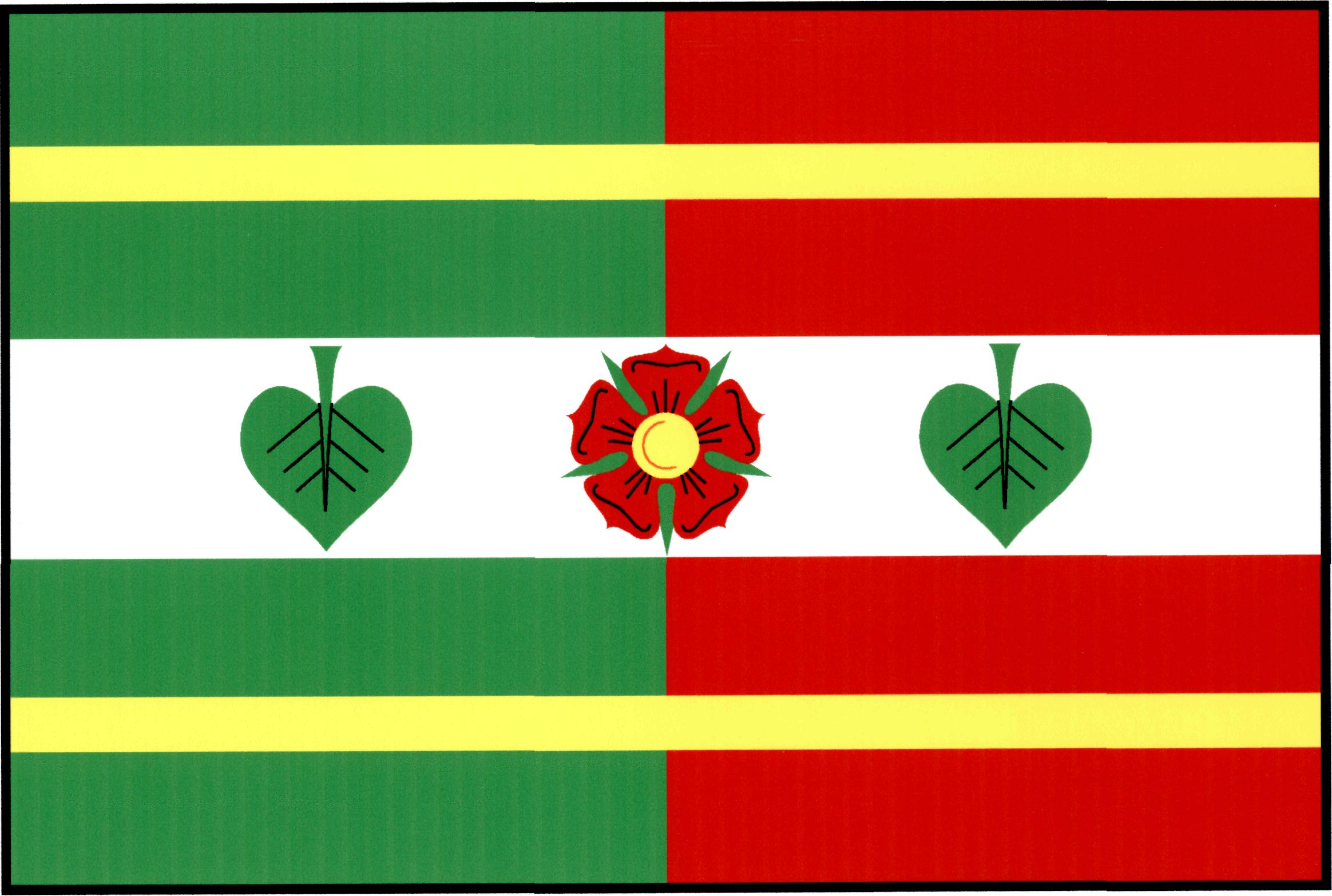
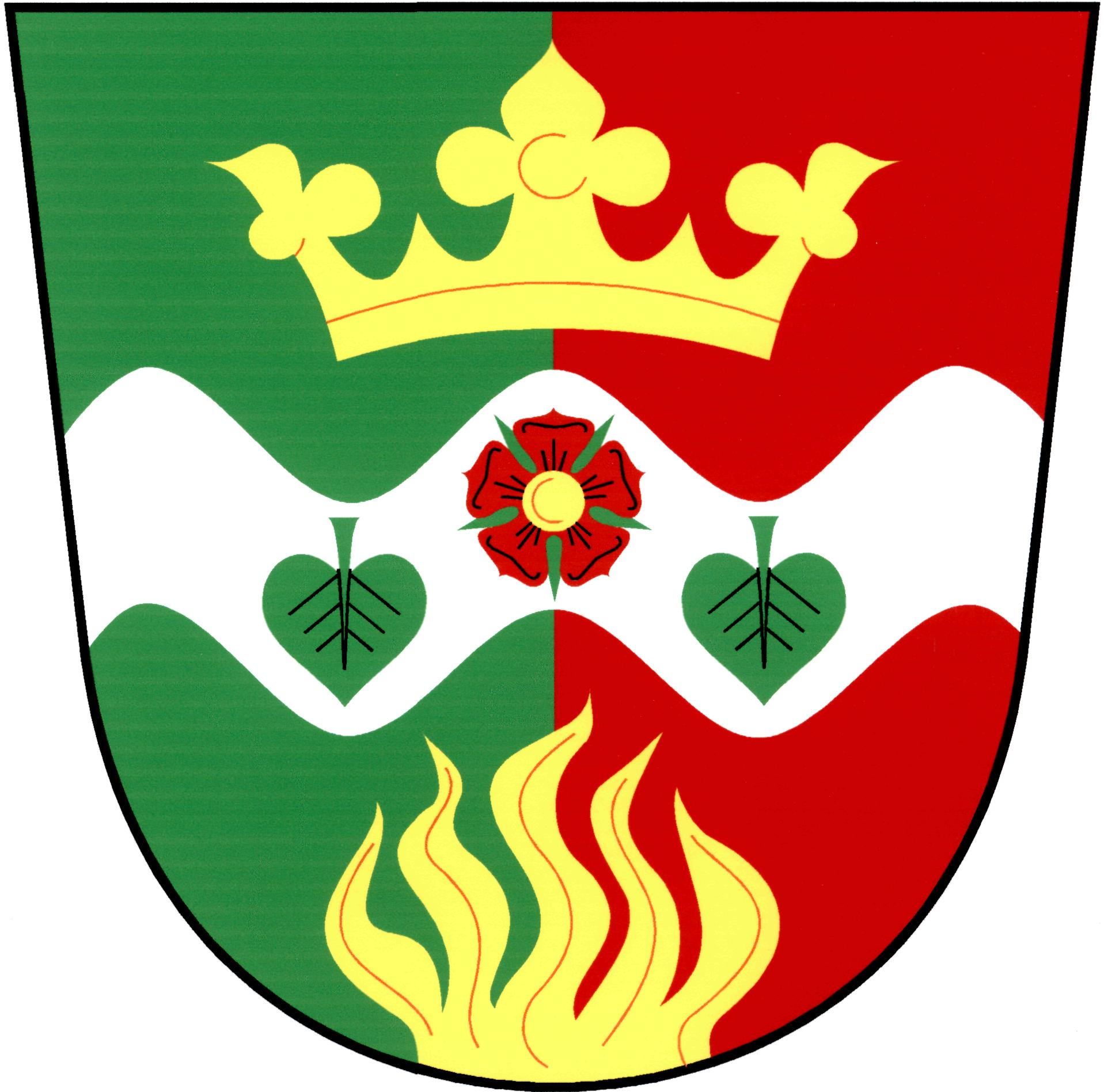
- Flag Coat of arms

- Location in the Czech Republic
- Coordinates: 49°10′44″N 17°57′26″E
- Country: Czech Republic
- Region: Zlín
- District: Zlín
- First mentioned: 1261

Area
  - Total: 7.62 km^{2} (2.94 sq mi)
- Elevation: 416 m (1,365 ft)

Population (2026-01-01)
  - Total: 457
  - Density: 60.0/km^{2} (155/sq mi)
- Time zone: UTC+1 (CET)
  - Summer (DST): UTC+2 (CEST)
- Postal code: 763 25
- Website: www.obec-drnovice.cz

Drnovice is a municipality and village in Zlín District in the Zlín Region of the Czech Republic. It has about 500 inhabitants.

Drnovice lies approximately 22 kilometres (14 mi) east of Zlín and 275 km (171 mi) east of Prague. The Vlára River originates in the municipality and flows through the village.

== Demographics ==
Historical population
Year	Pop.	±%
1869	489	—
1880	502	+2.7%
1890	512	+2.0%
1900	530	+3.5%
1910	572	+7.9%
1921	583	+1.9%
1930	568	−2.6%
1950	554	−2.5%
1961	668	+20.6%
1970	597	−10.6%
1980	542	−9.2%
1991	480	−11.4%
2001	451	−6.0%
2011	405	−10.2%
2021	406	+0.2%
Source: Censuses
