= Bohuslavice (Šumperk District) =

- Municipality
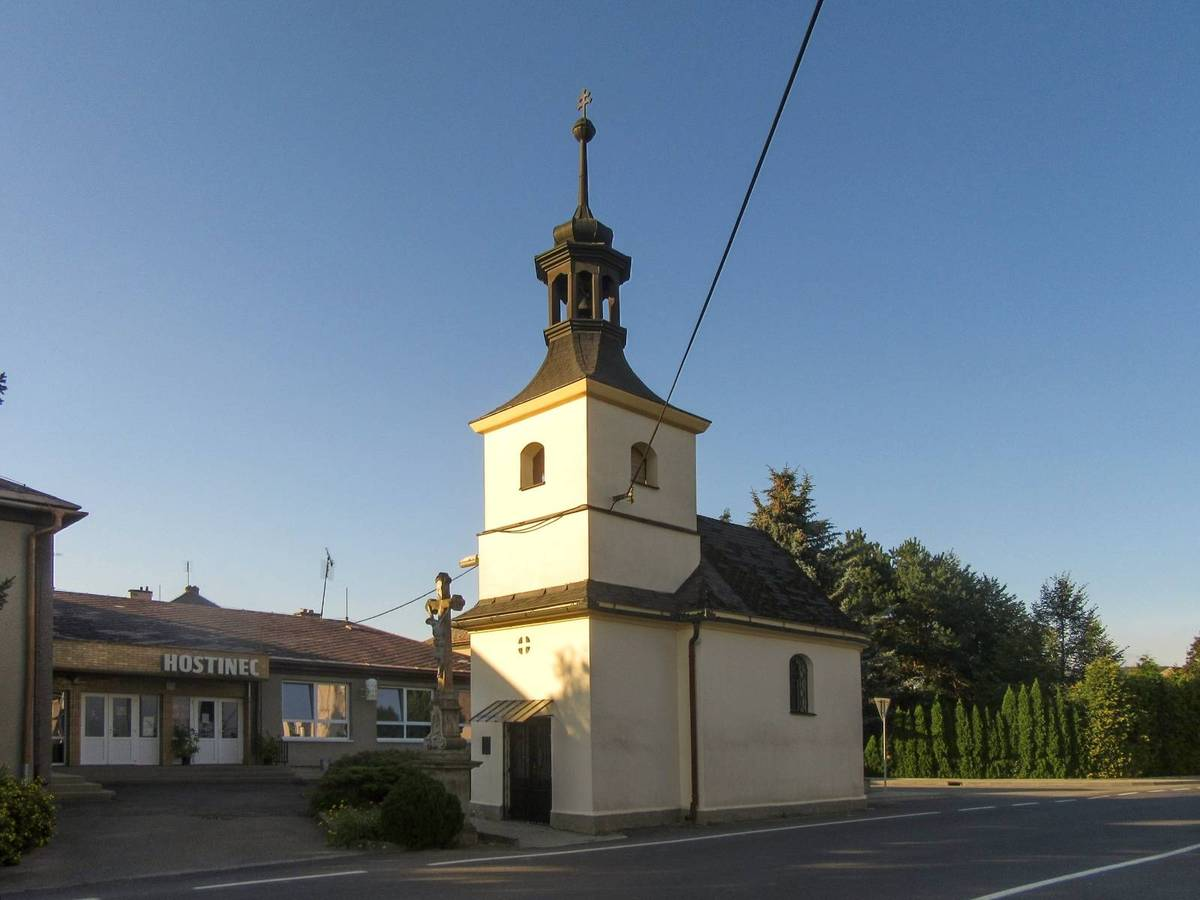
- Chapel of Saints Peter and Paul

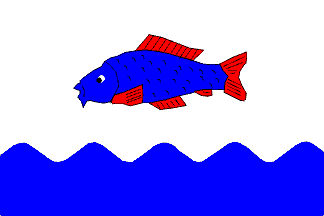
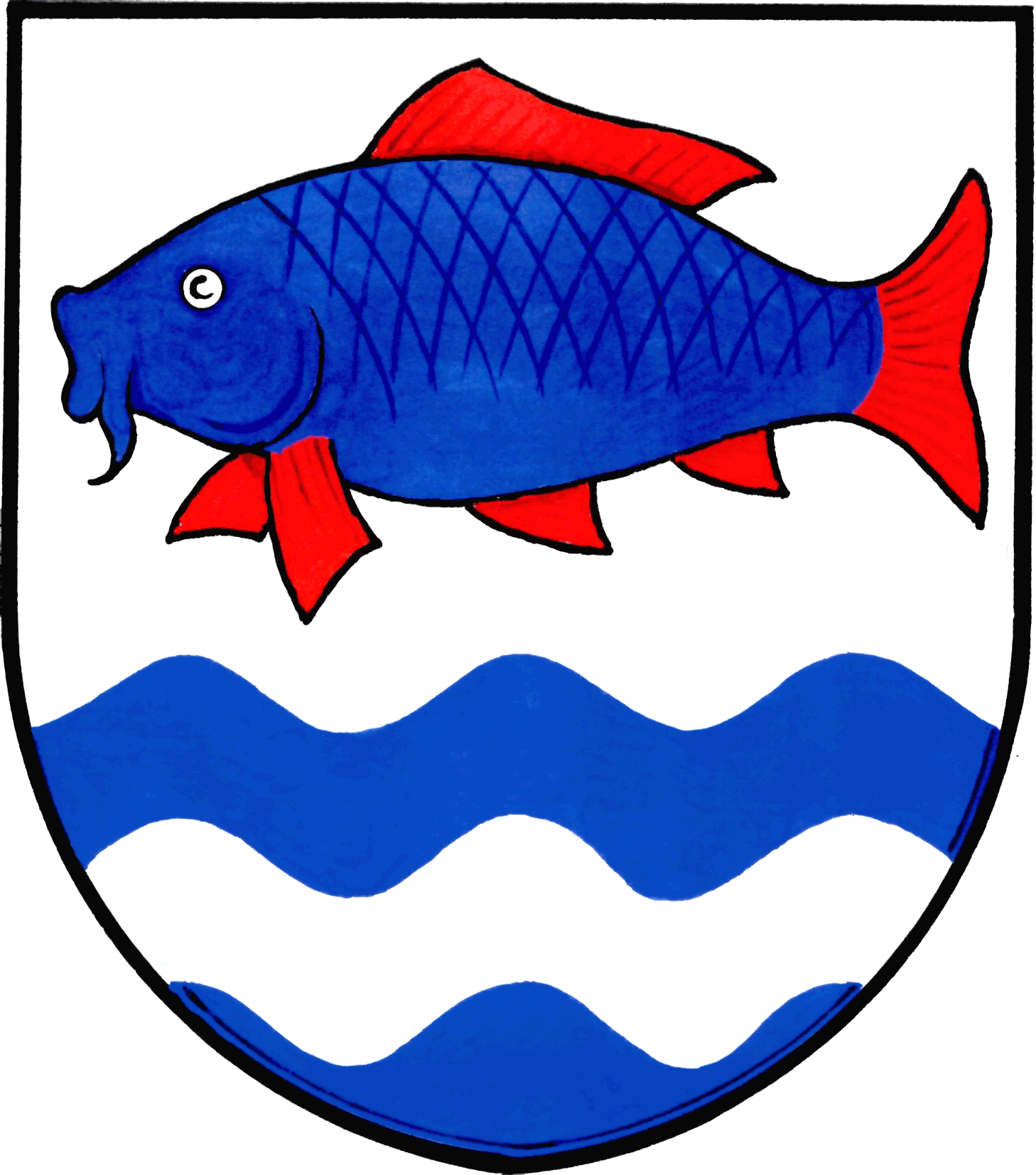
- Flag Coat of arms

- Location in the Czech Republic
- Coordinates: 49°49′34″N 16°56′26″E
- Country: Czech Republic
- Region: Olomouc
- District: Šumperk
- First mentioned: 1356

Area
  - Total: 3.97 km^{2} (1.53 sq mi)
- Elevation: 259 m (850 ft)

Population (2026-01-01)
  - Total: 490
  - Density: 120/km^{2} (320/sq mi)
- Time zone: UTC+1 (CET)
  - Summer (DST): UTC+2 (CEST)
- Postal codes: 789 72
- Website: www.bohuslavice.cz

Bohuslavice (German: Bohuslawitz) is a municipality and village in Šumperk District in the Olomouc Region of the Czech Republic. It has about 500 inhabitants.

== Etymology ==
The name is derived from the personal name Bohuslav. According to legend, it was a fisherman who managed the fishponds belonging to the nobility and for his services was commissioned to establish a village.

== Geography ==
Bohuslavice is located about 15 kilometres (9 mi) south of Šumperk and 33 km (21 mi) northwest of Olomouc. It lies in a flat agricultural landscape in the Mohelnice Depression. The municipality is situated in a floodplain of the Morava River, in the Haná fertile region. The Morava partially forms the western border of the municipality.

== History ==
The first written mention of Bohuslavice is from 1356. The village was founded in around 1250. The population was purely Czech, without German minority. In the 15th century, a set of fish ponds was created here.

Bohuslavice was completely destroyed during the Thirty Years' War. After the war, the village was resettled, again only by Czechs. In the mid-19th century, the set of ponds was dissolved.

The municipality was ceded to Nazi Germany after the Munich Agreement in 1938, and incorporated into the Reichsgau Sudetenland, even though the village was entirely ethnically Czech.

Bohuslavice suffered several major floods in the 19th and 20th century, including the 1997 Central European flood.

== Demographics ==
Historical population

Year	Pop.	±%
1869	556	—
1880	559	+0.5%
1890	557	−0.4%
1900	594	+6.6%
1910	555	−6.6%

Year	Pop.	±%
1921	555	+0.0%
1930	551	−0.7%
1950	448	−18.7%
1961	474	+5.8%
1970	428	−9.7%

Year	Pop.	±%
1980	464	+8.4%
1991	430	−7.3%
2001	470	+9.3%
2011	501	+6.6%
2021	491	−2.0%

Source: Censuses

== Transport ==
There are no railways or major roads passing through the municipality.

== Sights ==
The main landmark of Bohuslavice is the Chapel of Saints Peter and Paul. It dates from the second half of the 19th century.
