= Bohuslavice (Jihlava District) =

- Municipality
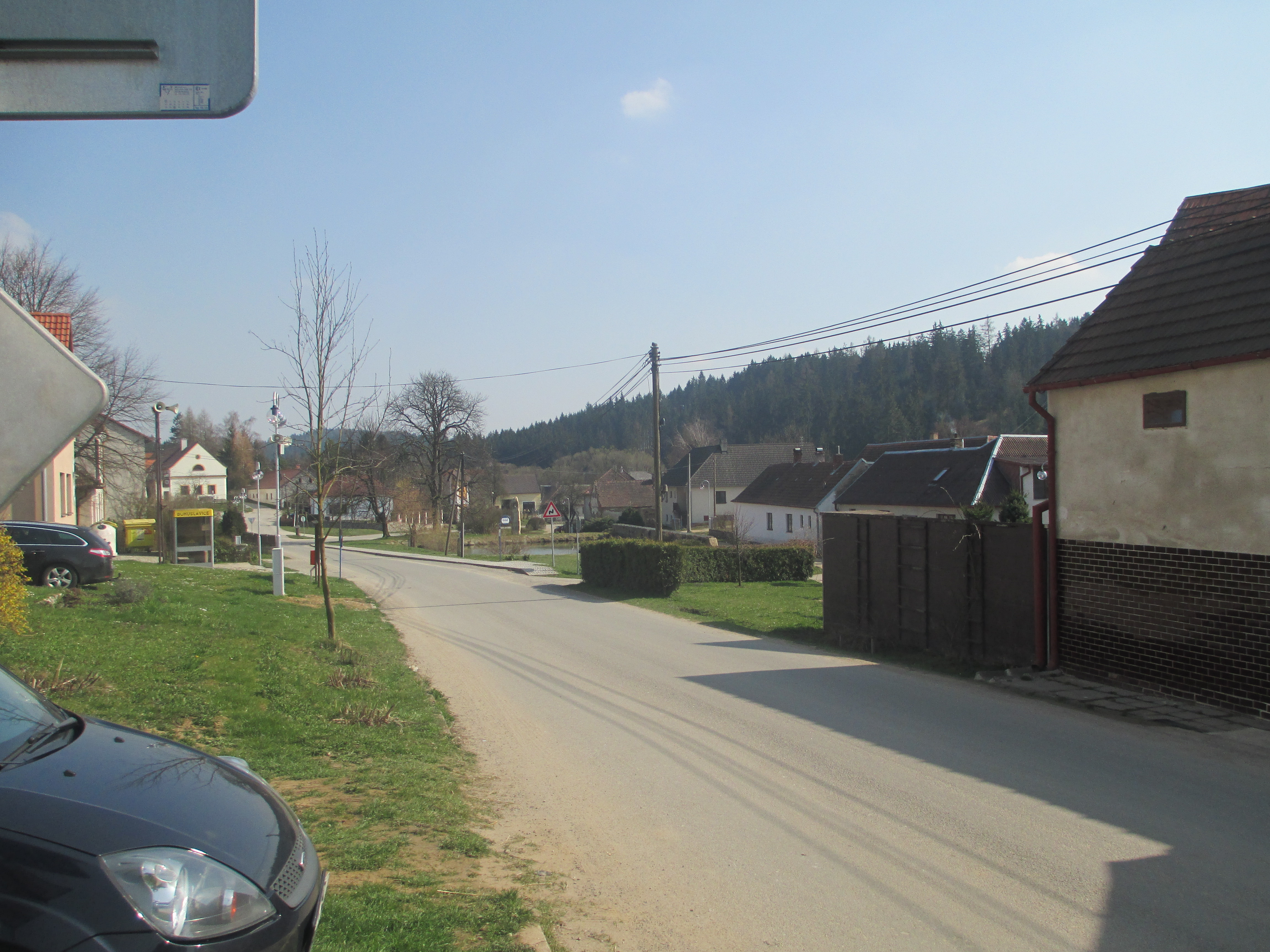
- Centre of Bohuslavice

- Location in the Czech Republic
- Coordinates: 49°8′58″N 15°34′33″E
- Country: Czech Republic
- Region: Vysočina
- District: Jihlava
- First mentioned: 1353

Area
  - Total: 3.75 km^{2} (1.45 sq mi)
- Elevation: 542 m (1,778 ft)

Population (2026-01-01)
  - Total: 143
  - Density: 38.1/km^{2} (98.8/sq mi)
- Time zone: UTC+1 (CET)
  - Summer (DST): UTC+2 (CEST)
- Postal code: 588 56
- Website: www.bohuslavice-ji.cz

Bohuslavice (Czech pronunciation: [ˈboɦuslavɪtsɛ]) is a municipality and village in Jihlava District in the Vysočina Region of the Czech Republic. It has about 100 inhabitants.

Bohuslavice lies approximately 28 kilometres (17 mi) south of Jihlava and 134 km (83 mi) south-east of Prague.

== Demographics ==
Historical population
Year	Pop.	±%
1869	233	—
1880	220	−5.6%
1890	219	−0.5%
1900	231	+5.5%
1910	243	+5.2%
1921	230	−5.3%
1930	215	−6.5%
1950	148	−31.2%
1961	121	−18.2%
1970	111	−8.3%
1980	103	−7.2%
1991	109	+5.8%
2001	125	+14.7%
2011	132	+5.6%
2021	118	−10.6%
Source: Censuses
