= Bohuslavice u Zlína =

- Municipality
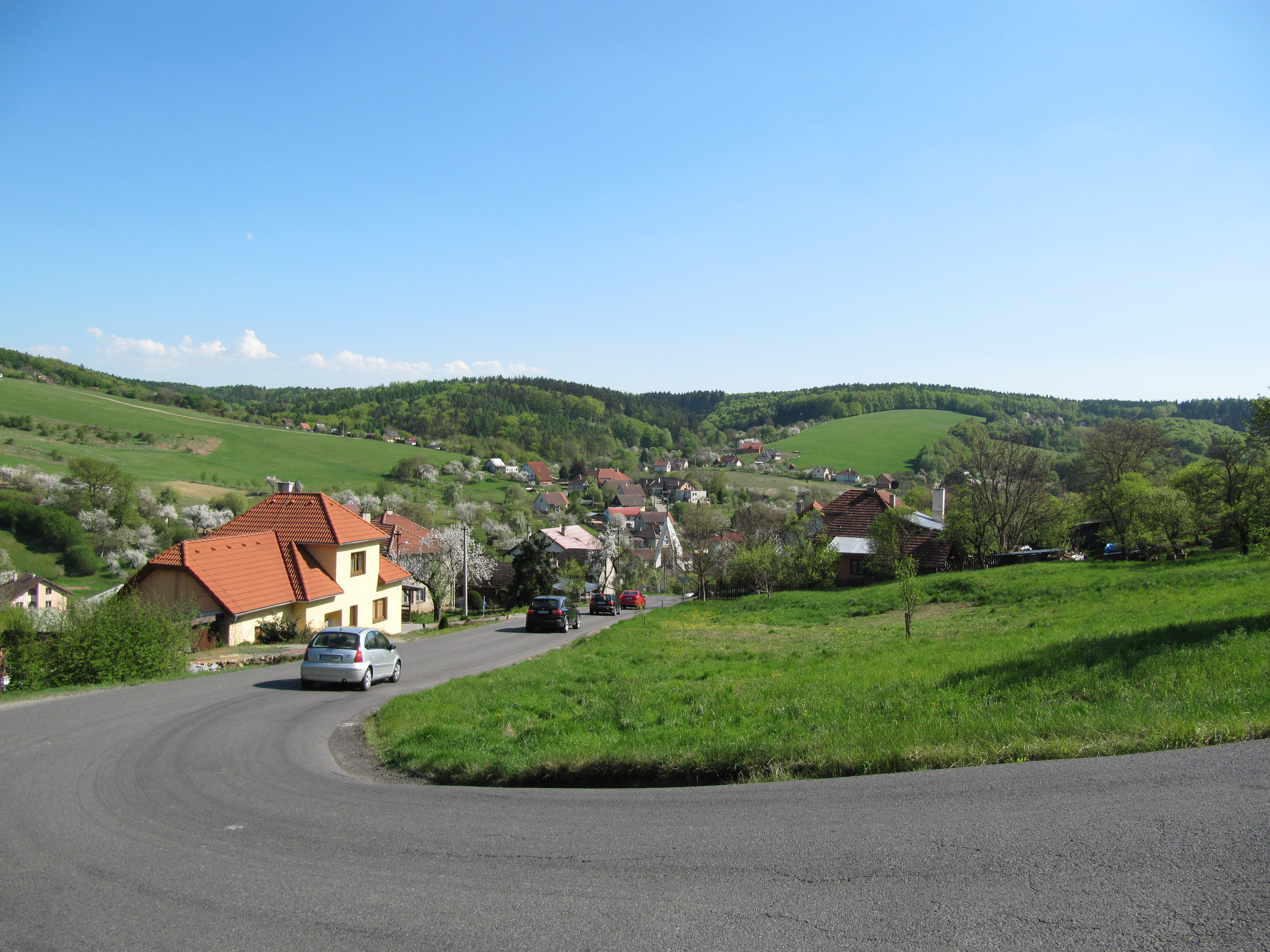
- View from the north

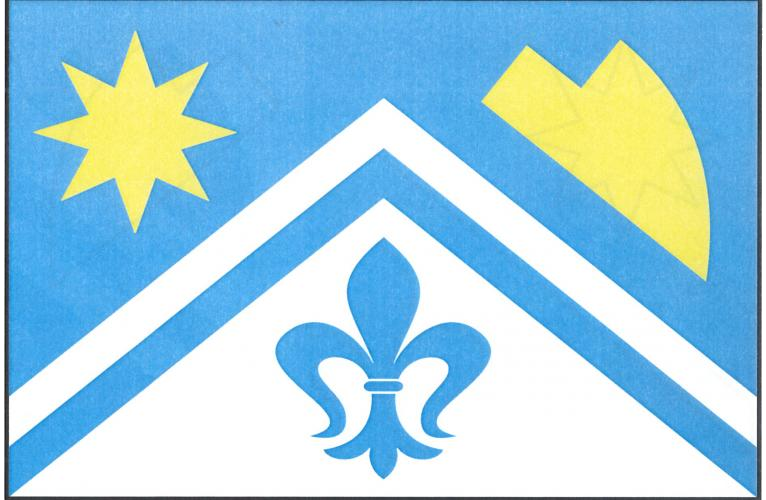
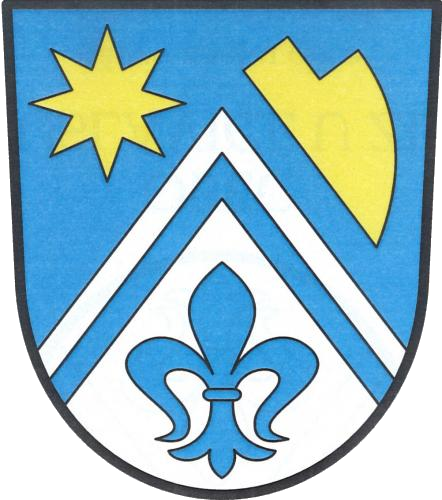
- Flag Coat of arms

- Location in the Czech Republic
- Coordinates: 49°9′47″N 17°38′12″E
- Country: Czech Republic
- Region: Zlín
- District: Zlín
- First mentioned: 1362

Area
  - Total: 8.05 km^{2} (3.11 sq mi)
- Elevation: 257 m (843 ft)

Population (2026-01-01)
  - Total: 734
  - Density: 91.2/km^{2} (236/sq mi)
- Time zone: UTC+1 (CET)
  - Summer (DST): UTC+2 (CEST)
- Postal code: 763 51
- Website: www.bohuslaviceuzlina.cz

Bohuslavice u Zlína is a municipality and village in Zlín District in the Zlín Region of the Czech Republic. It has about 700 inhabitants.

Bohuslavice u Zlína lies approximately 9 kilometres (6 mi) south of Zlín and 254 km (158 mi) south-east of Prague.

== Demographics ==
Historical population
Year	Pop.	±%
1869	541	—
1880	627	+15.9%
1890	599	−4.5%
1900	648	+8.2%
1910	643	−0.8%
1921	702	+9.2%
1930	724	+3.1%
1950	721	−0.4%
1961	793	+10.0%
1970	782	−1.4%
1980	840	+7.4%
1991	793	−5.6%
2001	800	+0.9%
2011	776	−3.0%
2021	748	−3.6%
Source: Censuses
