= Drnovice (Blansko District) =

- Municipality
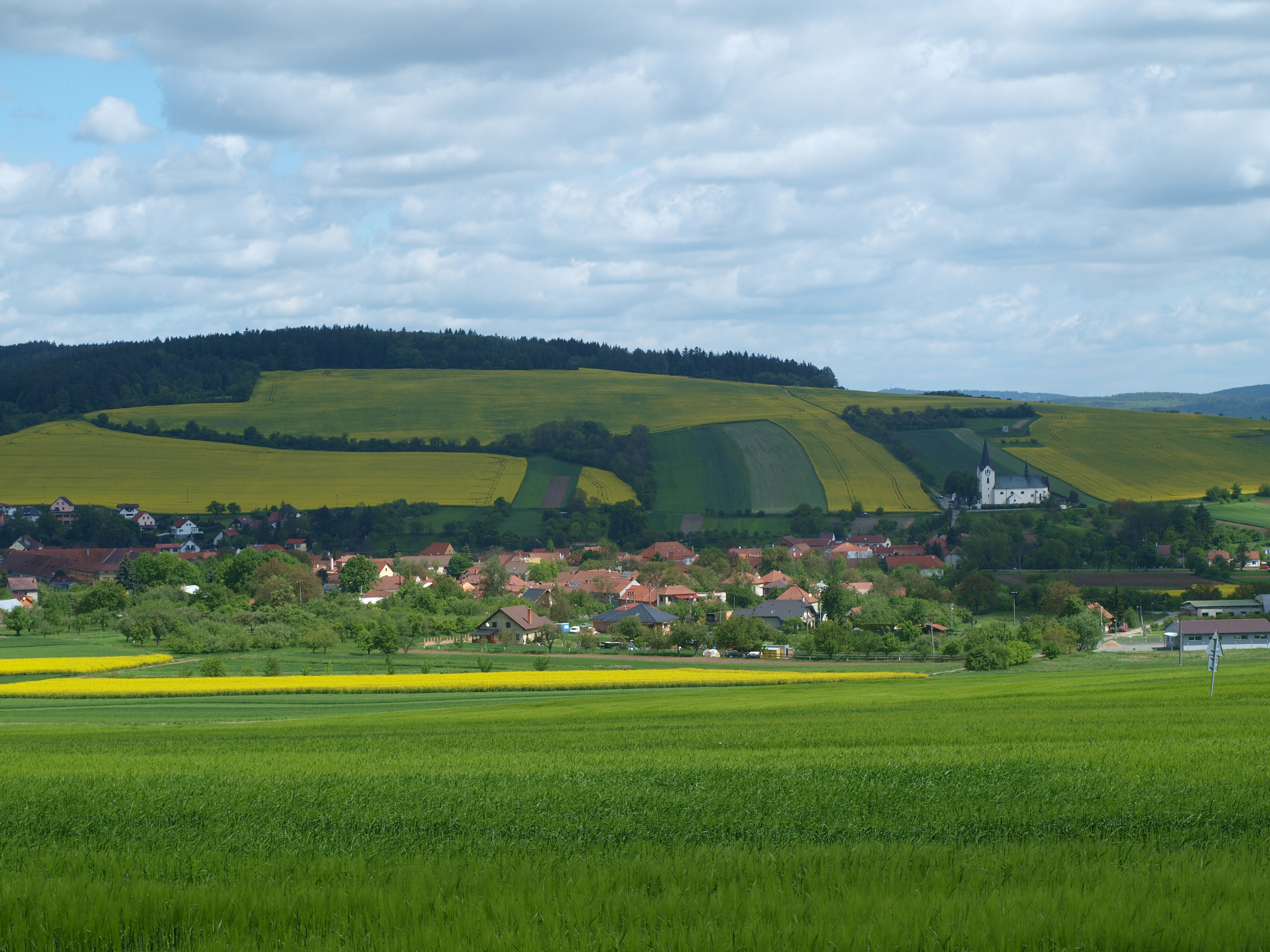
- View from the south

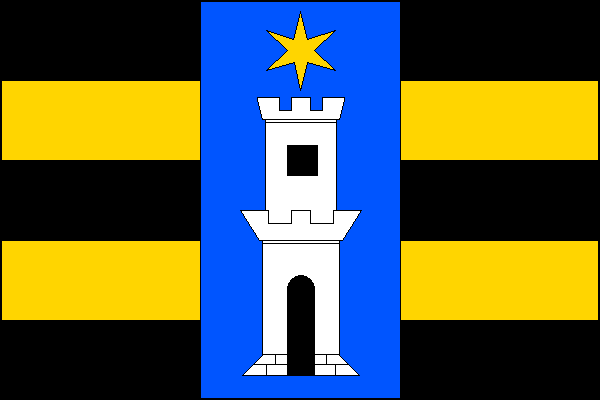
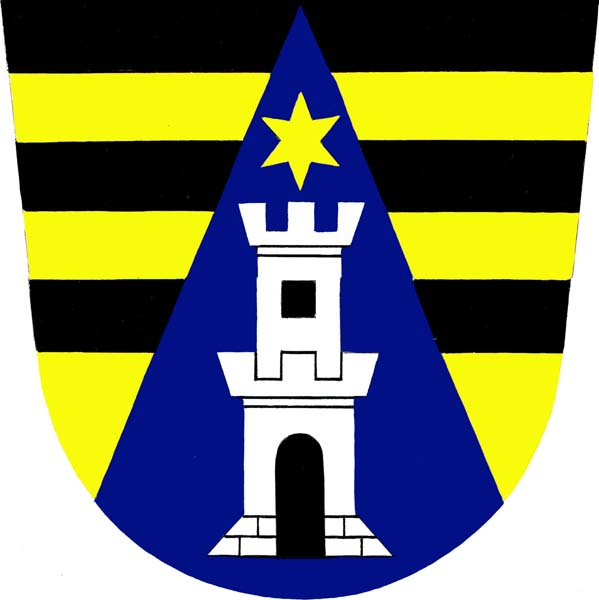
- Flag Coat of arms

- Location in the Czech Republic
- Coordinates: 49°28′10″N 16°32′32″E
- Country: Czech Republic
- Region: South Moravian
- District: Blansko
- First mentioned: 1249

Area
  - Total: 8.00 km^{2} (3.09 sq mi)
- Elevation: 351 m (1,152 ft)

Population (2026-01-01)
  - Total: 1,395
  - Density: 174/km^{2} (452/sq mi)
- Time zone: UTC+1 (CET)
  - Summer (DST): UTC+2 (CEST)
- Postal code: 679 76
- Website: www.drnovice.cz

Drnovice is a municipality and village in Blansko District in the South Moravian Region of the Czech Republic. It has about 1,400 inhabitants.

Drnovice lies approximately 15 kilometres (9 mi) north-west of Blansko, 31 km (19 mi) north of Brno, and 167 km (104 mi) south-east of Prague.

== Demographics ==
Historical population
Year	Pop.	±%
1869	748	—
1880	776	+3.7%
1890	759	−2.2%
1900	782	+3.0%
1910	801	+2.4%
1921	824	+2.9%
1930	876	+6.3%
1950	858	−2.1%
1961	921	+7.3%
1970	951	+3.3%
1980	1,048	+10.2%
1991	1,082	+3.2%
2001	1,123	+3.8%
2011	1,207	+7.5%
2021	1,321	+9.4%
Source: Censuses
