= Bohuslavice nad Vláří =

- Municipality
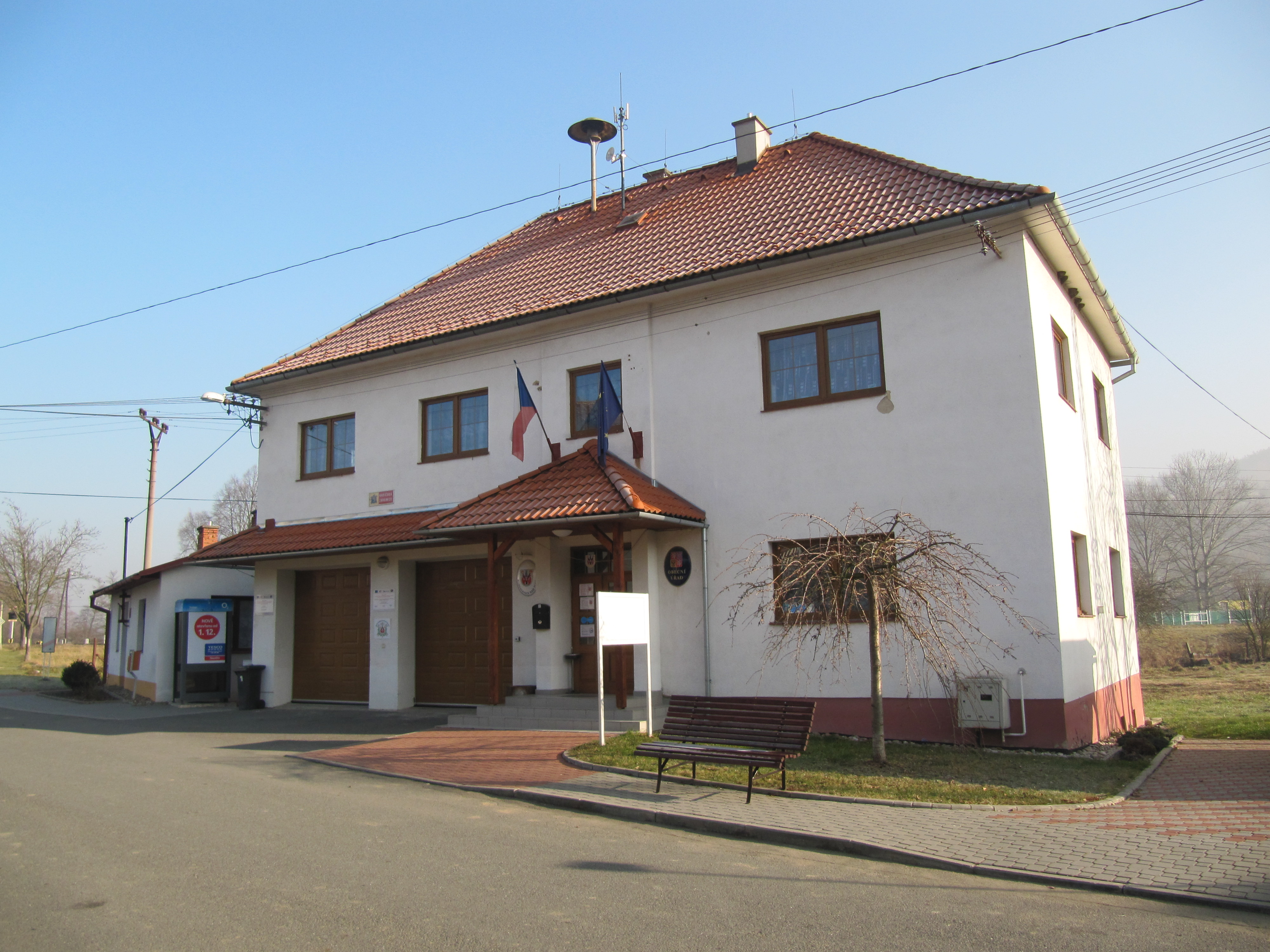
- Municipal office

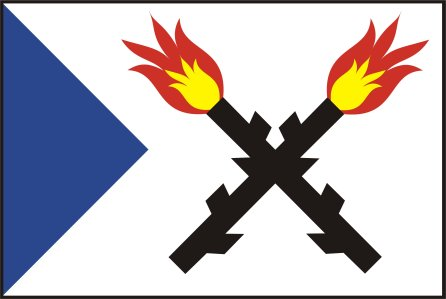
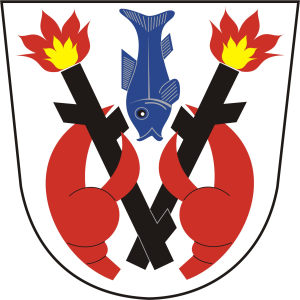
- Flag Coat of arms

- Location in the Czech Republic
- Coordinates: 49°5′25″N 17°55′35″E
- Country: Czech Republic
- Region: Zlín
- District: Zlín
- First mentioned: 1365

Area
  - Total: 6.85 km^{2} (2.64 sq mi)
- Elevation: 338 m (1,109 ft)

Population (2026-01-01)
  - Total: 349
  - Density: 50.9/km^{2} (132/sq mi)
- Time zone: UTC+1 (CET)
  - Summer (DST): UTC+2 (CEST)
- Postal code: 763 21
- Website: www.bohuslavicenadvlari.cz

Bohuslavice nad Vláří is a municipality and village in Zlín District in the Zlín Region of the Czech Republic. It has about 300 inhabitants.

Bohuslavice nad Vláří lies approximately 26 kilometres (16 mi) south-east of Zlín and 277 km (172 mi) south-east of Prague.

== Demographics ==
Historical population
Year	Pop.	±%
1869	568	—
1880	523	−7.9%
1890	549	+5.0%
1900	570	+3.8%
1910	569	−0.2%
1921	566	−0.5%
1930	528	−6.7%
1950	515	−2.5%
1961	526	+2.1%
1970	520	−1.1%
1980	428	−17.7%
1991	398	−7.0%
2001	402	+1.0%
2011	394	−2.0%
2021	362	−8.1%
Source: Censuses
