= Brumov-Bylnice =

- Town
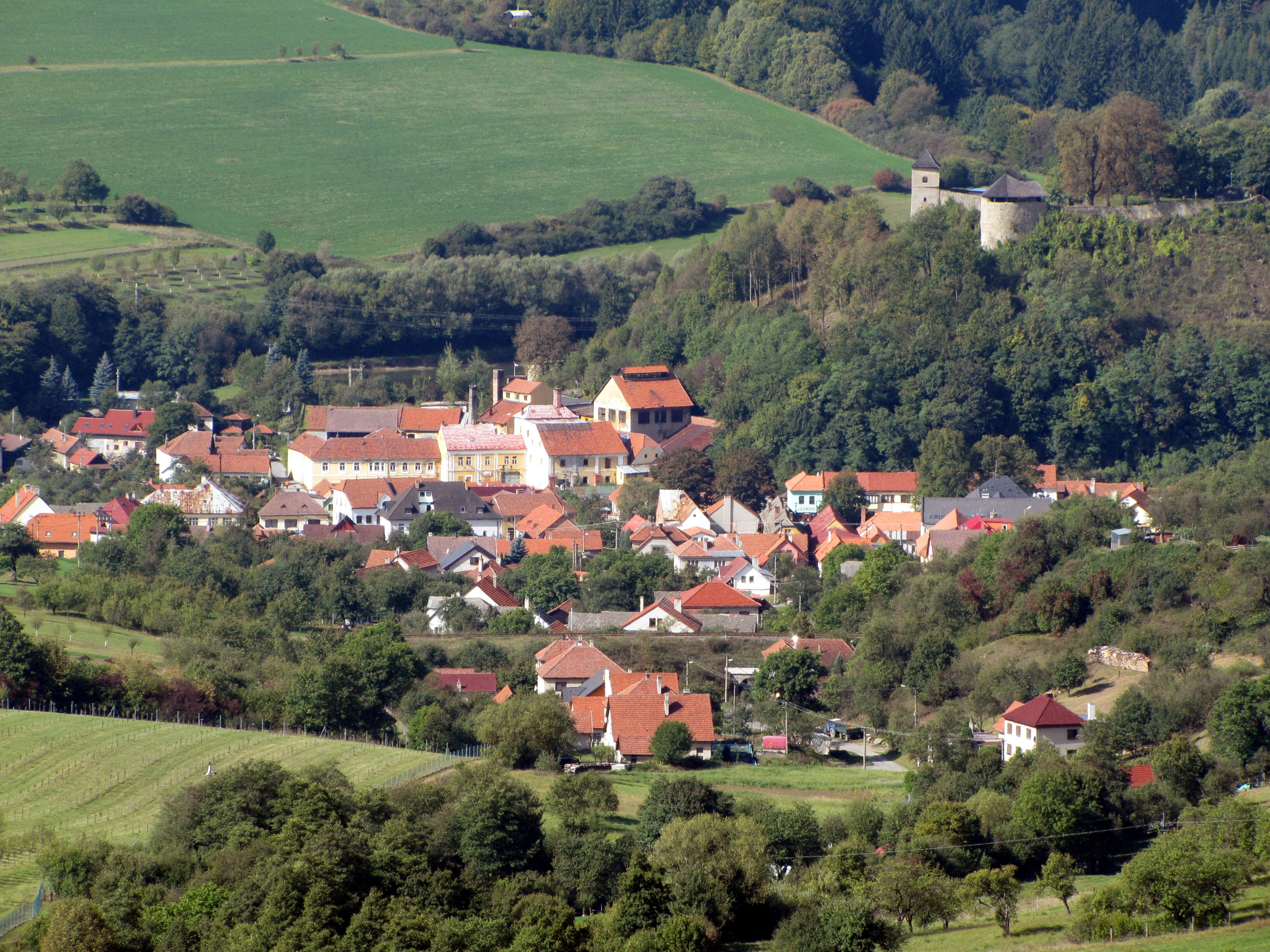
- Brumov-Bylnice with the Brumov Castle

- Flag Coat of arms

- Location in the Czech Republic
- Coordinates: 49°4′55″N 18°1′17″E
- Country: Czech Republic
- Region: Zlín
- District: Zlín
- First mentioned: 1255

Government
  - Mayor: František Jedlička (KDU-ČSL)

Area
  - Total: 56.27 km^{2} (21.73 sq mi)
- Elevation: 330 m (1,080 ft)

Population (2026-01-01)
  - Total: 5,372
  - Density: 95.47/km^{2} (247.3/sq mi)
- Time zone: UTC+1 (CET)
  - Summer (DST): UTC+2 (CEST)
- Postal code: 763 31
- Website: www.brumov-bylnice.cz

Brumov-Bylnice (Czech pronunciation: [ˈbrumof ˈbɪlɲɪtsɛ]) is a town in Zlín District in the Zlín Region of the Czech Republic. It has about 5,400 inhabitants. The town is located in the White Carpathians mountain range, on the border with Slovakia.

Brumov and Bylnice merged into one municipality in 1964 and obtained the town status in the same year. The historic centre of Brumov and the workers' colony in Brumov are well preserved and are protected as two urban monument zones.

== Administrative division ==
Brumov-Bylnice consists of four municipal parts (in brackets population according to the 2021 census):

- Brumov (2,877)
- Bylnice (1,802)
- Sidonie (236)
- Svatý Štěpán (276)

== Geography ==
Brumov-Bylnice is located 30 kilometres (19 mi) southeast of Zlín, on the border with Slovakia. The urban area of Brumov-Bylnice lies about 5 kilometres (3 mi) from the border.

Brumov-Bylnice is situated in the White Carpathians mountain range and in the Bílé Karpaty Protected Landscape Area. The highest point is the mountain Průklesy at 836 m (2,743 ft) above sea level. The Vlára River flows through the southern part of the municipal territory. The Brumovka Stream flows through the town proper before it joins the Vlára. The place where the Vlára leaves the Czech Republic is known as Vlára Pass.

== History ==
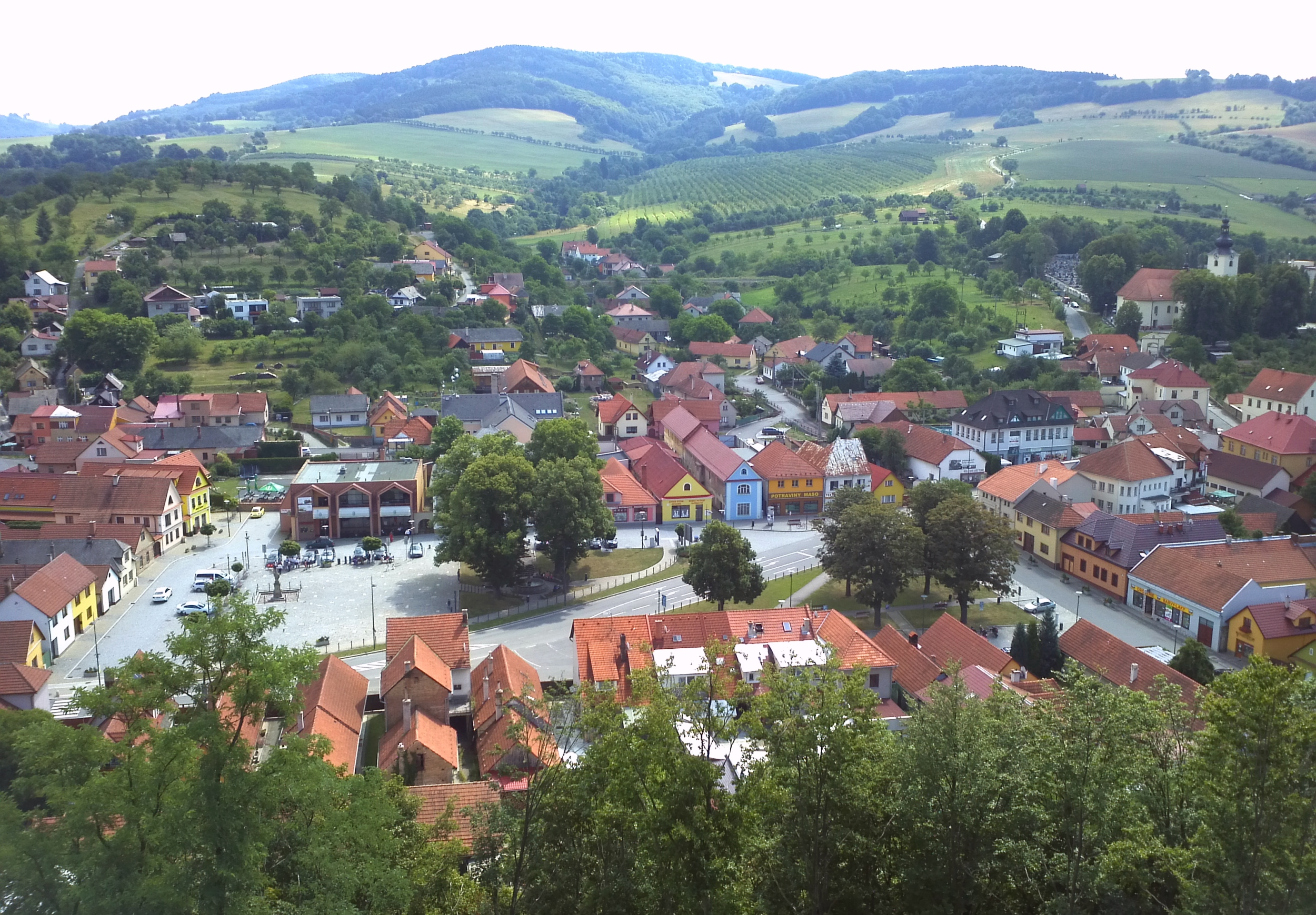
Centre of Brumov

In around 1225, a late Romanesque royal castle was built in Brumov, one of the oldest in Moravia. The first written mention of Brumov is from 1255. The castle and the village were owned by Olřich of Hradec at the turn of the 13th and 14th centuries, and by Boček of Kunštát in the early 15th century. After the Hussite Wars, the castle became a royal property again. In the 15th century, Brumov ofter changed its owners and was used for marauding raids into the surrounding area and especially into Hungary.

The village of Bylnice was first mentioned in 1424 as a part of the Brumov estate and shared history and owners with it. In 1503, Brumov was first referred to as a town. In the early 16th century, Brumov was acquired by the lords of Lomnice who rebuilt the castle and made it the main seat of their Moravian properties. During their rule Brumov prospered. They sold Brumov to Zdeněk Kavka of Říčany in 1574.

In the 17th century, Brumov and Bylnice suffered from invasions of raiders because these were the first settlements that the enemy encountered on the way from Hungary. After the invasion of the Turks and Tatars in 1663, Brumov was burned and almost destroyed. In 1683, Brumov was looted and devastated by rebels under the lead of Emeric Thököly and again in 1704 under the lead of Francis II Rákóczi. As a result, Brumov lost its significance.

During the 18th and 19th centuries, both Brumov and Bylnice recovered, but prosperity was hampered by fires and cholera epidemics. The railway to Bylnice was built in 1887 and became an important factor in the development of the area. The railway was constructed in Brumov in 1928.

On 1 July 1964, the two municipalities Brumov and Bylnice were merged to form Brumov-Bylnice, and the new municipality gained the status of a town. Since 1976, the villages of Svatý Štěpán and Sidonie were joined to the town. In 1997, the Czech–Slovak border was changed and part of the hitherto Slovak territory was annexed to Brumov-Bylnice.

== Demographics ==
Historical population

| Year | Pop. | ±% |
|---|---|---|
| 1869 | 3,495 | — |
| 1880 | 3,607 | +3.2% |
| 1890 | 3,297 | −8.6% |
| 1900 | 3,844 | +16.6% |
| 1910 | 4,009 | +4.3% |

| Year | Pop. | ±% |
|---|---|---|
| 1921 | 3,824 | −4.6% |
| 1930 | 4,394 | +14.9% |
| 1950 | 4,505 | +2.5% |
| 1961 | 5,225 | +16.0% |
| 1970 | 5,532 | +5.9% |

| Year | Pop. | ±% |
|---|---|---|
| 1980 | 5,795 | +4.8% |
| 1991 | 5,924 | +2.2% |
| 2001 | 6,091 | +2.8% |
| 2011 | 5,602 | −8.0% |
| 2021 | 5,191 | −7.3% |

Source: Censuses

== Transport ==
The road border crossing Brumov-Bylnice / Horné Srnie is located in the territory of Brumov-Bylnice. The I/57 road (from the Czech–Slovak border to Vsetín and further continuing to Opava) runs through the town.

There are three train stations in the municipal territory: Bylnice, Brumov, Brumov střed and also Návojná, which serves the neighbouring municipality of Návojná. Bylnice is the terminus and starting point of the railway lines to Vsetín (via Brumov) and to Bojkovice.

== Sights ==
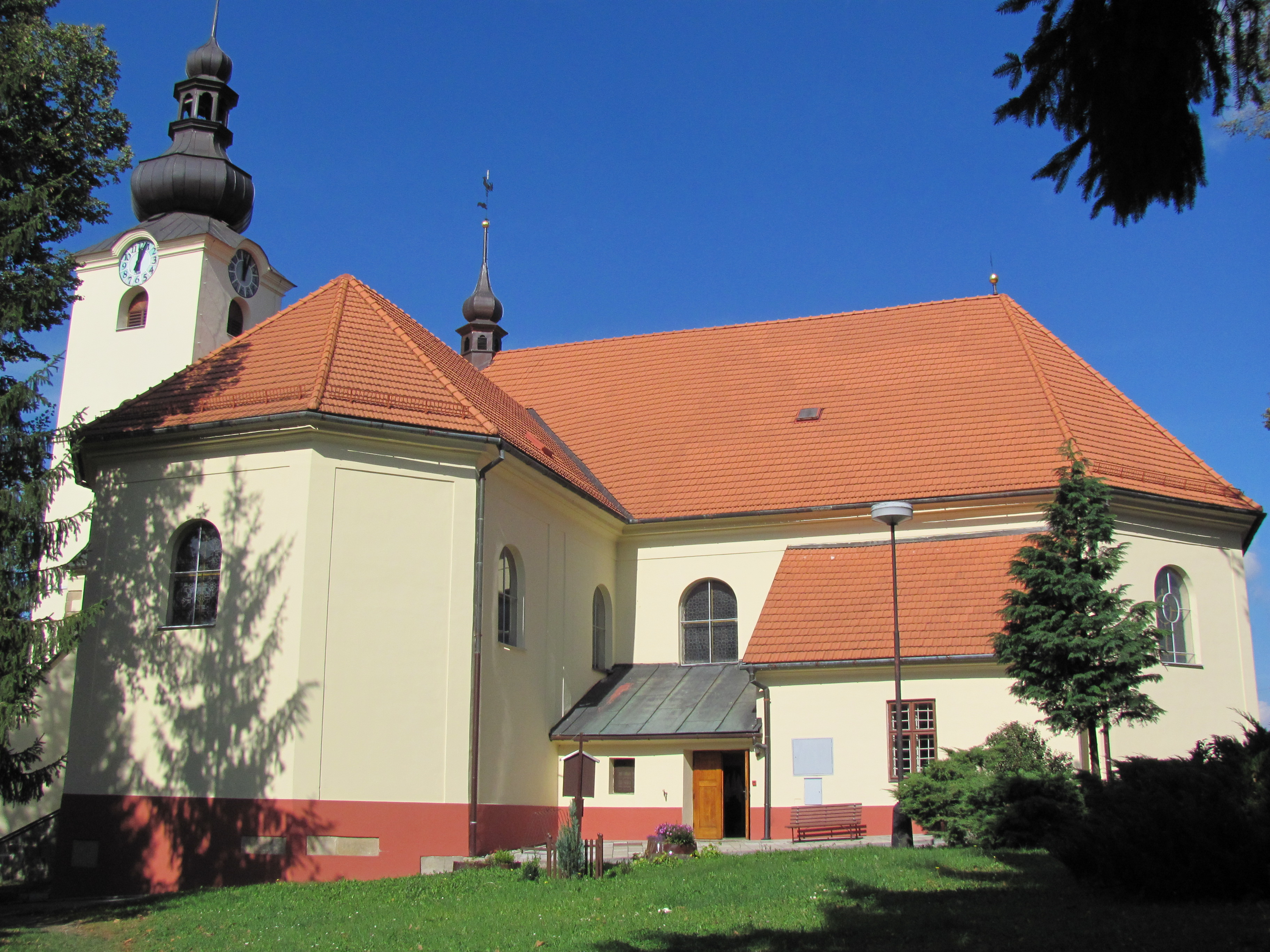
Church of Saint Wenceslaus in Brumov

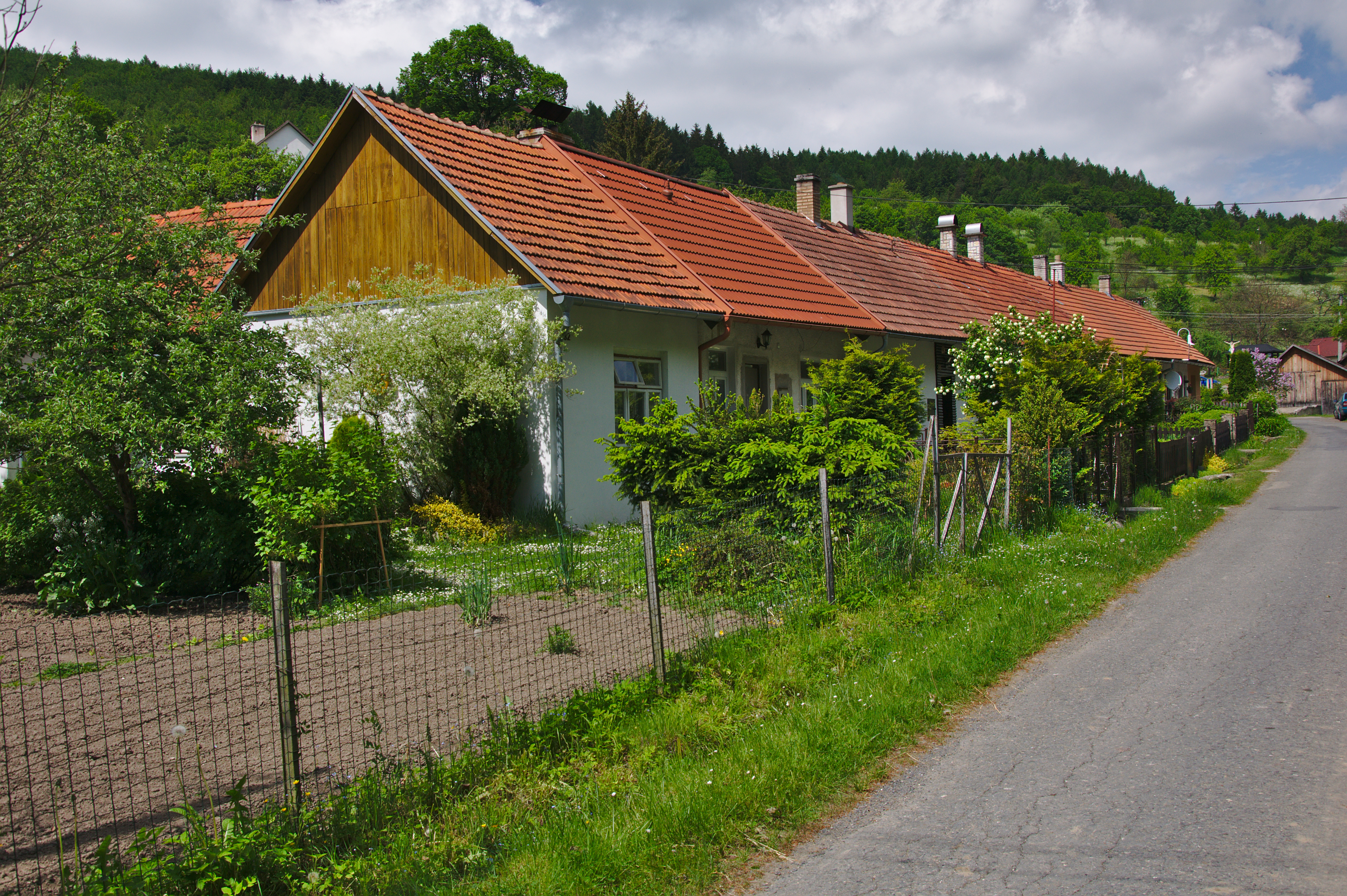
Sidonie workers' colony

The historic centre of Brumov is protected as an urban monument zone. The ruin of the royal Brumov Castle is the most significant monument Brumov-Bylnice and one of the most important historic monuments in the region. It was one of the most important castles in Moravia. The castle was damaged by a fire in 1760 and abandoned after 1826.

The Church of Saint Wenceslaus in Brumov probably existed already in the late 13th or early 14th century. The parish church was completely rebuilt in 1511 and the tower was added. In 1834, it was rebuilt into its current form. The valuable bell is from 1671.

The Baroque sculptural group of the Holy Trinity on the square is from 1777. Other sculptures in the town are saints John of Nepomuk (created in 1730), Florian (created in 1755), and Gotthard (created in 1771).

The Jewish cemetery on the outskirts of the town is the only one in the territory of Zlín District. Existence of the cemetery is first documented in 1758.

On the outskirts of Brumov is a former workers' colony, protected as an urban monument zone. It consists of a set of semi-detached houses built during World War II for German police officers.

The workers' colony in Sidonie documents the standard of living of the glass workers from the end of the 19th and the beginning of the 20th century. However, this unique and historically rare set of former workers' dwellings is today altered by different adjustments of the owners of individual houses. The whole block is covered with a gabled roof with wooden dormers.

== Notable people ==
- Ludvík Vaculík (1926–2015), writer and journalist
- Tomáš Řepka (born 1974), footballer

== Gallery ==
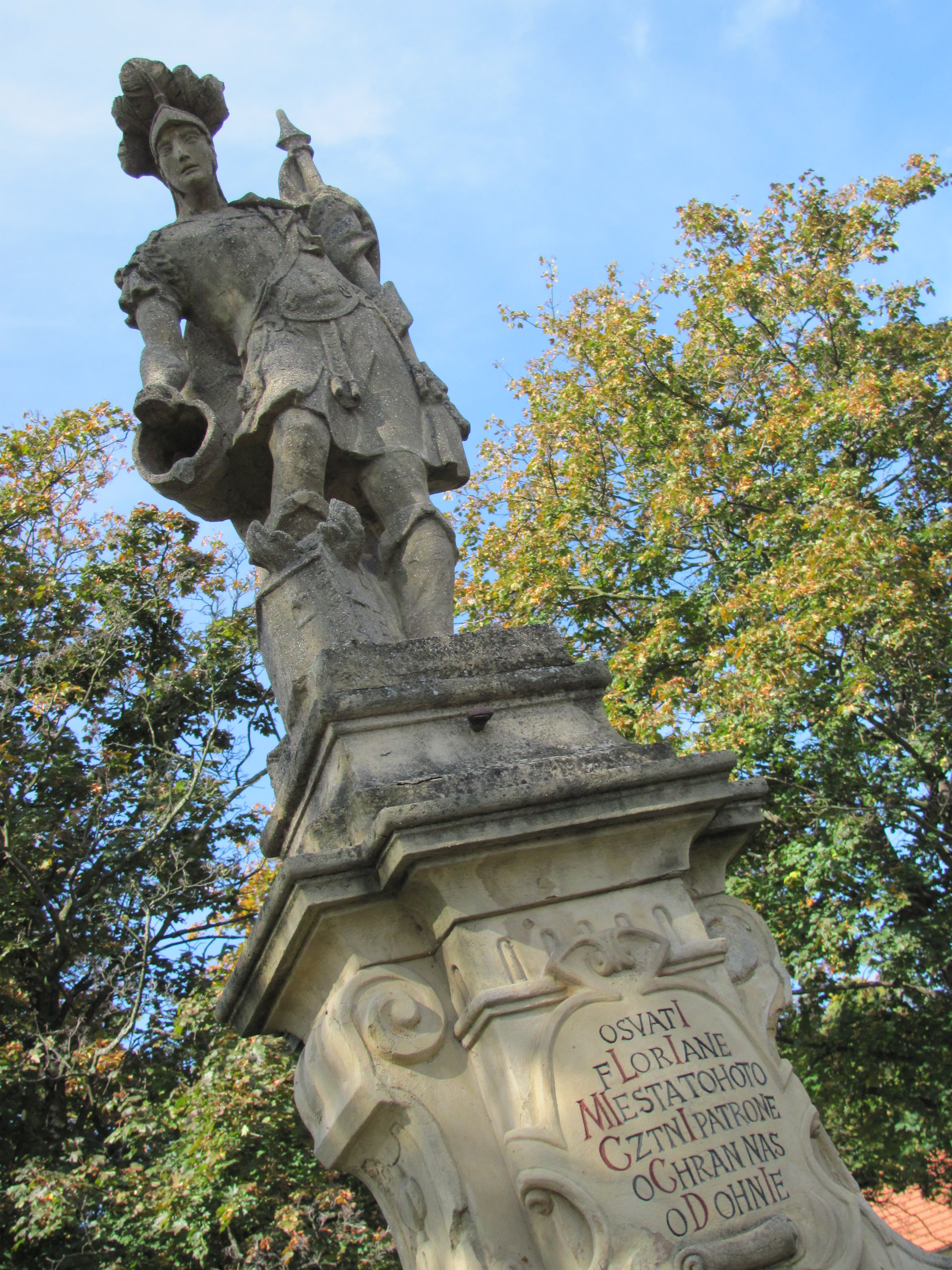
Statue of Saint Florian

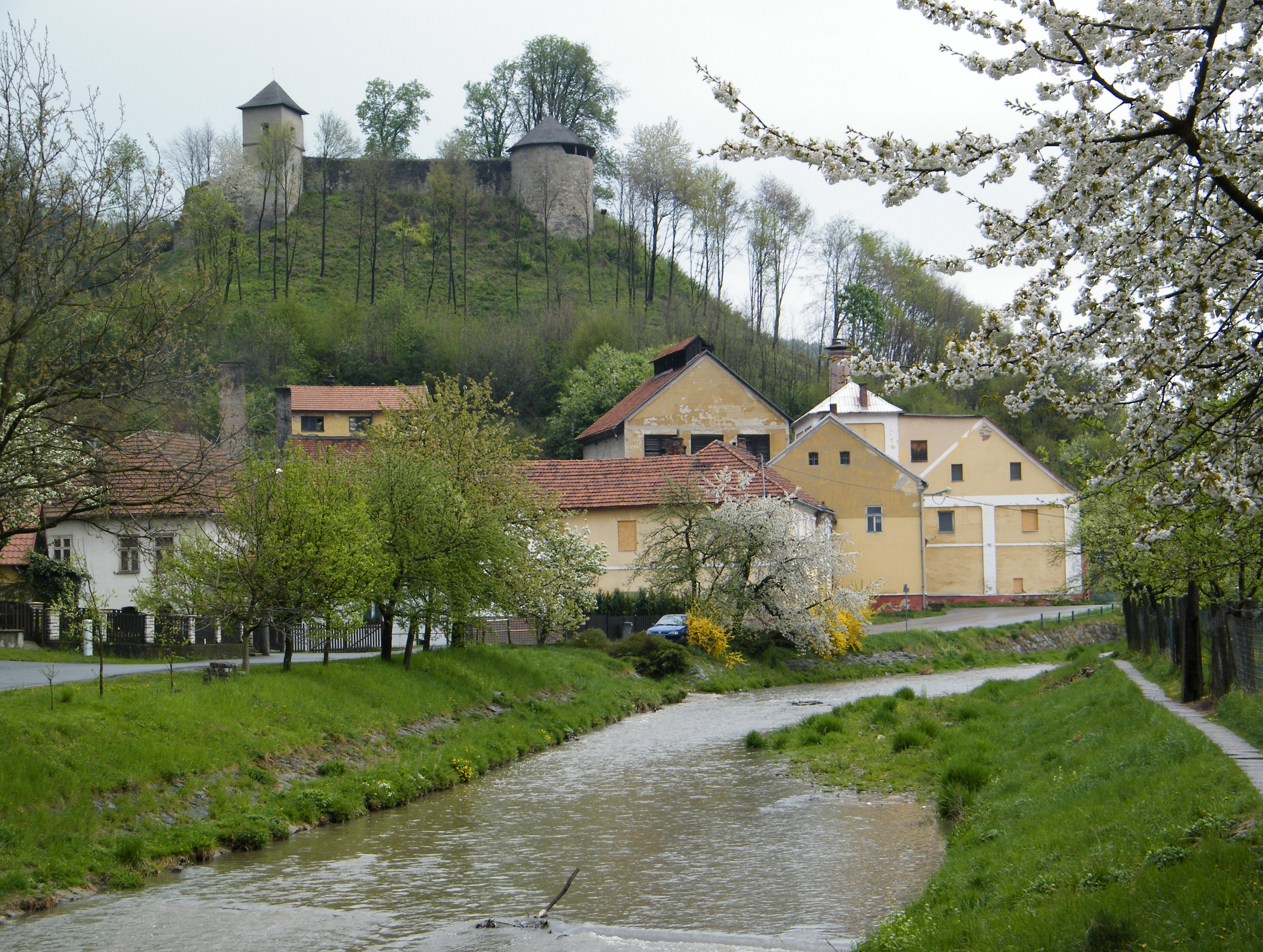
View of Brumov Castle

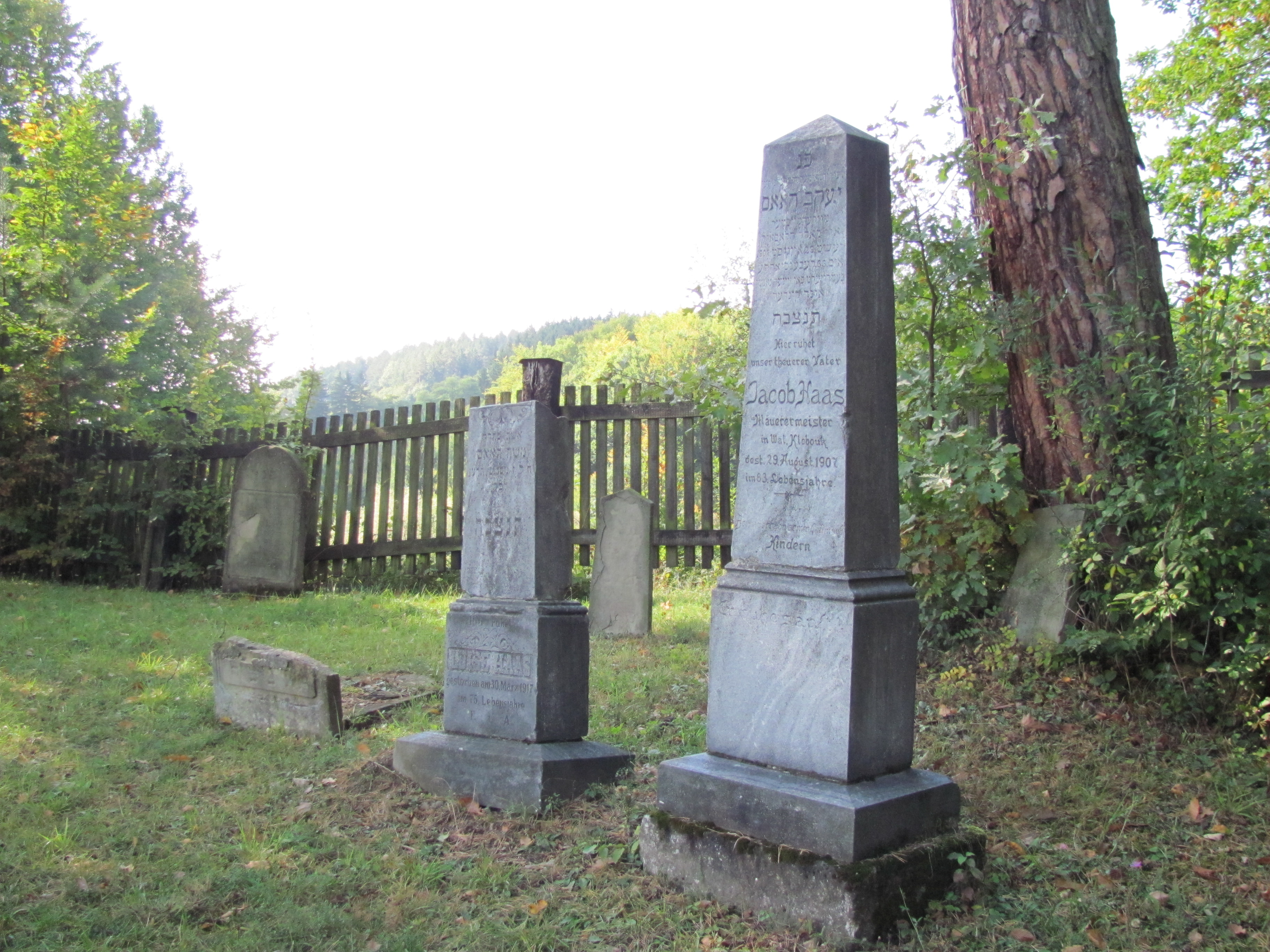
Jewish cemetery
