= Kaňovice =

Kaňovice may refer to places in the Czech Republic:

- Kaňovice (Frýdek-Místek District), a municipality and village in the Moravian-Silesian Region
- Kaňovice (Zlín District), a municipality and village in the Zlín Region
