= Kaňovice (Zlín District) =

- Municipality
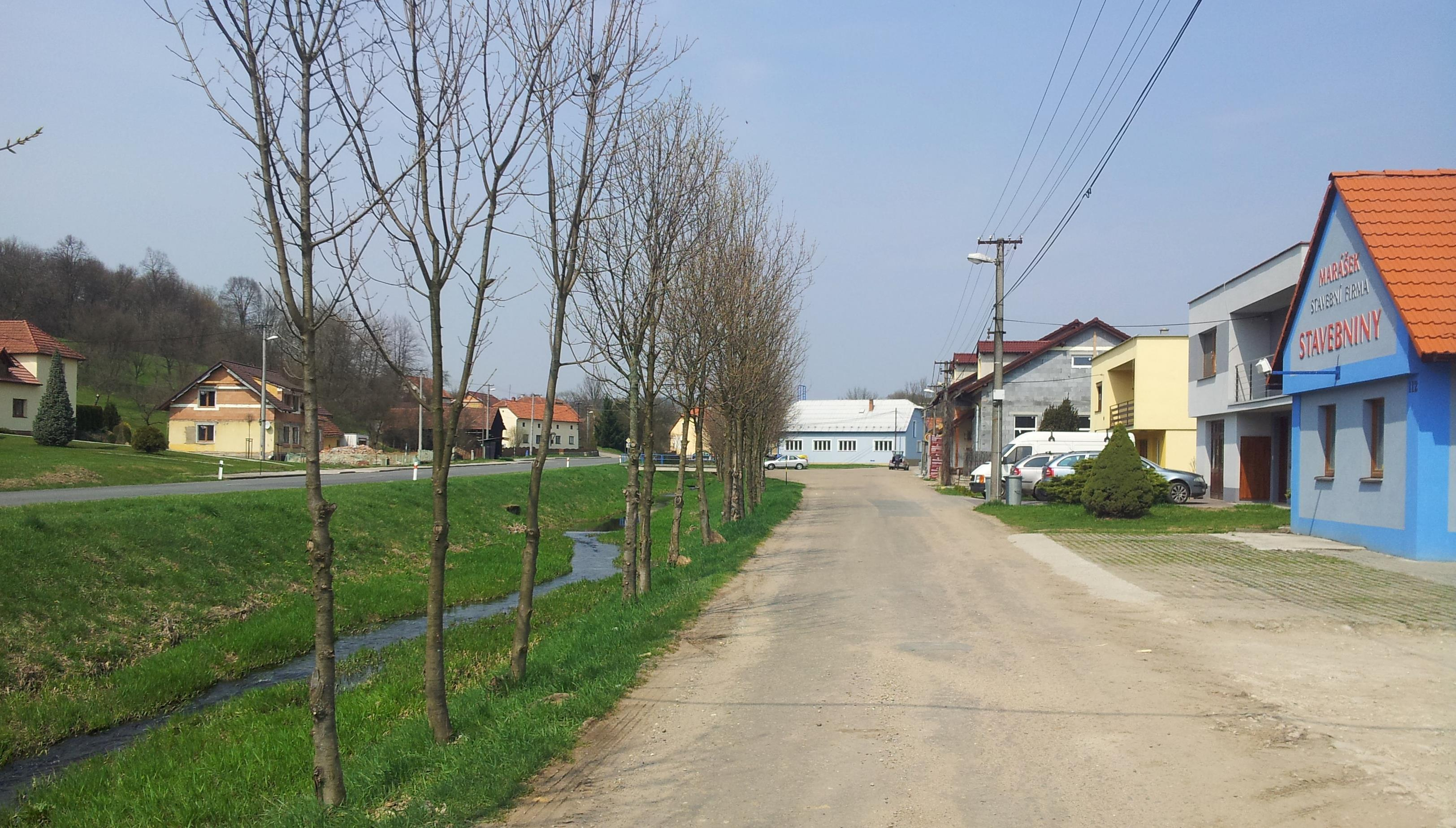
- A street along the stream Černý potok

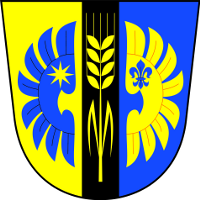
- Flag Coat of arms

- Location in the Czech Republic
- Coordinates: 49°6′33″N 17°41′56″E
- Country: Czech Republic
- Region: Zlín
- District: Zlín
- First mentioned: 1362

Area
  - Total: 4.61 km^{2} (1.78 sq mi)
- Elevation: 260 m (850 ft)

Population (2026-01-01)
  - Total: 302
  - Density: 65.5/km^{2} (170/sq mi)
- Time zone: UTC+1 (CET)
  - Summer (DST): UTC+2 (CEST)
- Postal code: 763 41
- Website: www.kanovice.cz

Kaňovice is a municipality and village in Zlín District in the Zlín Region of the Czech Republic. It has about 300 inhabitants.

Kaňovice lies approximately 15 kilometres (9 mi) south of Zlín and 261 km (162 mi) south-east of Prague.

== Demographics ==
Historical population
Year	Pop.	±%
1869	198	—
1880	229	+15.7%
1890	224	−2.2%
1900	238	+6.2%
1910	275	+15.5%
1921	253	−8.0%
1930	271	+7.1%
1950	315	+16.2%
1961	346	+9.8%
1970	332	−4.0%
1980	316	−4.8%
1991	269	−14.9%
2001	273	+1.5%
2011	264	−3.3%
2021	261	−1.1%
Source: Censuses
