= Moštěnka =

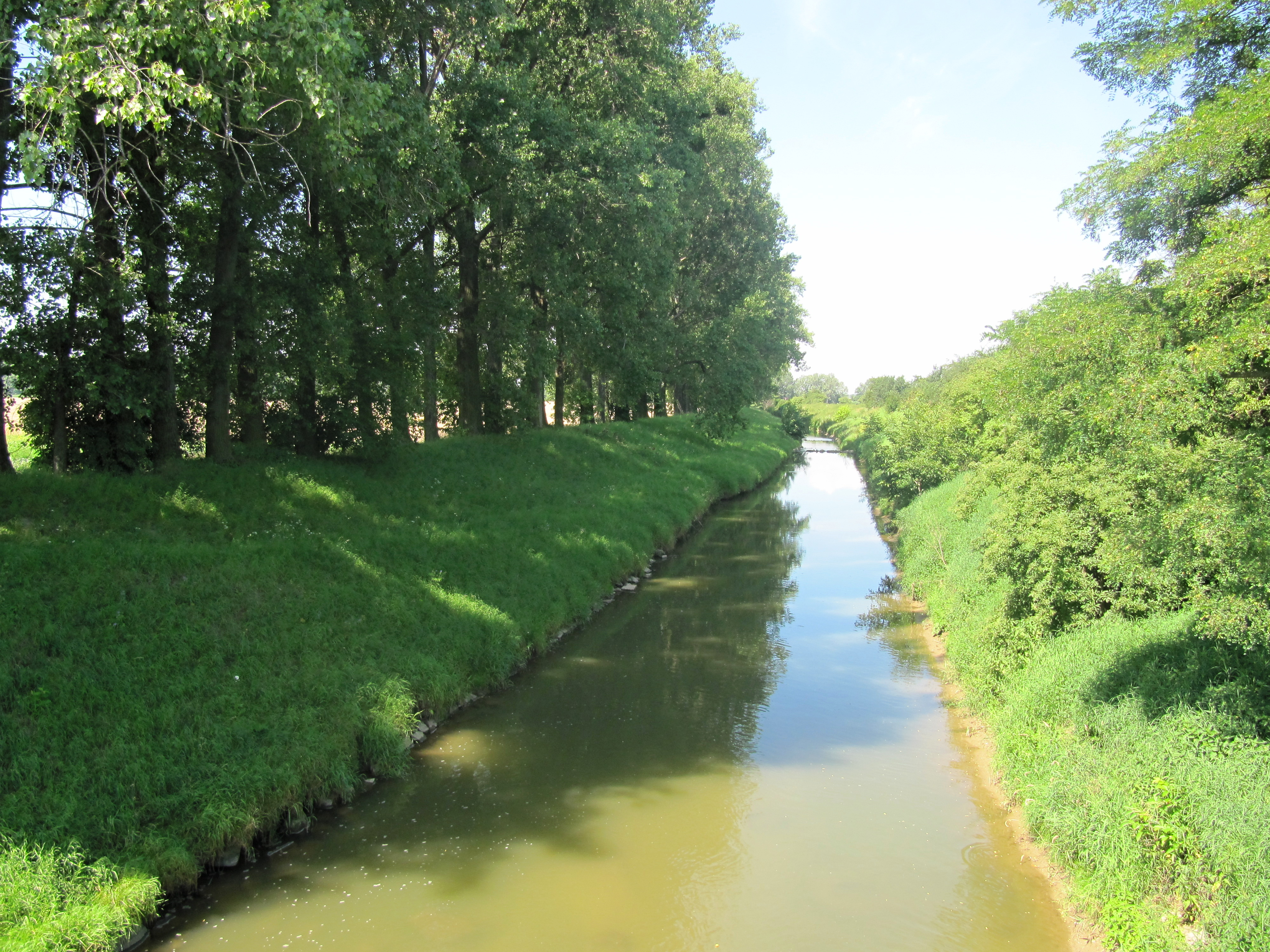
- The Moštěnka in Žalkovice

Location
- Country: Czech Republic
- Regions: Zlín; Olomouc

Physical characteristics
- Source
  - location: Loukov, Hostýn-Vsetín Mountains
  - coordinates: 49°23′48″N 17°45′24″E
  - elevation: 775 m (2,543 ft)
- Mouth
  - location: Morava
  - coordinates: 49°19′3″N 17°23′8″E
  - elevation: 189 m (620 ft)
- Length: 45.6 km (28.3 mi)
- Basin size: 354.6 km^{2} (136.9 sq mi)
- Discharge
  - average: 1.29 m^{3}/s (46 cu ft/s) near estuary

Basin features
- Progression: Morava→ Danube→ Black Sea

The Moštěnka is a river in the Czech Republic, a left tributary of the Morava River. It flows through the Zlín and Olomouc regions. It is 45.6 km (28.3 mi) long.

== Etymology ==
The name is derived from the village of Horní Moštěnice. The river also used to be called Stvola after a willow-trees species (stvola in Old Slavic).

== Characteristic ==
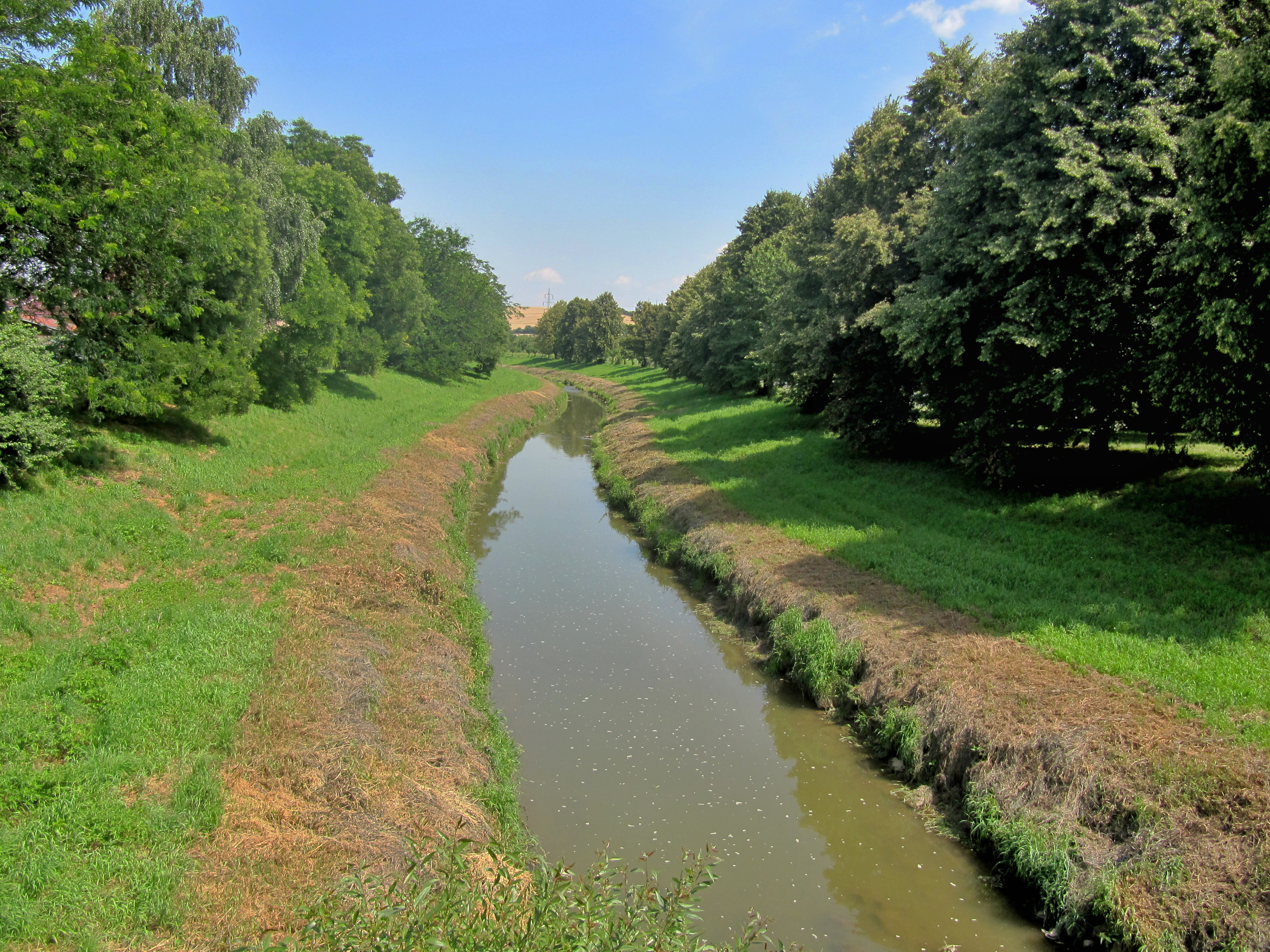
The Moštěnka in Horní Moštěnice

The Moštěnka originates in the territory of Loukov in the Hostýn-Vsetín Mountains at an elevation of 775 m (2,543 ft) and flows to Kroměříž, where it enters the Morava River at an elevation of 189 m (620 ft). It is 45.6 km (28.3 mi) long. Its drainage basin has an area of 354.6 km^{2} (136.9 sq mi). The average discharge at its mouth is 1.29 m^{3}/s (46 cu ft/s).

The longest tributaries of the Moštěnka are:

Tributary	Length (km)	Side
Bystřička	17.9	left
Dolnonětčický potok	15.1	right
Kozrálka	15.1	left
Šišemka	13.7	right
Blažický potok	11.9	left

In addition to its tributaries, the Moštěnka also receives water from the Bečva River through the Malá Bečva canal. It was built to power the water mill in Chropyně, to operate irrigation systems and to supply water reservoirs. It is 20.1 km (12.5 mi) long and joins the Moštěnka shortly before its confluence with the Morava.

== Course ==
The river flows through the municipal territories of Loukov, Osíčko, Horní Újezd, Vítonice, Žákovice, Blazice, Radkova Lhota, Radkovy, Dřevohostice, Turovice, Domaželice, Čechy, Beňov, Horní Moštěnice, Říkovice, Žalkovice, Břest, Skaštice, Chropyně and Kroměříž.

== Bodies of water ==
There are 152 bodies of water in the basin area. The largest of them is the fishpond Zámecký rybník with an area of 18.9 ha (47 acres), supplied by the Malá Bečva. There are no reservoirs or fishponds built directly on the Moštěnka.

== Fauna ==
The middle course of the Moštěnka is home to the European bitterling, which is an endangered species of fish within the Czech Republic.

== See also ==
- List of rivers of the Czech Republic
