= Žalkovice =

- Municipality
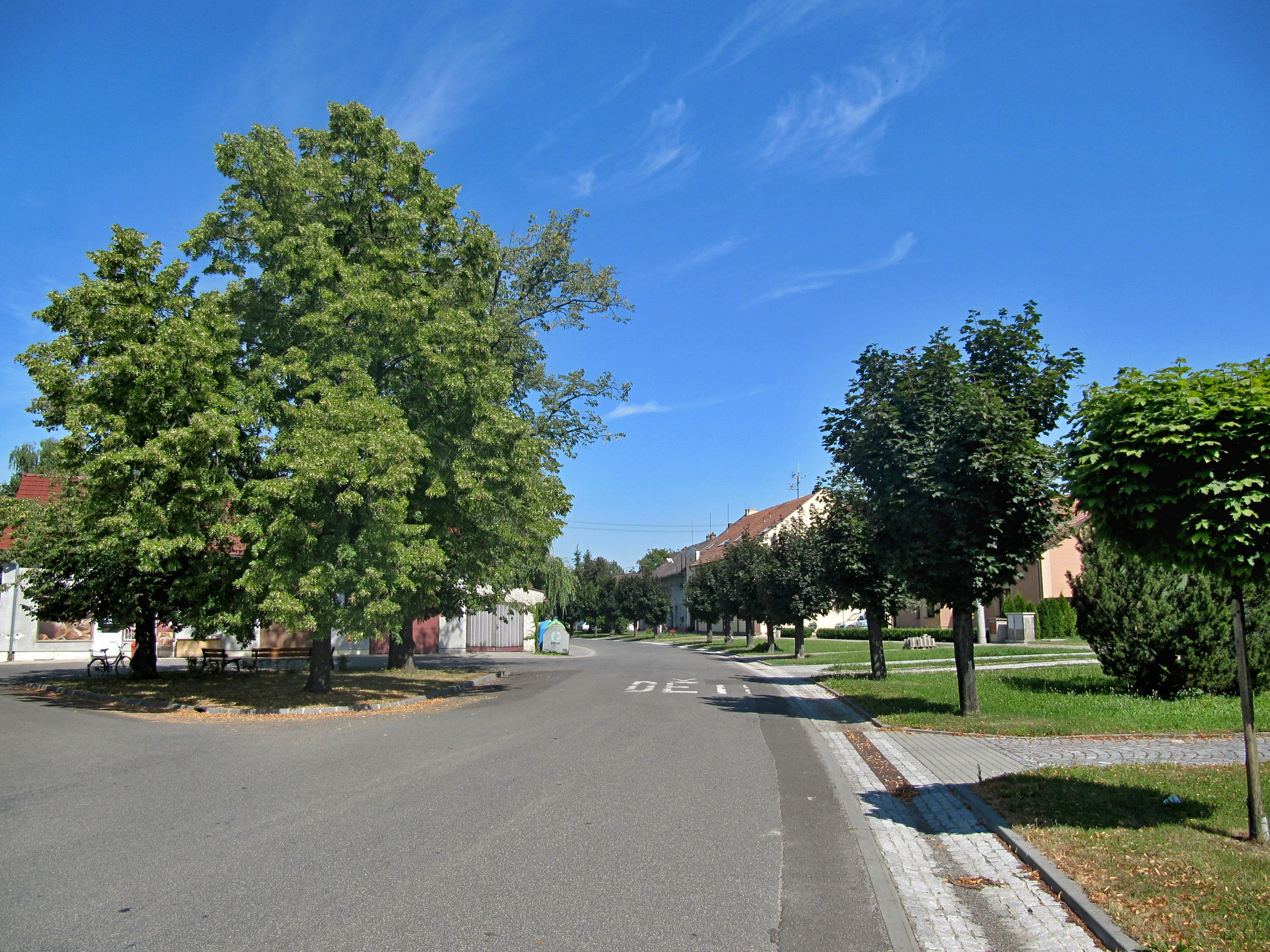
- Centre of Žalkovice

- Flag Coat of arms

- Location in the Czech Republic
- Coordinates: 49°22′19″N 17°26′9″E
- Country: Czech Republic
- Region: Zlín
- District: Kroměříž
- First mentioned: 1221

Area
  - Total: 6.81 km^{2} (2.63 sq mi)
- Elevation: 197 m (646 ft)

Population (2026-01-01)
  - Total: 587
  - Density: 86.2/km^{2} (223/sq mi)
- Time zone: UTC+1 (CET)
  - Summer (DST): UTC+2 (CEST)
- Postal code: 768 23
- Website: www.zalkovice.cz

Žalkovice is a municipality and village in Kroměříž District in the Zlín Region of the Czech Republic. It has about 600 inhabitants.

== Geography ==
Žalkovice is located about 9 kilometres (6 mi) north of Kroměříž and 23 km (14 mi) northwest of Zlín. It lies in a flat agricultural landscape in the Upper Morava Valley. The Moštěnka River flows through the municipality.

== History ==
The first written mention of Žalkovice is from 1221, when Moravian margrave Vladislaus III donated the village to the monastery in Velehrad. The monastery owned Žalkovice until 1397, then it was a property of various less important noblemen. In the mid-16th century, Žalkovice became part of the Chropyně estate. In 1615, the estate was bought by Cardinal Franz von Dietrichstein. From 1617 until the establishment of an independent municipality in 1848, Žalkovice and the entire estate was owned by the Olomouc bishopric.

== Demographics ==
Historical population

Year	Pop.	±%
1869	560	—
1880	663	+18.4%
1890	642	−3.2%
1900	636	−0.9%
1910	700	+10.1%

Year	Pop.	±%
1921	703	+0.4%
1930	674	−4.1%
1950	634	−5.9%
1961	594	−6.3%
1970	534	−10.1%

Year	Pop.	±%
1980	526	−1.5%
1991	534	+1.5%
2001	571	+6.9%
2011	564	−1.2%
2021	547	−3.0%

Source: Censuses

== Transport ==
The D1 motorway from Brno to Ostrava runs through the eastern part of the municipality.

The Přerov–Břeclav railway crosses the municipality, but there is no train station. Žalkovice is served by the station in neighbouring Říkovice.

== Sights ==
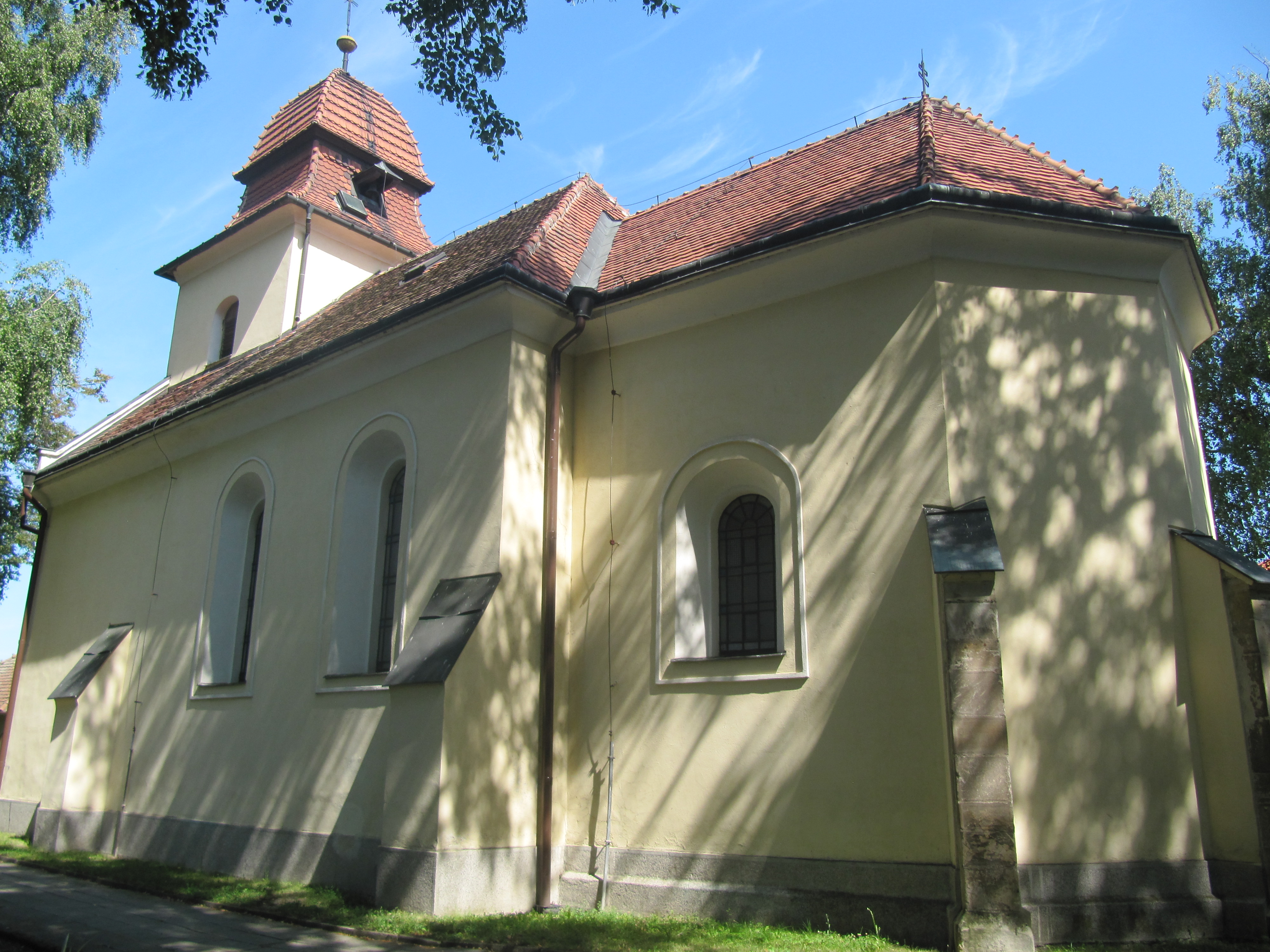
Church of Saint Nicholas

The main landmark of Žalkovice is the Church of Saint Nicholas. The original church from the 14th century was burned down in 1643, during the Thirty Years' War. In 1647, the current church was built. In 1927–1928, it was completely reconstructed.

The only protected cultural monument in the municipality is a late Baroque stone crucifix, located next to the church wall. It dates from 1760.
