= Horní Moštěnice =

- Municipality
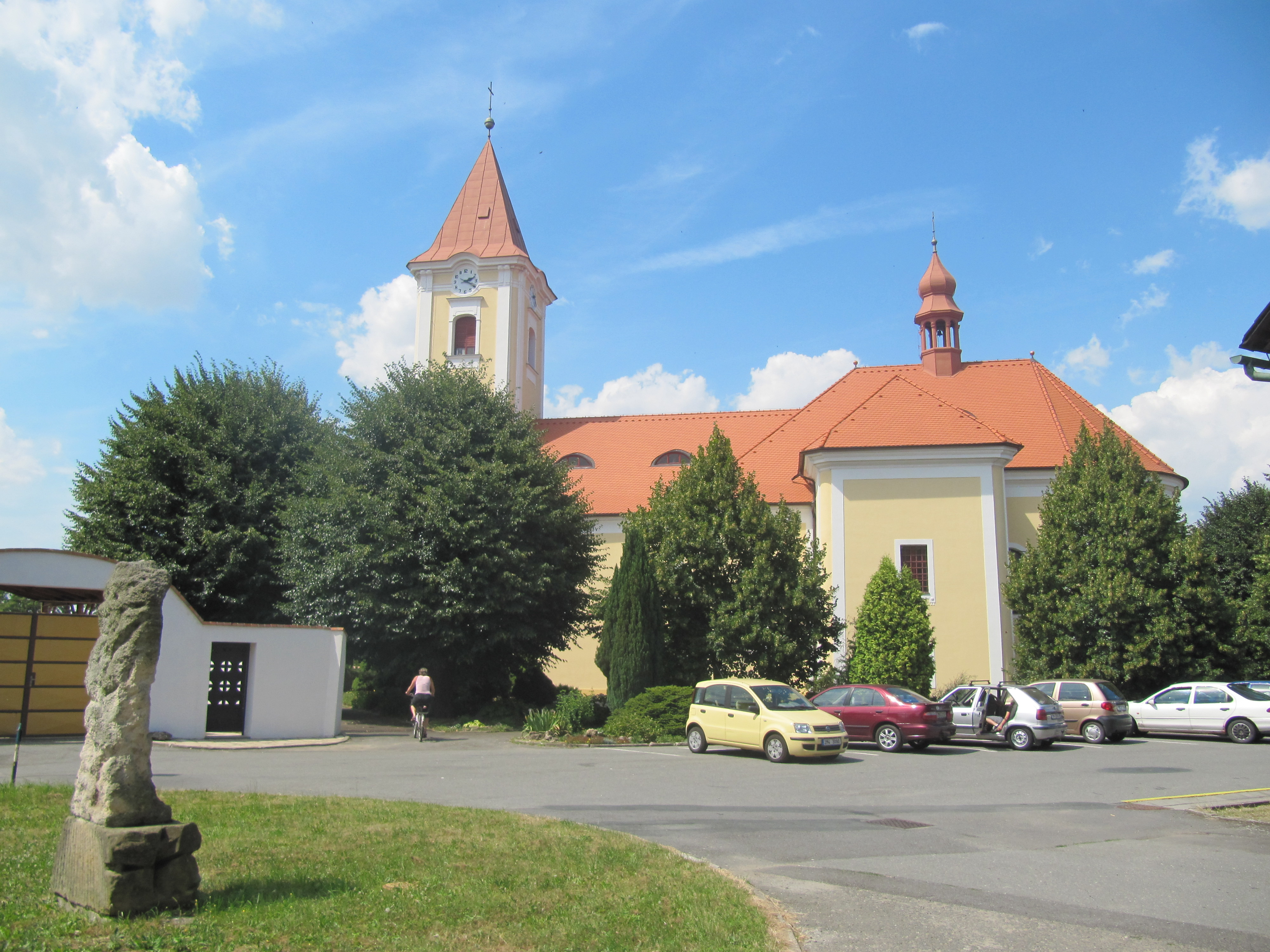
- Church of the Assumption of the Virgin Mary

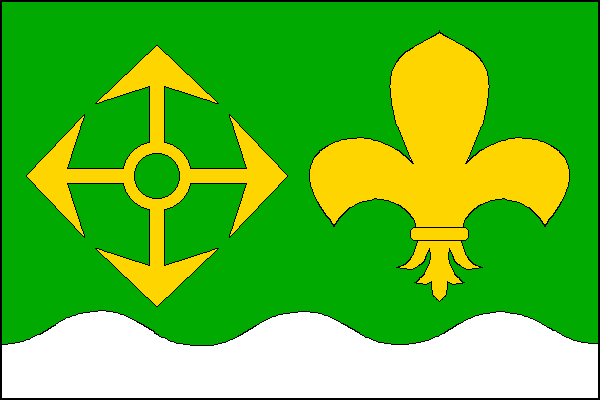
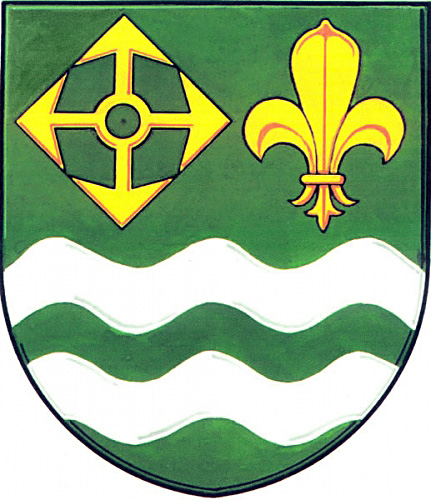
- Flag Coat of arms

- Location in the Czech Republic
- Coordinates: 49°24′44″N 17°27′32″E
- Country: Czech Republic
- Region: Olomouc
- District: Přerov
- First mentioned: 1141

Area
  - Total: 9.82 km^{2} (3.79 sq mi)
- Elevation: 216 m (709 ft)

Population (2026-01-01)
  - Total: 1,676
  - Density: 171/km^{2} (442/sq mi)
- Time zone: UTC+1 (CET)
  - Summer (DST): UTC+2 (CEST)
- Postal code: 751 17
- Website: www.hornimostenice.cz

Horní Moštěnice (German: Ober Moschtienitz) is a municipality and village in Přerov District in the Olomouc Region of the Czech Republic. It has about 1,700 inhabitants.

== Etymology ==
The name of Horní Moštěnice is from the time of Great Moravia, when there was an important route connecting Velehrad with Přerov and Olomouc, leading through hags and marshes, so the path had to be hardened by bundles of wicker called moština, giving later the name to the village.

== Geography ==
Horní Moštěnice is located about 4 kilometres (2 mi) south of Přerov and 24 km (15 mi) southeast of Olomouc. The western part of the municipality lies in the Upper Morava Valley and the eastern part lies in the Moravian-Silesian Foothills. The highest point is the hill Švédské šance at 298 m (978 ft) above sea level. The Moštěnka River flows through the municipality.

== History ==
The first written mention of Horní Moštěnice is from 1141. In 1551 Horní Moštěnice became a market town.

In 1643, during the Thirty Years' War, a fortification called Švédské šance (meaning 'Swedish rampart') was made by the Swedish troops. They assaulted other villages from this place. The fortification was used in World War II as well.

On 18–19 June 1945, Slovak Germans from Dobšiná were passing through Přerov while being transported back to Slovakia. Here they were taken out of the train by Slovak soldiers, taken outside the city to the hill Švédské šance, where they were forced to dig their own graves and all were shot (71 men, 120 women and 74 children).

== Demographics ==
Historical population

Year	Pop.	±%
1869	1,112	—
1880	1,200	+7.9%
1890	1,229	+2.4%
1900	1,415	+15.1%
1910	1,593	+12.6%

Year	Pop.	±%
1921	1,713	+7.5%
1930	1,642	−4.1%
1950	1,805	+9.9%
1961	1,862	+3.2%
1970	1,664	−10.6%

Year	Pop.	±%
1980	1,588	−4.6%
1991	1,543	−2.8%
2001	1,560	+1.1%
2011	1,607	+3.0%
2021	1,623	+1.0%

Source: Censuses

== Economy ==
There are three mineral springs in Horní Moštěnice. The best-known of them is bottled under the brand Hanácká kyselka.

== Transport ==
The I/55 road from Přerov to Otrokovice, which replaces an unfinished section of the D1 motorway, runs through the municipality.

== Sights ==
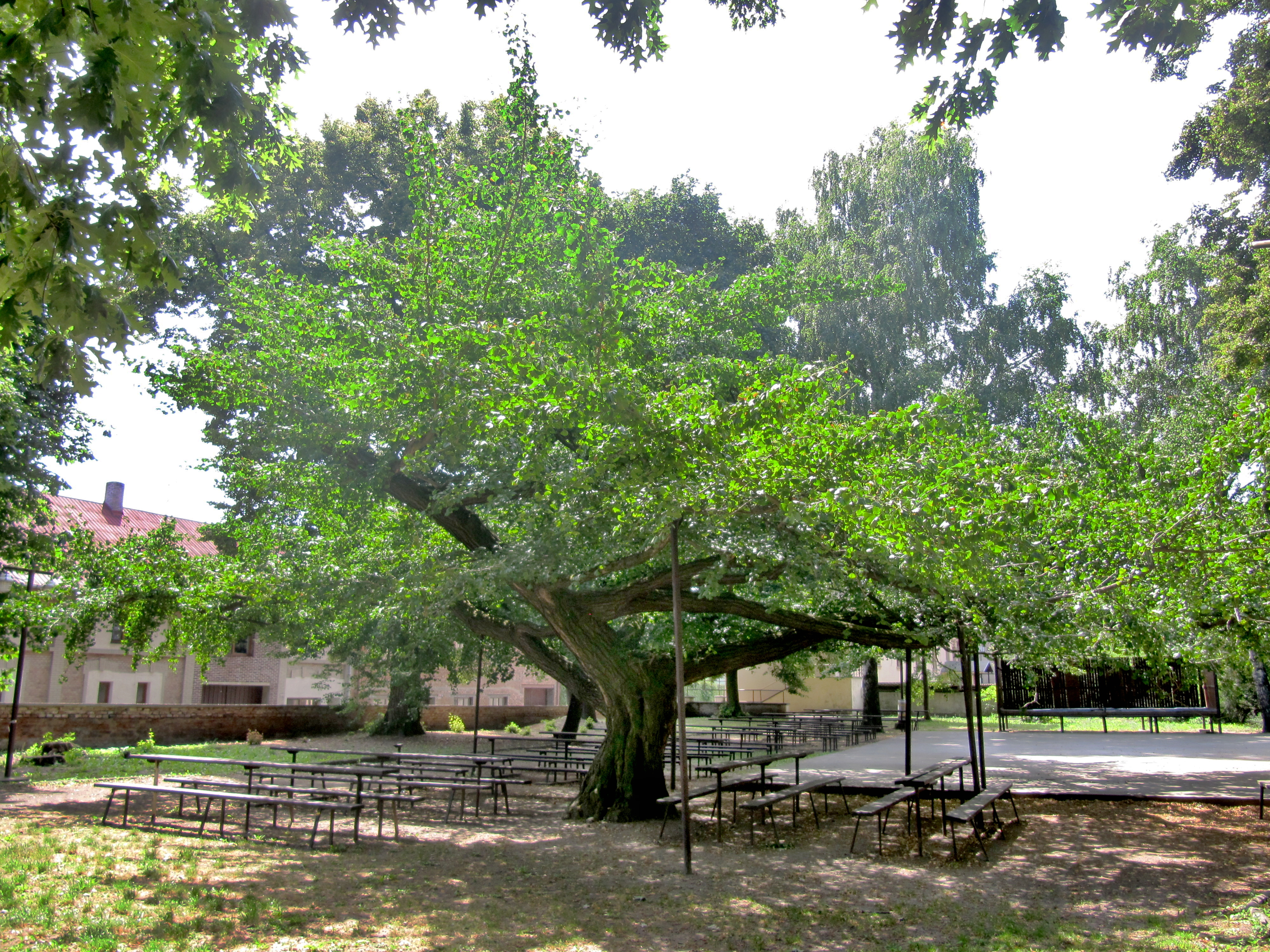
Castle park

The remains of the fortifications are still on Švédské šance and are protected as a cultural monument.

The late Baroque Church of the Assumption of the Virgin Mary dates from 1792.

The Horní Moštěnice Castle was built in the 18th century on the site of an old fortress. After insensitive reconstructions in the 20th century, only the façade was partially preserved. Today it houses the municipal office. Adjacent to the castle is a park with a several hundred years old ginkgo biloba tree.

== Paleontology ==
Sometimes prior to 1945, a fossil tooth of a megalosauroid theropod dinosaur was found on Švédské šance. It comes from the Late Jurassic sediments and it belonged to a middle sized theropod dinosaur about 5 metres long.
