= Chropyně =

- Town
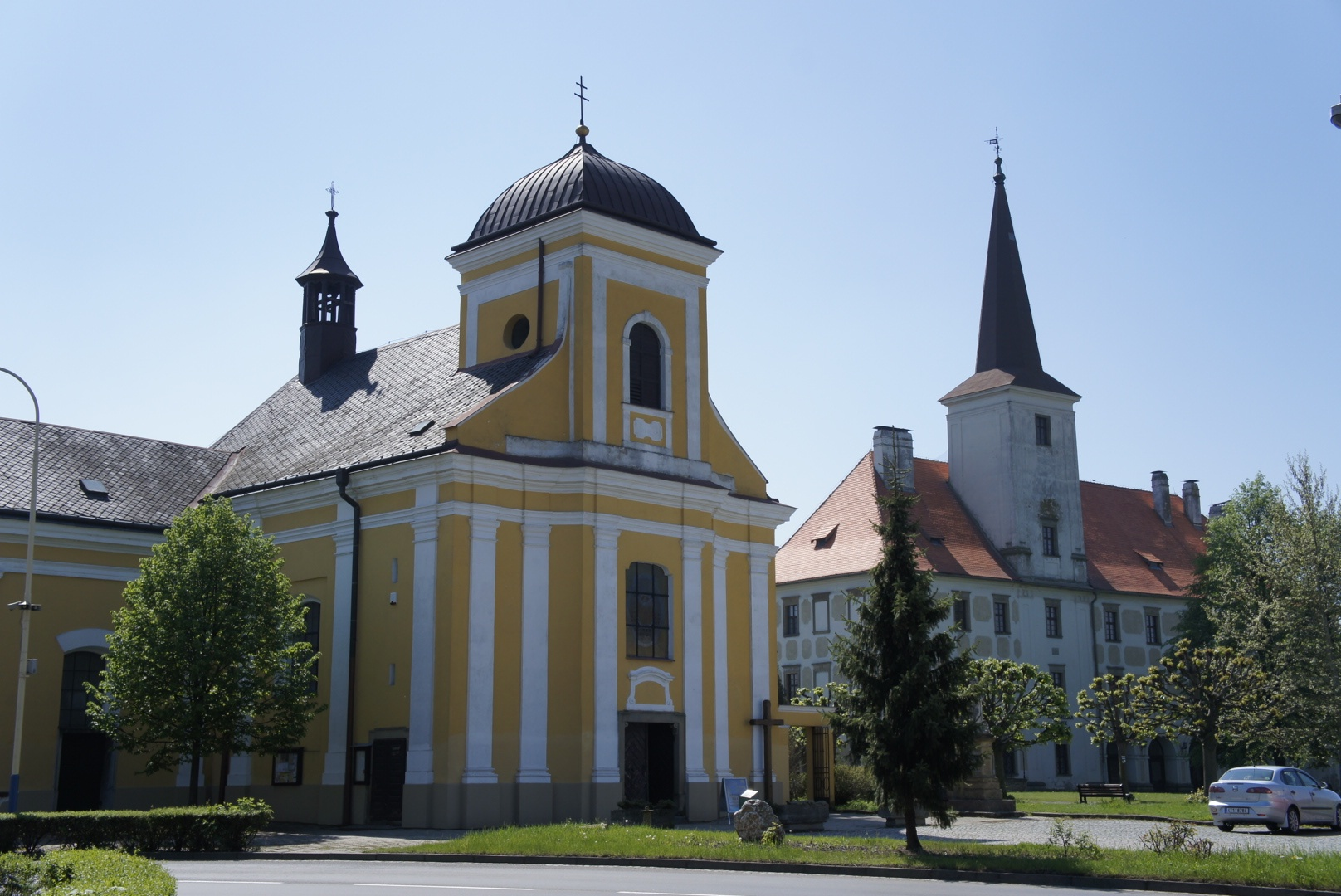
- Church of Saint Giles and Chropyně Castle

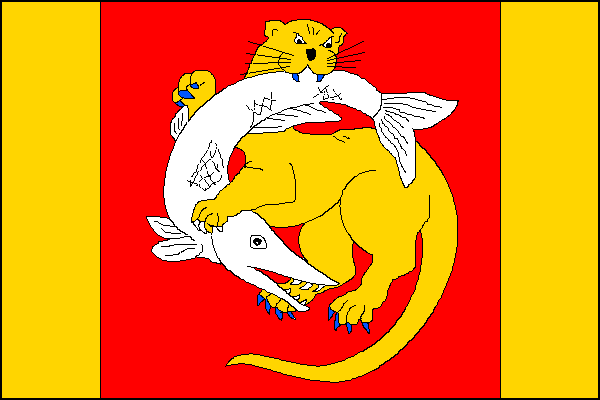
- Flag Coat of arms

- Location in the Czech Republic
- Coordinates: 49°21′42″N 17°21′53″E
- Country: Czech Republic
- Region: Zlín
- District: Kroměříž
- First mentioned: 1261

Government
  - Mayor: Michal Vlasatý

Area
  - Total: 19.00 km^{2} (7.34 sq mi)
- Elevation: 195 m (640 ft)

Population (2026-01-01)
  - Total: 4,582
  - Density: 241.2/km^{2} (624.6/sq mi)
- Time zone: UTC+1 (CET)
  - Summer (DST): UTC+2 (CEST)
- Postal code: 768 11
- Website: www.muchropyne.cz

Chropyně (Czech pronunciation: [ˈxropɪɲɛ]) is a town in Kroměříž District in the Zlín Region of the Czech Republic. It has about 4,600 inhabitants. The town is located in the Upper Morava Valley.

== Administrative division ==
Chropyně consists of two municipal parts (in brackets population according to the 2021 census):

- Chropyně (4,377)
- Plešovec (210)

== Etymology ==
The name is derived from the personal name Chrop, who owned a fotrtess here. Chropyně (meaning "Chrop's") was originally the name of the fortress, which was transferred to the settlement around it.

== Geography ==
Chropyně is located about 6 kilometres (4 mi) north of Kroměříž and 25 km (16 mi) northwest of Zlín. It lies in the Upper Morava Valley. The Malá Bečva canal and its branches flow through the town. The Malá Bečva flows to the Moštěnka River, which flows along the southeastern municipal border. The Morava River briefly flows along the southern border and its confluence with the Moštěnka is just outside the territory of Chropyně.

There are several fishponds in the municipal territory. The largest of them is Zámecký rybník in the centre of the town. The pond area is protected as a national nature reserve and the water caltrop (critically endangered in the Czech Republic) is found here.

== History ==
The first written mention of Chropyně is from 1261, when the settlement was donated to the newly established monastery in Vizovice. During the rule of the Lords of Ludanice in the 15th century, a set of fishponds was built here and Chropyně became the centre of a small estate. The fish farming brought economic prosperity to Chropyně and in 1535, it was promoted to a market town by King Ferdinand I.

In 1615–1617, Chropyně was owned by Cardinal Franz von Dietrichstein. From 1617 until the establishment of an independent municipality in 1848, it was a property of Olomouc bishopric. In the 19th century, many large fires damaged Chropyně.

A small spa for treatment of musculoskeletal disorders and diseases associated with high blood pressure was founded here in 1950. In 1970, Chropyně was promoted to a town. The town was damaged by the 1997 Central European flood and the spa was completely destroyed.

== Demographics ==
Historical population

| Year | Pop. | ±% |
|---|---|---|
| 1869 | 2,006 | — |
| 1880 | 2,381 | +18.7% |
| 1890 | 2,498 | +4.9% |
| 1900 | 2,890 | +15.7% |
| 1910 | 3,041 | +5.2% |

| Year | Pop. | ±% |
|---|---|---|
| 1921 | 2,953 | −2.9% |
| 1930 | 2,972 | +0.6% |
| 1950 | 2,470 | −16.9% |
| 1961 | 3,137 | +27.0% |
| 1970 | 3,462 | +10.4% |

| Year | Pop. | ±% |
|---|---|---|
| 1980 | 5,021 | +45.0% |
| 1991 | 5,388 | +7.3% |
| 2001 | 5,256 | −2.4% |
| 2011 | 4,905 | −6.7% |
| 2021 | 4,587 | −6.5% |

Source: Censuses

== Economy ==
The main employer is Chropyňská strojírna, which deals with installation of industrial machinery. It has more than 500 employees.

== Transport ==
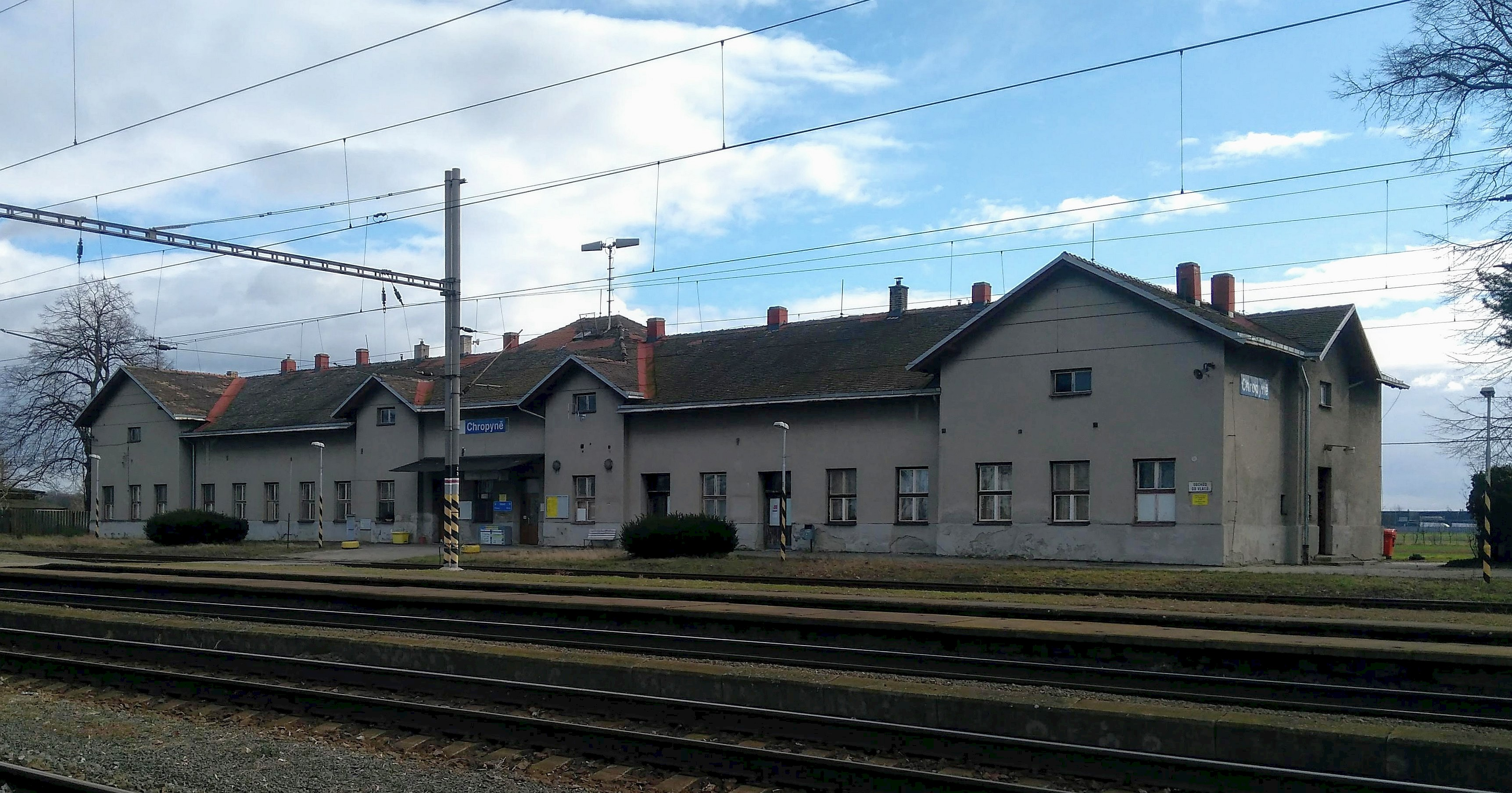
Train station

Chropyně is located on the railway line Šumperk–Vyškov.

== Sights ==
The main landmark is the Chropyně Castle. It was built in 1615 on the site of an older castle. In the 19th century, it was modified to a hunting lodge. Today it is open to the public. It contains several expositions, including the monument of painter Emil Filla, who is the most famous native of Chropyně.

The Church of Saint Giles has a medieval Romenasque core from the mid-13th century. It was rebuilt in the Baroque style in 1761–1772.

== Notable people ==
- Emil Filla (1882–1953), painter
