= Loukov =

Loukov may refer to places in the Czech Republic:

- Loukov (Kroměříž District), a municipality and village in the Zlín Region
- Loukov (Mladá Boleslav District), a municipality and village in the Central Bohemian Region
- Loukov, a village and part of Dolní Město in the Vysočina Region
- Loukov, a village and part of Háje nad Jizerou in the Liberec Region
