= Dřevohostice =

- Market town
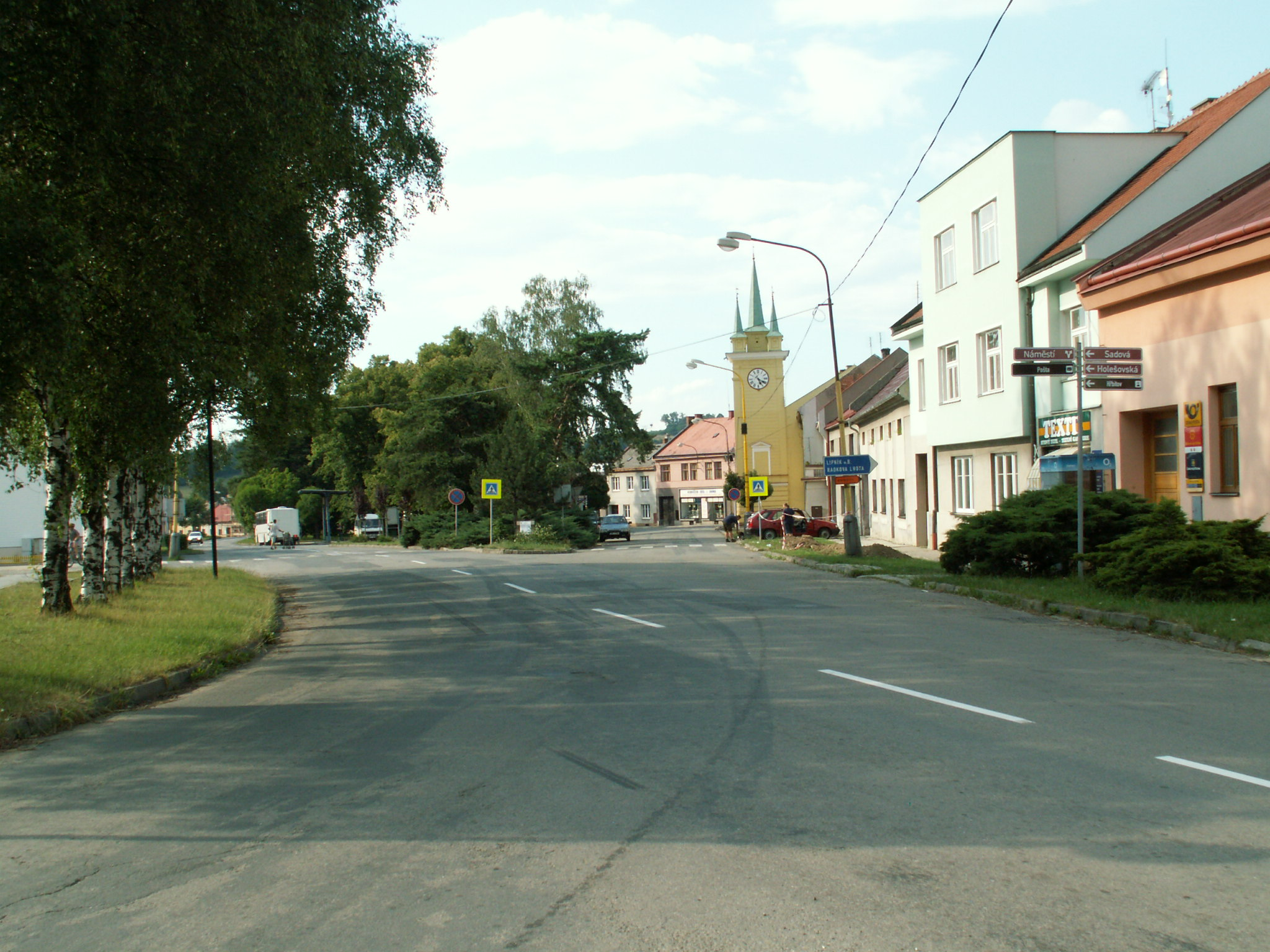
- Centre of Dřevohostice

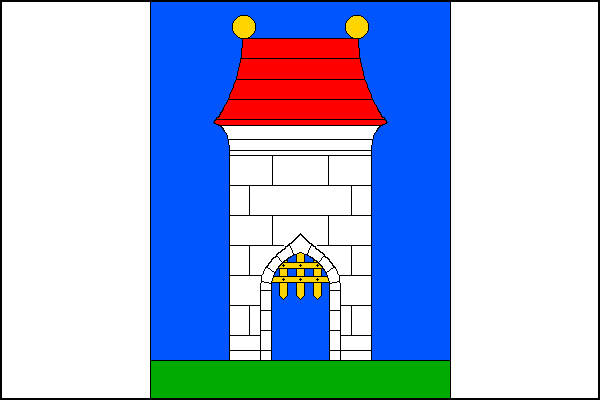
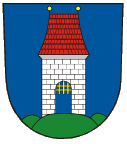
- Flag Coat of arms

- Location in the Czech Republic
- Coordinates: 49°25′33″N 17°35′31″E
- Country: Czech Republic
- Region: Olomouc
- District: Přerov
- First mentioned: 1326

Area
  - Total: 8.48 km^{2} (3.27 sq mi)
- Elevation: 239 m (784 ft)

Population (2026-01-01)
  - Total: 1,427
  - Density: 168/km^{2} (436/sq mi)
- Time zone: UTC+1 (CET)
  - Summer (DST): UTC+2 (CEST)
- Postal code: 751 14
- Website: www.drevohostice.cz

Dřevohostice (Czech pronunciation: [ˈdr̝ɛvoɦoscɪtsɛ]) is a market town in Přerov District in the Olomouc Region of the Czech Republic. It has about 1,400 inhabitants.

== Geography ==
Dřevohostice is located about 10 kilometres (6 mi) east of Přerov and 29 km (18 mi) southeast of Olomouc. It lies in the Moravian-Silesian Foothills. The highest point is the hill Olehlá at 317 m (1,040 ft) above sea level. The market town is situated at the confluence of Moštěnka River and the Bystřička Stream.

== History ==
The first written mention of Dřevohostice is from 1326. From 1368, it was referred to as a market town. From the 15th century, it was owned by the Zierotin family.

== Demographics ==
Historical population

Year	Pop.	±%
1869	1,182	—
1880	1,287	+8.9%
1890	1,282	−0.4%
1900	1,341	+4.6%
1910	1,601	+19.4%

Year	Pop.	±%
1921	1,488	−7.1%
1930	1,528	+2.7%
1950	1,518	−0.7%
1961	1,565	+3.1%
1970	1,532	−2.1%

Year	Pop.	±%
1980	1,588	+3.7%
1991	1,549	−2.5%
2001	1,568	+1.2%
2011	1,508	−3.8%
2021	1,451	−3.8%

Source: Censuses

== Transport ==
There are no railways or major roads passing through the municipality.

== Culture ==
Two cultural events are held in the castle gardens of the Dřevohostice Castle every year. Dřevorockfest is an open-air festival of rock music where mainly Czech bands gather. This festival has been held since 2005.

The second annual event is Setkání dechových hudeb ('gathering of brass bands'). This event usually involves multiple bands especially from Haná and Moravian Slovakia regions. The festival was held for the first time in 1994.

== Sights ==
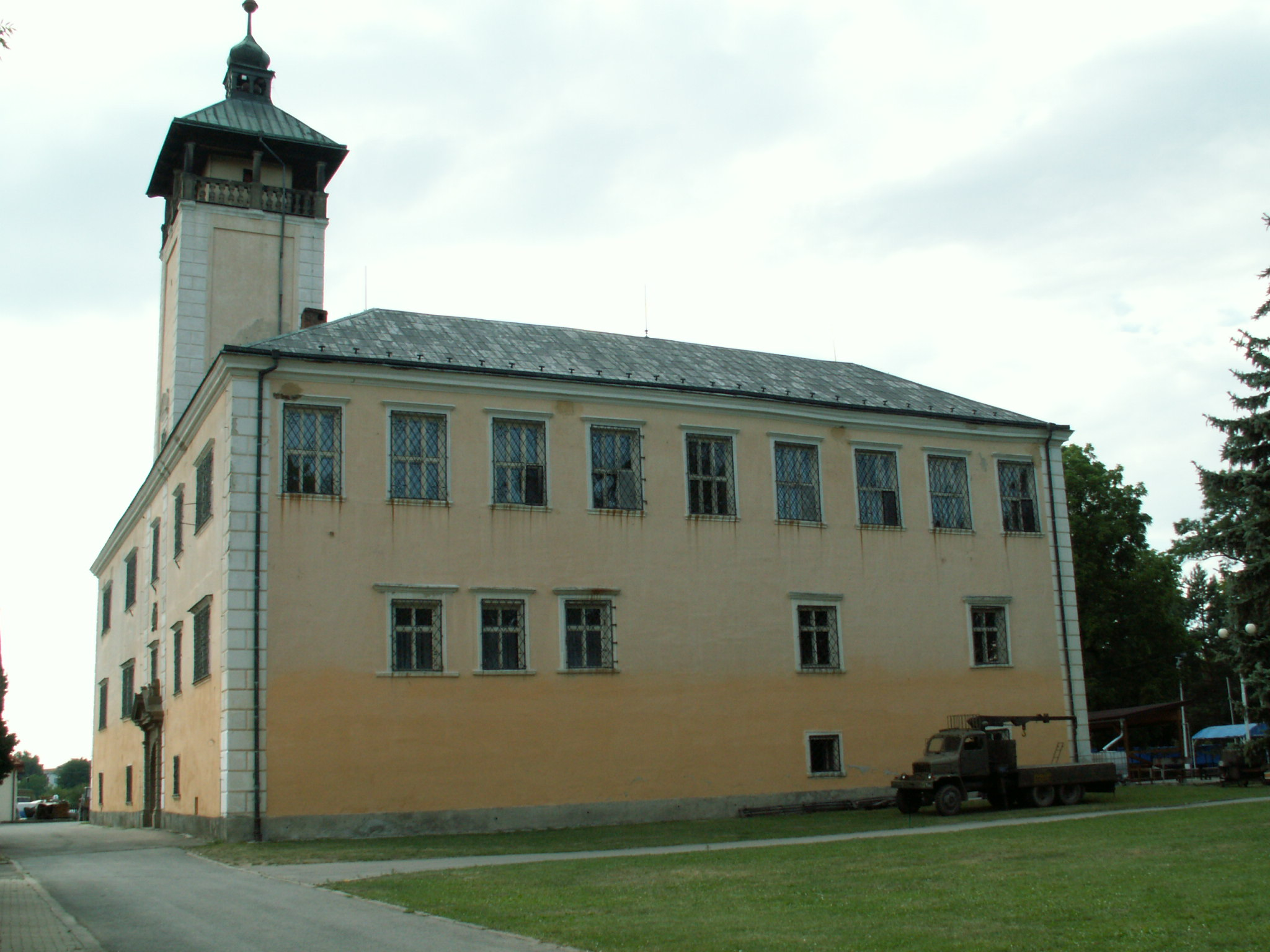
Dřevohostice Castle

The main landmark of Dřevohostice is the Dřevohostice Castle. It is a Renaissance four-winged castle, built in 1595–1617. It was created by reconstruction of an old water fortress from the 14th century. Since 2002, it has been serving the cultural and social needs of the market town, and it also houses the exhibition of the sculptor Jiří Lender, the memorial hall of Cardinal Lev Skrbenský z Hříště and the museum of firefighting equipment.

Another cultural monument is the Church of Saint Gall, built in the late Baroque style in the second half of the 18th century.

== Twin towns – sister cities ==
Dřevohostice is twinned with:

- Turawa, Poland
