= Osíčko =

- Municipality
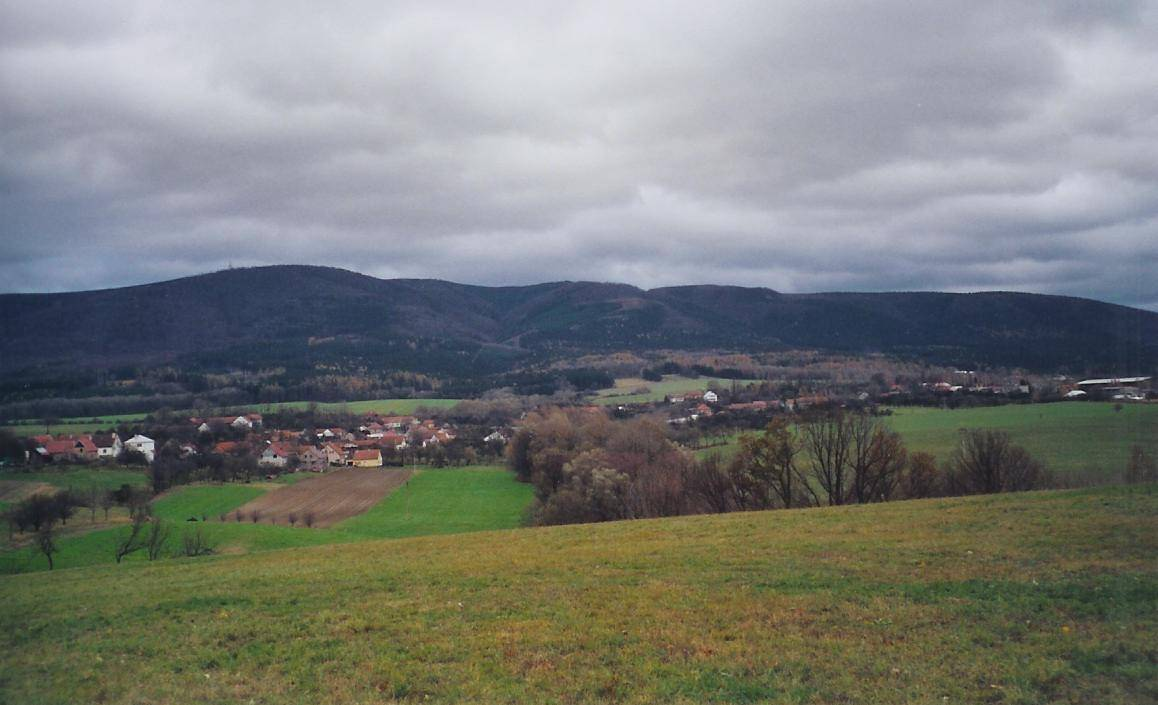
- General view

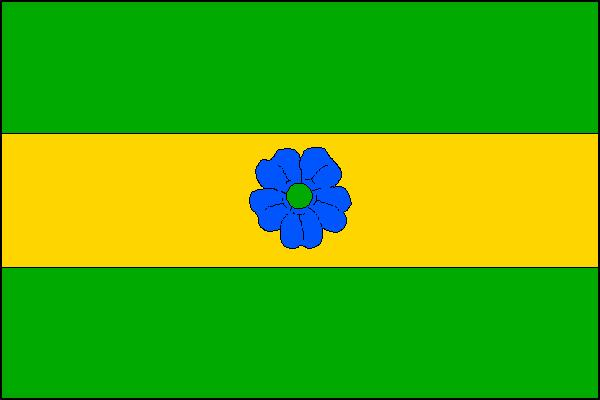
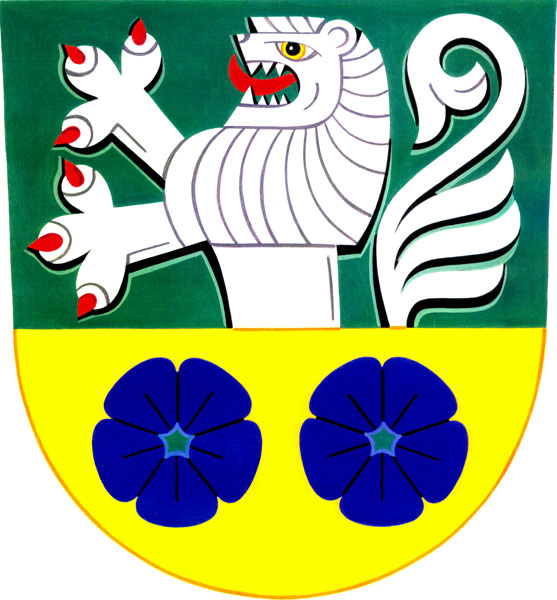
- Flag Coat of arms

- Location in the Czech Republic
- Coordinates: 49°25′52″N 17°45′5″E
- Country: Czech Republic
- Region: Zlín
- District: Kroměříž
- First mentioned: 1360

Area
  - Total: 7.94 km^{2} (3.07 sq mi)
- Elevation: 356 m (1,168 ft)

Population (2026-01-01)
  - Total: 457
  - Density: 57.6/km^{2} (149/sq mi)
- Time zone: UTC+1 (CET)
  - Summer (DST): UTC+2 (CEST)
- Postal code: 768 61
- Website: www.osicko.cz

Osíčko is a municipality and village in Kroměříž District in the Zlín Region of the Czech Republic. It has about 500 inhabitants.

Osíčko lies approximately 30 kilometres (19 mi) north-east of Kroměříž, 22 km (14 mi) north of Zlín, and 251 km (156 mi) east of Prague.

== Demographics ==
Historical population
Year	Pop.	±%
1869	510	—
1880	564	+10.6%
1890	560	−0.7%
1900	540	−3.6%
1910	550	+1.9%
1921	550	+0.0%
1930	599	+8.9%
1950	508	−15.2%
1961	582	+14.6%
1970	526	−9.6%
1980	495	−5.9%
1991	472	−4.6%
2001	477	+1.1%
2011	463	−2.9%
2021	417	−9.9%
Source: Censuses
