= Loukov (Kroměříž District) =

- Municipality
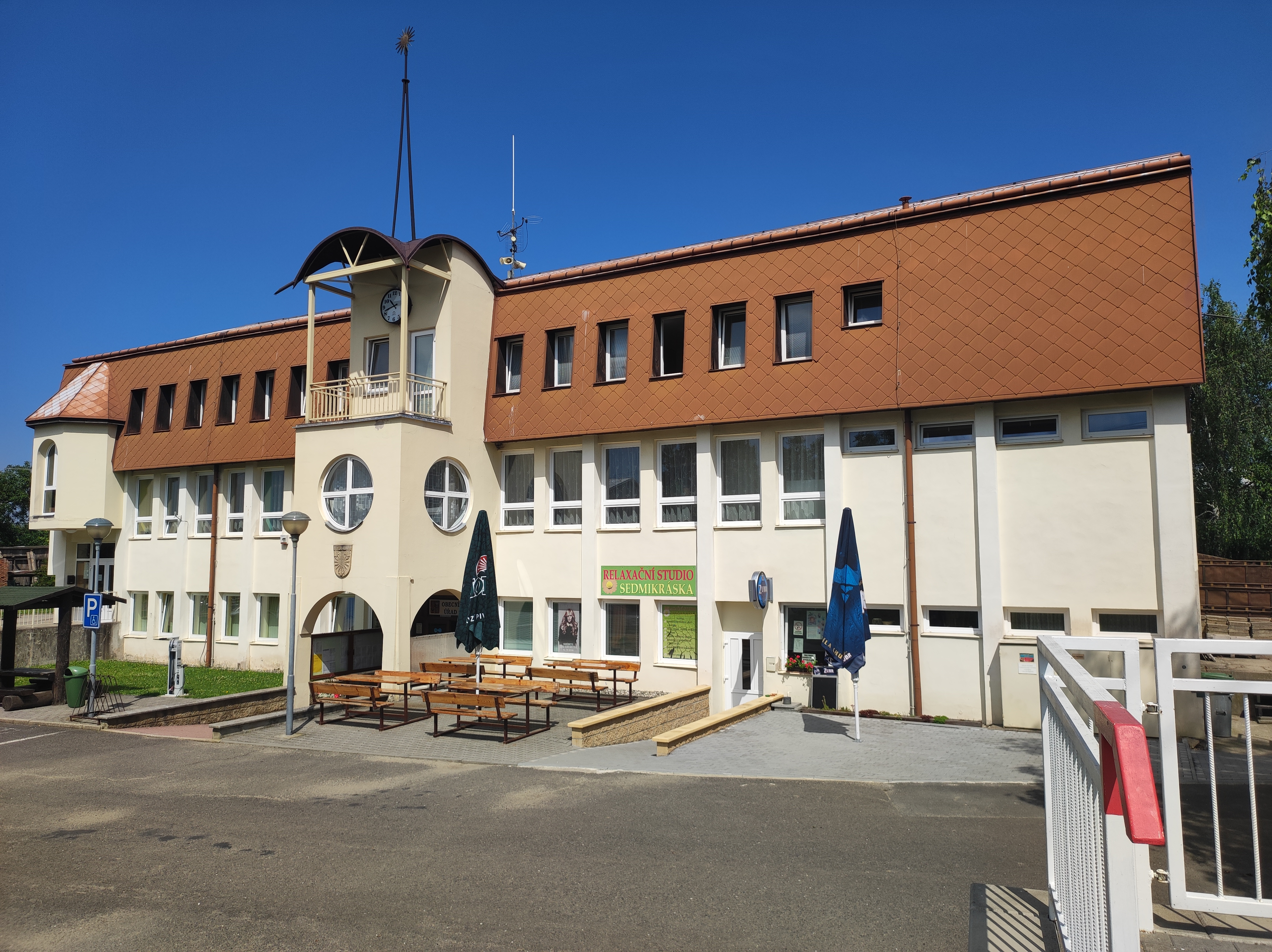
- Municipal office

- Flag Coat of arms

- Location in the Czech Republic
- Coordinates: 49°25′18″N 17°43′16″E
- Country: Czech Republic
- Region: Zlín
- District: Kroměříž
- First mentioned: 1348

Area
  - Total: 14.72 km^{2} (5.68 sq mi)
- Elevation: 342 m (1,122 ft)

Population (2026-01-01)
  - Total: 936
  - Density: 63.6/km^{2} (165/sq mi)
- Time zone: UTC+1 (CET)
  - Summer (DST): UTC+2 (CEST)
- Postal code: 768 75
- Website: loukov.cz

Loukov is a municipality and village in Kroměříž District in the Zlín Region of the Czech Republic. It has about 900 inhabitants.

Loukov lies approximately 28 kilometres (17 mi) north-east of Kroměříž, 21 km (13 mi) north of Zlín, and 249 km (155 mi) east of Prague. The Moštěnka River originates in the municipal territory.

== Administrative division ==
Loukov consists of two municipal parts (in brackets population according to the 2021 census):

- Loukov (677)
- Libosváry (212)

== Demographics ==
Historical population
Year	Pop.	±%
1869	862	—
1880	943	+9.4%
1890	1,015	+7.6%
1900	984	−3.1%
1910	1,070	+8.7%
1921	995	−7.0%
1930	1,017	+2.2%
1950	945	−7.1%
1961	1,100	+16.4%
1970	975	−11.4%
1980	912	−6.5%
1991	913	+0.1%
2001	921	+0.9%
2011	957	+3.9%
2021	889	−7.1%
Source: Censuses
