= Radkovy =

- Municipality
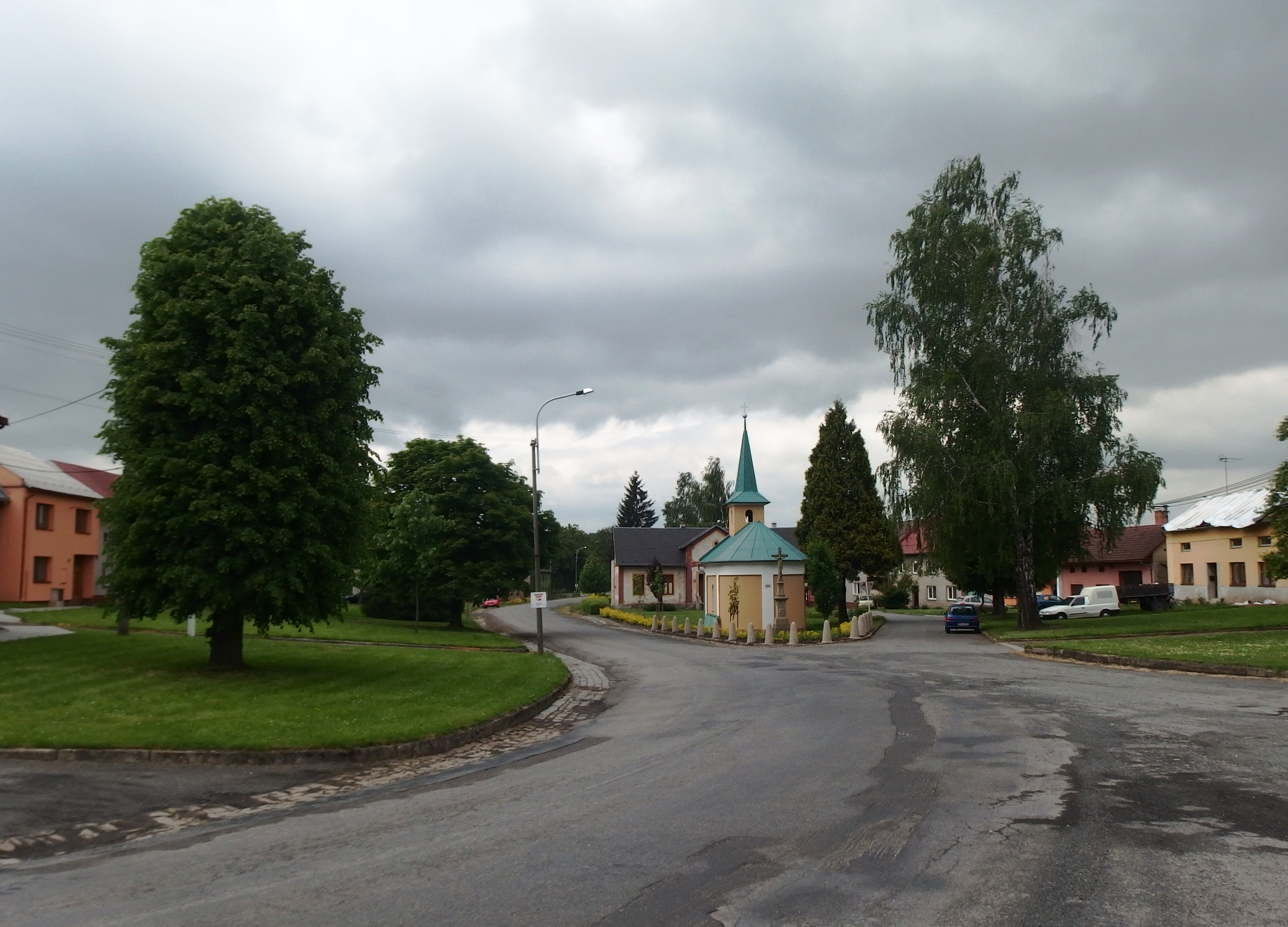
- Centre of Radkovy

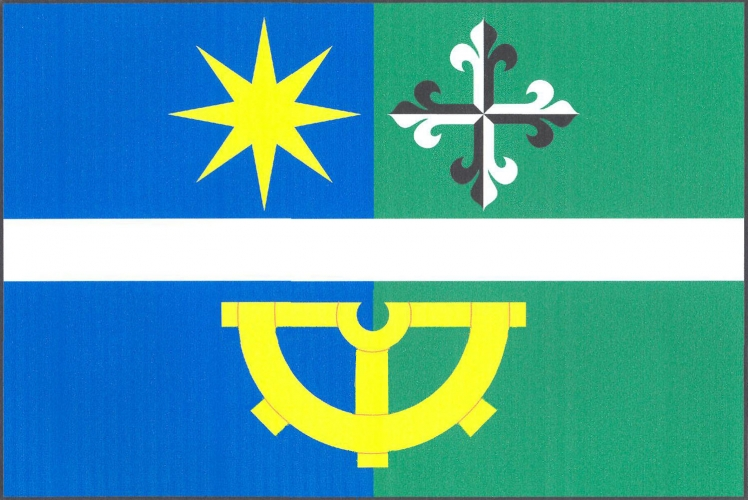
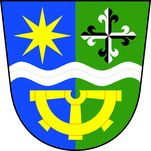
- Flag Coat of arms

- Location in the Czech Republic
- Coordinates: 49°26′10″N 17°36′53″E
- Country: Czech Republic
- Region: Olomouc
- District: Přerov
- First mentioned: 1371

Area
  - Total: 2.53 km^{2} (0.98 sq mi)
- Elevation: 244 m (801 ft)

Population (2026-01-01)
  - Total: 148
  - Density: 58.5/km^{2} (152/sq mi)
- Time zone: UTC+1 (CET)
  - Summer (DST): UTC+2 (CEST)
- Postal code: 751 14
- Website: www.radkovy.cz

Radkovy is a municipality and village in Přerov District in the Olomouc Region of the Czech Republic. It has about 100 inhabitants.

Radkovy lies approximately 13 kilometres (8 mi) east of Přerov, 33 km (21 mi) south-east of Olomouc, and 242 km (150 mi) east of Prague.

== Demographics ==
Historical population
Year	Pop.	±%
1869	214	—
1880	223	+4.2%
1890	213	−4.5%
1900	239	+12.2%
1910	245	+2.5%
1921	242	−1.2%
1930	272	+12.4%
1950	203	−25.4%
1961	193	−4.9%
1970	185	−4.1%
1980	187	+1.1%
1991	178	−4.8%
2001	177	−0.6%
2011	165	−6.8%
2021	141	−14.5%
Source: Censuses
