= Morava (river) =

River in Central Europe

Morava March
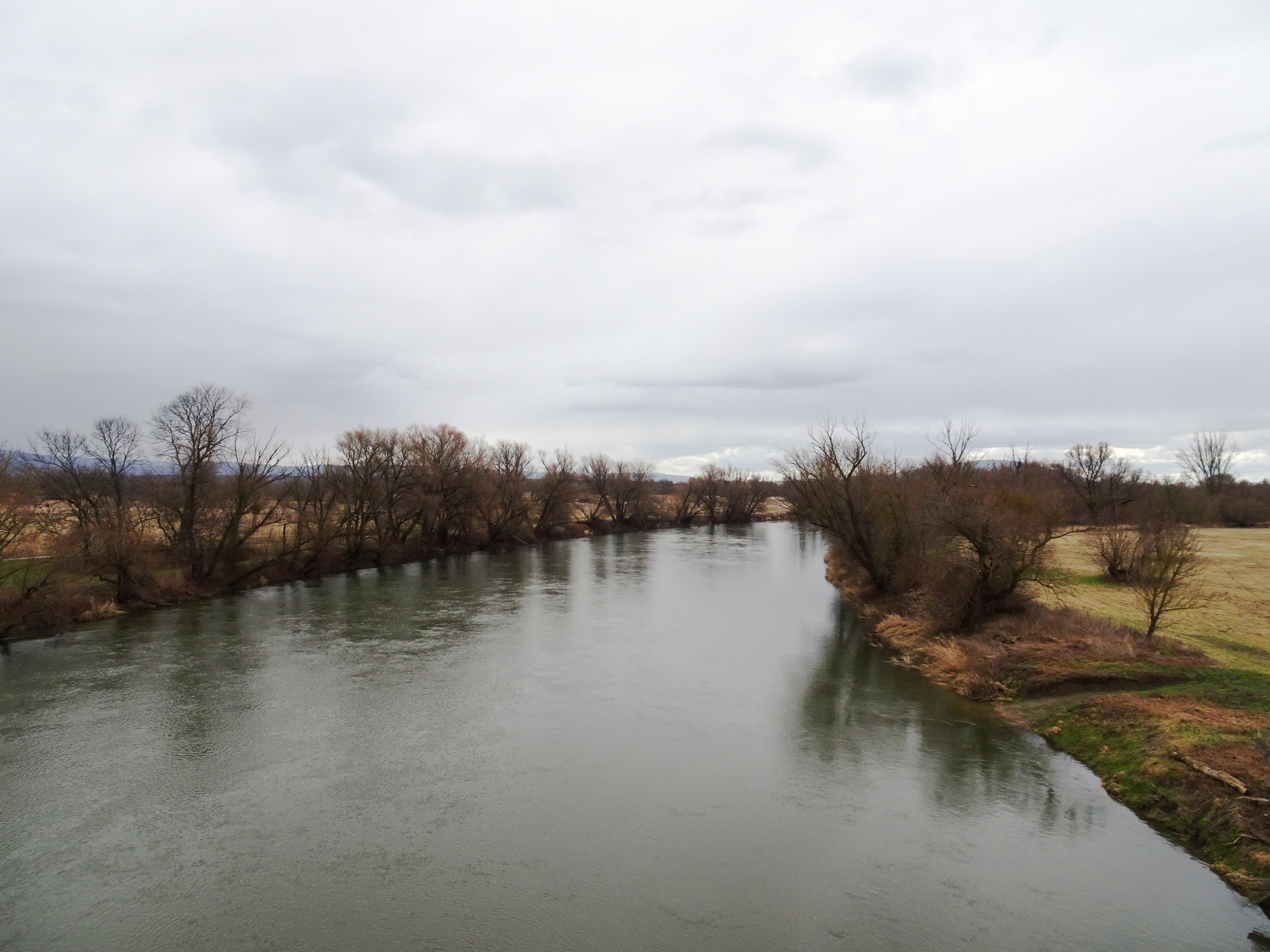
- The Morava between Austria and Slovakia

Location
- Countries: Czech Republic; Slovakia; Austria
- Regions (CZ): Pardubice; Olomouc; Zlín; South Moravian
- Regions (SK): Trnava; Bratislava
- State (AT): Lower Austria
- Cities and towns: Olomouc; Kroměříž; Uherské Hradiště; Hodonín; Bratislava

Physical characteristics
- Source
  - location: Dolní Morava, Králický Sněžník
  - coordinates: 50°12′18″N 16°50′58″E
  - elevation: 1,371 m (4,498 ft)
- Mouth
  - location: Danube
  - coordinates: 48°10′27″N 16°58′32″E
  - elevation: 139 m (456 ft)
- Length: 352 km (219 mi)
- Basin size: 26,658 km^{2} (10,293 sq mi)
- Discharge
  - average: 110 m^{3}/s (3,900 cu ft/s) near estuary

Basin features
- Progression: Danube→ Black Sea

The Morava (Czech pronunciation: [ˈmorava]; German: March) is a river in Central Europe, a left tributary of the Danube. It is the main river of Moravia historical region in the Czech Republic, which derives its name from the river. The Morava originates on the Králický Sněžník mountain in the north-eastern corner of Pardubice Region, near the border between the Czech Republic and Poland and has a vaguely southward trajectory. The lower part of the river's course forms the border between the Czech Republic and Slovakia and then between Austria and Slovakia.

== Etymology ==
The root of the river's name, mor-, is derived from the Proto-Indo-European word for 'water', 'marsh', from which the Latin word mare arose. The suffix -ava is a Slavic form of the Proto-Germanic word ahwa, meaning 'water', 'river'. The name of the river was first documented as Maraha in an 892 deed. The river gave its name to the entire historical land of Moravia, yet the oldest surviving record of the land (from 822) is older than the record of the river. The German name of the Morava, March, was derived from the Slavic name.

== History ==
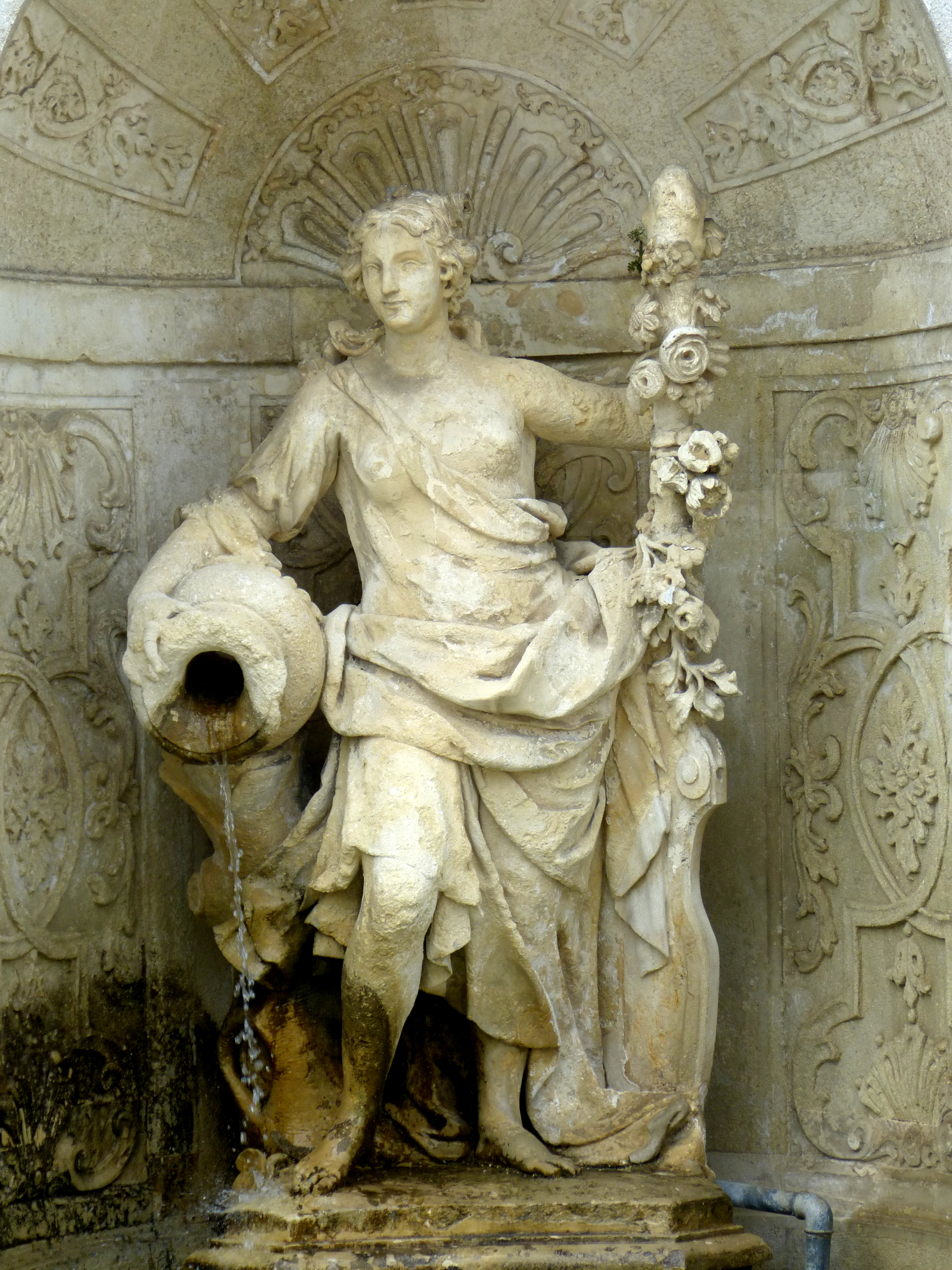
An allegory of the Morava at Schloss Hof in Marchfield, Austria

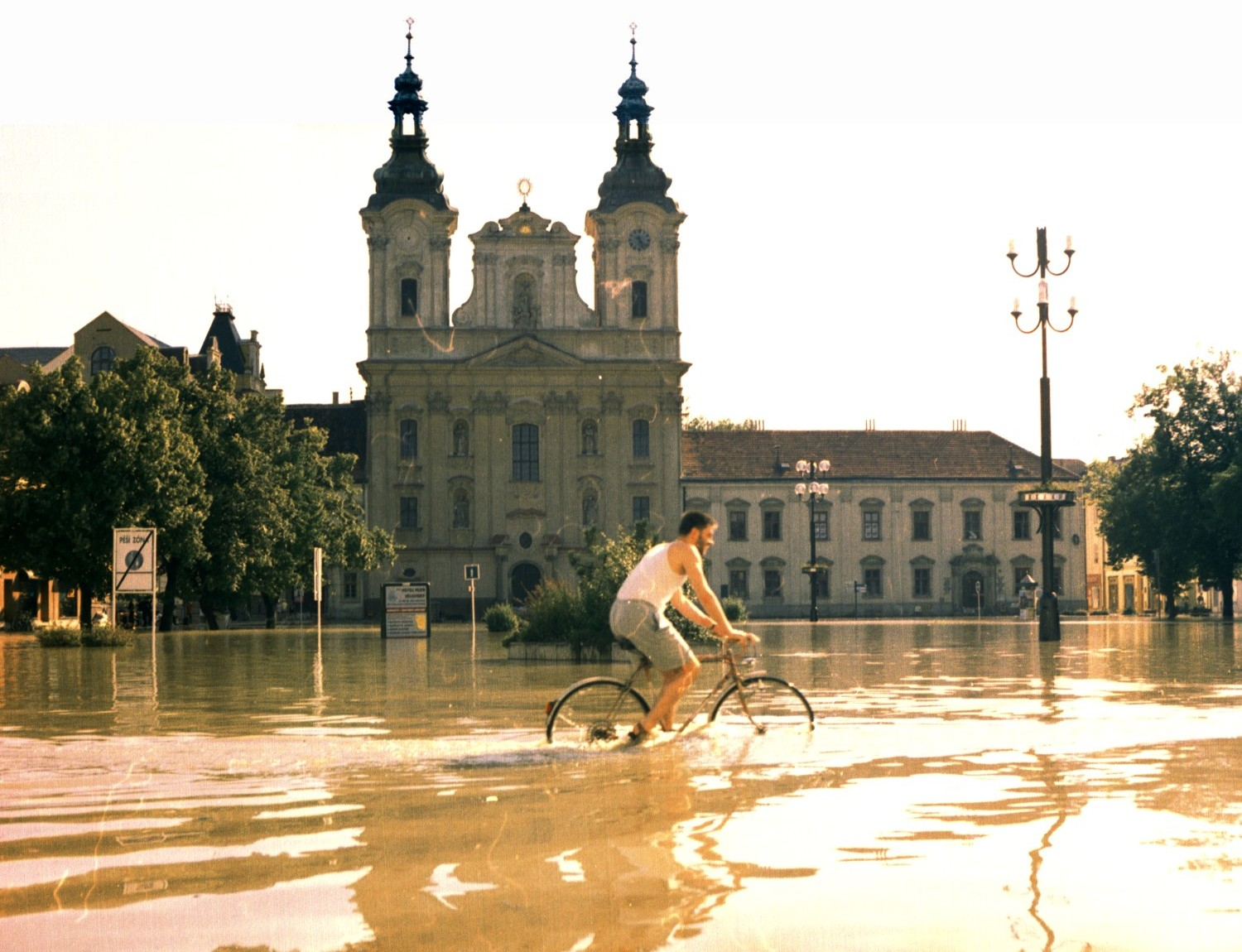
The 1997 flood in Uherské Hradiště

The banks of the Morava have been inhabited for a very long time. The village of Stillfried, on the Austrian part of the river, was already the location of a human settlement 30,000 years ago. Agriculture began to be practiced in the Morava valley approximately 7,000 years ago, and fortified settlements began to appear during the New Stone Age.

The lower part of the river, downstream of the confluence with the Thaya at Hohenau an der March, which today marks the Austrian–Slovak border, is one of the oldest national boundaries still extant in continental Europe. It was the eastern boundary of the Carolingian Empire with the Avar Khaganate around 800, and from the 10th century onward marked the border of the Imperial marcha orientalis, later Duchy of Austria, with the Kingdom of Hungary (within the Habsburg monarchy during the period 1526–1918 because of imperial expansion). During the Cold War, this section of the river was part of the Iron Curtain, forming the frontier between Austria and Czechoslovakia.

In July 1997, the Morava basin (especially its northern and eastern part) was affected by heavy stratiform rain, which lasted several days and caused catastrophic floods.

== Course ==
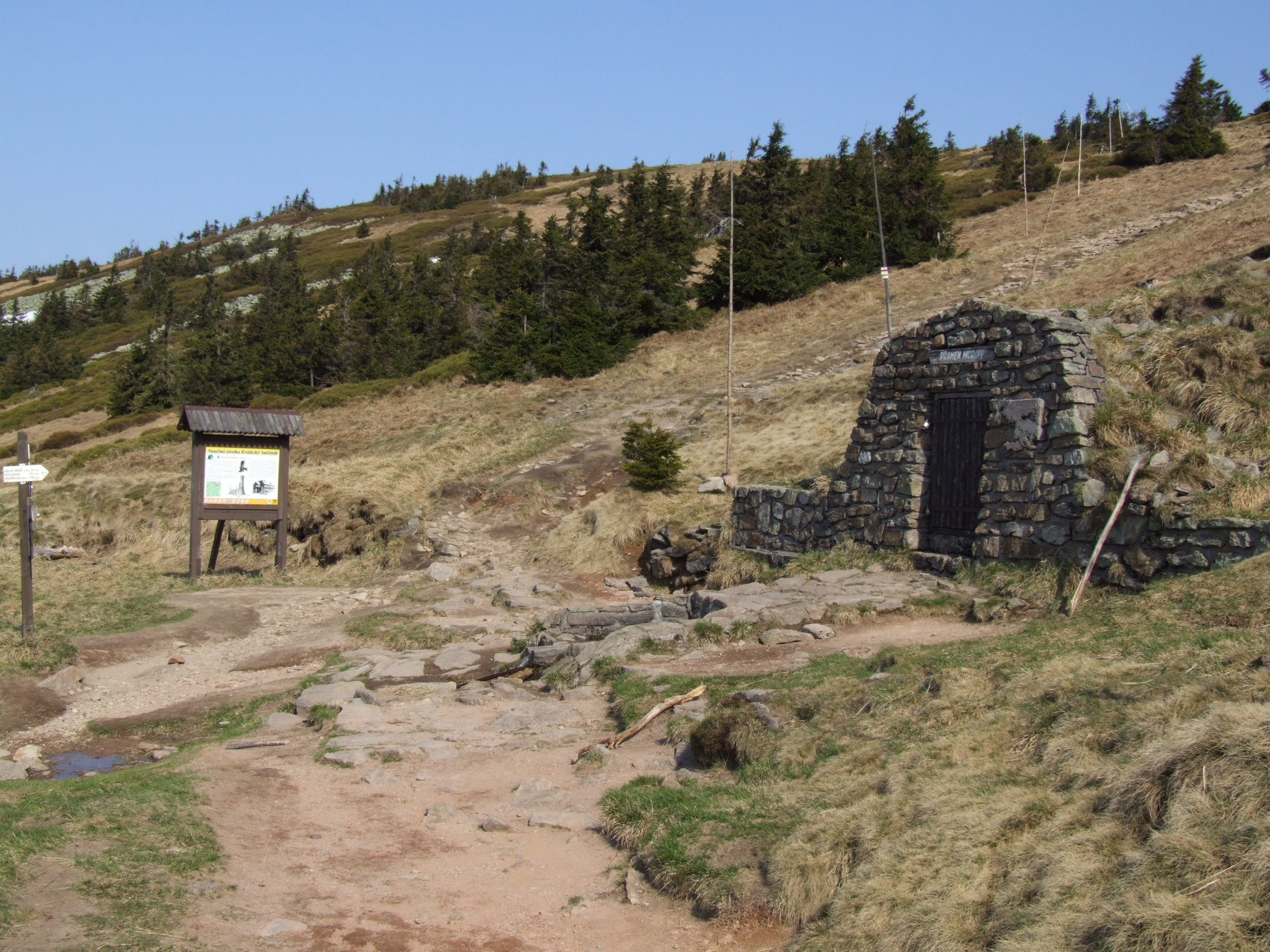
Source of the Morava on Králický Sněžník

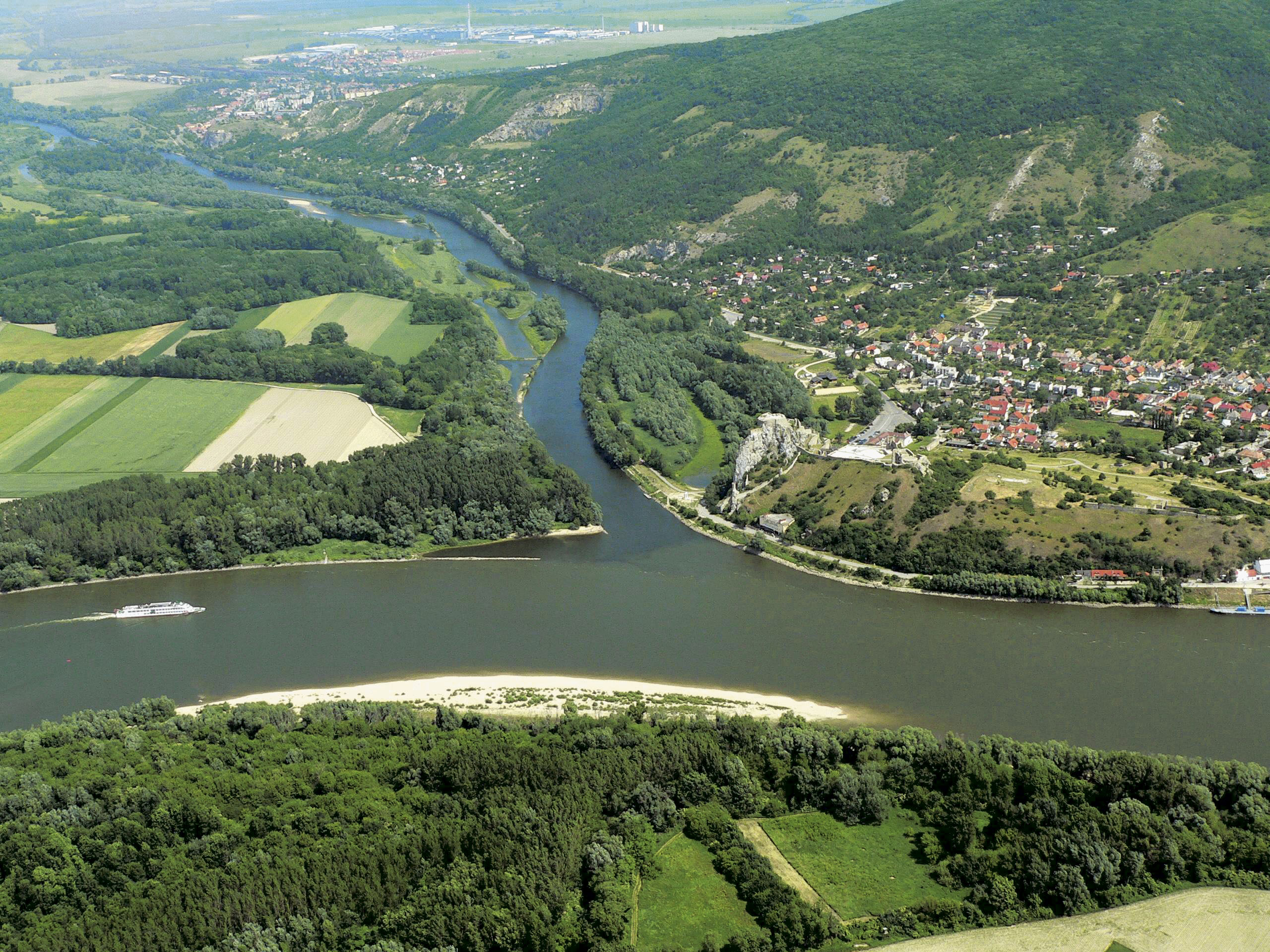
Confluence of the Morava and the Danube

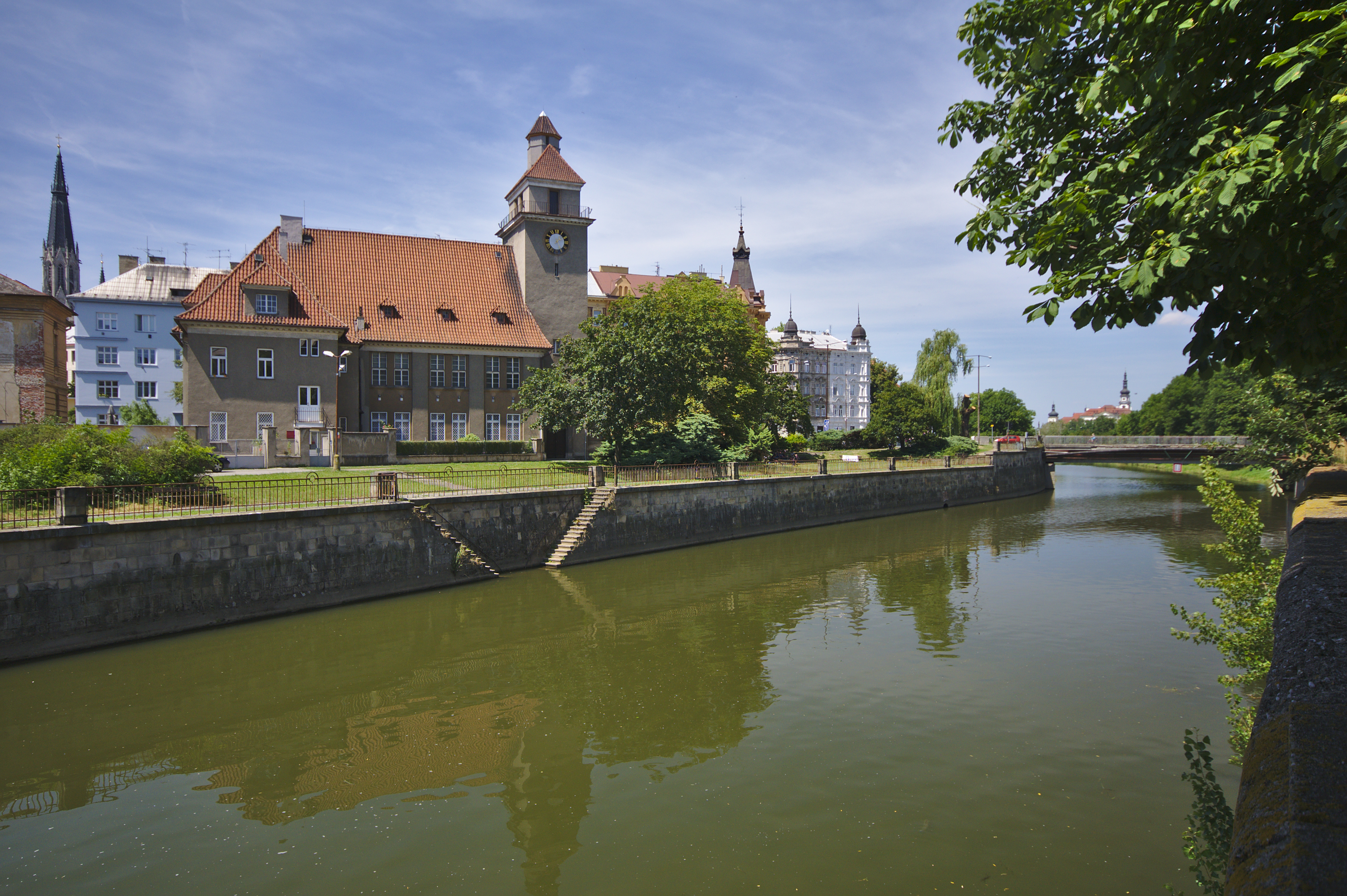
The Morava in Olomouc

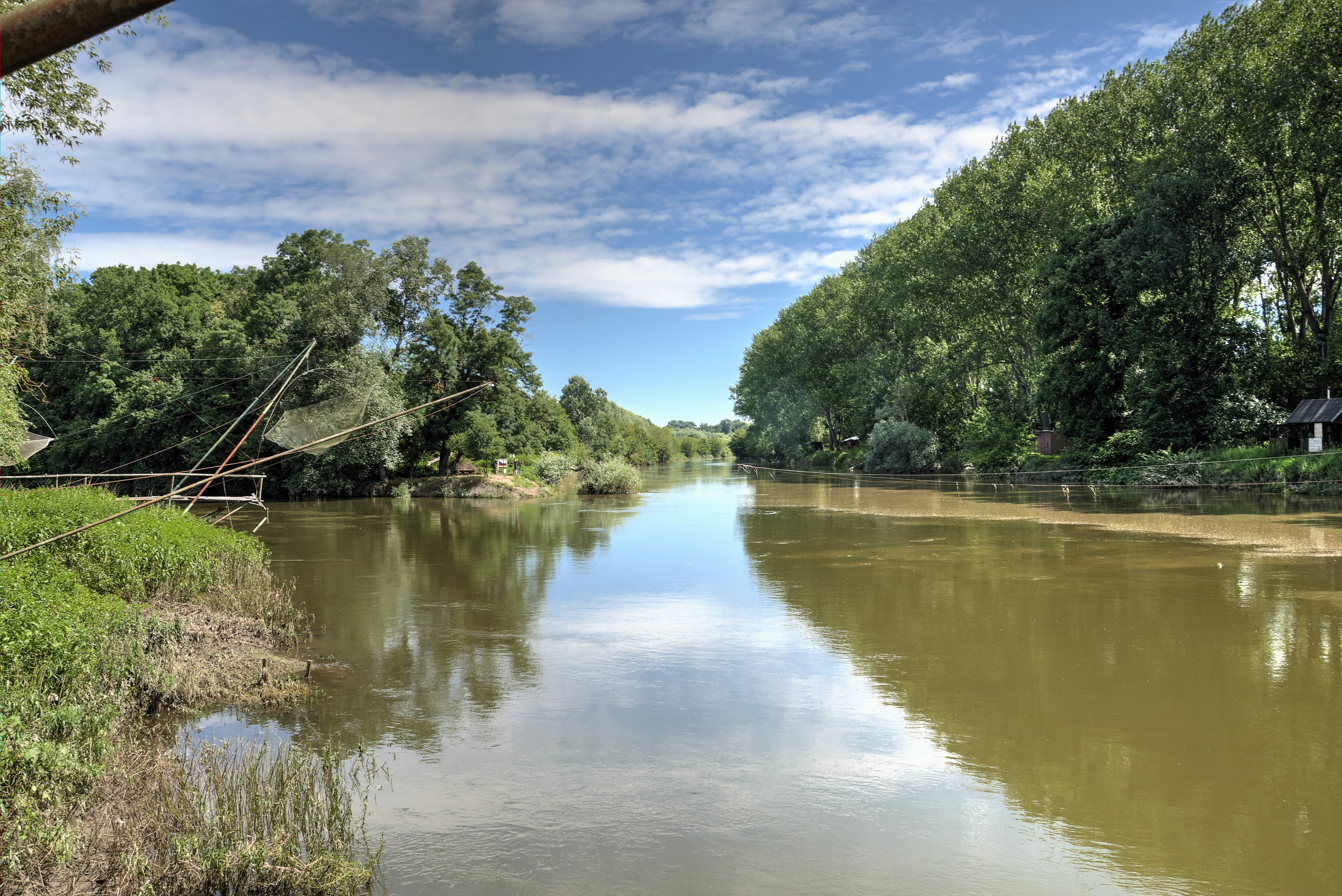
Confluence of the Morava and Thaya on the tripoint of the Czech Republic, Austria and Slovakia

The Morava originates in the territory of Dolní Morava in the Králický Sněžník Mountains, on the slope of the Králický Sněžník mountain at an elevation of 1,371 m (4,498 ft), not far from the border with Poland. The lowlands formed by the river are the Upper Morava Valley and then the Lower Morava Valley in Moravia, the Morava Field or Marchfeld in Lower Austria, and the Záhorie Lowland in Slovakia. The latter three are actually continuous parts of one large basin, forming a major part of the Vienna Basin.

In the Czech Republic, several larger cities and towns lie on the Morava, particularly Olomouc, Kroměříž, Otrokovice, Uherské Hradiště, Veselí nad Moravou and Hodonín. Brno, the second largest city of the Czech Republic, lies within the river basin. As of 2009, the catchment area of the river had a population of c. 3.5 million people. Downstream of Hodonín, the river flows along a sparsely inhabited, forested border area, all the way to its outfall into the Danube, just below Devín Castle on the outskirts of the Slovak capital Bratislava.

The total length of the Morava is 352 km (219 mi), of which 269.4 km (167.4 mi) is in the Czech Republic (including the Czech–Slovak border), making it the third longest river in the Czech Republic. The Morava feeds the Danube with an average discharge rate of 110 m^{3}/s (3,900 cu ft/s), collected from a drainage area of 26,658 km^{2} (10,293 sq mi), of which 20,692.4 km^{2} (7,989.4 sq mi) is in the Czech Republic.

The Morava is a lowland river with a basin that consists of 51% plains; mountains make up only seven percent of the basin while thirty five percent are considered highland. The average slope of the river is 1.8‰ and at the confluence 4‰. The bedrock of the river basin is mostly crystalline bedrock and flysch.

The Morava is unusual in that it is a European blackwater river.

The longest tributary of the Morava is the Thaya, flowing in at the tripoint of the Czech Republic, Austria and Slovakia. The longest tributaries of the Morava are:

Tributary	Length (km)	River km	Side
Thaya	311.0	69.0	right
Bečva	121.0	210.6	left
Myjava	79.0	71.1	left
Zaya	58.0	60.6	right
Haná	57.0	197.5	right
Bystřice	56.1	234.4	left
Moravská Sázava	53.9	292.3	right
Oskava	50.3	239.4	left
Romže	49.6	204.8	right
Třebůvka	48.2	272.9	right
Malina	48.2	10.9	left
Rudava	47.3	51.7	left
Moštěnka	45.6	194.9	left
Blata	45.3	207.7	right
Olšava	44.9	154.8	left
Desná	43.4	301.0	left
Dřevnice	41.6	178.0	left
Velička	40.2	128.7	left

== Ecology ==
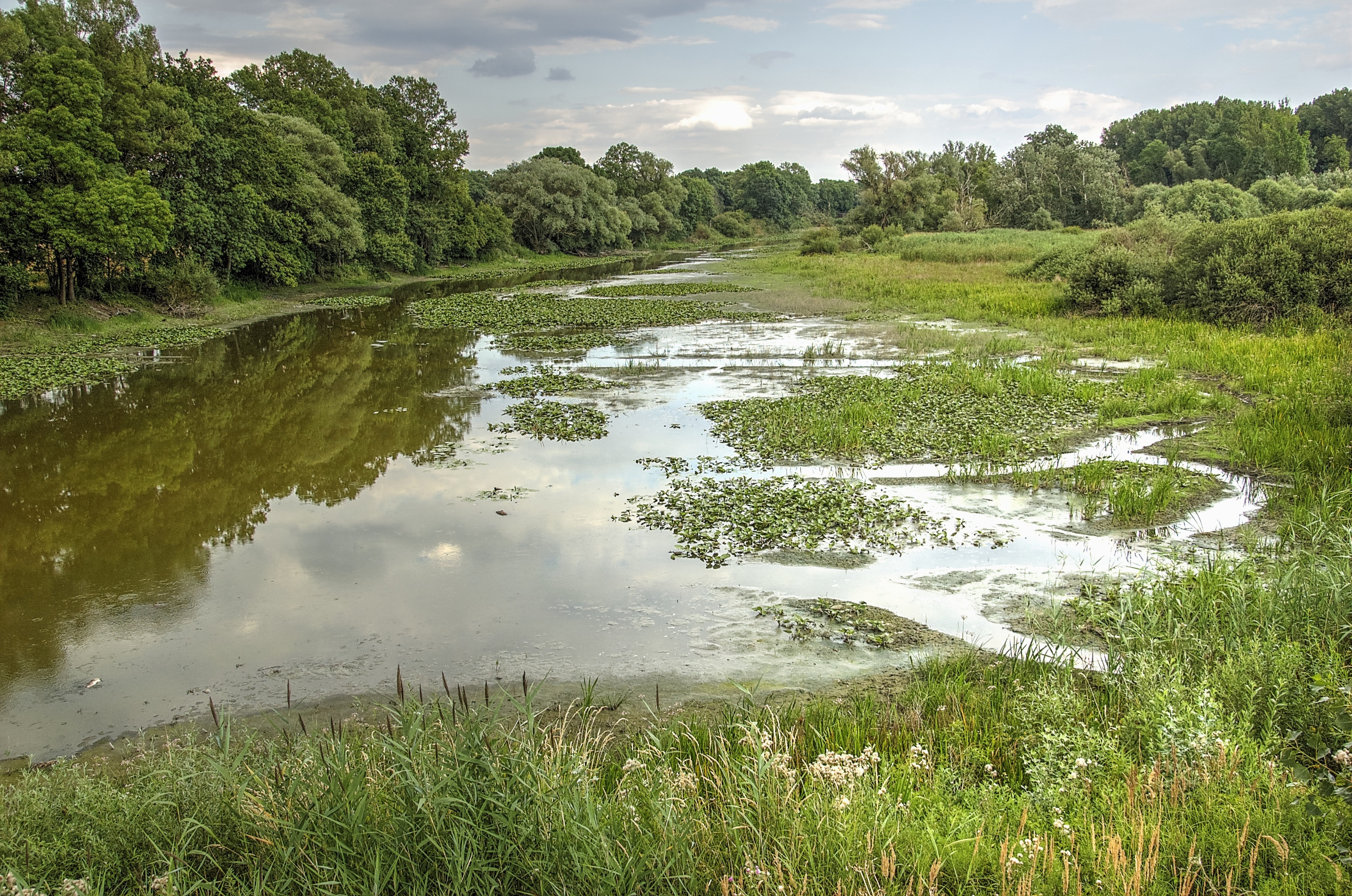
One of many oxbow lakes of the Morava

The Morava River forms an important link between the Danube Valley and the plains of northern Europe, for animals as well as, at least historically, for humans. Its weak slope across flat plains furthermore means that the river is prone to meander and flood, creating vast floodplains. Because of these reasons, the floodplains of the Morava River are among the most biologically diverse ecosystems in Europe. Its richness in plant and animal species (some 12,000 species have been identified) ranks it second in diversity only to the Danube Delta. During the 20th century however, large tracts of the river, especially downstream from Litovel, have been regulated with the ensuing effect of loss of inundation areas (floodplains). Since the river basin is densely populated and, especially the Czech part, industrialised, the river also receives a lot of wastewater. Agriculture also contributes to spreading nitrogen and other nutrients into the river. Nevertheless, the central part of the river has retained much of its natural character and in later years conscious efforts have been made to protect the nature and ecosystem of the river basin.

== See also ==
- March of Austria
- March of Moravia
