= Žákovice =

- Municipality
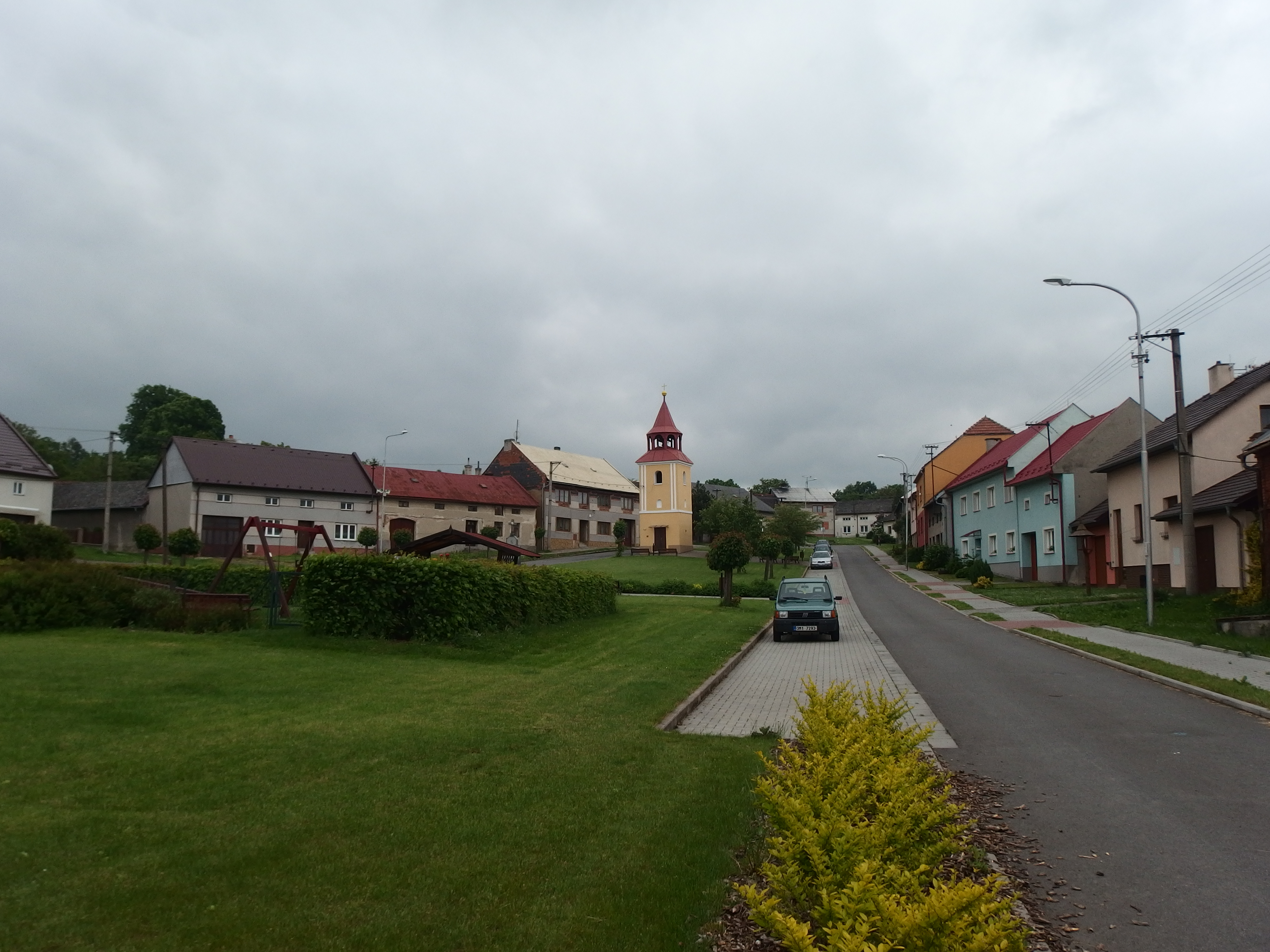
- Centre of Žákovice

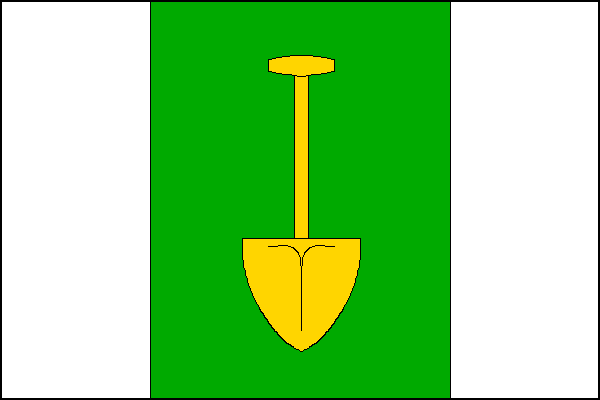
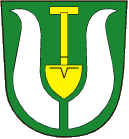
- Flag Coat of arms

- Location in the Czech Republic
- Coordinates: 49°27′15″N 17°39′36″E
- Country: Czech Republic
- Region: Olomouc
- District: Přerov
- First mentioned: 1376

Area
  - Total: 5.59 km^{2} (2.16 sq mi)
- Elevation: 263 m (863 ft)

Population (2026-01-01)
  - Total: 248
  - Density: 44.4/km^{2} (115/sq mi)
- Time zone: UTC+1 (CET)
  - Summer (DST): UTC+2 (CEST)
- Postal code: 753 54
- Website: www.zakovice.cz

Žákovice is a municipality and village in Přerov District in the Olomouc Region of the Czech Republic. It has about 200 inhabitants.

Žákovice lies approximately 15 kilometres (9 mi) east of Přerov, 33 km (21 mi) south-east of Olomouc, and 243 km (151 mi) east of Prague.

== Demographics ==
Historical population
Year	Pop.	±%
1869	334	—
1880	338	+1.2%
1890	340	+0.6%
1900	345	+1.5%
1910	384	+11.3%
1921	406	+5.7%
1930	402	−1.0%
1950	314	−21.9%
1961	339	+8.0%
1970	245	−27.7%
1980	248	+1.2%
1991	218	−12.1%
2001	225	+3.2%
2011	206	−8.4%
2021	239	+16.0%
Source: Censuses
