= Domaželice =

- Municipality
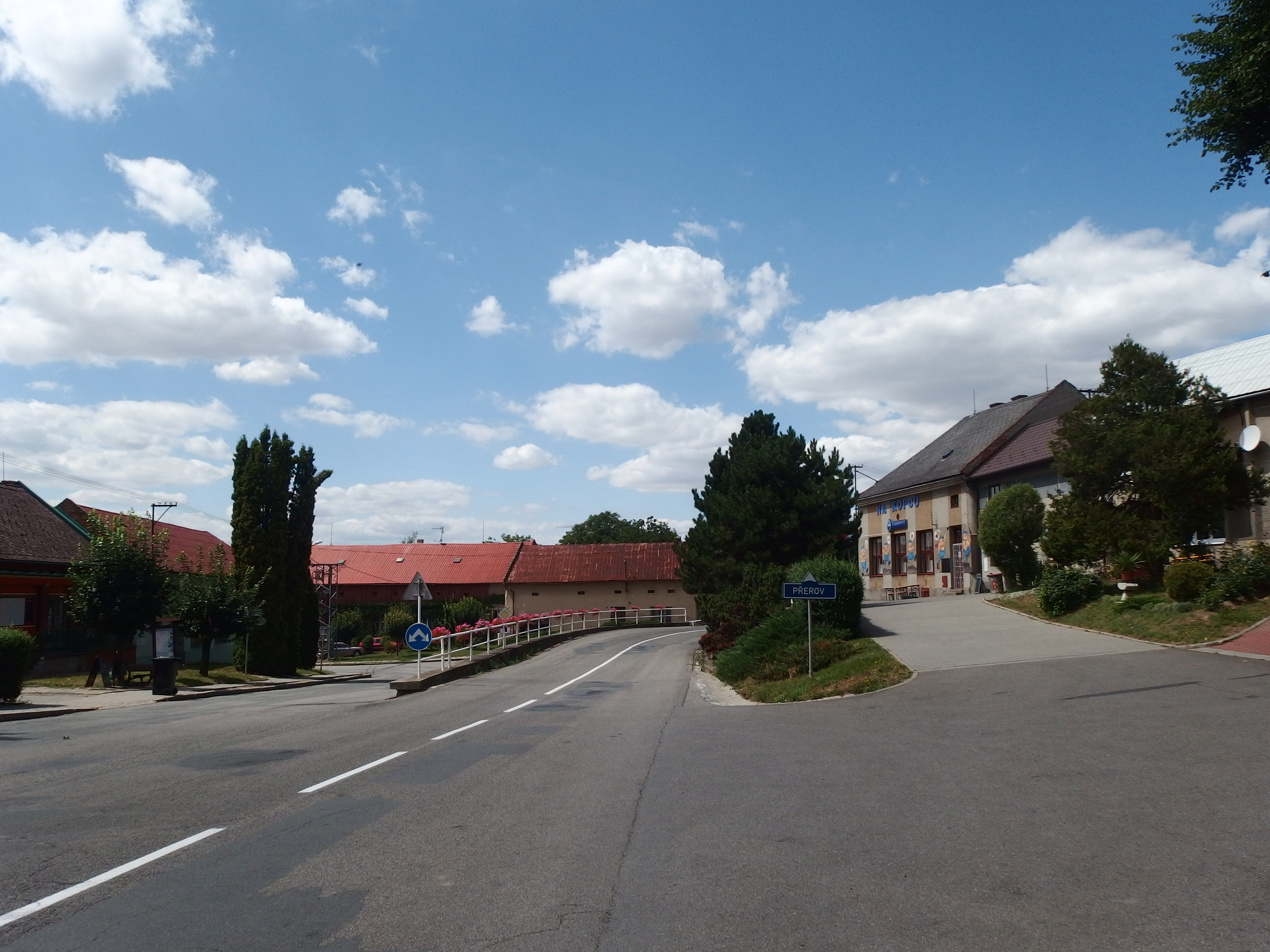
- Centre of Domaželice

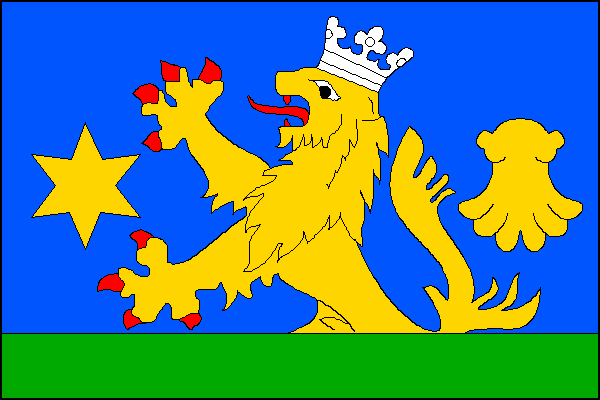
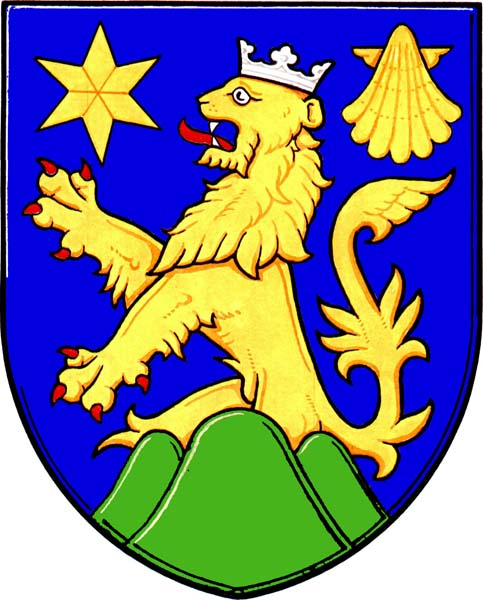
- Flag Coat of arms

- Location in the Czech Republic
- Coordinates: 49°25′40″N 17°32′45″E
- Country: Czech Republic
- Region: Olomouc
- District: Přerov
- First mentioned: 1339

Area
  - Total: 4.27 km^{2} (1.65 sq mi)
- Elevation: 230 m (750 ft)

Population (2026-01-01)
  - Total: 531
  - Density: 124/km^{2} (322/sq mi)
- Time zone: UTC+1 (CET)
  - Summer (DST): UTC+2 (CEST)
- Postal code: 751 15
- Website: www.domazelice.cz

Domaželice is a municipality and village in Přerov District in the Olomouc Region of the Czech Republic. It has about 500 inhabitants.

Domaželice lies approximately 8 kilometres (5 mi) south-east of Přerov, 29 km (18 mi) south-east of Olomouc, and 237 km (147 mi) east of Prague.

== Demographics ==
Historical population
Year	Pop.	±%
1869	382	—
1880	382	+0.0%
1890	446	+16.8%
1900	489	+9.6%
1910	509	+4.1%
1921	541	+6.3%
1930	509	−5.9%
1950	449	−11.8%
1961	496	+10.5%
1970	464	−6.5%
1980	394	−15.1%
1991	387	−1.8%
2001	444	+14.7%
2011	544	+22.5%
2021	502	−7.7%
Source: Censuses
