= Turovice =

- Municipality
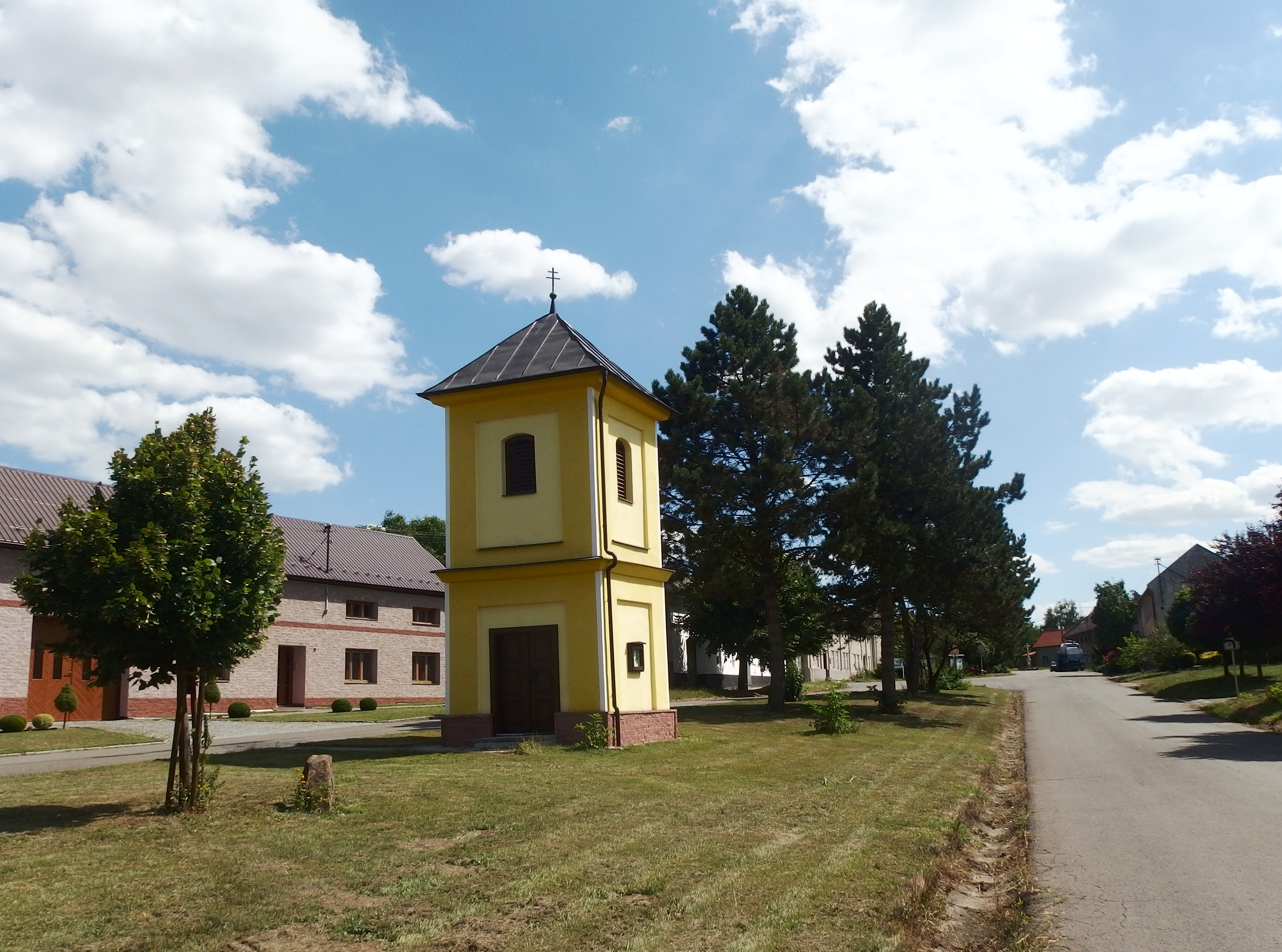
- Centre of Turovice with a chapel

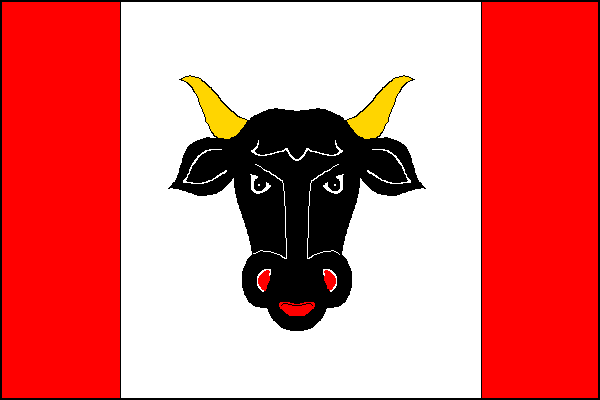
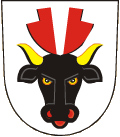
- Flag Coat of arms

- Location in the Czech Republic
- Coordinates: 49°25′25″N 17°34′51″E
- Country: Czech Republic
- Region: Olomouc
- District: Přerov
- First mentioned: 1131

Area
  - Total: 3.63 km^{2} (1.40 sq mi)
- Elevation: 238 m (781 ft)

Population (2026-01-01)
  - Total: 253
  - Density: 69.7/km^{2} (181/sq mi)
- Time zone: UTC+1 (CET)
  - Summer (DST): UTC+2 (CEST)
- Postal code: 751 14
- Website: www.turovice.cz

Turovice is a municipality and village in Přerov District in the Olomouc Region of the Czech Republic. It has about 300 inhabitants.

Turovice lies approximately 10 kilometres (6 mi) south-east of Přerov, 31 km (19 mi) south-east of Olomouc, and 239 km (149 mi) east of Prague.

== History ==
The first written mention of Turovice is from 1131.

== Demographics ==
Historical population
Year	Pop.	±%
1869	300	—
1880	288	−4.0%
1890	309	+7.3%
1900	289	−6.5%
1910	295	+2.1%
1921	312	+5.8%
1930	303	−2.9%
1950	231	−23.8%
1961	266	+15.2%
1970	259	−2.6%
1980	210	−18.9%
1991	222	+5.7%
2001	220	−0.9%
2011	211	−4.1%
2021	208	−1.4%
Source: Censuses
