= Vítonice (Kroměříž District) =

- Municipality
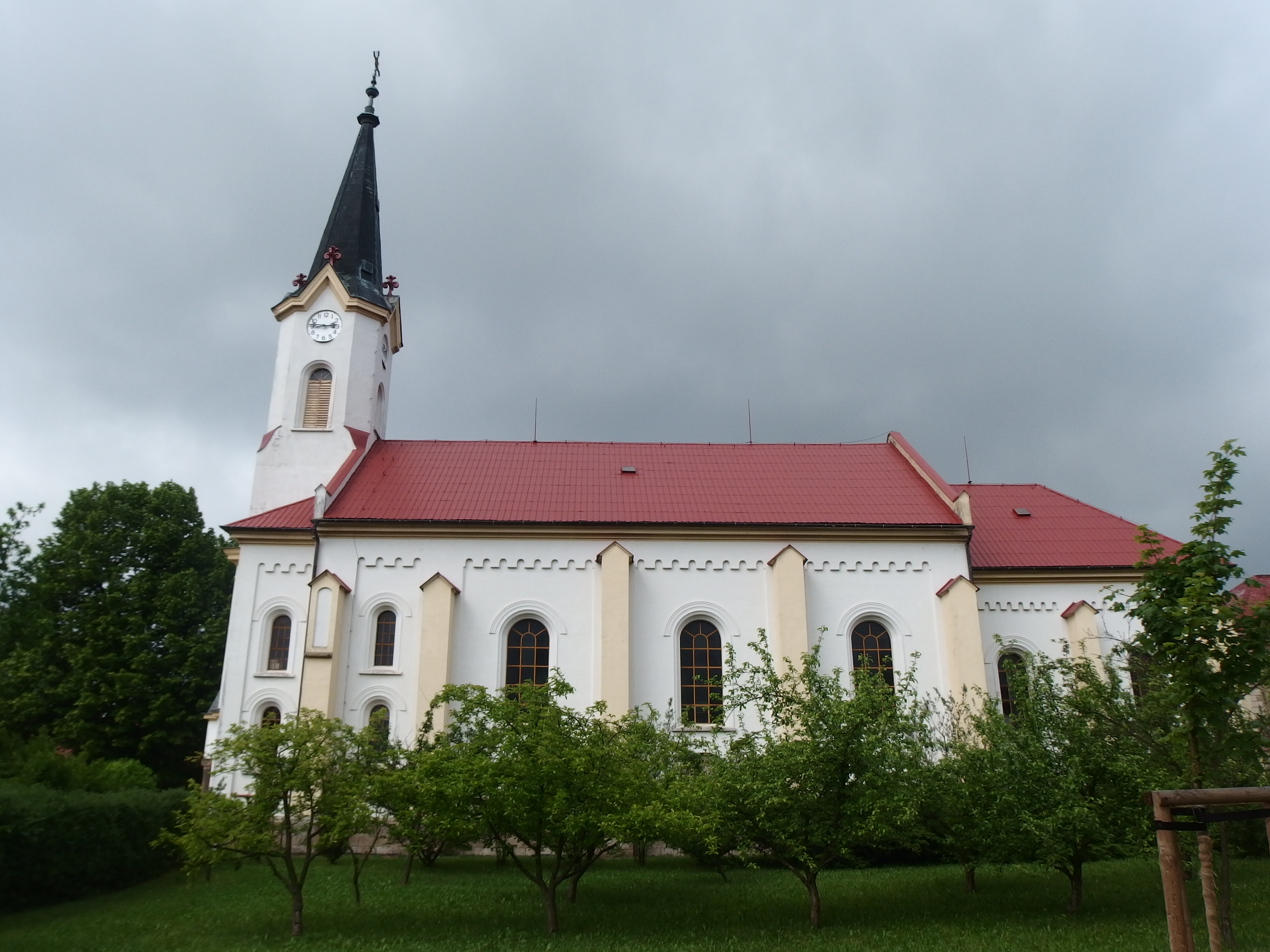
- Church of Saints Cyril and Methodius

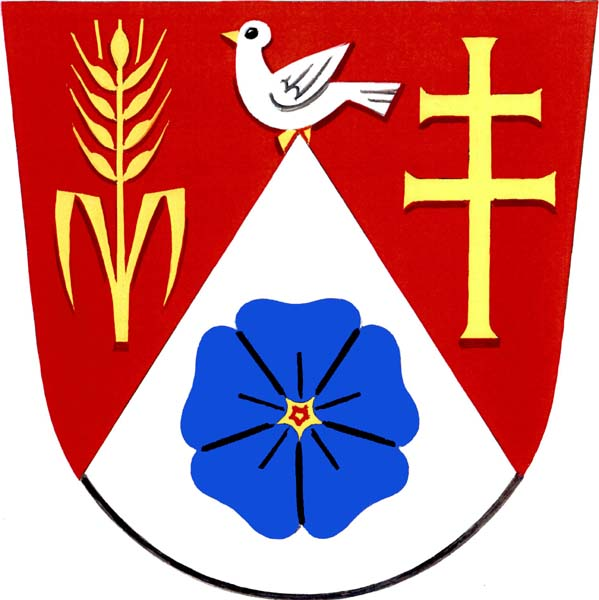
- Flag Coat of arms

- Location in the Czech Republic
- Coordinates: 49°26′50″N 17°41′35″E
- Country: Czech Republic
- Region: Zlín
- District: Kroměříž
- First mentioned: 1141

Area
  - Total: 7.63 km^{2} (2.95 sq mi)
- Elevation: 275 m (902 ft)

Population (2026-01-01)
  - Total: 374
  - Density: 49.0/km^{2} (127/sq mi)
- Time zone: UTC+1 (CET)
  - Summer (DST): UTC+2 (CEST)
- Postal code: 768 61
- Website: www.vitonice.cz

Vítonice is a municipality and village in Kroměříž District in the Zlín Region of the Czech Republic. It has about 400 inhabitants.

Vítonice lies approximately 28 kilometres (17 mi) north-east of Kroměříž, 24 km (15 mi) north of Zlín, and 246 km (153 mi) east of Prague.

== Demographics ==
Historical population
Year	Pop.	±%
1869	501	—
1880	673	+34.3%
1890	592	−12.0%
1900	589	−0.5%
1910	607	+3.1%
1921	610	+0.5%
1930	641	+5.1%
1950	551	−14.0%
1961	605	+9.8%
1970	578	−4.5%
1980	536	−7.3%
1991	496	−7.5%
2001	471	−5.0%
2011	434	−7.9%
2021	386	−11.1%
Source: Censuses
