= Upper Morava Valley =

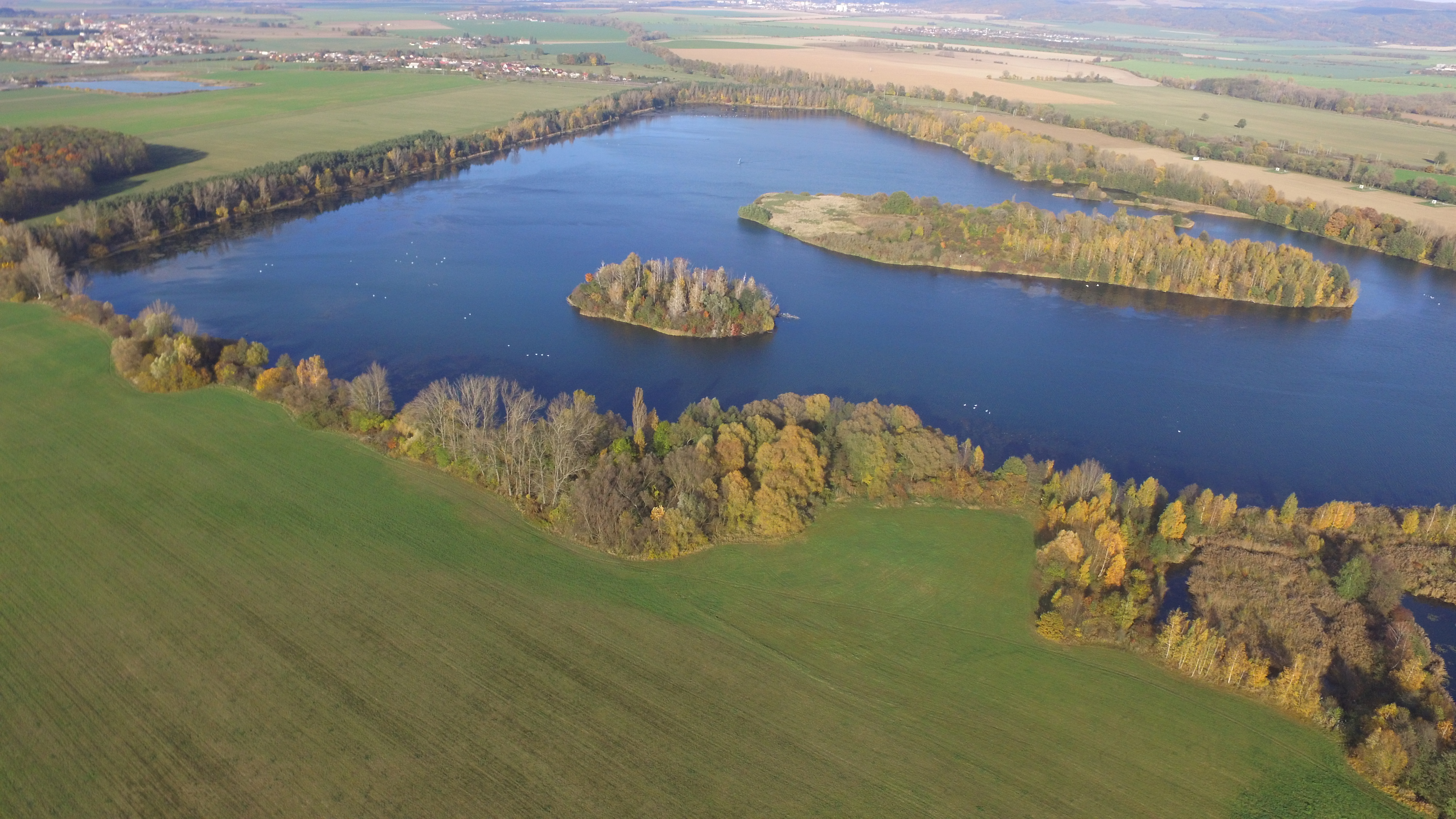
- Chomoutovské Lake

Highest point
- Peak: Horka
- Elevation: 331 m (1,086 ft)

Dimensions
- Length: 80 km (50 mi)
- Area: 1,315 km^{2} (508 mi^{2})

Geography
- Country: Czech Republic
- Regions: Olomouc, Zlín
- Range coordinates: 49°31′N 17°14′E
- Parent range: Western Outer Subcarpathia

Geology
- Rock type(s): Sediment, granite

The Upper Morava Valley (Czech: Hornomoravský úval) is a lowland and a geomorphological mesoregion of the Czech Republic. It is located in the Olomouc and Zlín regions. Its name is derived from the Morava river that forms the axis of the territory.

== Geomorphology ==
The Upper Morava Valley is a mesoregion of the Western Outer Subcarpathia within the Outer Subcarpathia. It is a trench depression, filled with Neogene and Quaternary sediments. The lowland is further subdivided into the microregions of Holešov Plateau, Prostějov Uplands, Central Moravian Floodplain and Uničov Plateau.

The area is poor in peaks. It is the largest real plain in the territory of the Czech Republic, in which the inclination of the slopes consistently does not exceed 1°. The highest peak is Horka (also called Šumvaldská horka) at 331 metres (1,086 ft) above sea level.

== Geography ==
The territory is elongated from north to south. The maximum length is 85 km (53 mi) and the width is almost 30 km (19 mi). The lowland has an area of 1,315 square kilometres (508 sq mi) and an average elevation of 226 metres (741 ft).

The territory is rich in rivers. The axis of the Upper Morava Valley forms the Morava river. Many other rivers flow into it; the most important tributaries within the territory include the Bečva, Romže, Haná and Rusava.

Suitable natural conditions contributed to the creation of many settlements in the Upper Morava Valley. The most populated cities and towns entirely located in the territory are Olomouc, Holešov, Uničov, Litovel, Hulín and Kojetín. Partially located in the territory are Přerov, Kroměříž, Otrokovice and Šternberk.

== Vegetation and land use ==
The lowland is the least forested region of the country. Forest cover is only about 7%. Most of the area is occupied by agricultural land. In the Upper Morava Valley is the informally defined Haná region, which is considered one of the most fertile parts of the Czech Republic.

== Protection of nature ==
Most of the Litovelské Pomoraví Protected Landscape Area lies within the Upper Morava Valley.

== Gallery ==
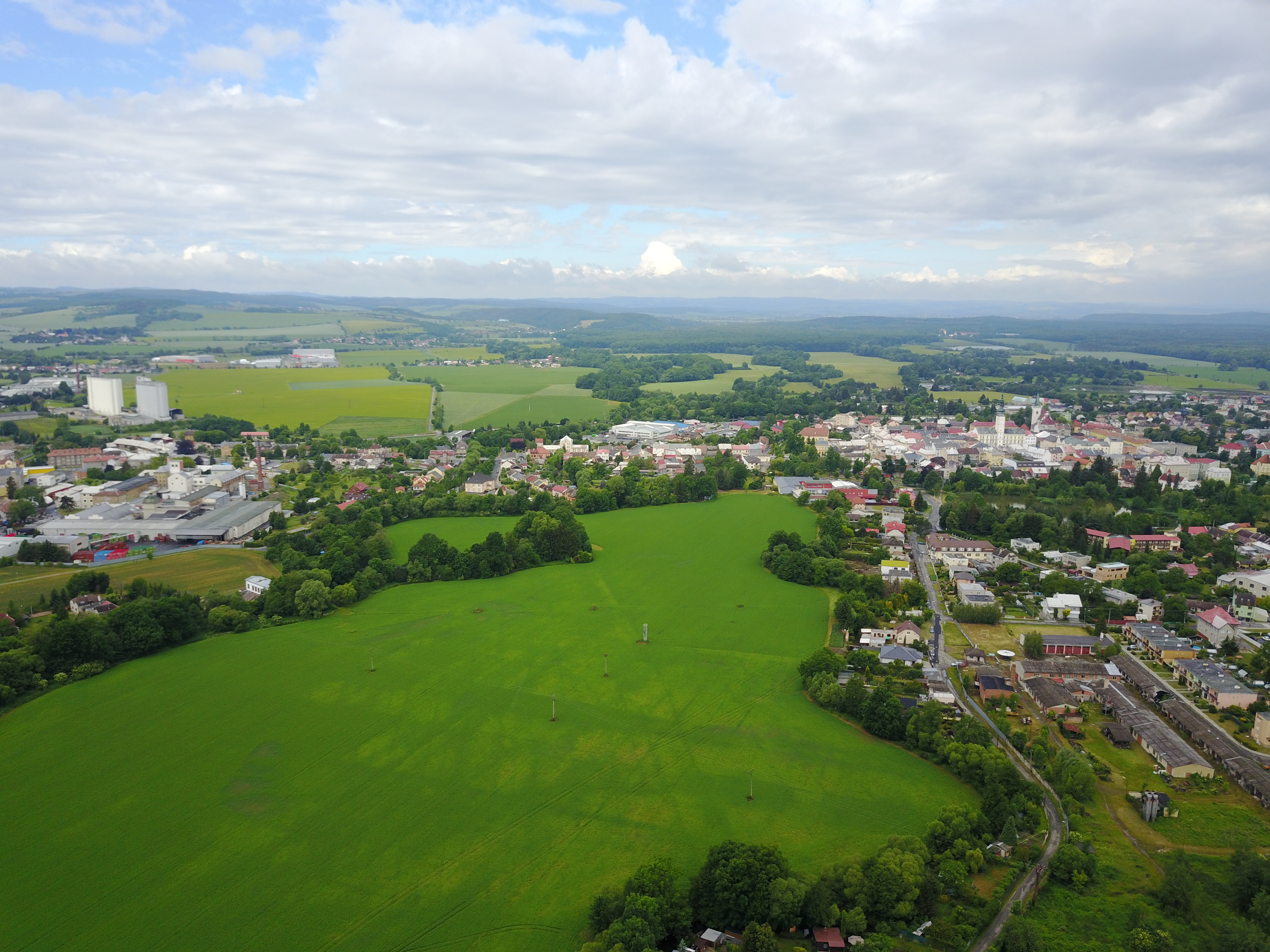
Litovel and surrounding landscape

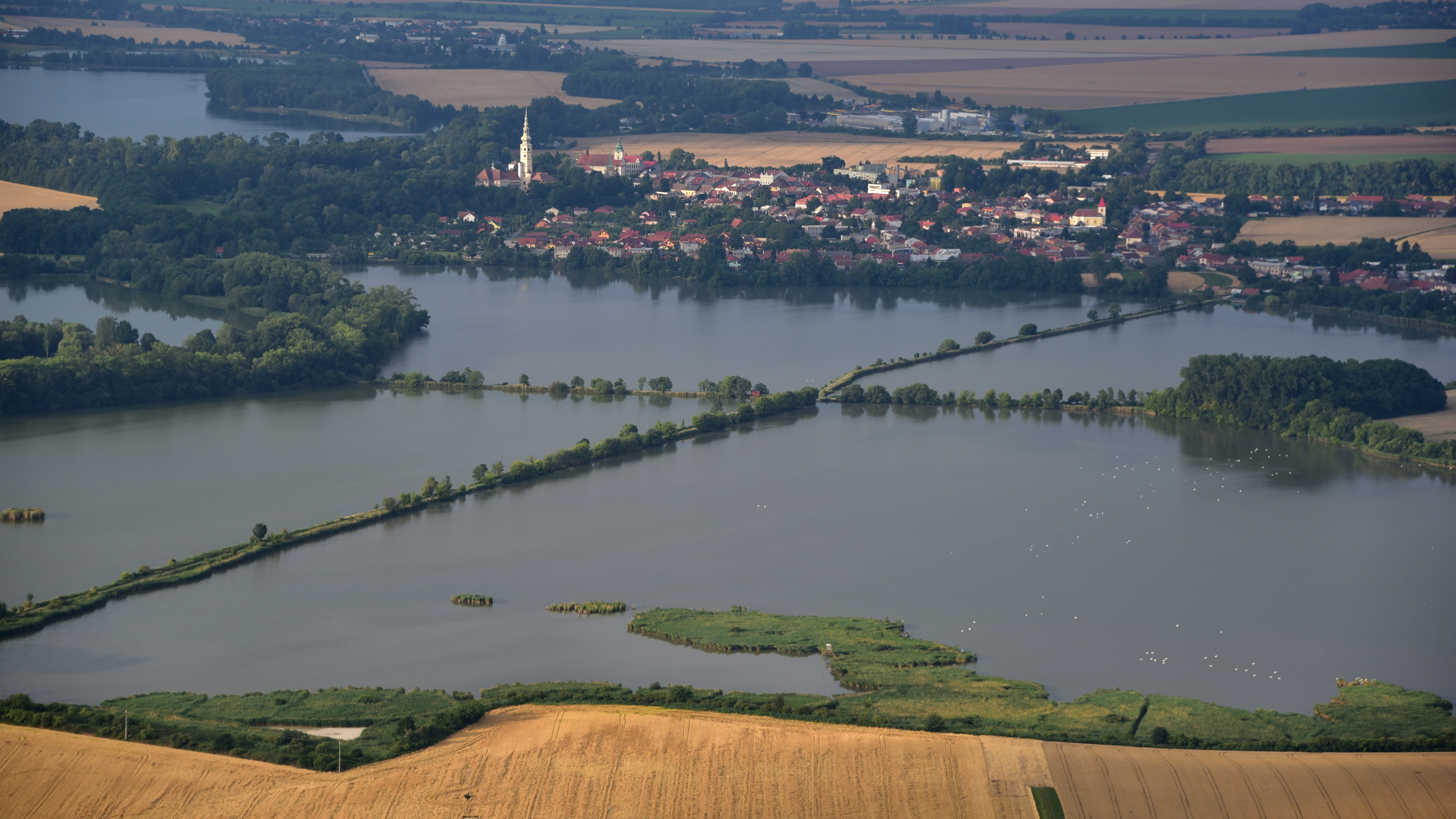
Hradecký Pond and Tovačov

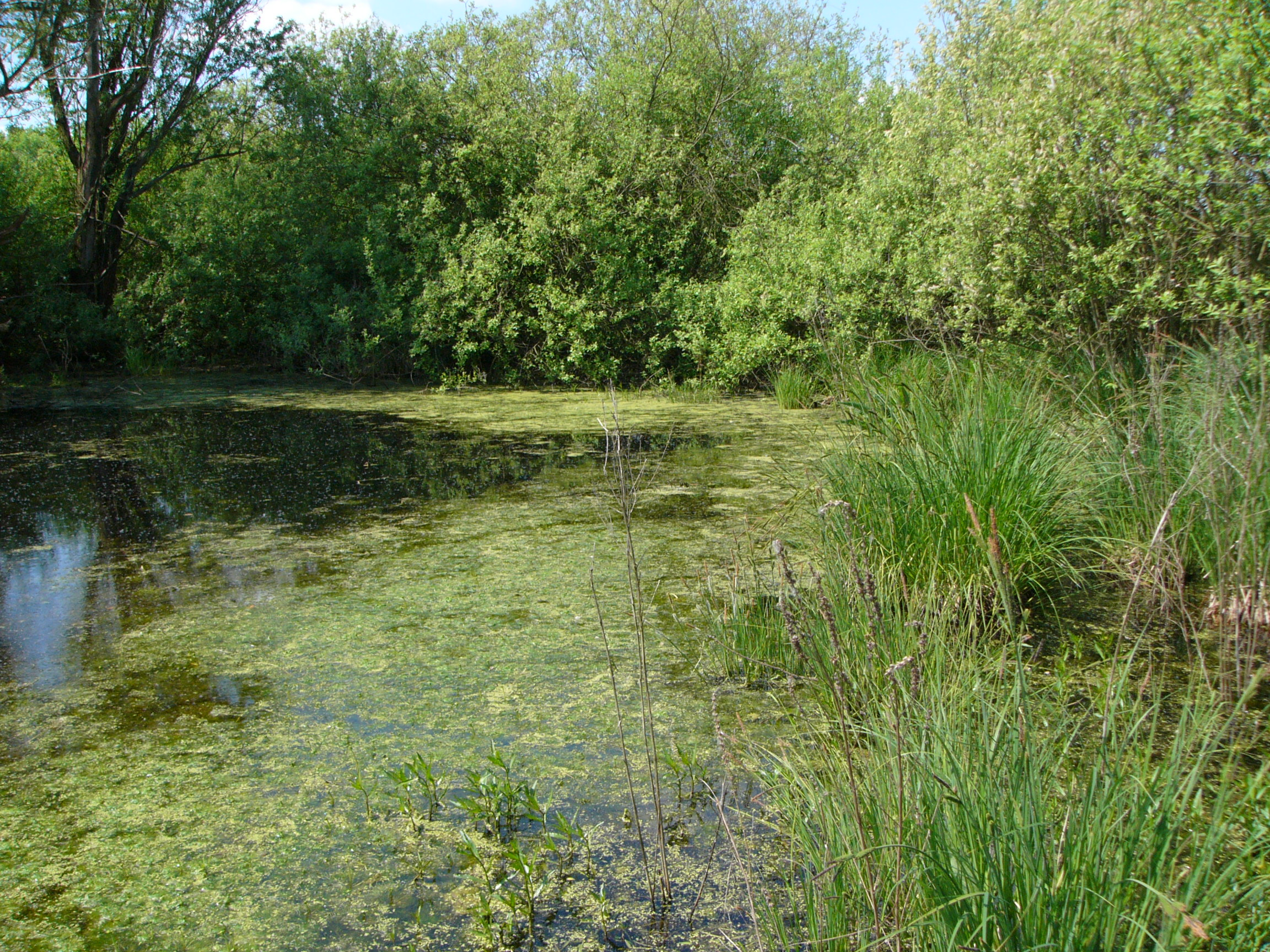
Plané loučky Nature Reserve
