= Kroměříž District =

Kroměříž District Okres Kroměříž
- District
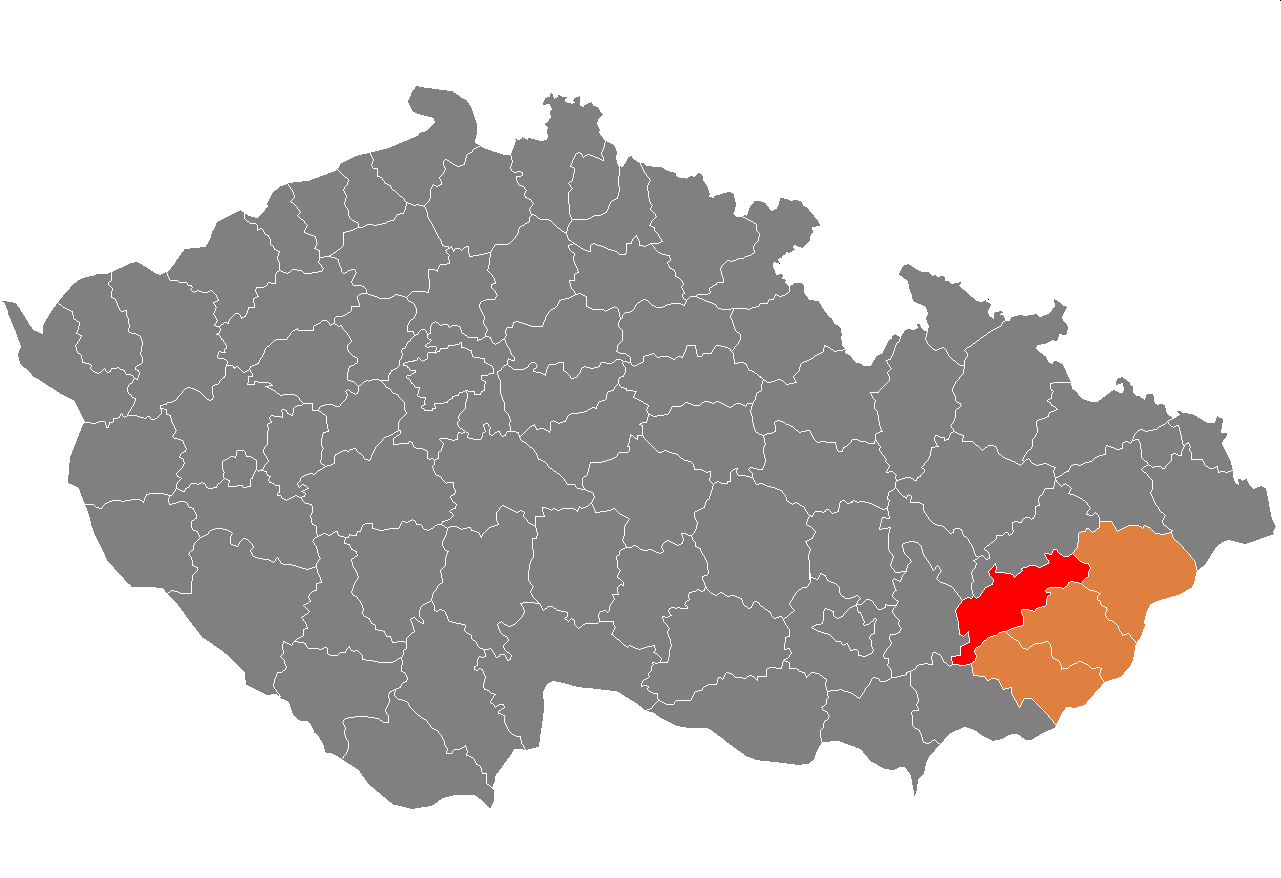
- Location in the Zlín Region within the Czech Republic
- Coordinates: 49°19′N 17°26′E
- Country: Czech Republic
- Region: Zlín
- Capital: Kroměříž

Area
  - Total: 795.54 km^{2} (307.16 sq mi)

Population (2026)
  - Total: 103,787
  - Density: 130.46/km^{2} (337.89/sq mi)
- Time zone: UTC+1 (CET)
  - Summer (DST): UTC+2 (CEST)
- Municipalities: 79
- * Towns: 7
- * Market towns: 1

Kroměříž District (Czech: okres Kroměříž) is a district in the Zlín Region of the Czech Republic. Its capital is the town of Kroměříž.

== Administrative division ==
Kroměříž District is divided into three administrative districts of municipalities with extended competence: Kroměříž, Bystřice pod Hostýnem and Holešov.

=== List of municipalities ===
Towns are marked in bold and market towns in italics:

Bařice-Velké Těšany - Bezměrov - Blazice - Bořenovice - Brusné - Břest - Bystřice pod Hostýnem - Cetechovice - Chomýž - Chropyně - Chvalčov - Chvalnov-Lísky - Dřínov - Holešov - Honětice - Horní Lapač - Hoštice - Hulín - Jankovice - Jarohněvice - Karolín - Komárno - Koryčany - Kostelany - Kostelec u Holešova - Kroměříž - Kunkovice - Kurovice - Kvasice - Kyselovice - Lechotice - Litenčice - Loukov - Lubná - Ludslavice - Lutopecny - Martinice - Míškovice - Morkovice-Slížany - Mrlínek - Němčice - Nítkovice - Nová Dědina - Osíčko - Pacetluky - Pačlavice - Počenice-Tetětice - Podhradní Lhota - Prasklice - Pravčice - Prusinovice - Přílepy - Rajnochovice - Rataje - Roštění - Roštín - Rusava - Rymice - Šelešovice - Skaštice - Slavkov pod Hostýnem - Soběsuky - Střílky - Střížovice - Sulimov - Troubky-Zdislavice - Třebětice - Uhřice - Věžky - Vítonice - Vrbka - Zahnašovice - Žalkovice - Záříčí - Zástřizly - Zborovice - Zdounky - Žeranovice - Zlobice

== Geography ==
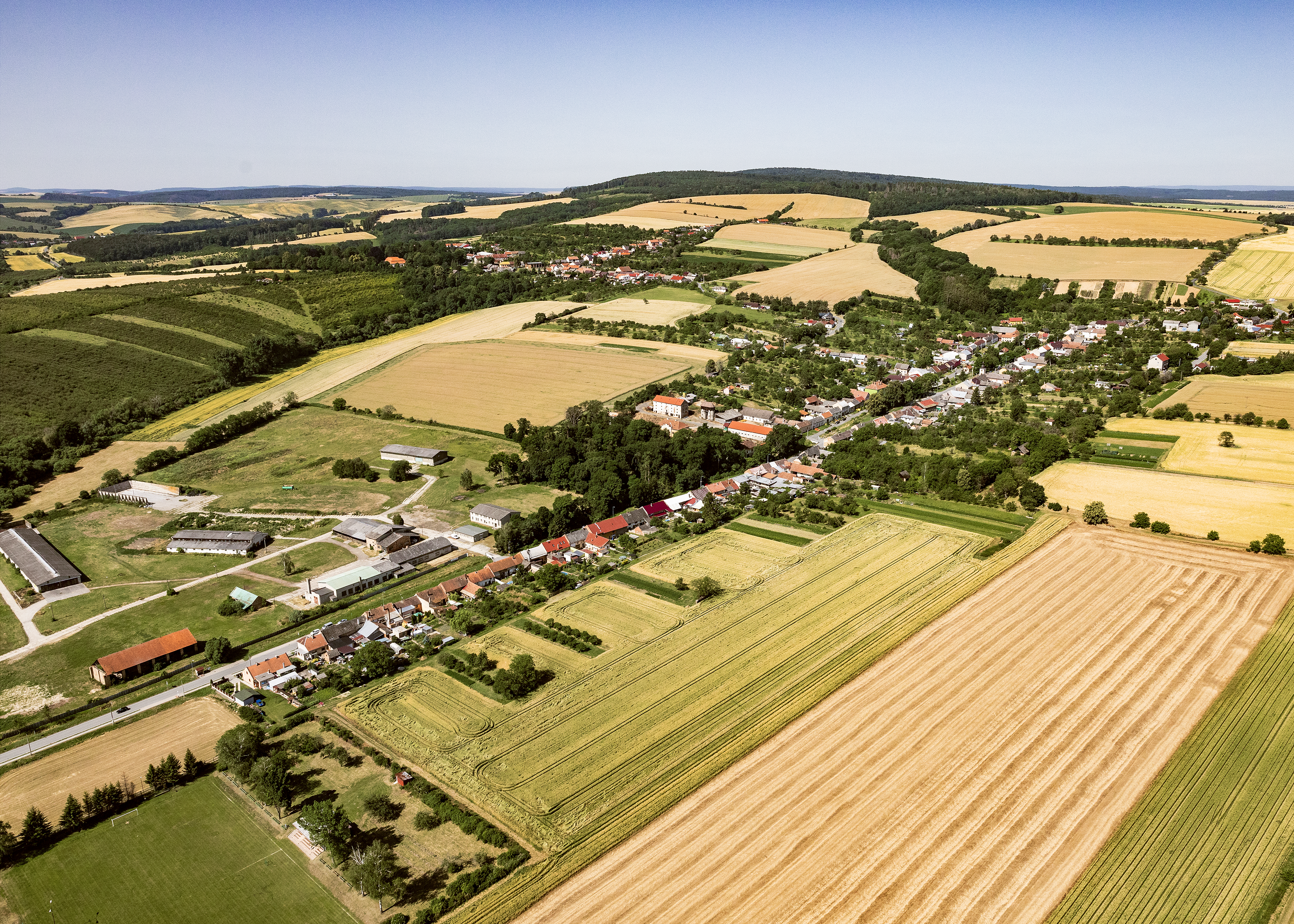
Troubky-Zdislavice and surrounding landscape

The terrain is varied, the fertile plain in the centre of the territory turns into highlands and low mountain ranges on its edges. The territory extends into six geomorphological mesoregions: Upper Morava Valley (north and centre), Chřiby (southwest), Moravian-Silesian Foothills (northeast), Hostýn-Vsetín Mountains (southeast), Litenčice Hills (west) and Vizovice Highlands (small part in the south). The highest point of the district is the mountain Kelčský Javorník in Rajnochovice with an elevation of 864 m (2,835 ft), the lowest point is the river bed of the Morava in Kvasice at 184 m (604 ft).

From the total district area of 795.5 km^{2} (307.1 sq mi), agricultural land occupies 478.9 km^{2} (184.9 sq mi), forests occupy 218.5 km^{2} (84.4 sq mi), and water area occupies 12.4 km^{2} (4.8 sq mi). Forests cover 27.5% of the district's area.

The most important river is the Morava, which crosses the territory in its centre. With the exception of the centre of the territory, the district is poor in bodies of water.

There are no large-scale protected areas.

== Demographics ==
Historical population

Year	Pop.	±%
1869	77,480	—
1880	87,269	+12.6%
1890	92,252	+5.7%
1900	97,045	+5.2%
1910	104,878	+8.1%

Year	Pop.	±%
1921	104,365	−0.5%
1930	106,224	+1.8%
1950	99,285	−6.5%
1961	105,913	+6.7%
1970	104,189	−1.6%

Year	Pop.	±%
1980	108,901	+4.5%
1991	107,746	−1.1%
2001	107,811	+0.1%
2011	105,569	−2.1%
2021	102,140	−3.2%

Source: Censuses

=== Most populous municipalities ===
Name	Population	Area (km^{2})
Kroměříž	27,781	51
Holešov	11,544	34
Bystřice pod Hostýnem	7,911	27
Hulín	6,377	32
Chropyně	4,582	19
Morkovice-Slížany	2,998	21
Koryčany	2,744	41
Kvasice	2,196	11
Zdounky	2,082	27
Chvalčov	1,597	23

== Economy ==
The largest employers with headquarters in Kroměříž District and at least 500 employees are:

Economic entity	Location	Number of employees	Main activity
Kroměříž Hospital	Kroměříž	1,000–1,599	Health care
ROSA market	Kroměříž	1,000–1,599	Retail trade
Chropyňská strojírna	Chropyně	500–999	Installation of industrial machinery
Psychiatric Hospital in Kroměříž	Kroměříž	500–999	Health care
Sociální služby města Kroměříže	Kroměříž	500–999	Social work

A notable industrial company is also TON in Bystřice pod Hostýnem, a manufacturer of furniture with 250–499 employees.

== Transport ==
The D1 motorway from Brno to Ostrava runs through the district. The D55 motorway separates from it and leads to Otrokovice.

== Sights ==
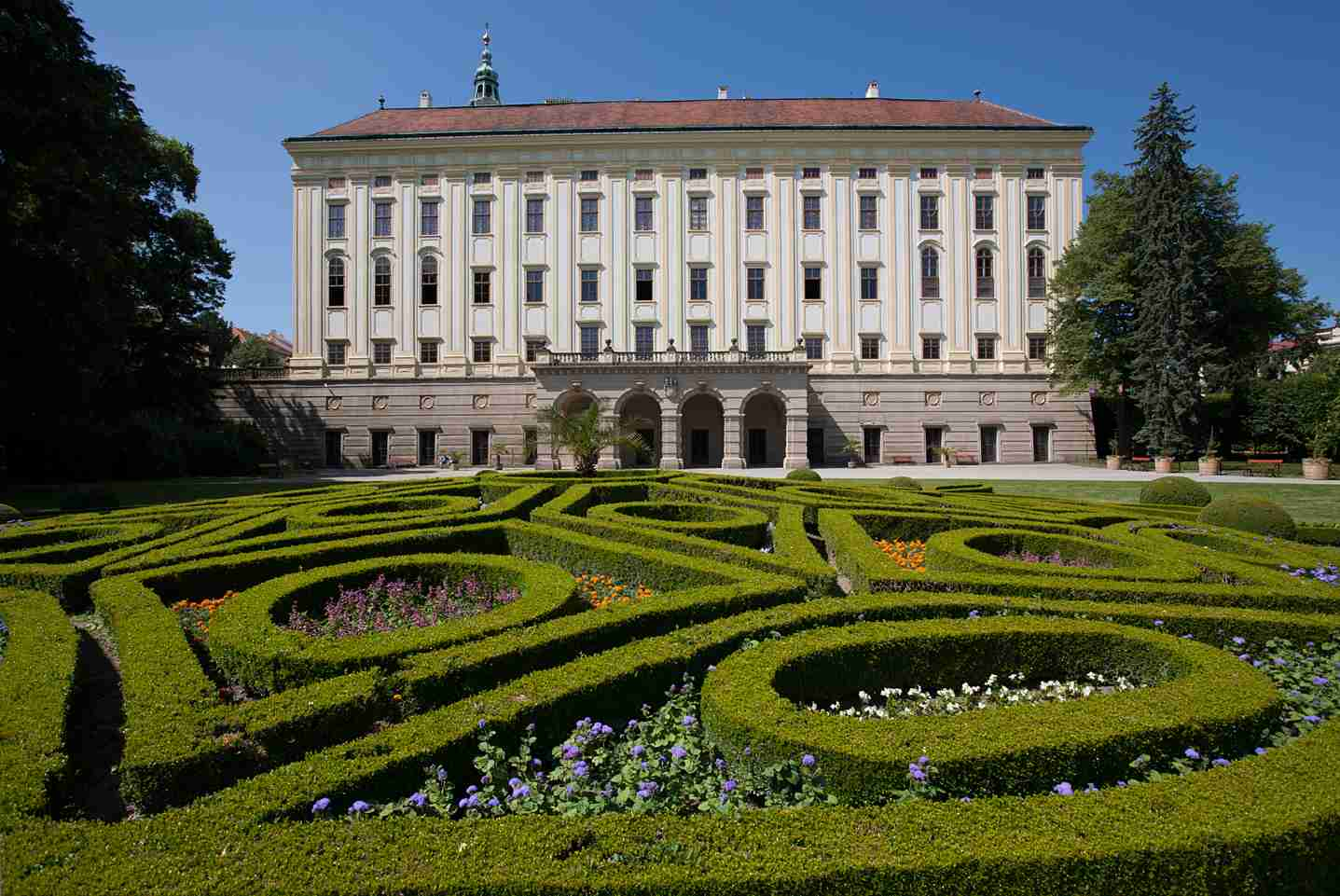
Kroměříž Castle and gardens

The gardens and castle at Kroměříž were designated a UNESCO World Heritage Site in 1998 because it is an exceptionally complete and well-preserved Baroque residence.

The most important monuments in the district, protected as national cultural monuments, are:

- Kroměříž Castle with the castle gardens
- Baroque cemetery in Střílky
- Windmill in Bařice-Velké Těšany
- Pilgrimage complex Saint Hostýn with the Basilica of the Assumption of the Virgin Mary

The best-preserved settlements, protected as monument reservations and monument zones, are:

- Kroměříž (monument reservation)
- Rymice-Hejnice (monument reservation)
- Holešov

The most visited tourist destination are the Kroměříž Castle and Flower Garden Kroměříž.
