= Brusné =

- Municipality
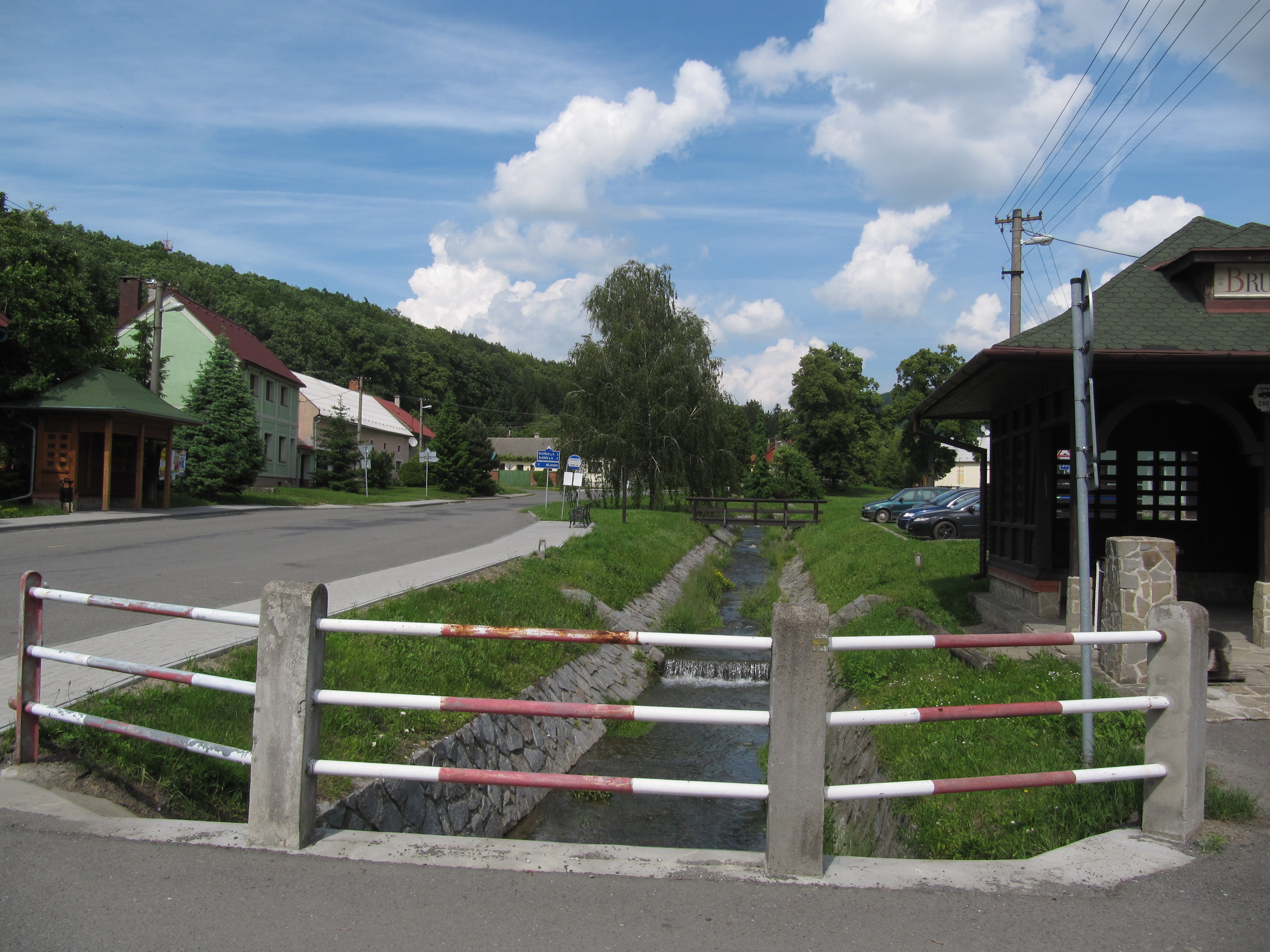
- Centre of Brusné

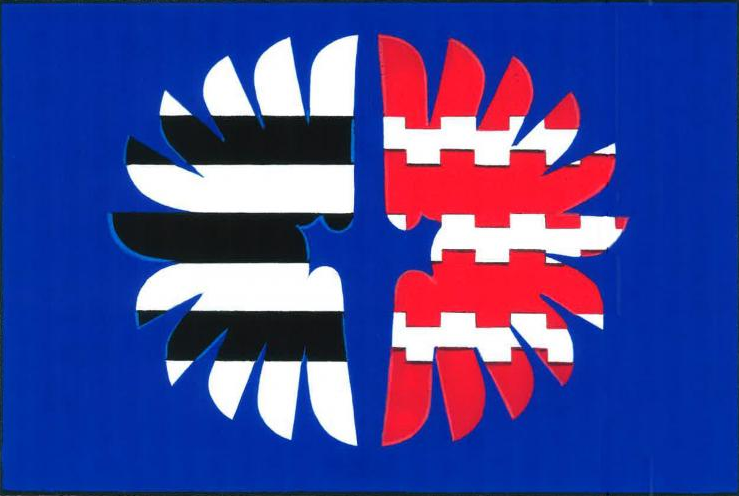
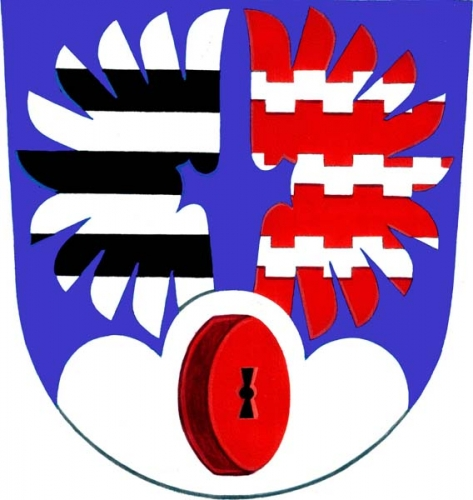
- Flag Coat of arms

- Location in the Czech Republic
- Coordinates: 49°21′48″N 17°39′39″E
- Country: Czech Republic
- Region: Zlín
- District: Kroměříž
- First mentioned: 1358

Area
  - Total: 8.17 km^{2} (3.15 sq mi)
- Elevation: 323 m (1,060 ft)

Population (2026-01-01)
  - Total: 392
  - Density: 48.0/km^{2} (124/sq mi)
- Time zone: UTC+1 (CET)
  - Summer (DST): UTC+2 (CEST)
- Postal code: 768 61
- Website: www.brusne.cz

Brusné is a municipality and village in Kroměříž District in the Zlín Region of the Czech Republic. It has about 400 inhabitants.

Brusné lies approximately 22 kilometres (14 mi) east of Kroměříž, 14 km (9 mi) north of Zlín, and 248 km (154 mi) east of Prague.

== Demographics ==
Historical population
Year	Pop.	±%
1869	285	—
1880	296	+3.9%
1890	354	+19.6%
1900	386	+9.0%
1910	359	−7.0%
1921	355	−1.1%
1930	388	+9.3%
1950	411	+5.9%
1961	449	+9.2%
1970	385	−14.3%
1980	410	+6.5%
1991	377	−8.0%
2001	363	−3.7%
2011	357	−1.7%
2021	330	−7.6%
Source: Censuses
