= Třebětice (Kroměříž District) =

- Municipality
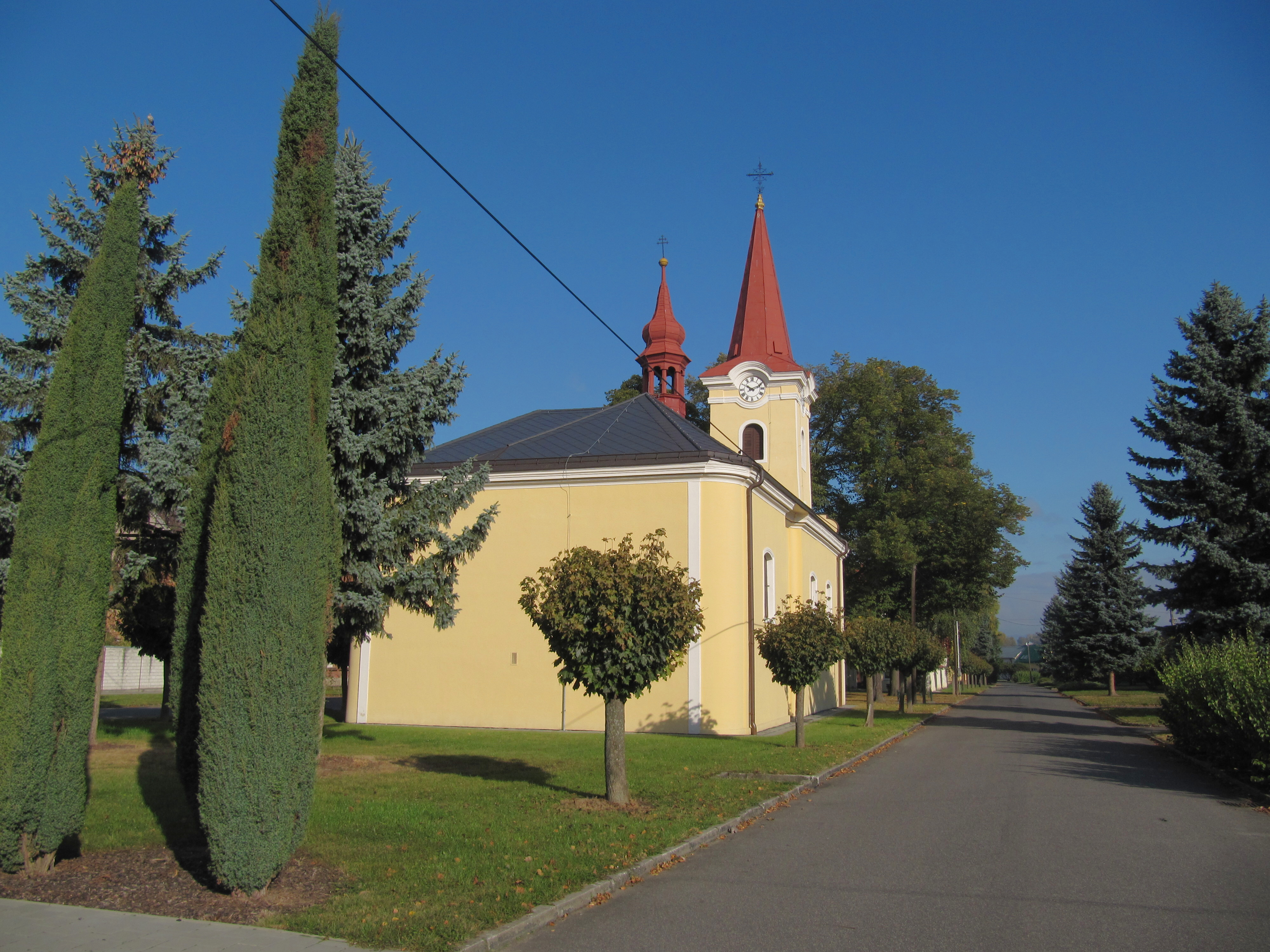
- Church of Saint Wendelin

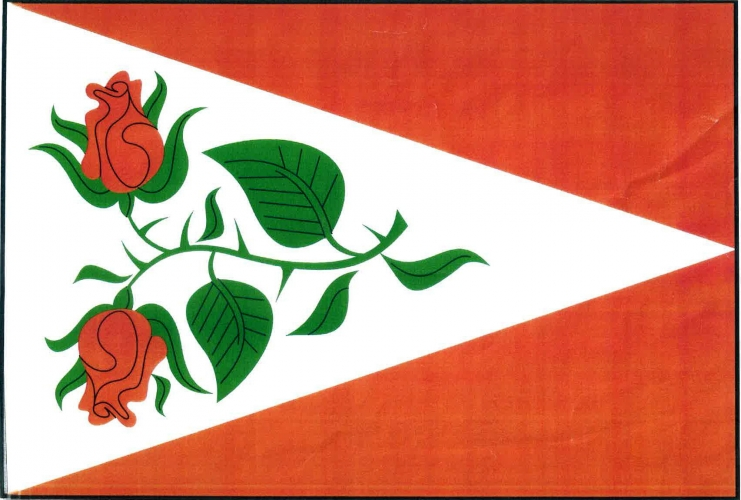
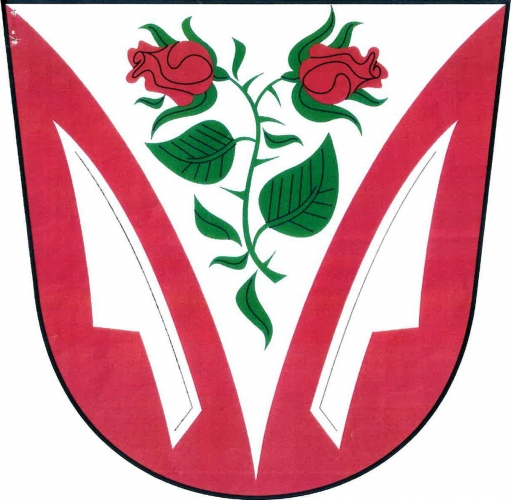
- Flag Coat of arms

- Location in the Czech Republic
- Coordinates: 49°19′10″N 17°31′9″E
- Country: Czech Republic
- Region: Zlín
- District: Kroměříž
- First mentioned: 1339

Area
  - Total: 6.02 km^{2} (2.32 sq mi)
- Elevation: 204 m (669 ft)

Population (2026-01-01)
  - Total: 283
  - Density: 47.0/km^{2} (122/sq mi)
- Time zone: UTC+1 (CET)
  - Summer (DST): UTC+2 (CEST)
- Postal code: 769 01
- Website: www.trebetice.cz

Třebětice is a municipality and village in Kroměříž District in the Zlín Region of the Czech Republic. It has about 300 inhabitants.

Třebětice lies approximately 10 kilometres (6 mi) east of Kroměříž, 14 km (9 mi) north-west of Zlín, and 240 km (150 mi) east of Prague.

== Demographics ==
Historical population
Year	Pop.	±%
1869	356	—
1880	385	+8.1%
1890	401	+4.2%
1900	418	+4.2%
1910	446	+6.7%
1921	455	+2.0%
1930	431	−5.3%
1950	354	−17.9%
1961	375	+5.9%
1970	360	−4.0%
1980	314	−12.8%
1991	273	−13.1%
2001	271	−0.7%
2011	273	+0.7%
2021	256	−6.2%
Source: Censuses
