= Komárno (Kroměříž District) =

- Municipality
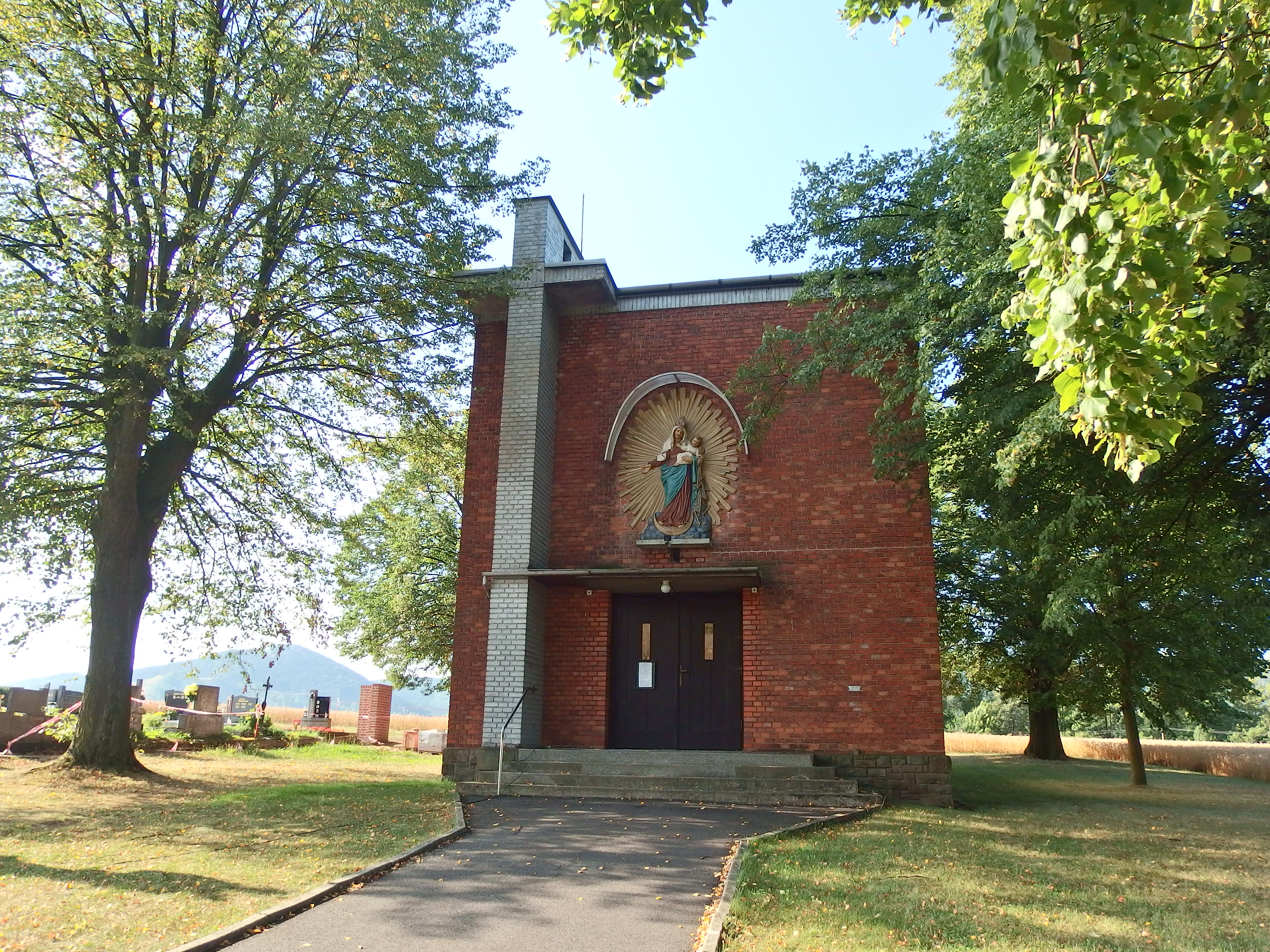
- Chapel of Saints Cyril and Methodius

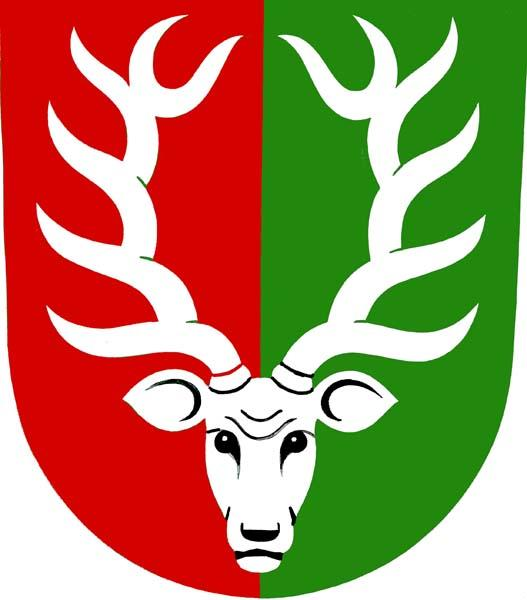
- Flag Coat of arms

- Location in the Czech Republic
- Coordinates: 49°26′4″N 17°46′49″E
- Country: Czech Republic
- Region: Zlín
- District: Kroměříž
- First mentioned: 1272

Area
  - Total: 1.98 km^{2} (0.76 sq mi)
- Elevation: 368 m (1,207 ft)

Population (2026-01-01)
  - Total: 254
  - Density: 128/km^{2} (332/sq mi)
- Time zone: UTC+1 (CET)
  - Summer (DST): UTC+2 (CEST)
- Postal code: 768 71
- Website: www.komarno.cz

Komárno is a municipality and village in Kroměříž District in the Zlín Region of the Czech Republic. It has about 300 inhabitants.

Komárno lies approximately 32 kilometres (20 mi) north-east of Kroměříž, 24 km (15 mi) north of Zlín, and 253 km (157 mi) east of Prague.

== Demographics ==
Historical population
Year	Pop.	±%
1869	426	—
1880	430	+0.9%
1890	448	+4.2%
1900	436	−2.7%
1910	464	+6.4%
1921	462	−0.4%
1930	496	+7.4%
1950	431	−13.1%
1961	440	+2.1%
1970	424	−3.6%
1980	378	−10.8%
1991	332	−12.2%
2001	325	−2.1%
2011	309	−4.9%
2021	270	−12.6%
Source: Censuses
