= Horní Lapač =

- Municipality
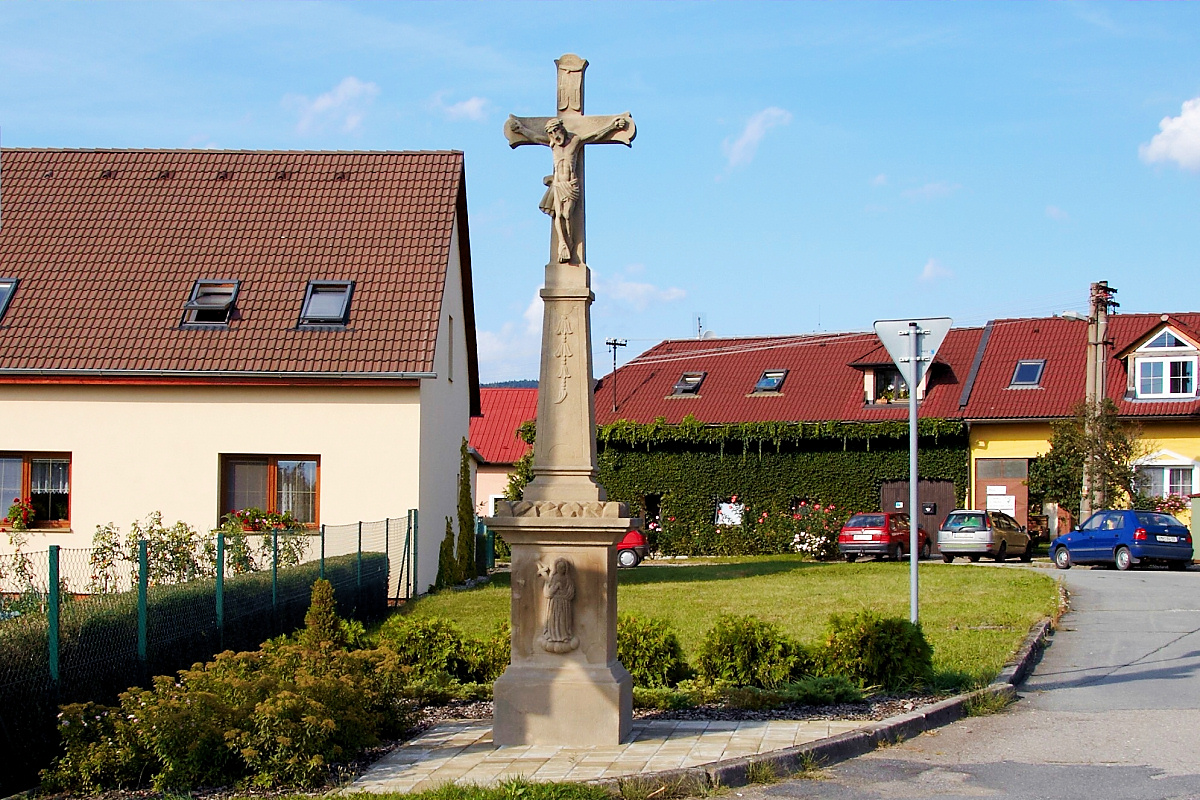
- Stone cross

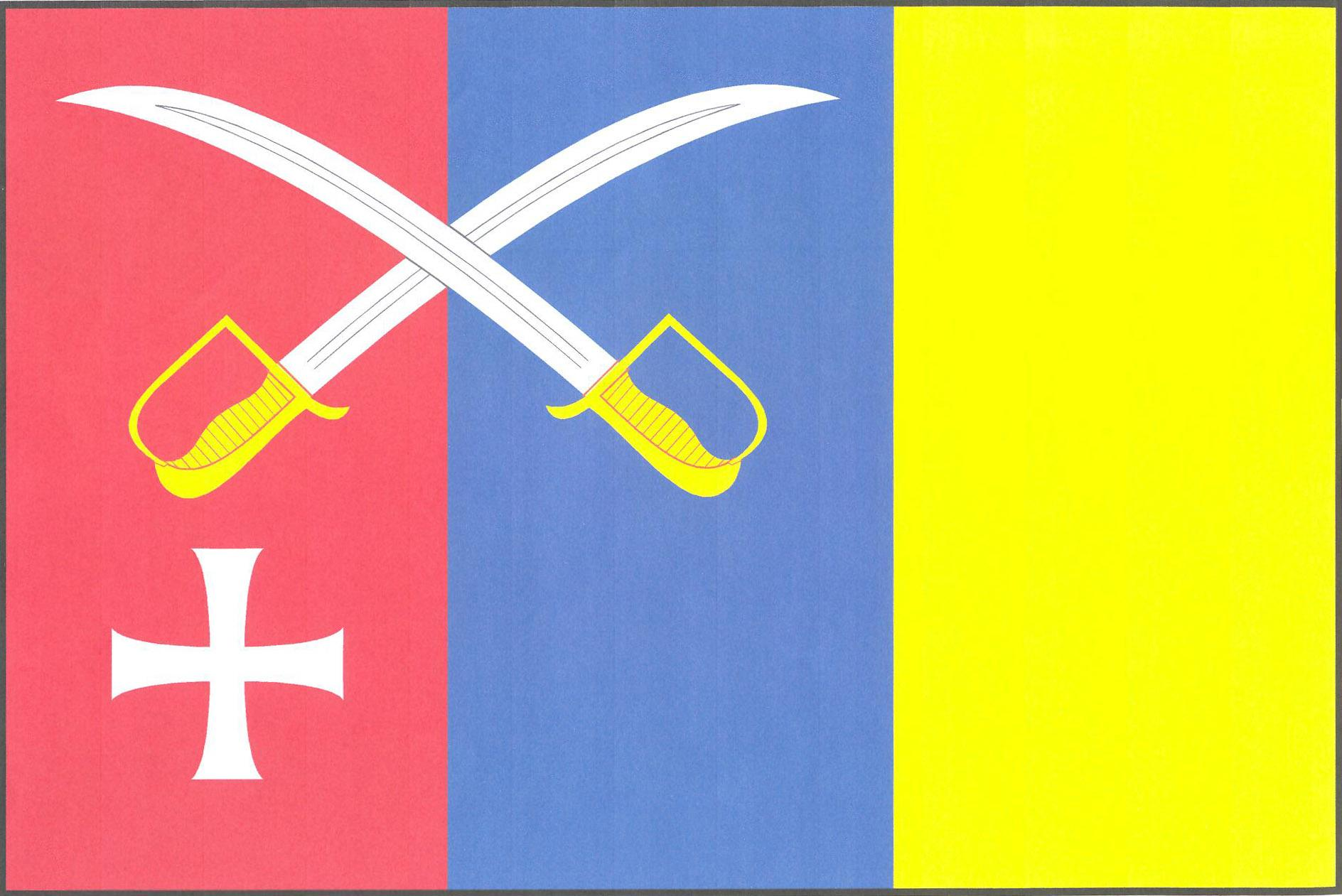
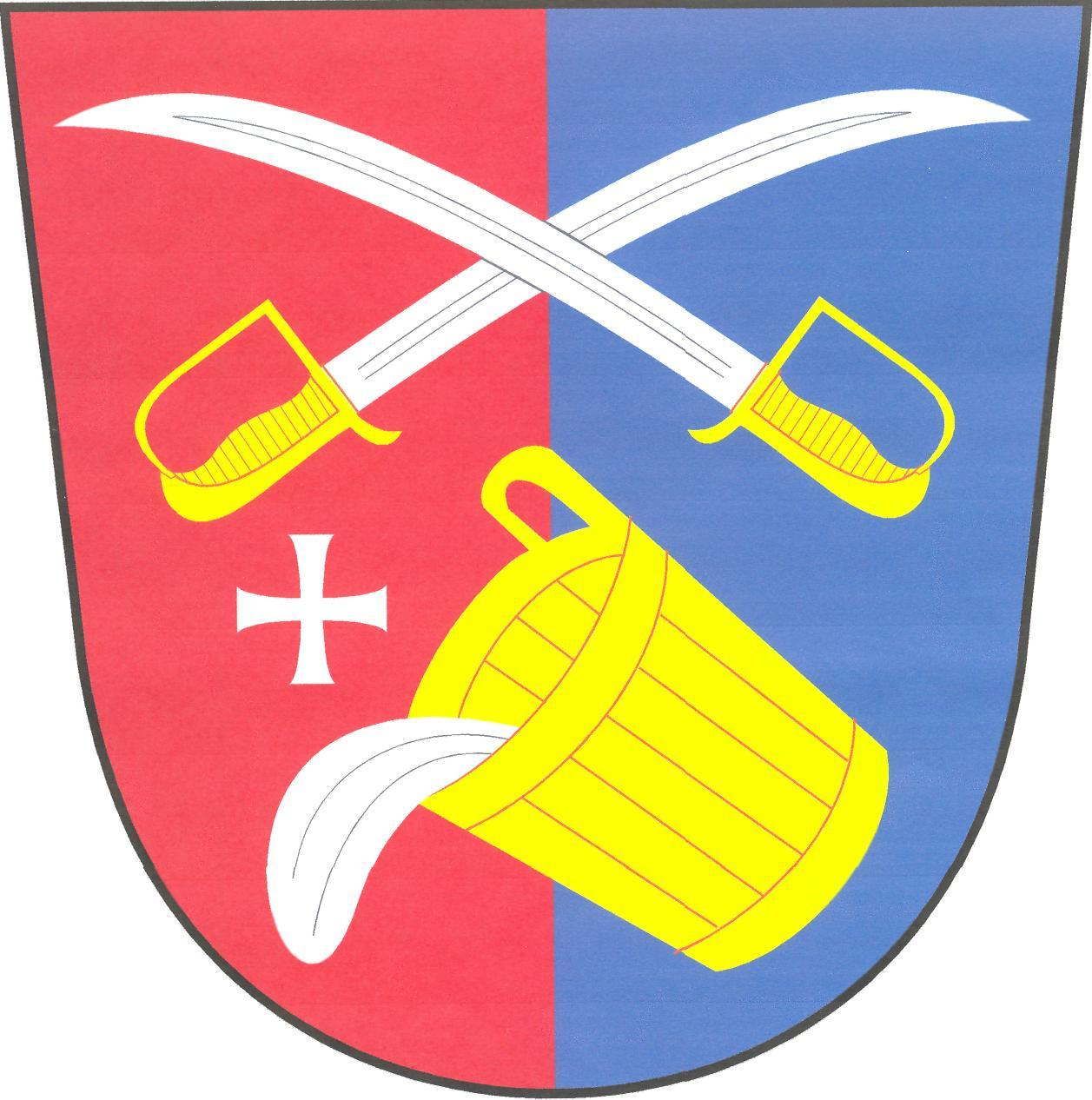
- Flag Coat of arms

- Location in the Czech Republic
- Coordinates: 49°18′3″N 17°37′3″E
- Country: Czech Republic
- Region: Zlín
- District: Kroměříž
- Founded: 1790

Area
  - Total: 0.80 km^{2} (0.31 sq mi)
- Elevation: 262 m (860 ft)

Population (2026-01-01)
  - Total: 280
  - Density: 350/km^{2} (910/sq mi)
- Time zone: UTC+1 (CET)
  - Summer (DST): UTC+2 (CEST)
- Postal code: 769 01
- Website: www.hornilapac.cz

Horní Lapač is a municipality and village in Kroměříž District in the Zlín Region of the Czech Republic. It has about 300 inhabitants.

Horní Lapač lies approximately 17 kilometres (11 mi) east of Kroměříž, 9 km (6 mi) north-west of Zlín, and 247 km (153 mi) east of Prague.

== Demographics ==
Historical population
Year	Pop.	±%
1869	–	—
1880	250	—
1890	292	+16.8%
1900	259	−11.3%
1910	291	+12.4%
1921	278	−4.5%
1930	285	+2.5%
1950	258	−9.5%
1961	287	+11.2%
1970	251	−12.5%
1980	213	−15.1%
1991	218	+2.3%
2001	242	+11.0%
2011	252	+4.1%
2021	254	+0.8%
Source: Censuses
