= Slavkov pod Hostýnem =

- Municipality
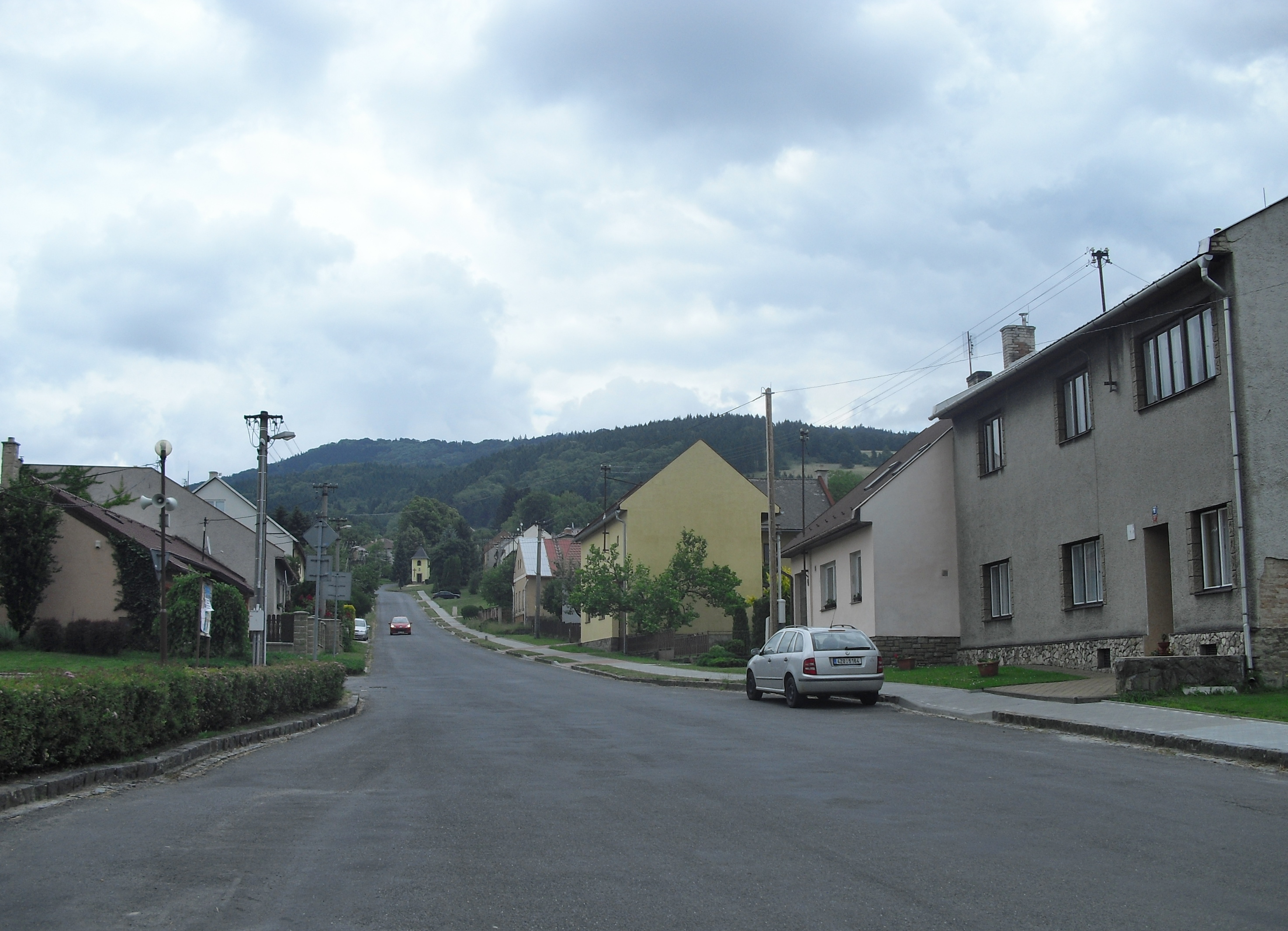
- Main street

- Flag Coat of arms

- Location in the Czech Republic
- Coordinates: 49°22′38″N 17°40′13″E
- Country: Czech Republic
- Region: Zlín
- District: Kroměříž
- First mentioned: 1349

Area
  - Total: 5.20 km^{2} (2.01 sq mi)
- Elevation: 373 m (1,224 ft)

Population (2026-01-01)
  - Total: 656
  - Density: 126/km^{2} (327/sq mi)
- Time zone: UTC+1 (CET)
  - Summer (DST): UTC+2 (CEST)
- Postal code: 768 61
- Website: www.slavkov-ph.cz

Slavkov pod Hostýnem is a municipality and village in Kroměříž District in the Zlín Region of the Czech Republic. It has about 700 inhabitants.

Slavkov pod Hostýnem lies approximately 23 kilometres (14 mi) east of Kroměříž, 16 km (10 mi) north of Zlín, and 248 km (154 mi) east of Prague.

== Demographics ==
Historical population
Year	Pop.	±%
1869	321	—
1880	367	+14.3%
1890	392	+6.8%
1900	446	+13.8%
1910	475	+6.5%
1921	454	−4.4%
1930	518	+14.1%
1950	483	−6.8%
1961	539	+11.6%
1970	565	+4.8%
1980	545	−3.5%
1991	526	−3.5%
2001	550	+4.6%
2011	582	+5.8%
2021	626	+7.6%
Source: Censuses
