= Míškovice =

- Municipality
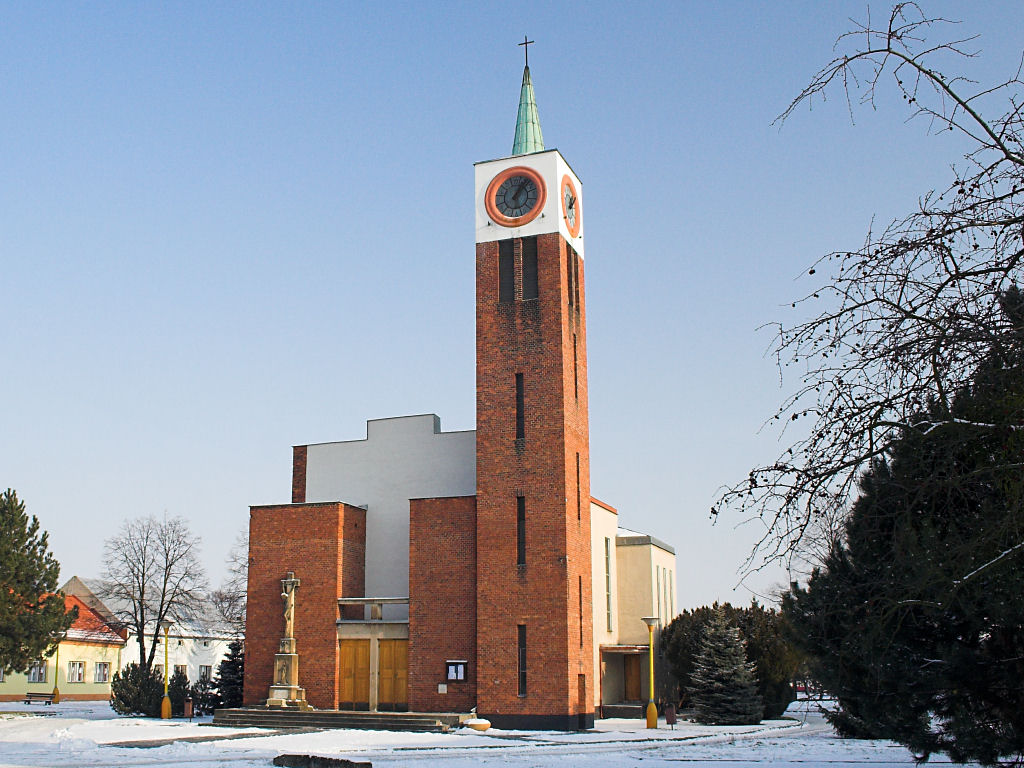
- Church of Saint Anthony of Padua

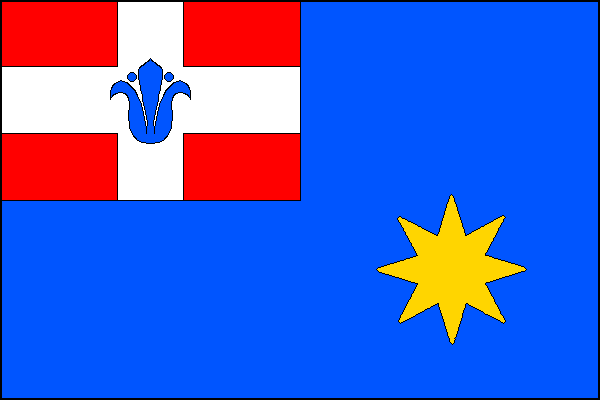
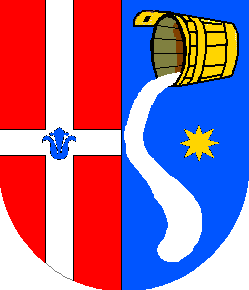
- Flag Coat of arms

- Location in the Czech Republic
- Coordinates: 49°16′36″N 17°32′56″E
- Country: Czech Republic
- Region: Zlín
- District: Kroměříž
- First mentioned: 1397

Area
  - Total: 7.18 km^{2} (2.77 sq mi)
- Elevation: 228 m (748 ft)

Population (2026-01-01)
  - Total: 746
  - Density: 104/km^{2} (269/sq mi)
- Time zone: UTC+1 (CET)
  - Summer (DST): UTC+2 (CEST)
- Postal code: 768 52
- Website: www.obecmiskovice.cz

Míškovice (German: Mischkowitz) is a municipality and village in Kroměříž District in the Zlín Region of the Czech Republic. It has about 700 inhabitants.

== History ==
The first written mention of Míškovice is from 1397.

== Demographics ==
Historical population
Year	Pop.	±%
1869	427	—
1880	469	+9.8%
1890	539	+14.9%
1900	576	+6.9%
1910	577	+0.2%
1921	541	−6.2%
1930	590	+9.1%
1950	547	−7.3%
1961	579	+5.9%
1970	508	−12.3%
1980	479	−5.7%
1991	436	−9.0%
2001	446	+2.3%
2011	533	+19.5%
2021	686	+28.7%
Source: Censuses

== Sights ==
The main landmark of Míškovice is the Church of Saint Anthony of Padua. It was built in 1927 according to the design by František Lydie Gahura.
