= Ludslavice =

- Municipality
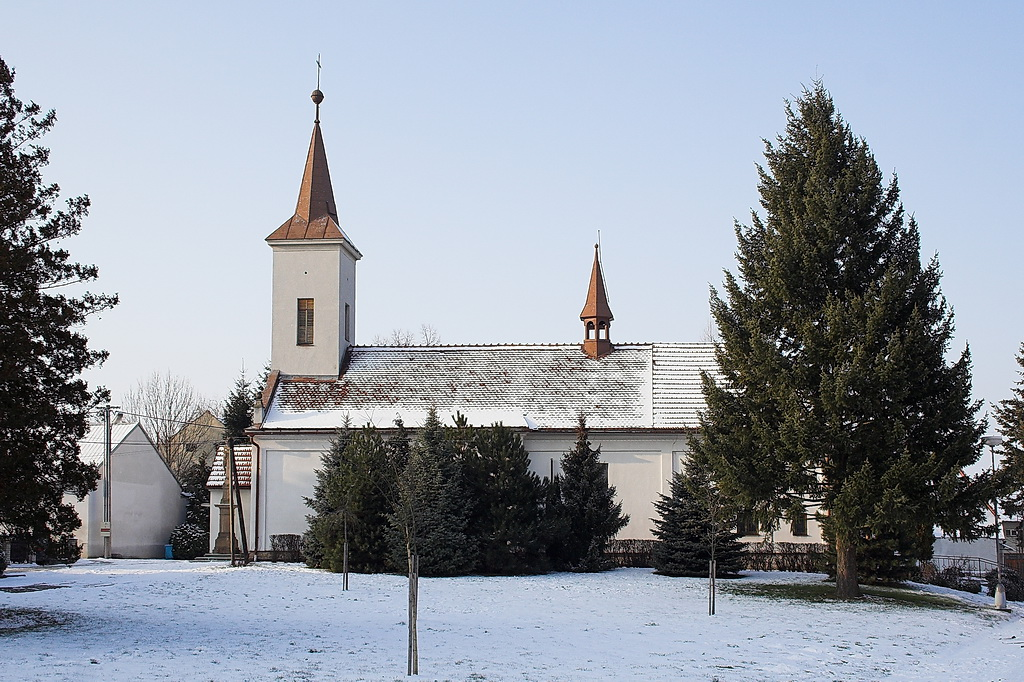
- Church of Saint Wenceslaus

- Flag Coat of arms

- Location in the Czech Republic
- Coordinates: 49°17′58″N 17°32′26″E
- Country: Czech Republic
- Region: Zlín
- District: Kroměříž
- First mentioned: 1275

Area
  - Total: 5.84 km^{2} (2.25 sq mi)
- Elevation: 211 m (692 ft)

Population (2026-01-01)
  - Total: 508
  - Density: 87.0/km^{2} (225/sq mi)
- Time zone: UTC+1 (CET)
  - Summer (DST): UTC+2 (CEST)
- Postal code: 768 52
- Website: www.ludslavice.cz

Ludslavice is a municipality and village in Kroměříž District in the Zlín Region of the Czech Republic. It has about 500 inhabitants.

Ludslavice lies approximately 11 kilometres (7 mi) east of Kroměříž, 12 km (7 mi) north-west of Zlín, and 242 km (150 mi) east of Prague.

== Demographics ==
Historical population
Year	Pop.	±%
1869	432	—
1880	511	+18.3%
1890	520	+1.8%
1900	516	−0.8%
1910	562	+8.9%
1921	587	+4.4%
1930	570	−2.9%
1950	501	−12.1%
1961	512	+2.2%
1970	504	−1.6%
1980	495	−1.8%
1991	502	+1.4%
2001	492	−2.0%
2011	462	−6.1%
2021	479	+3.7%
Source: Censuses
