= Soběsuky =

- Municipality
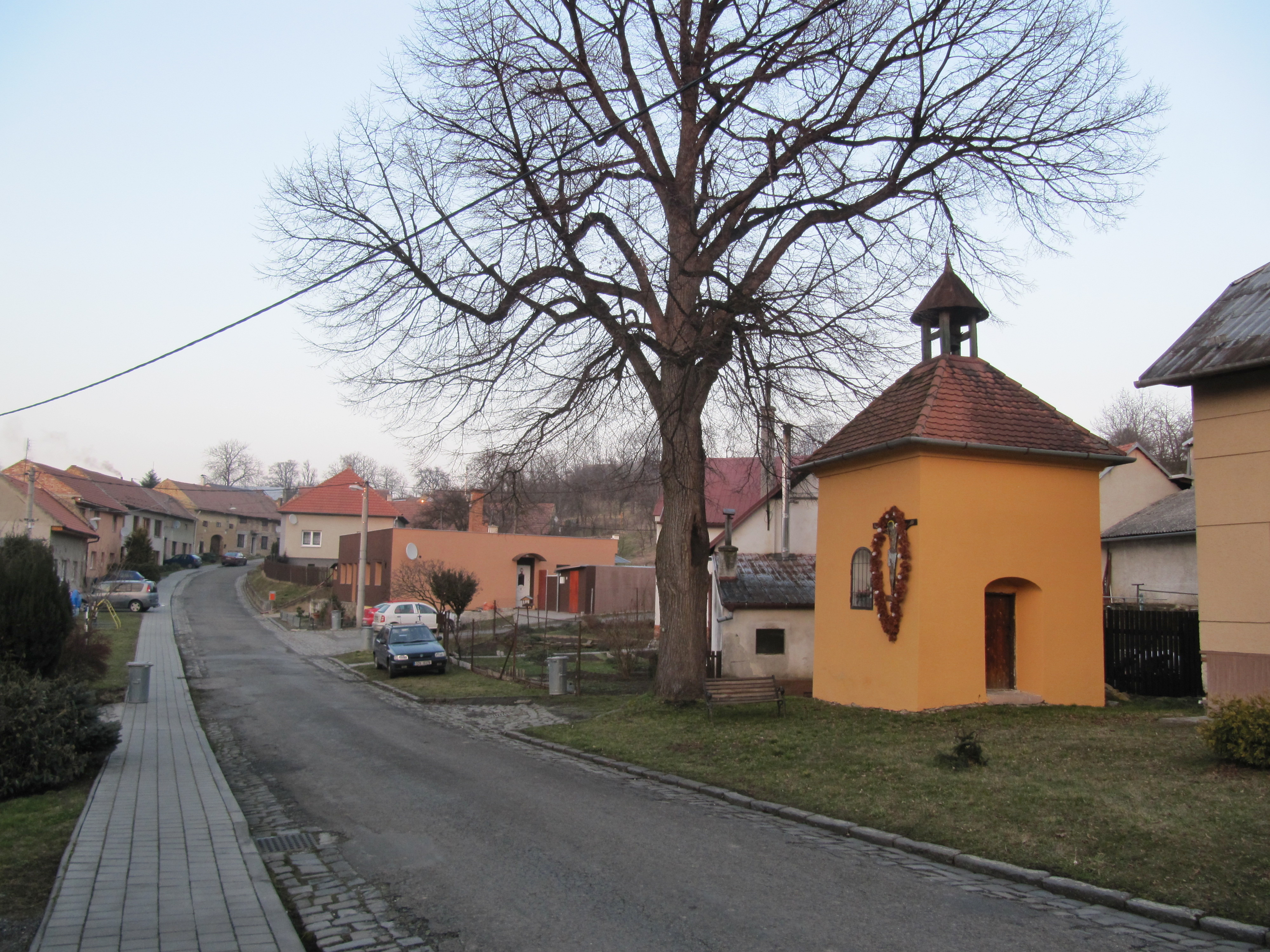
- A street and chapel in Soběsuky

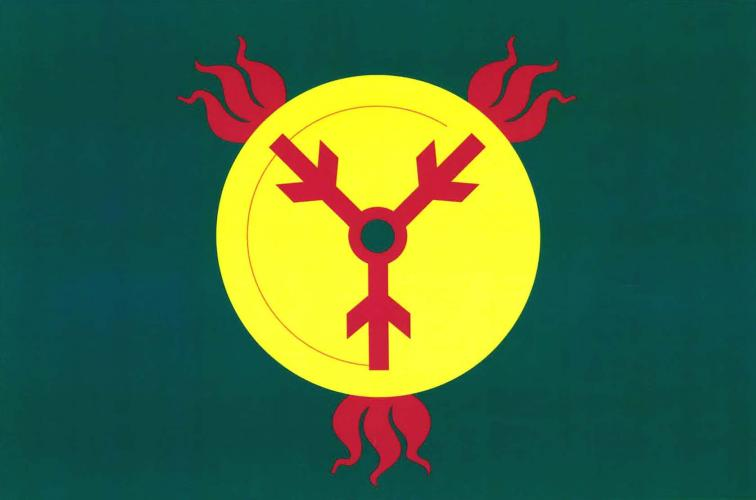
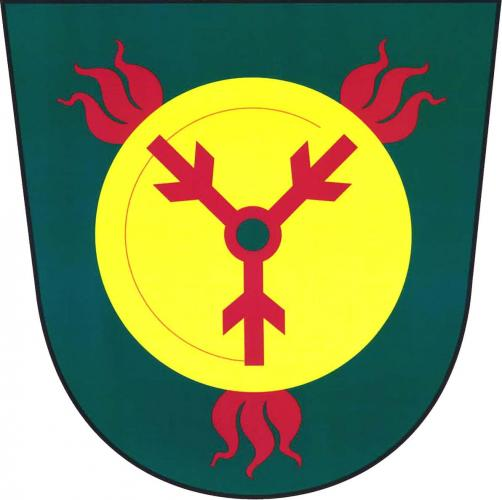
- Flag Coat of arms

- Location in the Czech Republic
- Coordinates: 49°14′0″N 17°21′34″E
- Country: Czech Republic
- Region: Zlín
- District: Kroměříž
- First mentioned: 1287

Area
  - Total: 4.01 km^{2} (1.55 sq mi)
- Elevation: 340 m (1,120 ft)

Population (2026-01-01)
  - Total: 397
  - Density: 99.0/km^{2} (256/sq mi)
- Time zone: UTC+1 (CET)
  - Summer (DST): UTC+2 (CEST)
- Postal code: 768 02
- Website: www.sobesukykm.cz

Soběsuky is a municipality and village in Kroměříž District in the Zlín Region of the Czech Republic. It has about 400 inhabitants.

Soběsuky lies approximately 8 kilometres (5 mi) south of Kroměříž, 23 km (14 mi) west of Zlín, and 232 km (144 mi) south-east of Prague.

== Administrative division ==
Soběsuky consists of three municipal parts (in brackets population according to the 2021 census):

- Soběsuky (134)
- Milovice (146)
- Skržice (74)

== Demographics ==
Historical population
Year	Pop.	±%
1869	563	—
1880	592	+5.2%
1890	603	+1.9%
1900	603	+0.0%
1910	665	+10.3%
1921	664	−0.2%
1930	620	−6.6%
1950	582	−6.1%
1961	583	+0.2%
1970	533	−8.6%
1980	433	−18.8%
1991	332	−23.3%
2001	309	−6.9%
2011	333	+7.8%
2021	354	+6.3%
Source: Censuses
