= Blazice =

- Municipality
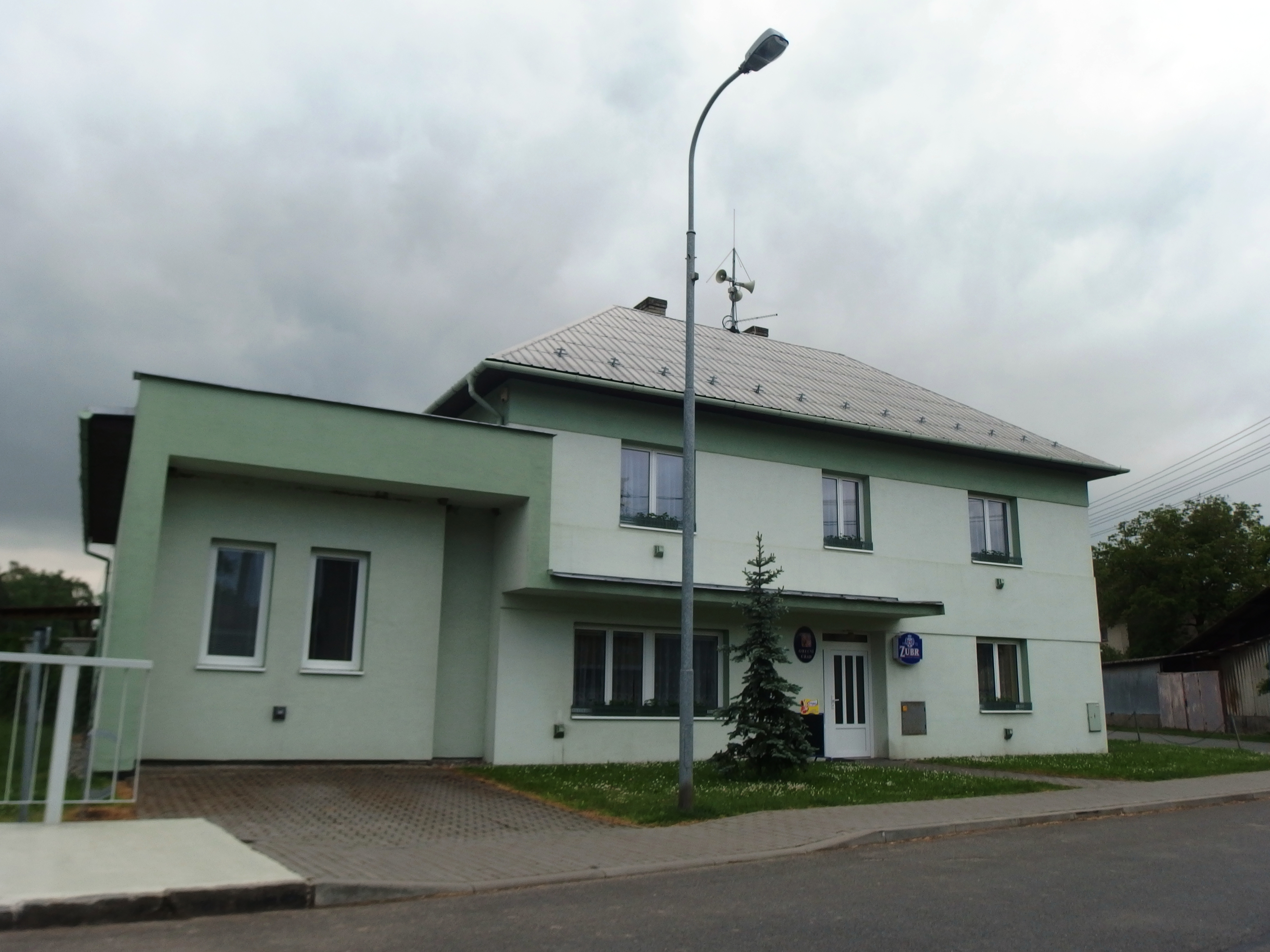
- Municipal office

- Flag Coat of arms

- Location in the Czech Republic
- Coordinates: 49°26′33″N 17°38′43″E
- Country: Czech Republic
- Region: Zlín
- District: Kroměříž
- First mentioned: 1358

Area
  - Total: 3.80 km^{2} (1.47 sq mi)
- Elevation: 257 m (843 ft)

Population (2026-01-01)
  - Total: 218
  - Density: 57.4/km^{2} (149/sq mi)
- Time zone: UTC+1 (CET)
  - Summer (DST): UTC+2 (CEST)
- Postal code: 768 61
- Website: www.blazice.cz

Blazice is a municipality and village in Kroměříž District in the Zlín Region of the Czech Republic. It has about 200 inhabitants.

== History ==
The first written mention of Blazice is from 1358.

== Demographics ==
Historical population
| Year | Pop. | ±% |
|---|---|---|
| 1869 | 248 | — |
| 1880 | 259 | +4.4% |
| 1890 | 293 | +13.1% |
| 1900 | 335 | +14.3% |
| 1910 | 348 | +3.9% |
| 1921 | 315 | −9.5% |
| 1930 | 311 | −1.3% |
| 1950 | 287 | −7.7% |
| 1961 | 330 | +15.0% |
| 1970 | 298 | −9.7% |
| 1980 | 232 | −22.1% |
| 1991 | 225 | −3.0% |
| 2001 | 202 | −10.2% |
| 2011 | 197 | −2.5% |
| 2021 | 197 | +0.0% |
Source: Censuses
