= Zahnašovice =

- Municipality
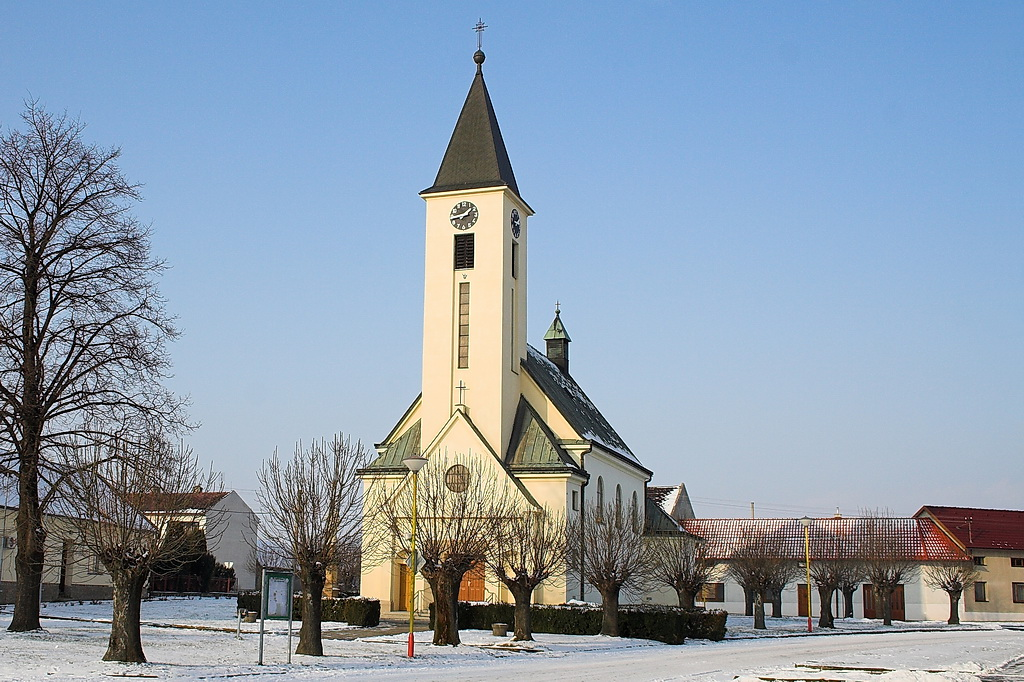
- Church of the Visitation of the Virgin Mary

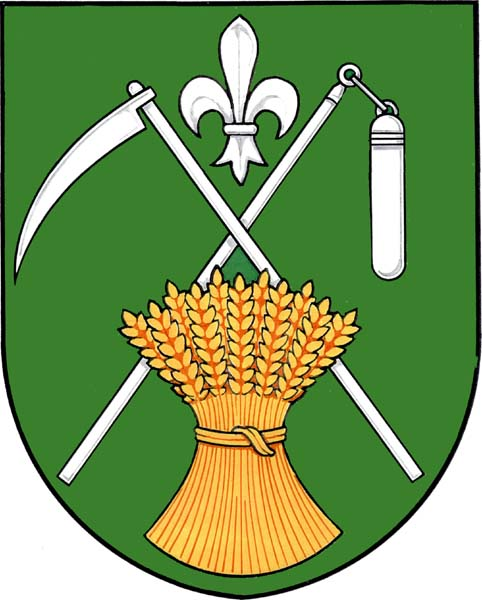
- Flag Coat of arms

- Location in the Czech Republic
- Coordinates: 49°18′16″N 17°33′36″E
- Country: Czech Republic
- Region: Zlín
- District: Kroměříž
- First mentioned: 1141

Area
  - Total: 5.68 km^{2} (2.19 sq mi)
- Elevation: 217 m (712 ft)

Population (2026-01-01)
  - Total: 305
  - Density: 53.7/km^{2} (139/sq mi)
- Time zone: UTC+1 (CET)
  - Summer (DST): UTC+2 (CEST)
- Postal code: 769 01
- Website: www.zahnasovice.cz

Zahnašovice is a municipality and village in Kroměříž District in the Zlín Region of the Czech Republic. It has about 300 inhabitants.

Zahnašovice lies approximately 13 kilometres (8 mi) east of Kroměříž, 12 km (7 mi) north-west of Zlín, and 243 km (151 mi) east of Prague.

== Demographics ==
Historical population
Year	Pop.	±%
1869	390	—
1880	455	+16.7%
1890	465	+2.2%
1900	500	+7.5%
1910	465	−7.0%
1921	486	+4.5%
1930	488	+0.4%
1950	434	−11.1%
1961	428	−1.4%
1970	418	−2.3%
1980	416	−0.5%
1991	353	−15.1%
2001	335	−5.1%
2011	326	−2.7%
2021	304	−6.7%
Source: Censuses
