= Šelešovice =

- Municipality
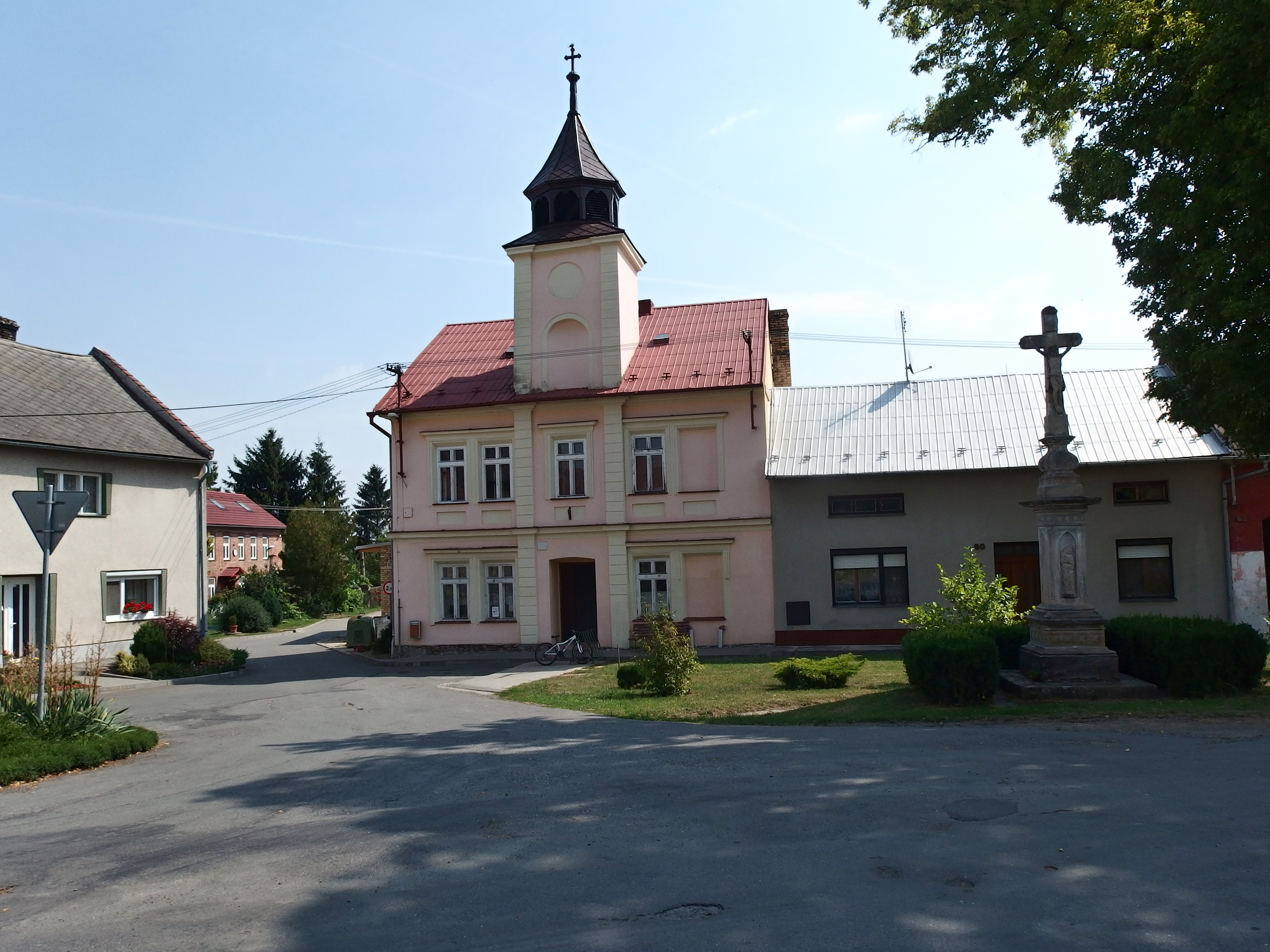
- Former municipal office

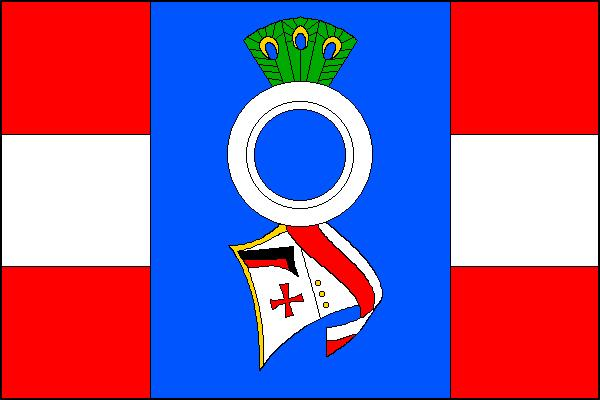
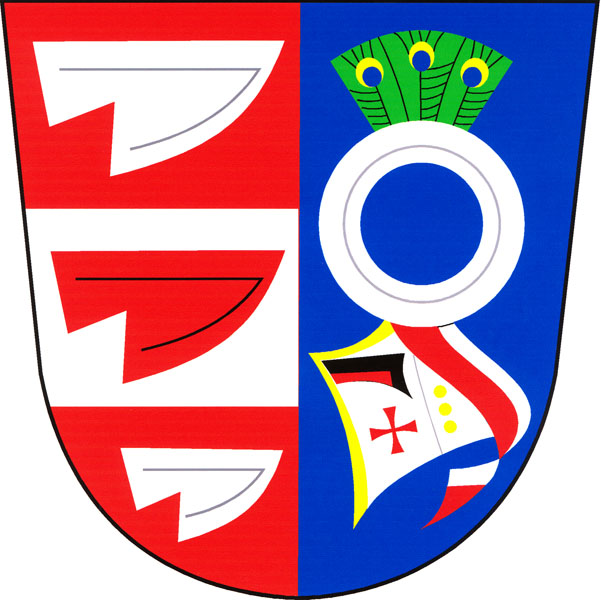
- Flag Coat of arms

- Location in the Czech Republic
- Coordinates: 49°15′17″N 17°21′36″E
- Country: Czech Republic
- Region: Zlín
- District: Kroměříž
- First mentioned: 1290

Area
  - Total: 4.62 km^{2} (1.78 sq mi)
- Elevation: 209 m (686 ft)

Population (2026-01-01)
  - Total: 342
  - Density: 74.0/km^{2} (192/sq mi)
- Time zone: UTC+1 (CET)
  - Summer (DST): UTC+2 (CEST)
- Postal code: 767 01
- Website: www.selesovice.cz

Šelešovice is a municipality and village in Kroměříž District in the Zlín Region of the Czech Republic. It has about 300 inhabitants.

Šelešovice lies approximately 7 kilometres (4 mi) south-west of Kroměříž, 23 km (14 mi) west of Zlín, and 231 km (144 mi) south-east of Prague.

== Demographics ==
Historical population
Year	Pop.	±%
1869	350	—
1880	383	+9.4%
1890	384	+0.3%
1900	441	+14.8%
1910	431	−2.3%
1921	473	+9.7%
1930	526	+11.2%
1950	464	−11.8%
1961	419	−9.7%
1970	359	−14.3%
1980	344	−4.2%
1991	331	−3.8%
2001	318	−3.9%
2011	312	−1.9%
2021	352	+12.8%
Source: Censuses
