= Záříčí =

- Municipality
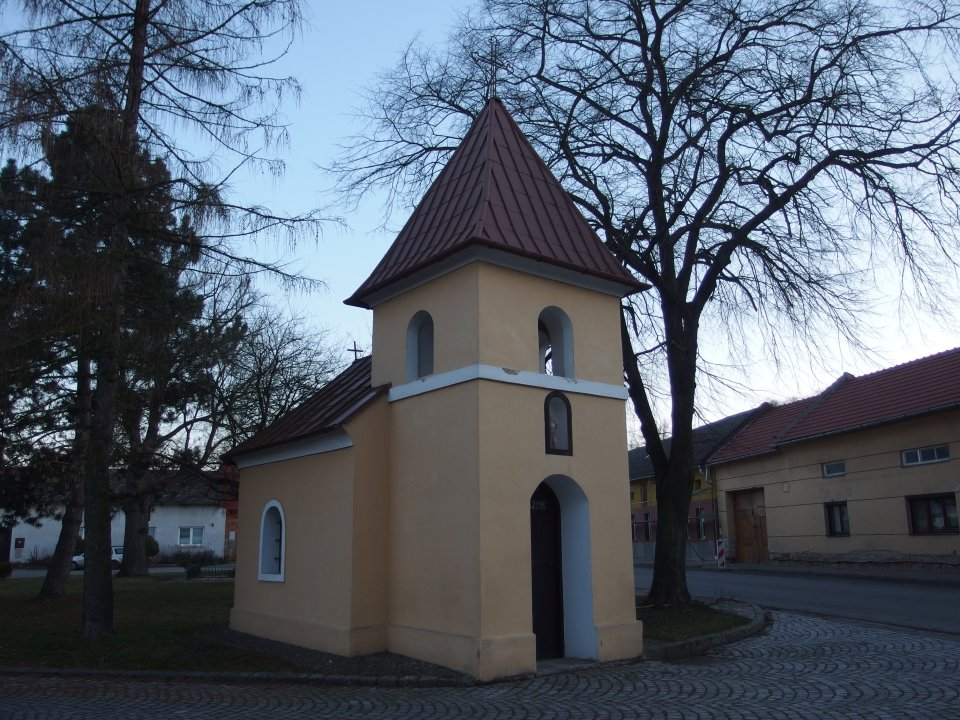
- Chapel of Saint Florian

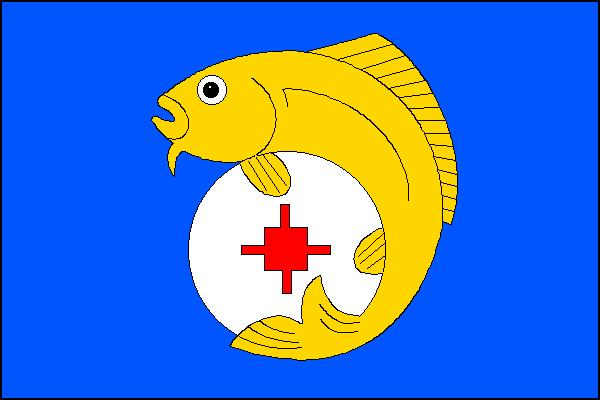
- Flag Coat of arms

- Location in the Czech Republic
- Coordinates: 49°22′57″N 17°21′10″E
- Country: Czech Republic
- Region: Zlín
- District: Kroměříž
- First mentioned: 1261

Area
  - Total: 8.06 km^{2} (3.11 sq mi)
- Elevation: 196 m (643 ft)

Population (2026-01-01)
  - Total: 749
  - Density: 92.9/km^{2} (241/sq mi)
- Time zone: UTC+1 (CET)
  - Summer (DST): UTC+2 (CEST)
- Postal code: 768 11
- Website: www.zarici.cz

Záříčí is a municipality and village in Kroměříž District in the Zlín Region of the Czech Republic. It has about 700 inhabitants.

Záříčí lies approximately 10 kilometres (6 mi) north of Kroměříž, 29 km (18 mi) north-west of Zlín, and 225 km (140 mi) east of Prague.

== Demographics ==
Historical population
Year	Pop.	±%
1869	539	—
1880	718	+33.2%
1890	792	+10.3%
1900	761	−3.9%
1910	801	+5.3%
1921	861	+7.5%
1930	883	+2.6%
1950	812	−8.0%
1961	886	+9.1%
1970	863	−2.6%
1980	781	−9.5%
1991	660	−15.5%
2001	742	+12.4%
2011	746	+0.5%
2021	684	−8.3%
Source: Censuses
