= Mrlínek =

- Municipality
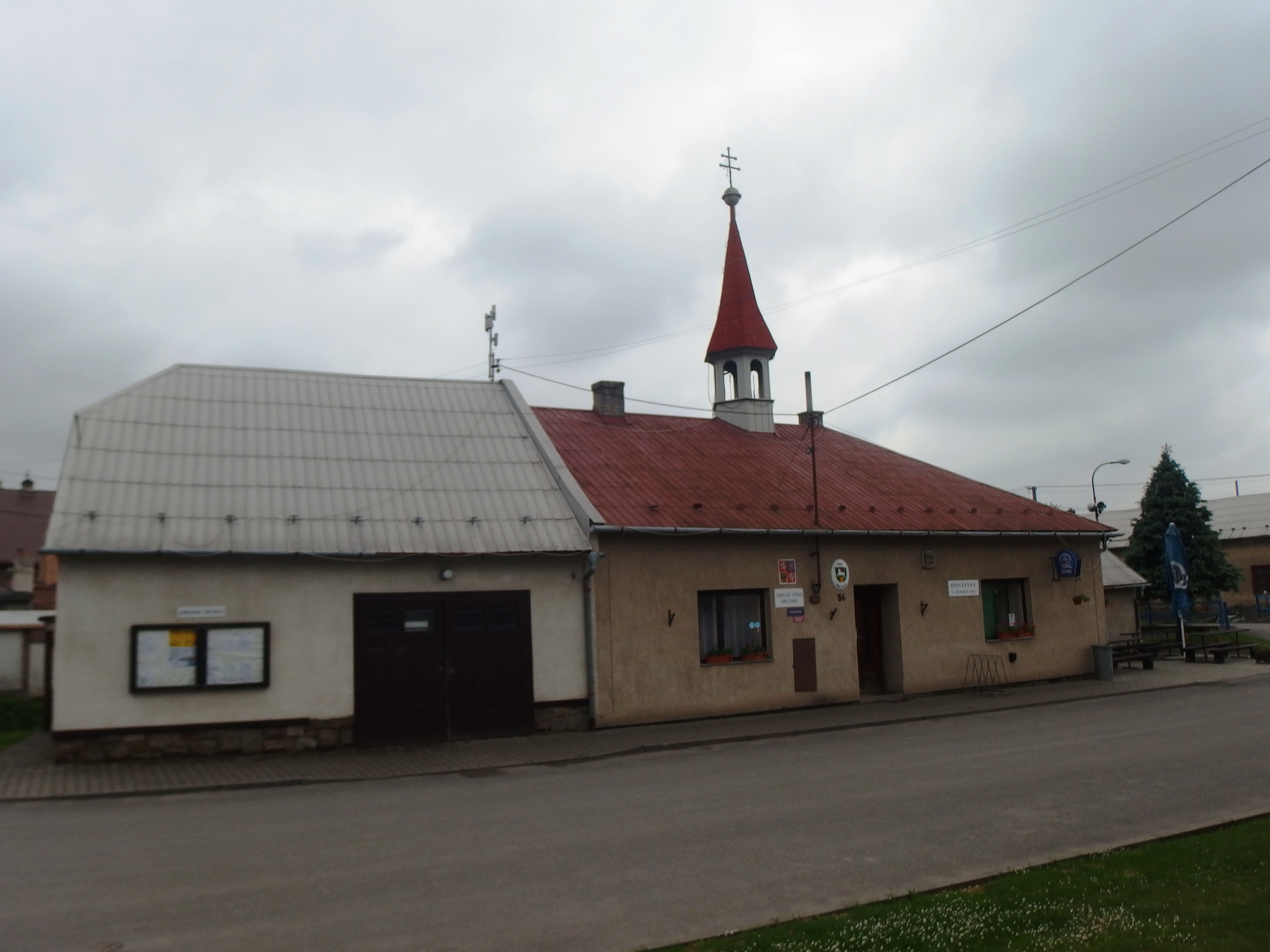
- Municipal office

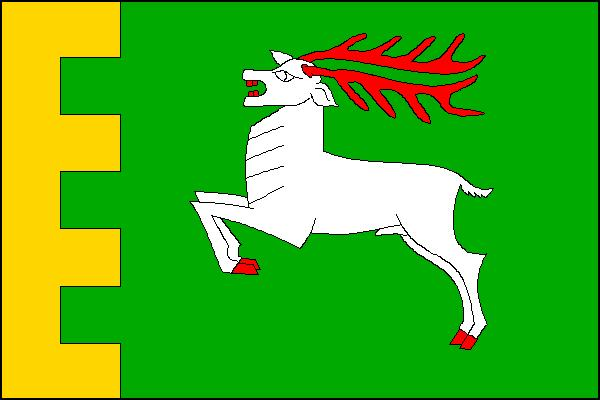
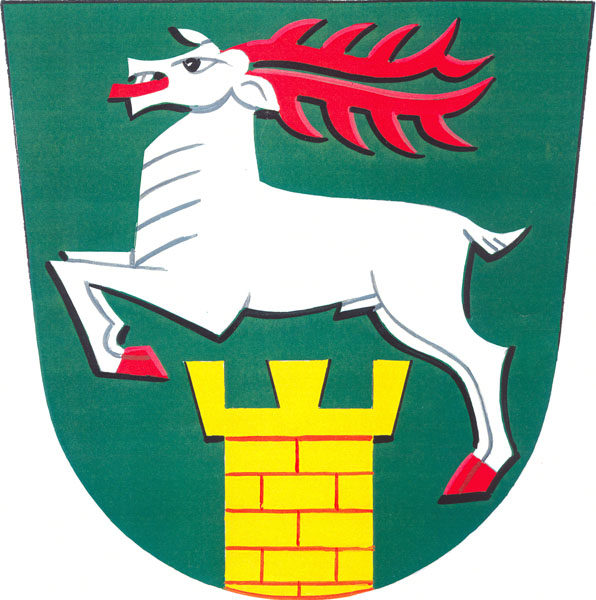
- Flag Coat of arms

- Location in the Czech Republic
- Coordinates: 49°25′42″N 17°40′42″E
- Country: Czech Republic
- Region: Zlín
- District: Kroměříž
- First mentioned: 1348

Area
  - Total: 3.93 km^{2} (1.52 sq mi)
- Elevation: 288 m (945 ft)

Population (2026-01-01)
  - Total: 272
  - Density: 69.2/km^{2} (179/sq mi)
- Time zone: UTC+1 (CET)
  - Summer (DST): UTC+2 (CEST)
- Postal code: 768 61
- Website: www.mrlinek.cz

Mrlínek is a municipality and village in Kroměříž District in the Zlín Region of the Czech Republic. It has about 300 inhabitants.

Mrlínek lies approximately 26 kilometres (16 mi) north-east of Kroměříž, 22 km (14 mi) north of Zlín, and 246 km (153 mi) east of Prague.

== Demographics ==
Historical population
Year	Pop.	±%
1869	284	—
1880	269	−5.3%
1890	314	+16.7%
1900	301	−4.1%
1910	331	+10.0%
1921	322	−2.7%
1930	369	+14.6%
1950	304	−17.6%
1961	334	+9.9%
1970	289	−13.5%
1980	263	−9.0%
1991	262	−0.4%
2001	276	+5.3%
2011	281	+1.8%
2021	268	−4.6%
Source: Censuses
