= Honětice =

- Municipality
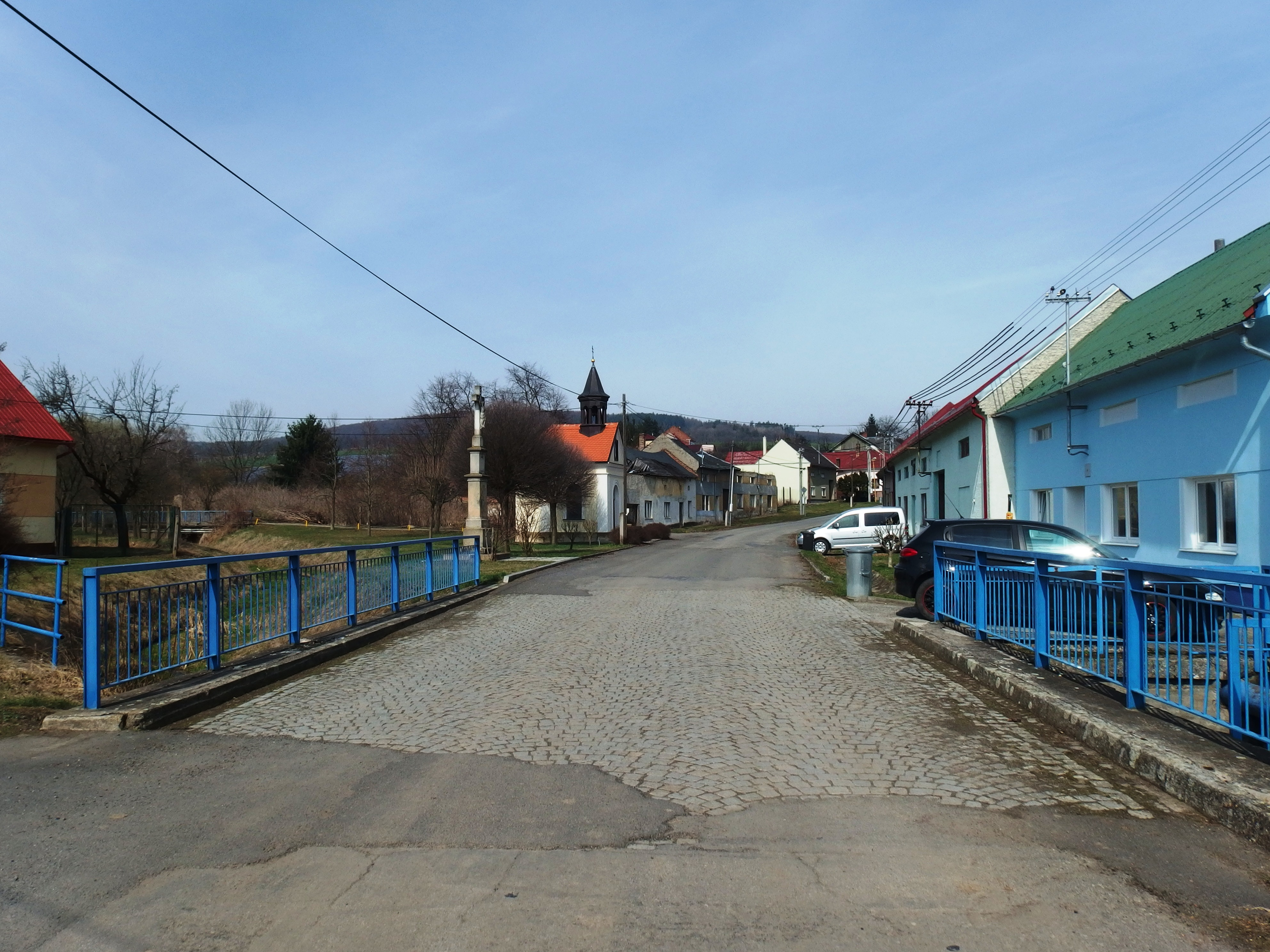
- Centre of Honětice

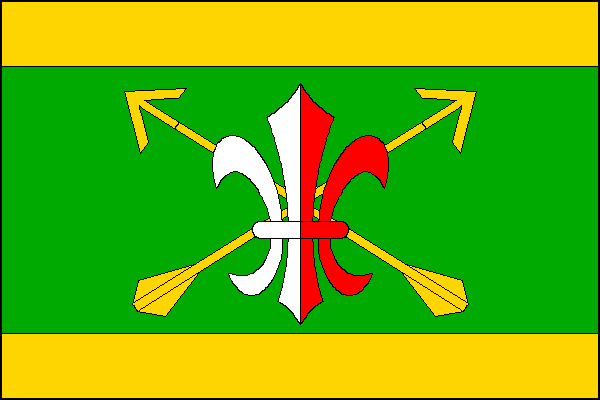
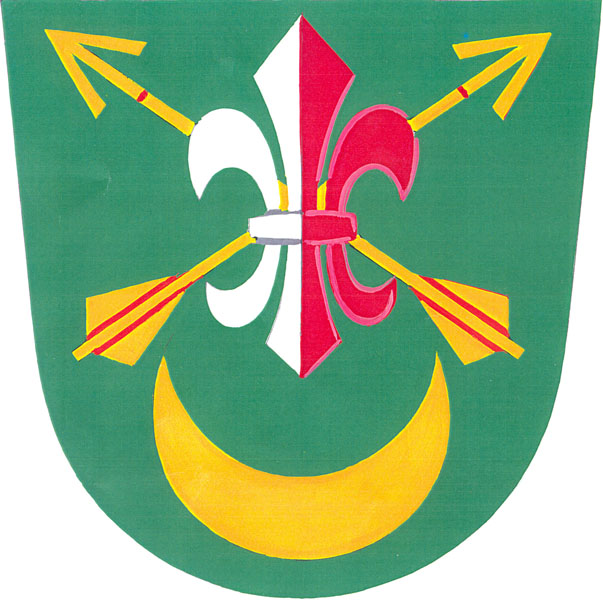
- Flag Coat of arms

- Location in the Czech Republic
- Coordinates: 49°12′13″N 17°15′11″E
- Country: Czech Republic
- Region: Zlín
- District: Kroměříž
- First mentioned: 1353

Area
  - Total: 3.69 km^{2} (1.42 sq mi)
- Elevation: 265 m (869 ft)

Population (2026-01-01)
  - Total: 82
  - Density: 22/km^{2} (58/sq mi)
- Time zone: UTC+1 (CET)
  - Summer (DST): UTC+2 (CEST)
- Postal code: 768 13
- Website: www.obec-honetice.cz

Honětice is a municipality and village in Kroměříž District in the Zlín Region of the Czech Republic. It has about 80 inhabitants.

Honětice lies approximately 15 kilometres (9 mi) south-west of Kroměříž, 31 km (19 mi) west of Zlín, and 227 km (141 mi) south-east of Prague.

== Demographics ==
Historical population
Year	Pop.	±%
1869	344	—
1880	380	+10.5%
1890	363	−4.5%
1900	392	+8.0%
1910	379	−3.3%
1921	384	+1.3%
1930	357	−7.0%
1950	266	−25.5%
1961	232	−12.8%
1970	202	−12.9%
1980	130	−35.6%
1991	85	−34.6%
2001	68	−20.0%
2011	71	+4.4%
2021	75	+5.6%
Source: Censuses
