= Kyselovice =

- Municipality
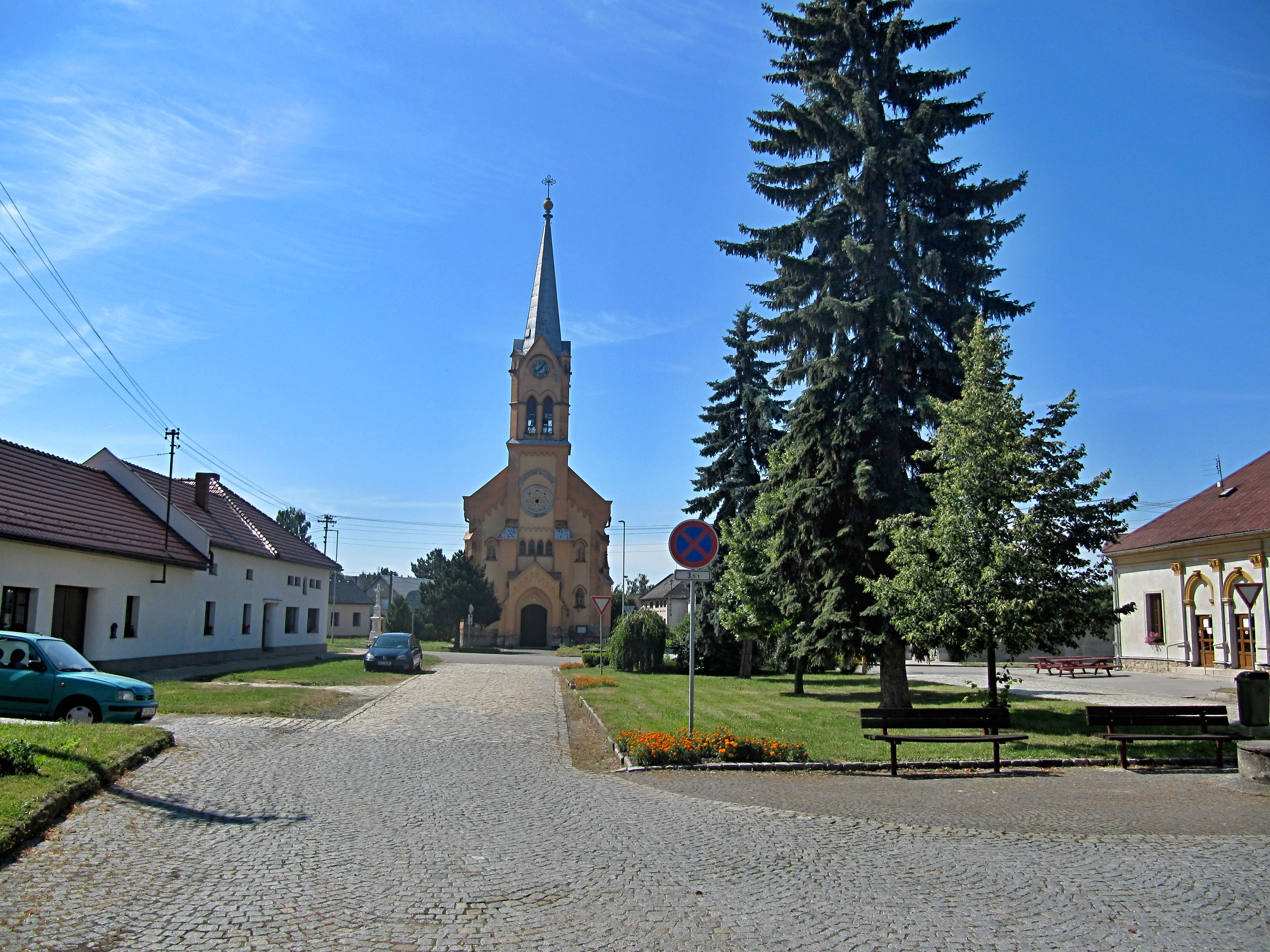
- Centre of Kyselovice

- Flag Coat of arms

- Location in the Czech Republic
- Coordinates: 49°22′38″N 17°24′7″E
- Country: Czech Republic
- Region: Zlín
- District: Kroměříž
- First mentioned: 1078

Area
  - Total: 6.76 km^{2} (2.61 sq mi)
- Elevation: 197 m (646 ft)

Population (2026-01-01)
  - Total: 500
  - Density: 74/km^{2} (190/sq mi)
- Time zone: UTC+1 (CET)
  - Summer (DST): UTC+2 (CEST)
- Postal code: 768 11
- Website: www.obec-kyselovice.cz

Kyselovice is a municipality and village in Kroměříž District in the Zlín Region of the Czech Republic. It has about 500 inhabitants.

Kyselovice lies approximately 9 kilometres (6 mi) north of Kroměříž, 25 km (16 mi) north-west of Zlín, and 229 km (142 mi) east of Prague.

== Demographics ==
Historical population
Year	Pop.	±%
1869	665	—
1880	706	+6.2%
1890	841	+19.1%
1900	903	+7.4%
1910	862	−4.5%
1921	833	−3.4%
1930	799	−4.1%
1950	705	−11.8%
1961	739	+4.8%
1970	679	−8.1%
1980	607	−10.6%
1991	540	−11.0%
2001	488	−9.6%
2011	477	−2.3%
2021	469	−1.7%
Source: Censuses
