= Nová Dědina =

- Municipality
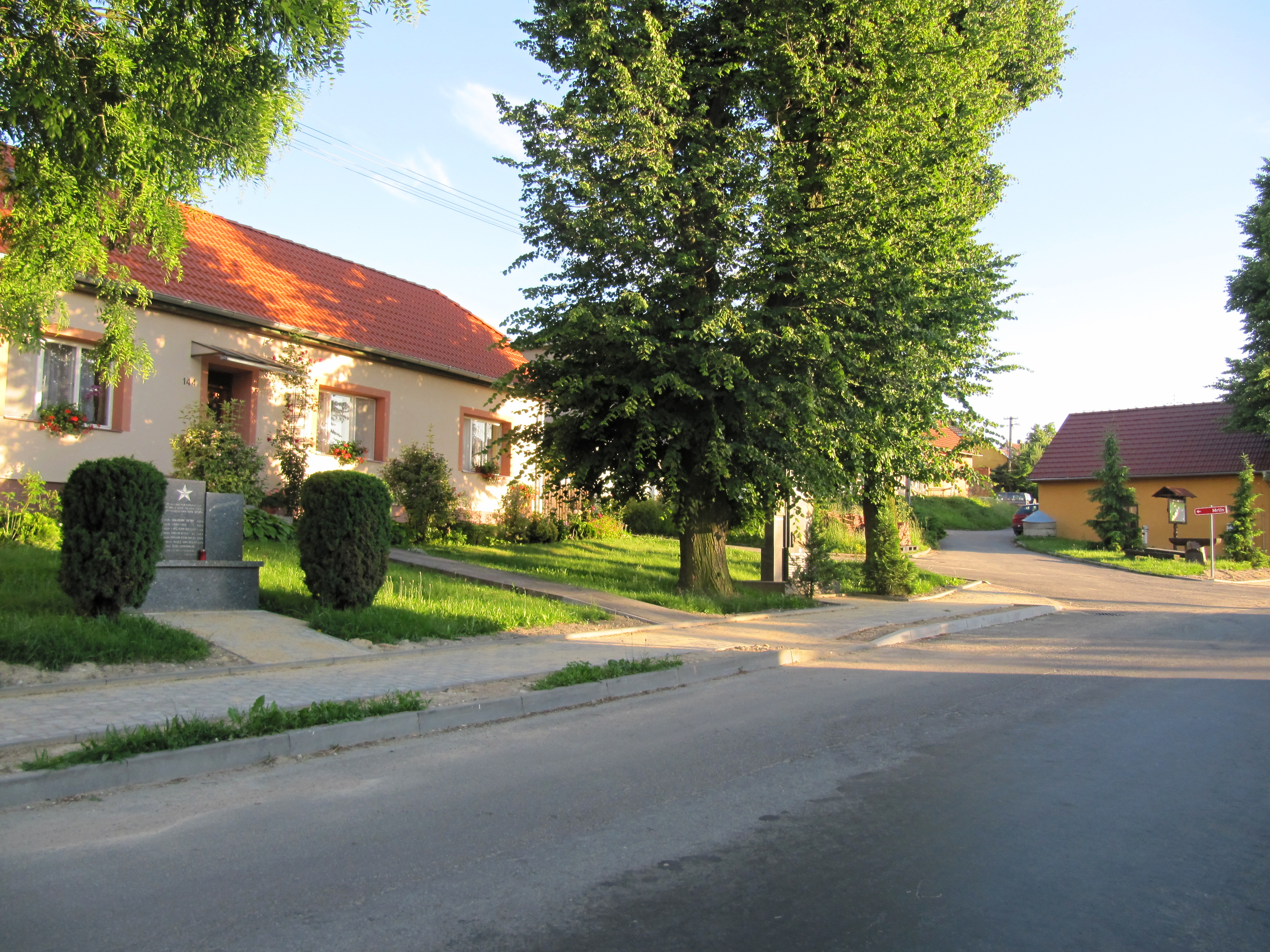
- Centre of Nová Dědina

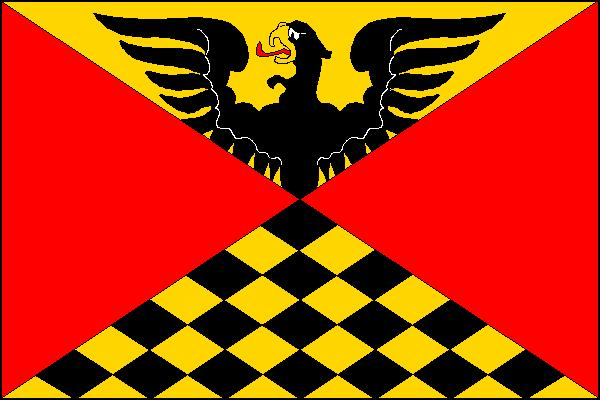
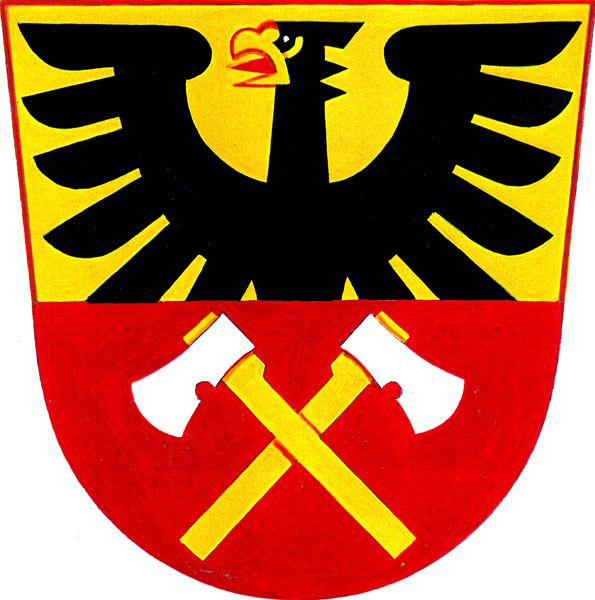
- Flag Coat of arms

- Location in the Czech Republic
- Coordinates: 49°12′36″N 17°27′13″E
- Country: Czech Republic
- Region: Zlín
- District: Kroměříž
- Founded: 1656

Area
  - Total: 7.56 km^{2} (2.92 sq mi)
- Elevation: 338 m (1,109 ft)

Population (2026-01-01)
  - Total: 437
  - Density: 57.8/km^{2} (150/sq mi)
- Time zone: UTC+1 (CET)
  - Summer (DST): UTC+2 (CEST)
- Postal code: 768 21
- Website: www.novadedina.cz

Nová Dědina is a municipality and village in Kroměříž District in the Zlín Region of the Czech Republic. It has about 400 inhabitants.

Nová Dědina lies approximately 11 kilometres (7 mi) south-east of Kroměříž, 16 km (10 mi) west of Zlín, and 240 km (150 mi) south-east of Prague.

== Demographics ==
Historical population
Year	Pop.	±%
1869	585	—
1880	728	+24.4%
1890	700	−3.8%
1900	665	−5.0%
1910	655	−1.5%
1921	631	−3.7%
1930	562	−10.9%
1950	532	−5.3%
1961	572	+7.5%
1970	516	−9.8%
1980	463	−10.3%
1991	432	−6.7%
2001	420	−2.8%
2011	409	−2.6%
2021	420	+2.7%
Source: Censuses
