= Prasklice =

- Municipality
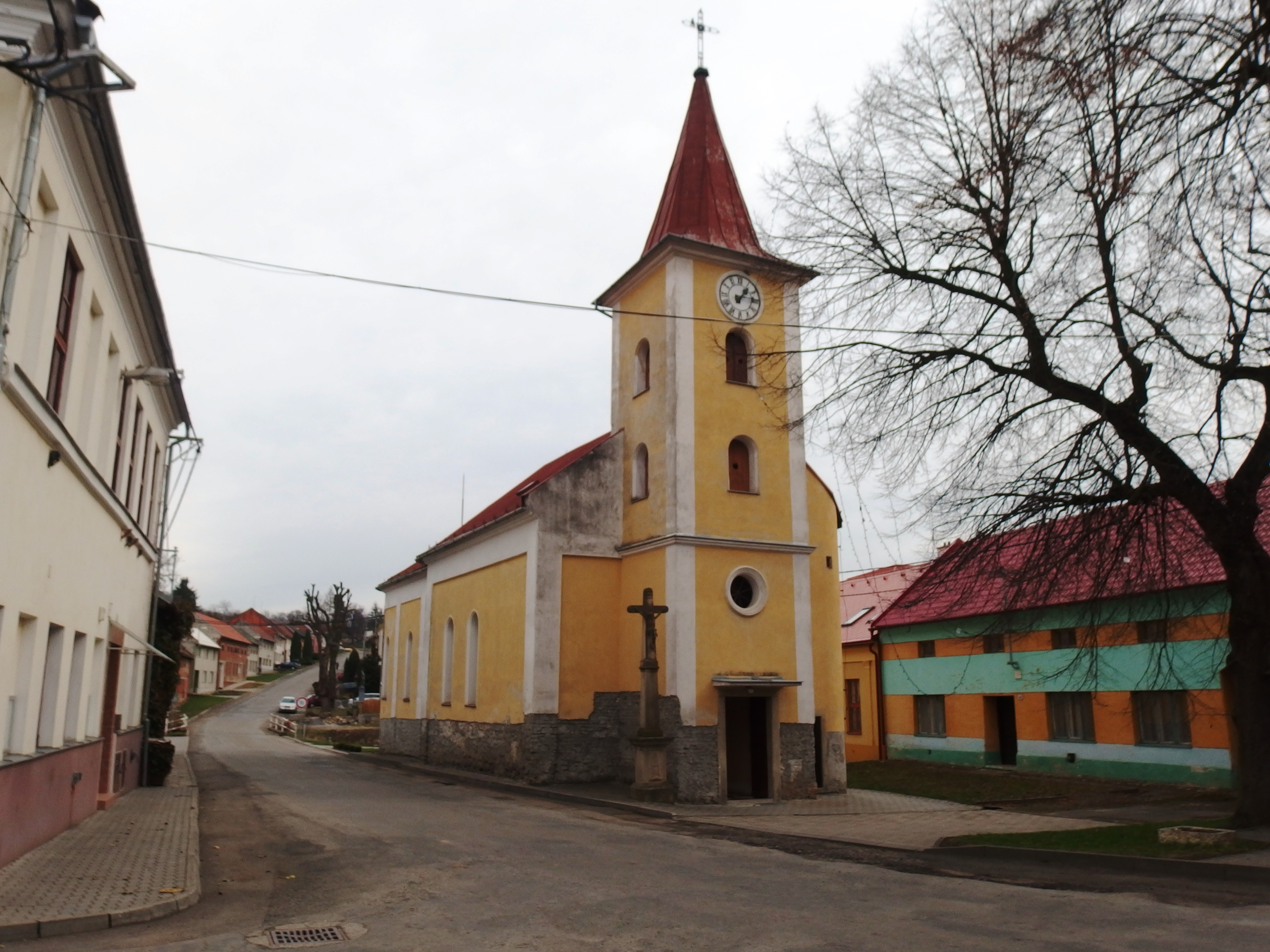
- Church of Saint Anne

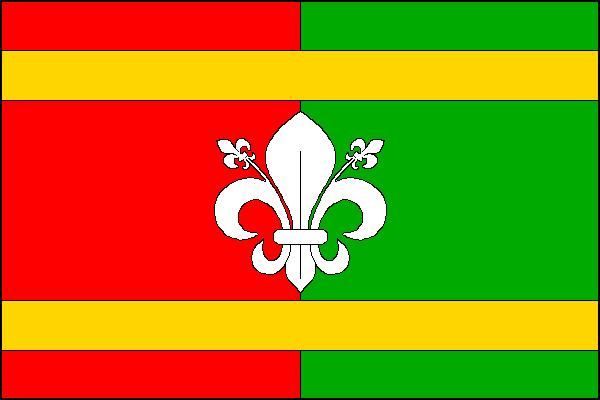
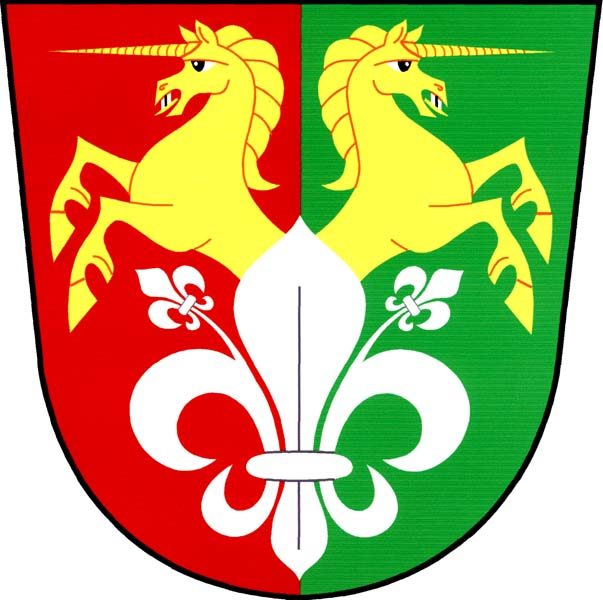
- Flag Coat of arms

- Location in the Czech Republic
- Coordinates: 49°16′7″N 17°11′12″E
- Country: Czech Republic
- Region: Zlín
- District: Kroměříž
- First mentioned: 1355

Area
  - Total: 3.95 km^{2} (1.53 sq mi)
- Elevation: 255 m (837 ft)

Population (2026-01-01)
  - Total: 246
  - Density: 62.3/km^{2} (161/sq mi)
- Time zone: UTC+1 (CET)
  - Summer (DST): UTC+2 (CEST)
- Postal code: 768 33
- Website: www.obecprasklice.cz

Prasklice is a municipality and village in Kroměříž District in the Zlín Region of the Czech Republic. It has about 200 inhabitants.

Prasklice lies approximately 16 kilometres (10 mi) west of Kroměříž, 36 km (22 mi) west of Zlín, and 219 km (136 mi) south-east of Prague.

== Demographics ==
Historical population
Year	Pop.	±%
1869	460	—
1880	473	+2.8%
1890	517	+9.3%
1900	518	+0.2%
1910	527	+1.7%
1921	521	−1.1%
1930	581	+11.5%
1950	419	−27.9%
1961	402	−4.1%
1970	386	−4.0%
1980	333	−13.7%
1991	261	−21.6%
2001	244	−6.5%
2011	246	+0.8%
2021	259	+5.3%
Source: Censuses
