= Vrbka =

- Municipality
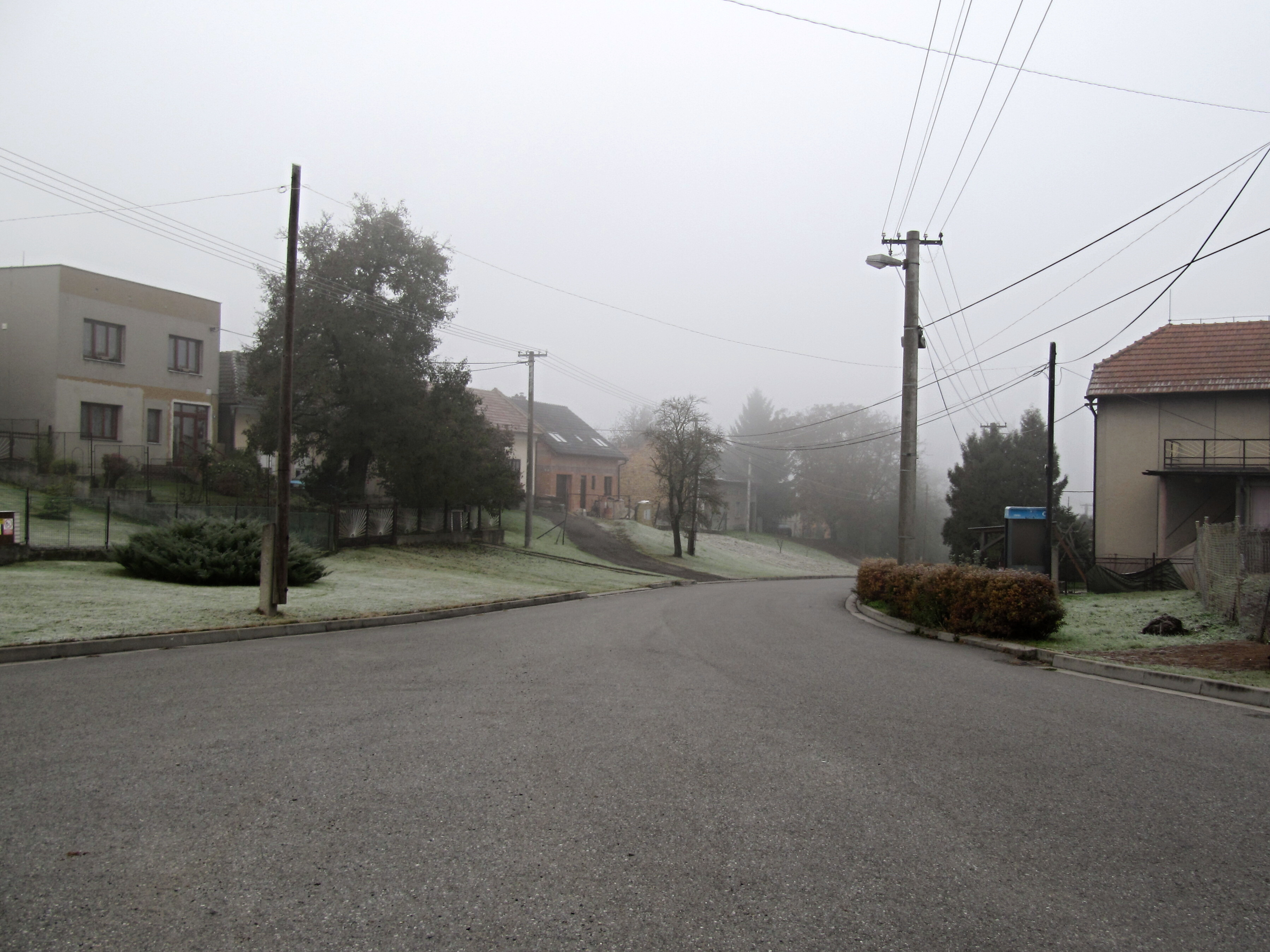
- Centre of Vrbka

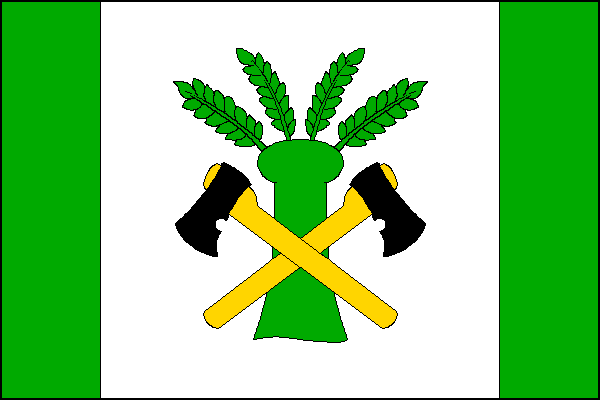
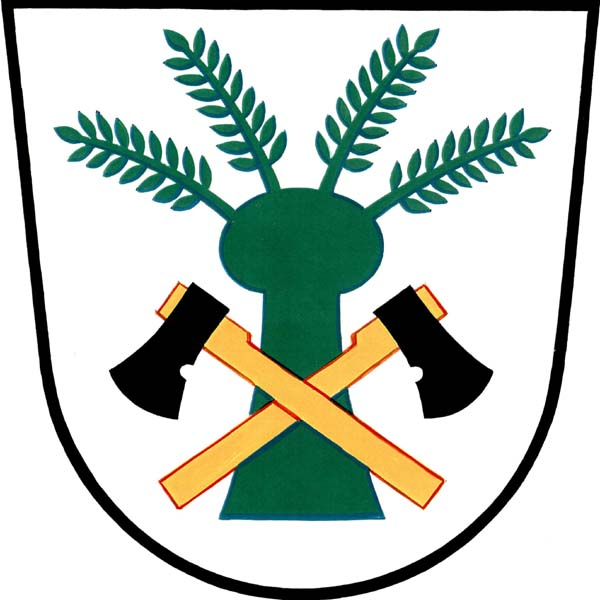
- Flag Coat of arms

- Location in the Czech Republic
- Coordinates: 49°13′42″N 17°24′47″E
- Country: Czech Republic
- Region: Zlín
- District: Kroměříž
- First mentioned: 1464

Area
  - Total: 5.31 km^{2} (2.05 sq mi)
- Elevation: 294 m (965 ft)

Population (2026-01-01)
  - Total: 194
  - Density: 36.5/km^{2} (94.6/sq mi)
- Time zone: UTC+1 (CET)
  - Summer (DST): UTC+2 (CEST)
- Postal code: 768 21
- Website: www.obec-vrbka.cz

Vrbka is a municipality and village in Kroměříž District in the Zlín Region of the Czech Republic. It has about 200 inhabitants.

Vrbka lies approximately 10 kilometres (6 mi) south of Kroměříž, 19 km (12 mi) west of Zlín, and 237 km (147 mi) south-east of Prague.

== Demographics ==
Historical population
Year	Pop.	±%
1869	334	—
1880	353	+5.7%
1890	302	−14.4%
1900	306	+1.3%
1910	314	+2.6%
1921	307	−2.2%
1930	332	+8.1%
1950	243	−26.8%
1961	276	+13.6%
1970	283	+2.5%
1980	255	−9.9%
1991	203	−20.4%
2001	206	+1.5%
2011	208	+1.0%
2021	190	−8.7%
Source: Censuses
