= Roštění =

- Municipality
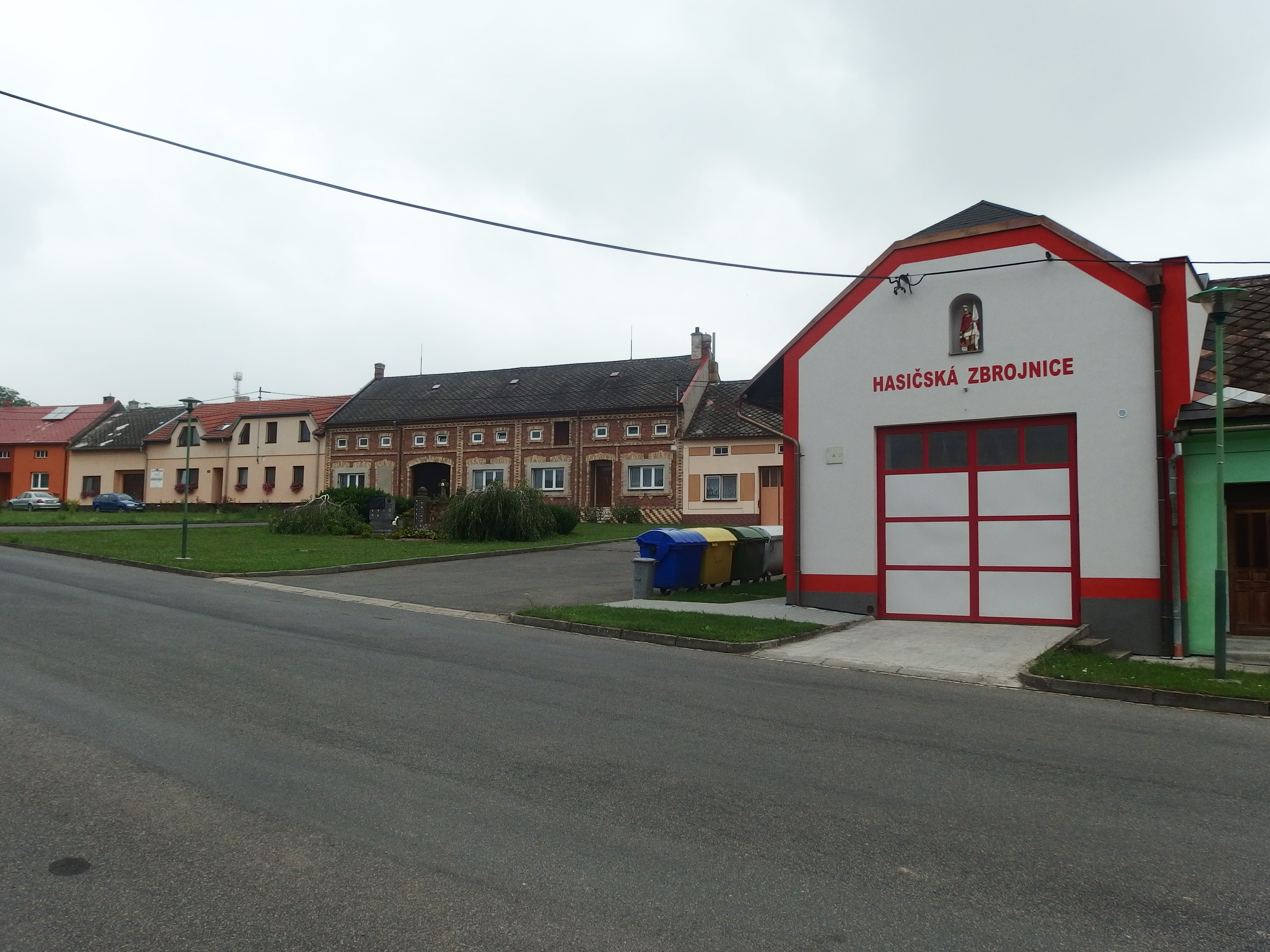
- Centre of Roštění

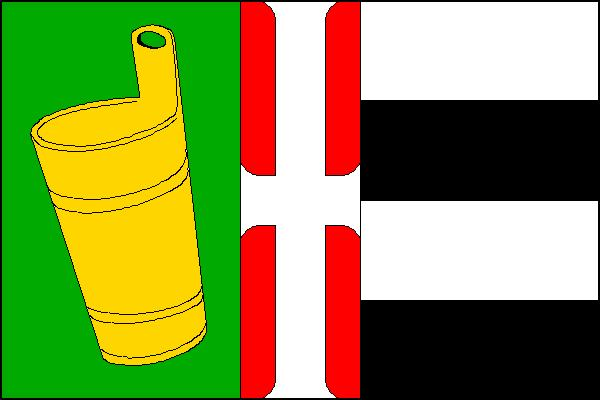
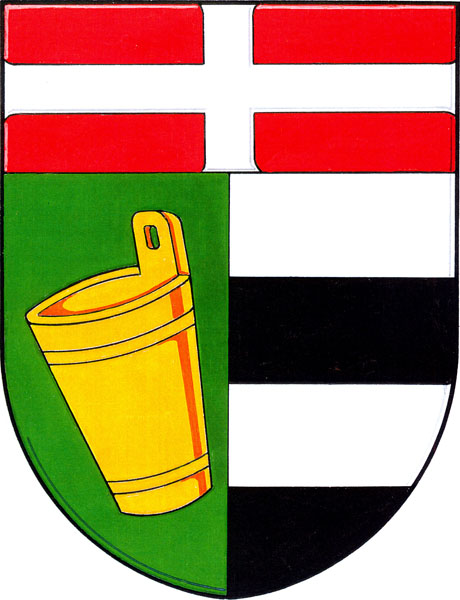
- Flag Coat of arms

- Location in the Czech Republic
- Coordinates: 49°22′0″N 17°32′19″E
- Country: Czech Republic
- Region: Zlín
- District: Kroměříž
- First mentioned: 1376

Area
  - Total: 6.87 km^{2} (2.65 sq mi)
- Elevation: 237 m (778 ft)

Population (2026-01-01)
  - Total: 675
  - Density: 98.3/km^{2} (254/sq mi)
- Time zone: UTC+1 (CET)
  - Summer (DST): UTC+2 (CEST)
- Postal code: 768 43
- Website: www.rosteni.cz

Roštění is a municipality and village in Kroměříž District in the Zlín Region of the Czech Republic. It has about 700 inhabitants.

Roštění lies approximately 13 kilometres (8 mi) north-east of Kroměříž, 18 km (11 mi) north-west of Zlín, and 239 km (149 mi) east of Prague.

== Demographics ==
Historical population
| Year | Pop. | ±% |
|---|---|---|
| 1869 | 749 | — |
| 1880 | 798 | +6.5% |
| 1890 | 880 | +10.3% |
| 1900 | 920 | +4.5% |
| 1910 | 923 | +0.3% |
| 1921 | 925 | +0.2% |
| 1930 | 942 | +1.8% |
| 1950 | 788 | −16.3% |
| 1961 | 798 | +1.3% |
| 1970 | 785 | −1.6% |
| 1980 | 770 | −1.9% |
| 1991 | 717 | −6.9% |
| 2001 | 708 | −1.3% |
| 2011 | 691 | −2.4% |
| 2021 | 643 | −6.9% |
Source: Censuses
