= Sulimov =

- Municipality
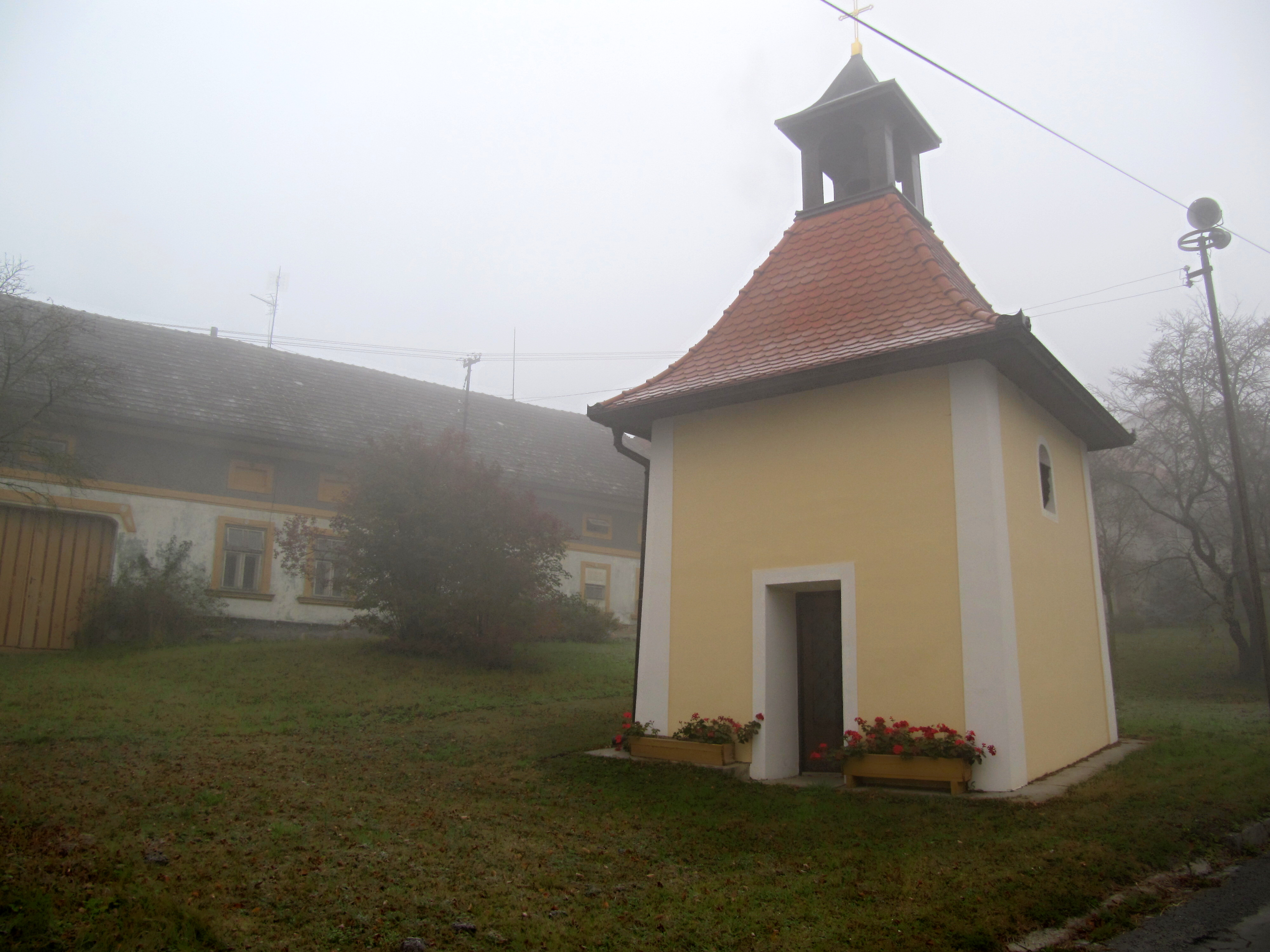
- Belfry

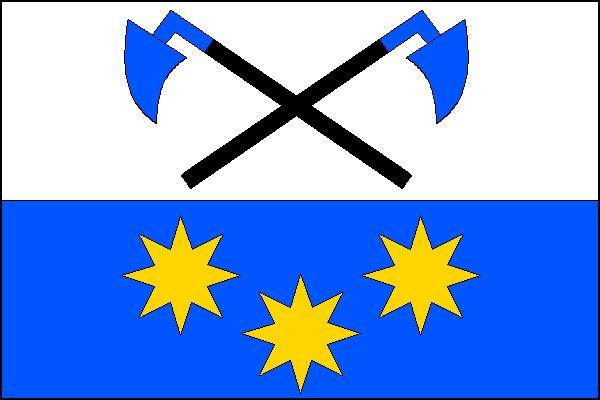
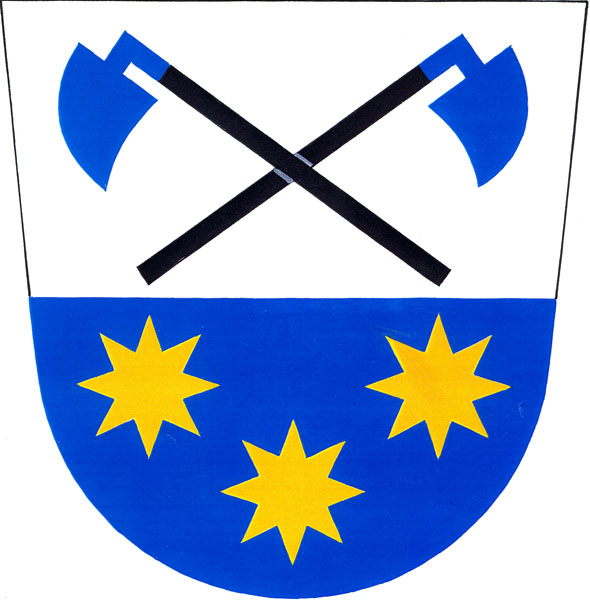
- Flag Coat of arms

- Location in the Czech Republic
- Coordinates: 49°13′36″N 17°25′22″E
- Country: Czech Republic
- Region: Zlín
- District: Kroměříž
- First mentioned: 1353

Area
  - Total: 1.98 km^{2} (0.76 sq mi)
- Elevation: 278 m (912 ft)

Population (2026-01-01)
  - Total: 147
  - Density: 74.2/km^{2} (192/sq mi)
- Time zone: UTC+1 (CET)
  - Summer (DST): UTC+2 (CEST)
- Postal code: 768 21
- Website: www.sulimov.cz

Sulimov is a municipality and village in Kroměříž District in the Zlín Region of the Czech Republic. It has about 100 inhabitants.

== History ==
The first written mention of Sulimov is from 1353.

== Demographics ==
Historical population
Year	Pop.	±%
1869	221	—
1880	237	+7.2%
1890	251	+5.9%
1900	226	−10.0%
1910	232	+2.7%
1921	220	−5.2%
1930	227	+3.2%
1950	218	−4.0%
1961	196	−10.1%
1970	187	−4.6%
1980	176	−5.9%
1991	153	−13.1%
2001	171	+11.8%
2011	166	−2.9%
2021	144	−13.3%
Source: Censuses
