= Počenice-Tetětice =

- Municipality
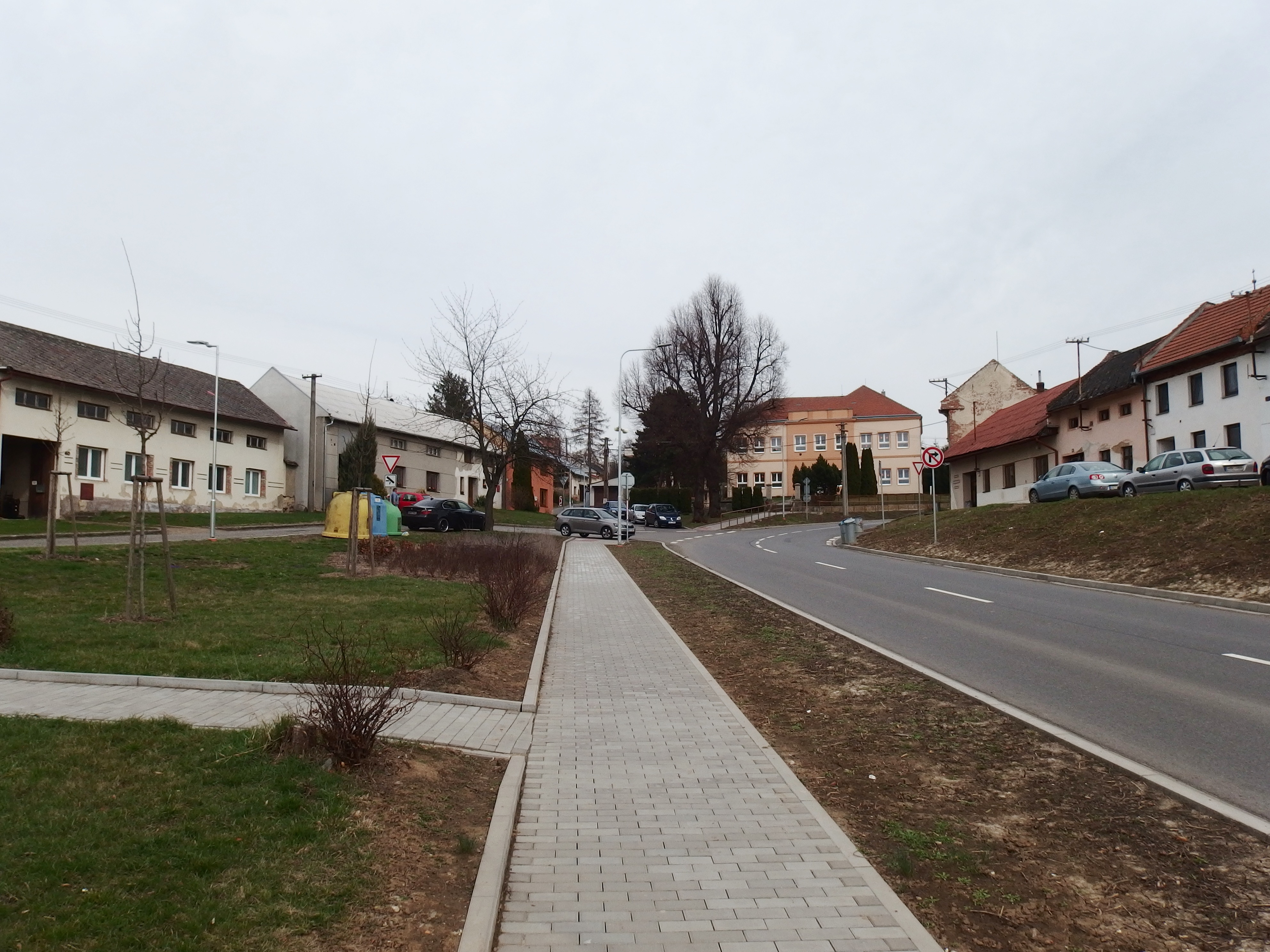
- Centre of Počenice

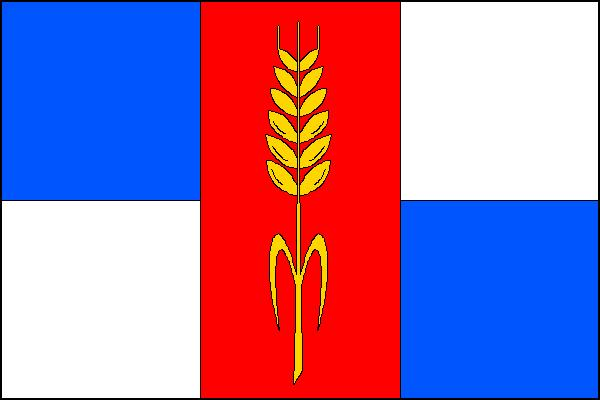
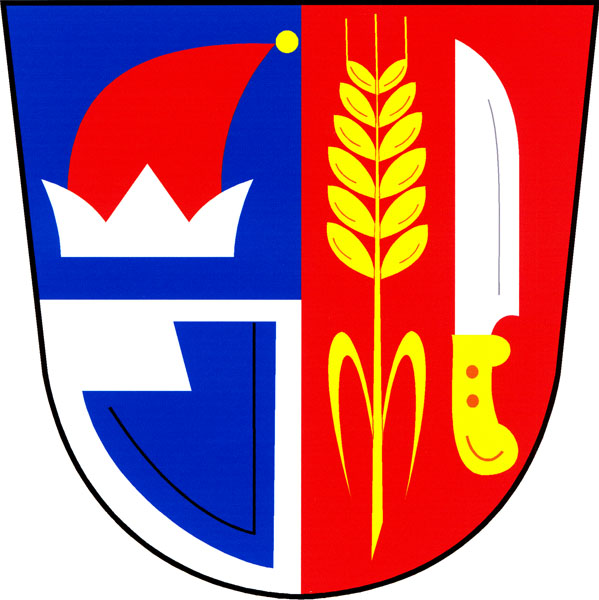
- Flag Coat of arms

- Location in the Czech Republic
- Coordinates: 49°16′11″N 17°13′37″E
- Country: Czech Republic
- Region: Zlín
- District: Kroměříž
- First mentioned: 1283

Area
  - Total: 8.29 km^{2} (3.20 sq mi)
- Elevation: 268 m (879 ft)

Population (2026-01-01)
  - Total: 698
  - Density: 84.2/km^{2} (218/sq mi)
- Time zone: UTC+1 (CET)
  - Summer (DST): UTC+2 (CEST)
- Postal code: 768 33
- Website: www.pocenice.cz

Počenice-Tetětice is a municipality in Kroměříž District in the Zlín Region of the Czech Republic. It has about 700 inhabitants.

Počenice-Tetětice lies approximately 13 kilometres (8 mi) west of Kroměříž, 32 km (20 mi) west of Zlín, and 222 km (138 mi) south-east of Prague.

== Administrative division ==
Počenice-Tetětice consists of two municipal parts (in brackets population according to the 2021 census):

- Počenice (457)
- Tetětice (227)

== Demographics ==
Historical population
Year	Pop.	±%
1869	902	—
1880	1,049	+16.3%
1890	1,068	+1.8%
1900	1,014	−5.1%
1910	1,046	+3.2%
1921	1,068	+2.1%
1930	1,023	−4.2%
1950	828	−19.1%
1961	926	+11.8%
1970	851	−8.1%
1980	780	−8.3%
1991	784	+0.5%
2001	811	+3.4%
2011	724	−10.7%
2021	684	−5.5%
Source: Censuses
