= Jano Köhler =

Czech painter (1873–1941)

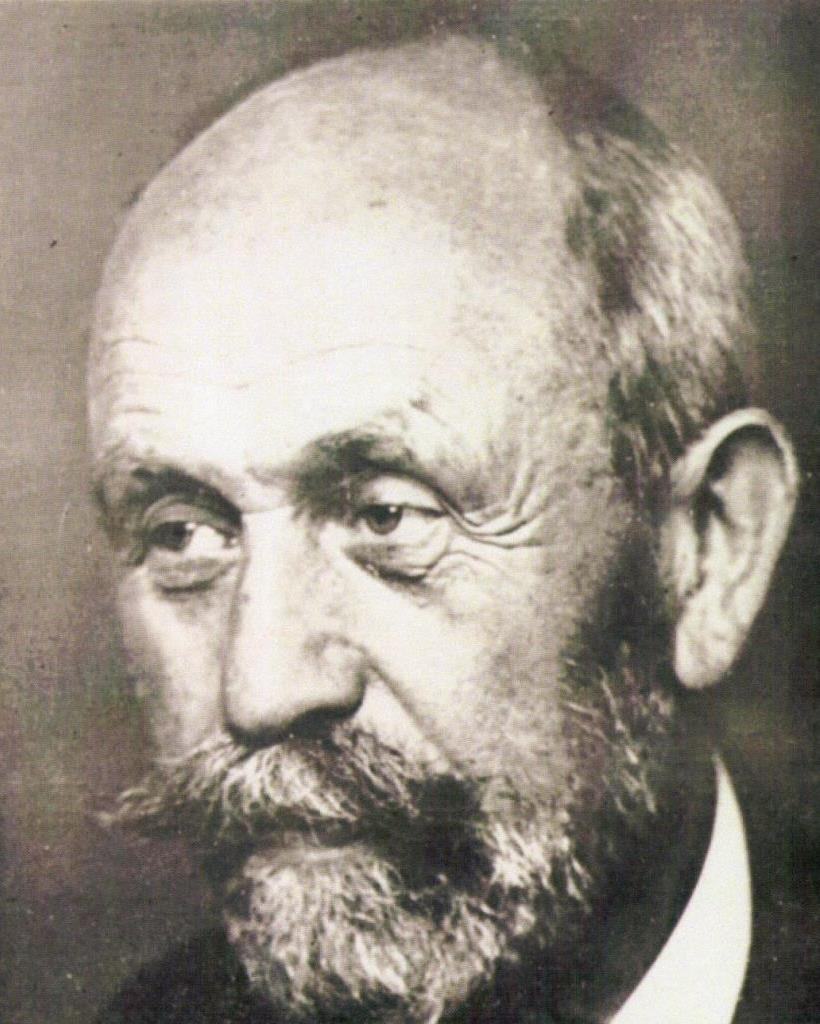
- Jano Köhler
- Born: 9 February 1873; Brno, Moravia, Austria-Hungary
- Died: 20 January 1941 (aged 67); Brno, Protectorate of Bohemia and Moravia
- Known for: Frescoes and sgraffiti
- Awards: Pro Ecclesia et Pontifice (Holy See)

Jano Köhler (sometimes spelled Jano Koehler; 9 February 1873 – 20 January 1941) was a Czech painter. He is known for decorating sacral buildings with frescoes and sgraffiti.

== Life and education ==
Köhler was born in a Czech-German family, but his German father died soon after. He showed interest in fine arts and went to study in Prague. He graduated from Academy of Arts, Architecture and Design (1893–1897) and Academy of Fine Arts (1897–1900). During his studies, he gained valuable experience in the field of monumental painting, especially in the field of frescoes and sgraffiti.

He was student of Kamil Hilbert, Stanislav Sucharda, Felix Jenewein, Otakar Hostinský, František Ženíšek and Maximilian Pirner.

In 1899, he bought a house in Nenkovice where he set up a studio, and moved here in 1901. From 1926 until his death he lived in Strážovice. He died in a hospital in Brno in 1941 and was buried in Strážovice.

== Work ==
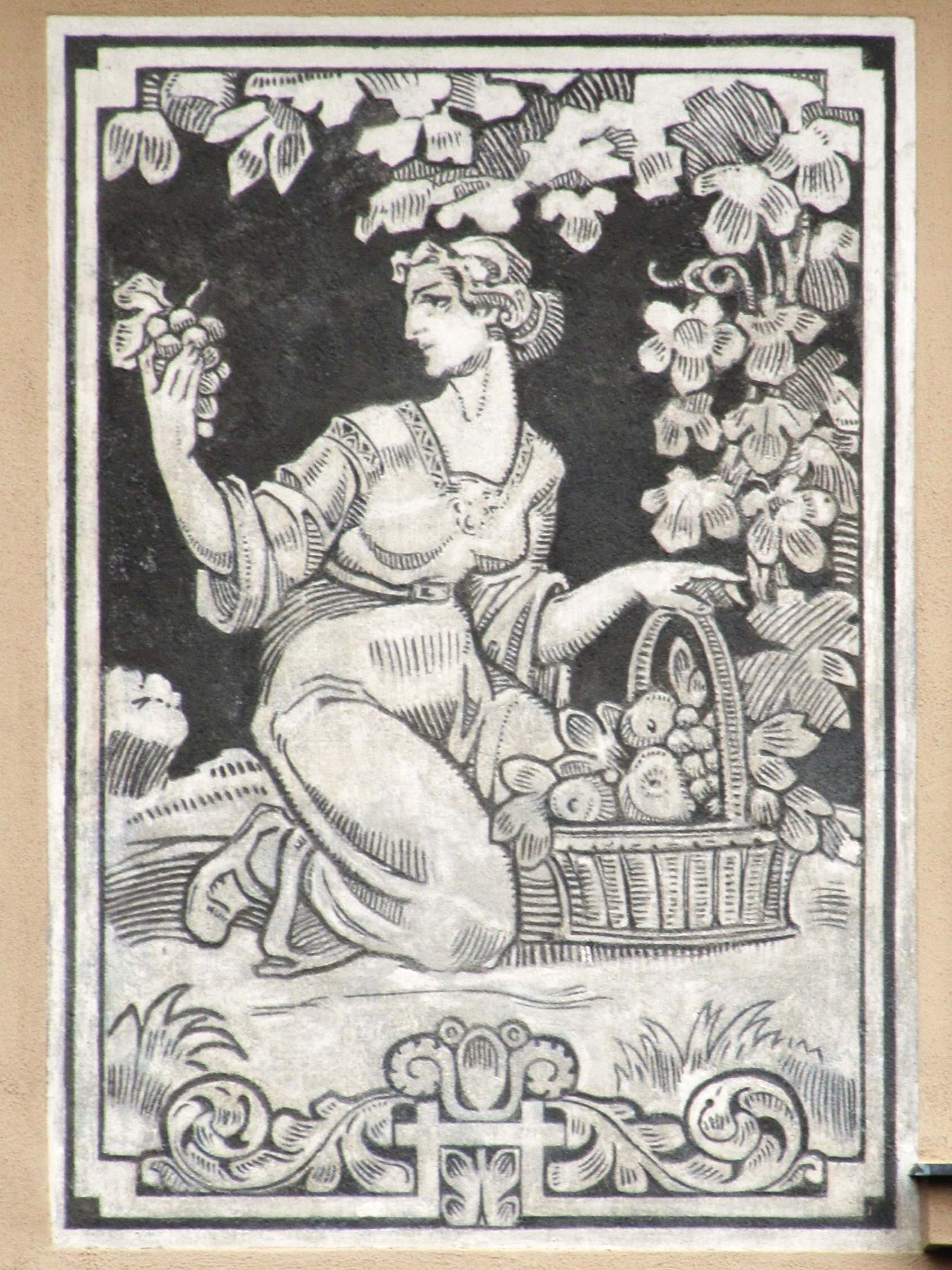
A sgraffito on Kyjov Castle

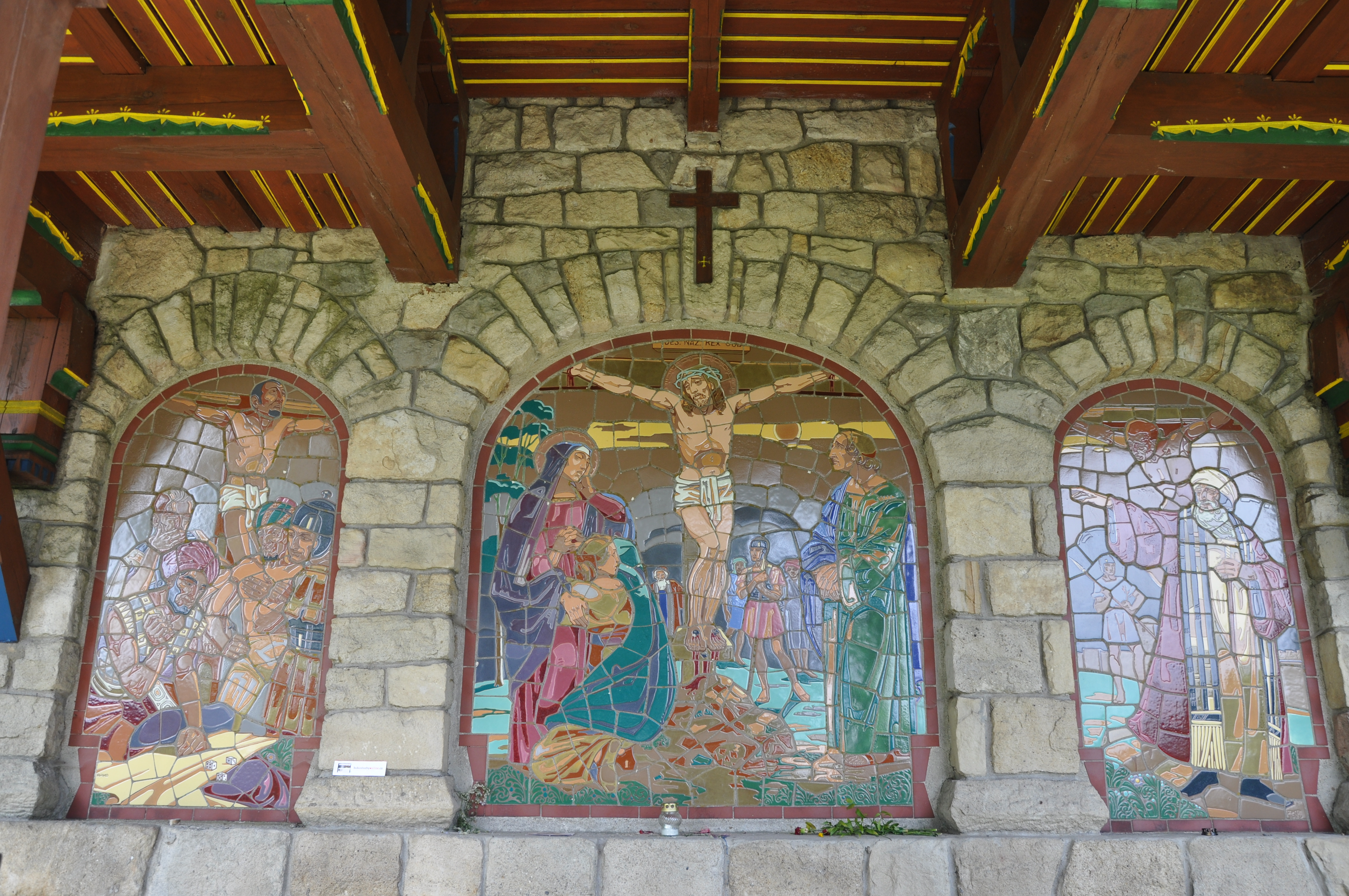
Station of the Cross on Hostýn

Köhler was active mostly in Moravia, but he travelled to work all over the country. He created most of his works in Prostějov, where he received his first contract in 1900 to decorate Prostějov Castle. During his career he decorated 40 churches and 35 secular buildings. His work counts a total of 2,500 works, mostly with a religious focus. He created his own distinctive ornament, drawn from the sources of Moravian folk art.

Köhler specialized in frescoes and sgraffiti, but he also worked with the ceramic mosaic technique. During his life he created or designed 40 mosaic works, including decoration of 11 Stations of the Cross on the pilgrimage Hostýn hill.

During the winter months, when work on the buildings was not possible, he devoted himself to designs for the warmer months, and occasionally dealt with watercolors, oil paintings, drawings, illustrations and graphics.

His notable works include:

In Olomouc Region

- Prostějov: Prostějov Castle – frescoes and sgraffiti; Church of the Exaltation of the Holy Cross – frescoes
- Olomouc: Archbishop's Palace – fresco and sgraffiti; Chapel of Saint Jan Sarkander – frescoes
- Litovel: Gymnasium of Jan Opletal – design of ceramic mosaics with scenes from the history of the town
- Příkazy: Chapel of Saints Cyril and Methodius – decoration of interiors

In Zlín Region

- Luhačovice: Jurkovič House – fresco of Saints Cyril and Methodius; Augustiniánský dům Hotel – frescoes
- Uherské Hradiště: Moravian Slovakia Museum – mosaic allegory of the seasons
- Napajedla: town hall – ceramic mosaic; Church of Saint Bartholomew – decoration of interiors
- Uherský Ostroh: bell tower – sgraffiti
- Bystřice pod Hostýnem: Church of Saint Giles – frescoes
- Chvalčov: 11 Stations of the Cross on the Hostýn hill – ceramic mosaic

In South Moravian Region

- Kyjov: Church of the Assumption of the Virgin Mary – sgraffiti; Kyjov Castle – sgraffiti
- Tišnov: Town hall – sgraffiti
- Blatnice pod Svatým Antonínkem: Chapel of Saint Anthony of Padua – two murals
- Oslnovice: Chapel of the Sacred Heart – decoration of interiors

In other Czech regions

- Štramberk: Church of Saint John of Nepomuk – decoration of interiors
- Semily: Obecní dům – ceramic mosaic

== Awards ==
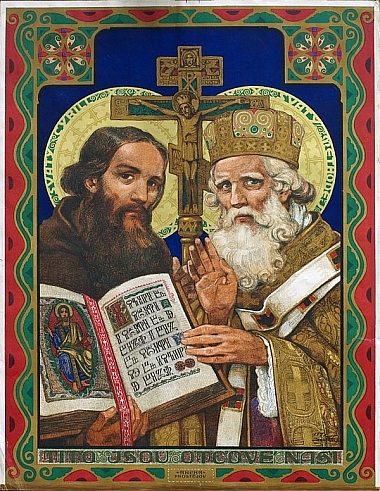
Lithography of Saints Cyril and Methodius

In 1928, Köhler was awarded Pro Ecclesia et Pontifice decoration by the pope for the lithography of Saints Cyril and Methodius in Prostějov, which also appeared on postage stamps.

== Legacy ==
Streets in Prostějov-Vrahovice and in Kyjov were named after him. There is a permanent museum exhibition about his life and work in Nenkovice.

A documentary film about work of Jano Köhler was filmed in 2016.

== Gallery ==
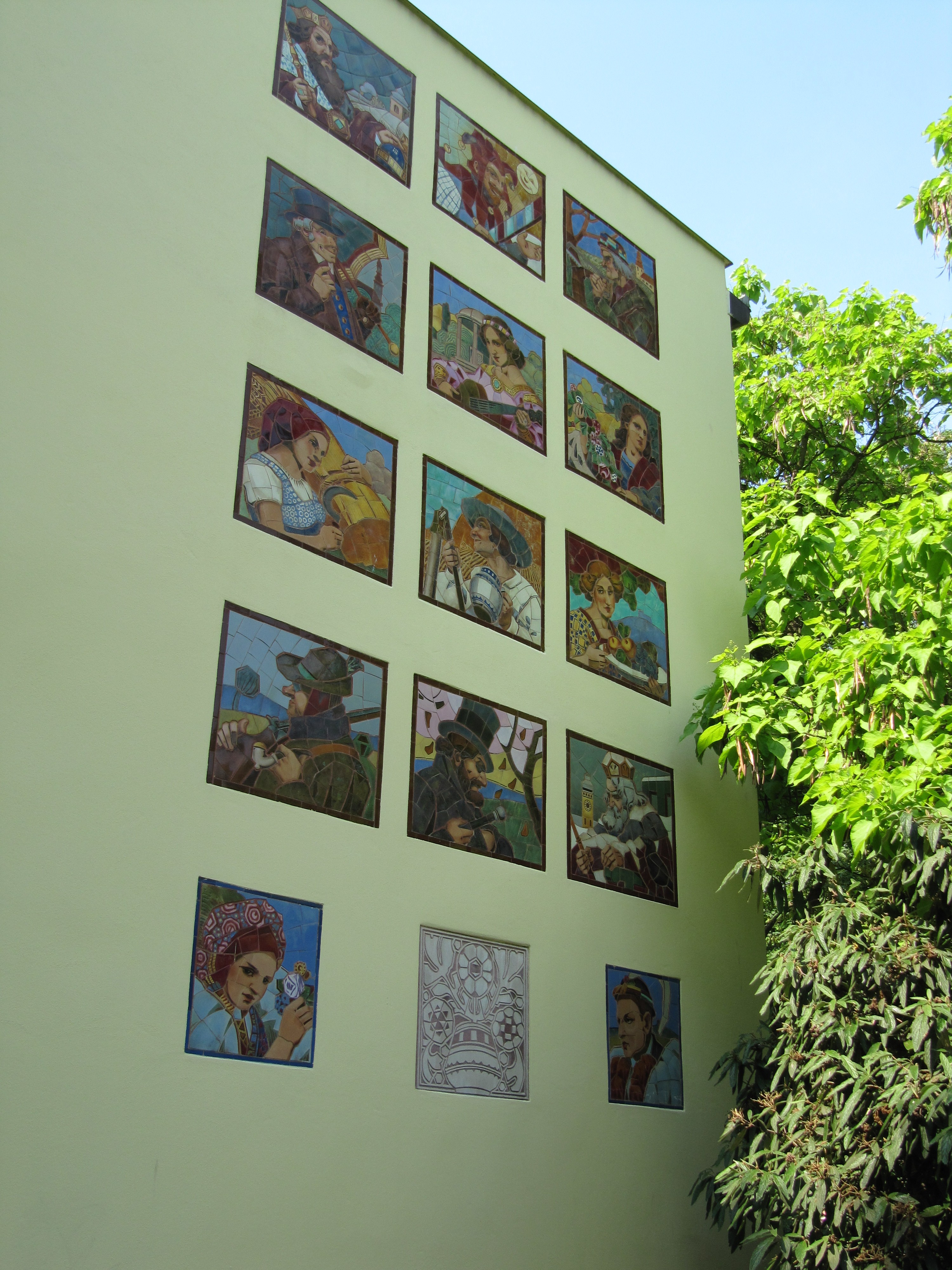
Moravian Slovakia Museum in Uherské Hradiště

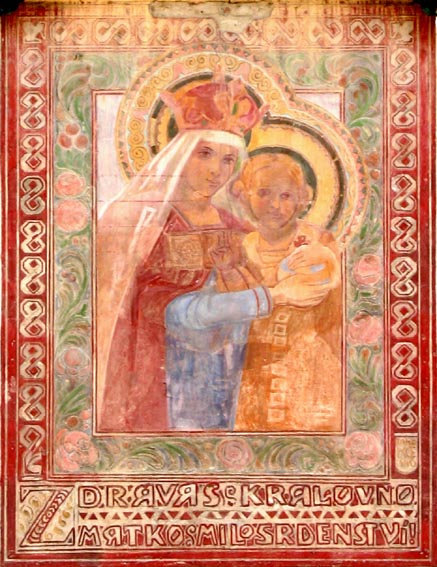
Sgraffito on Church of the Assumption of the Virgin Mary in Kyjov

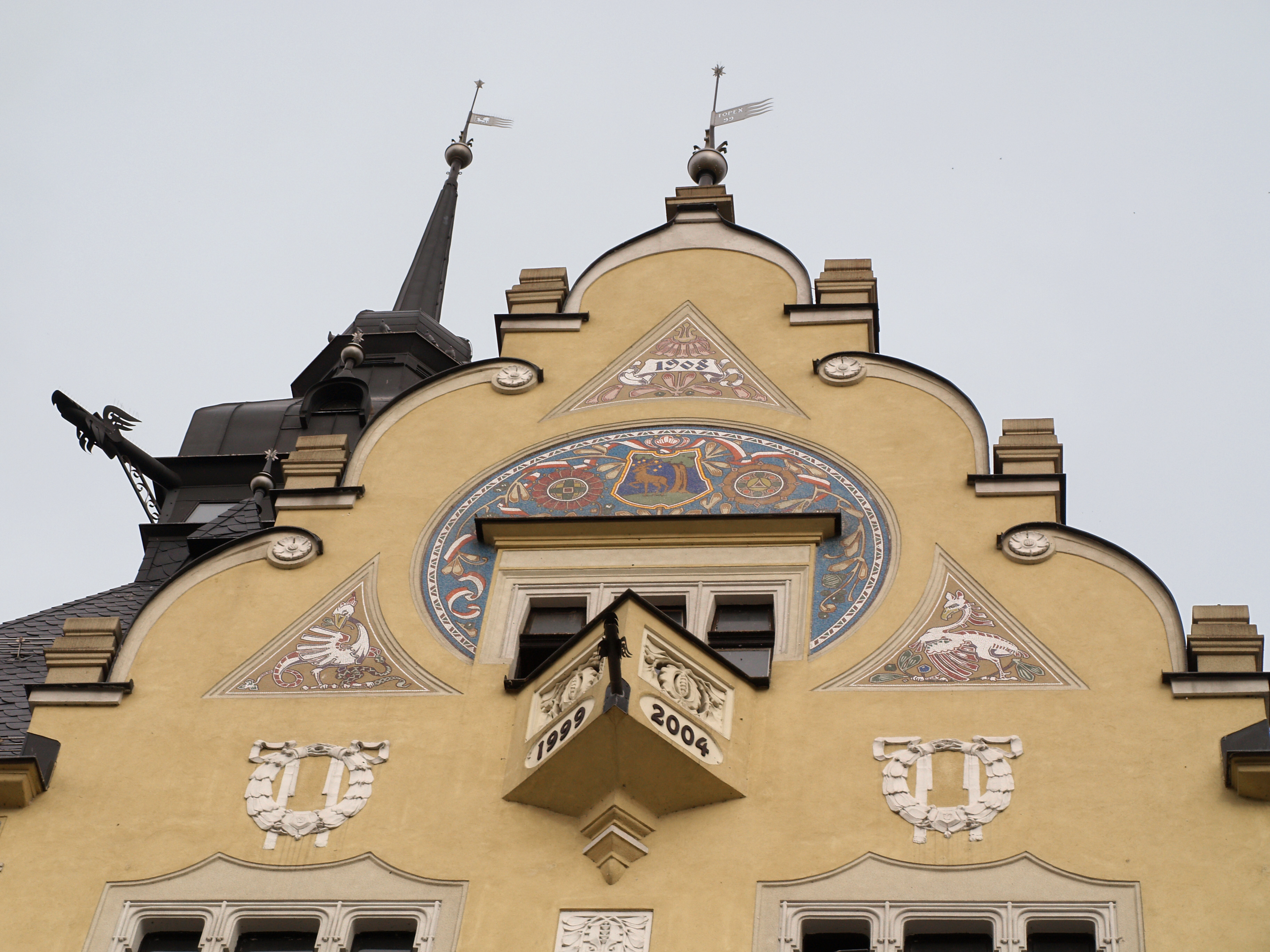
Mosaic on Obecní dům in Semily
