= Voříšek =

Voříšek (feminine Voříšková) is a Czech surname. Notable persons with the surname include:

- Jan Václav (Hugo) Voříšek (1791–1825), Czech composer
- Dick Vorisek (1918–1989), American sound engineer
- Petr Voříšek (born 1979), Czech footballer
- Ondřej Voříšek (1986–2004), Czech footballer
- Tereza Voříšková, birth name of Tereza Ramba (born 1989), Czech film and television actress
