= Bystřice pod Hostýnem =

- Town
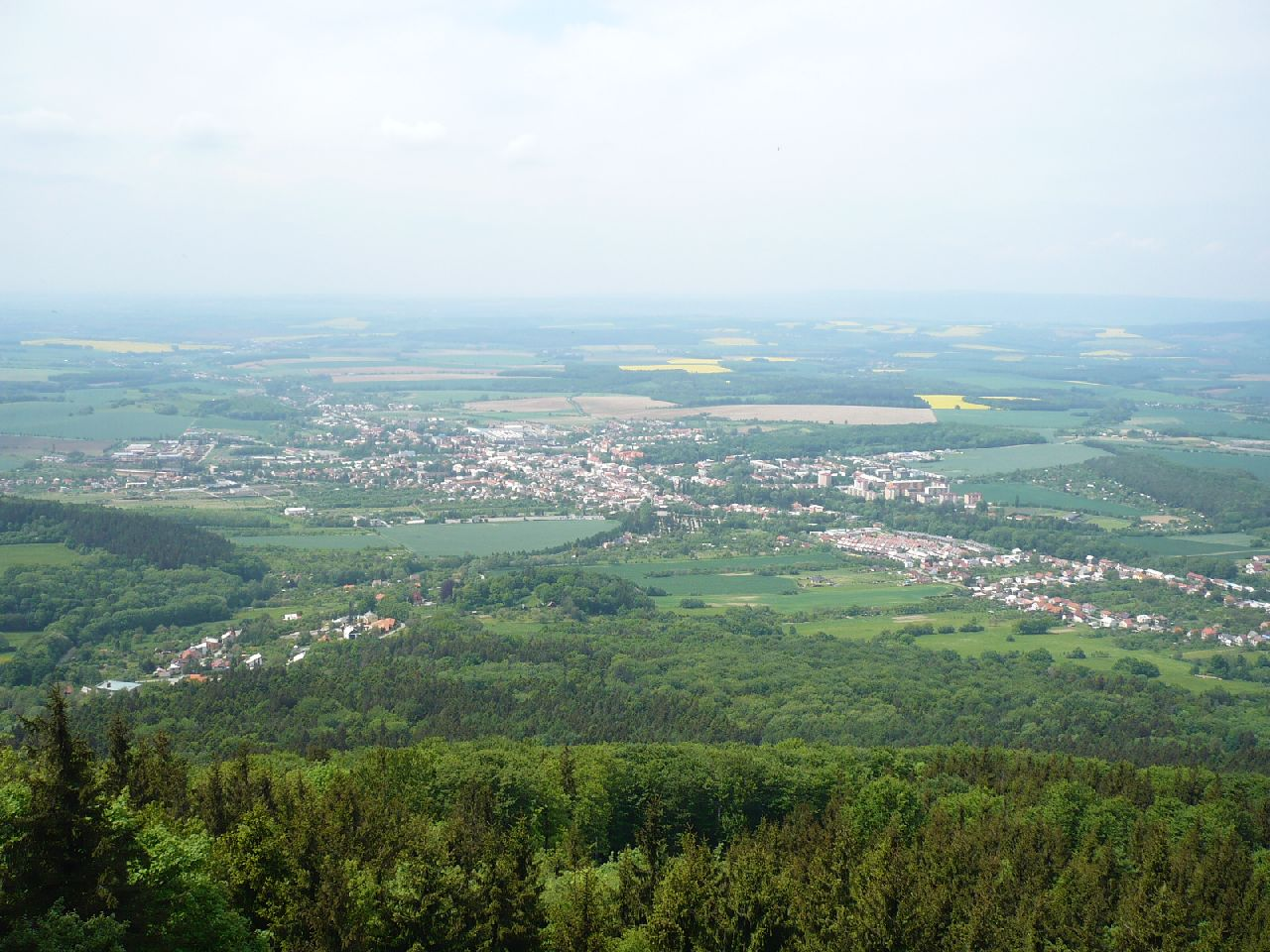
- The town seen from the Hostýn hill

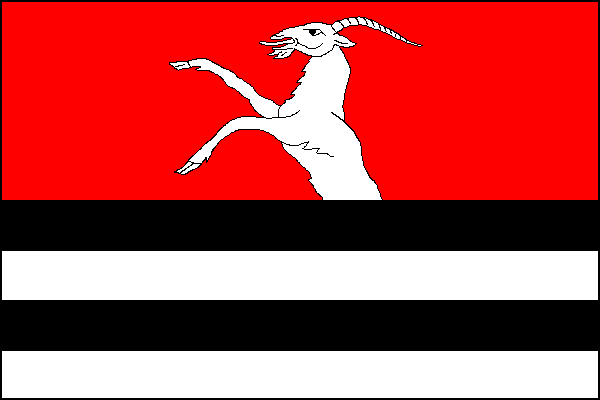
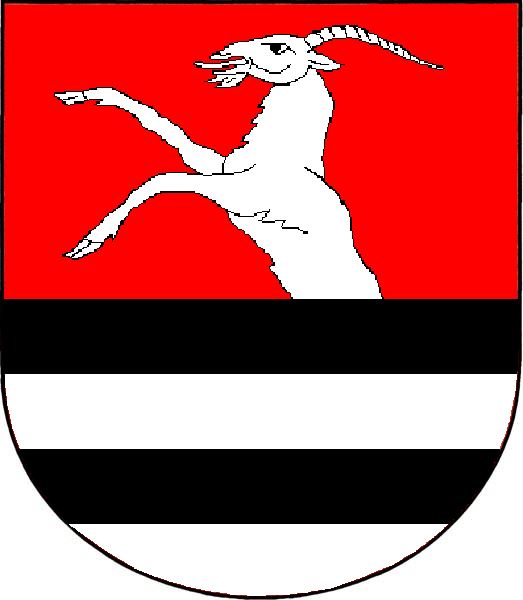
- Flag Coat of arms

- Location in the Czech Republic
- Coordinates: 49°23′57″N 17°40′27″E
- Country: Czech Republic
- Region: Zlín
- District: Kroměříž
- First mentioned: 1368

Government
  - Mayor: Jaromír Šallé

Area
  - Total: 26.81 km^{2} (10.35 sq mi)
- Elevation: 315 m (1,033 ft)

Population (2026-01-01)
  - Total: 7,911
  - Density: 295.1/km^{2} (764.2/sq mi)
- Time zone: UTC+1 (CET)
  - Summer (DST): UTC+2 (CEST)
- Postal code: 768 61
- Website: www.bystriceph.cz

Bystřice pod Hostýnem (Czech pronunciation: [ˈbɪstr̝̊ɪtsɛ ˈpod ɦostiːnɛm]; German: Bistritz am Hostein) is a town in Kroměříž District in the Zlín Region of the Czech Republic. It has about 7,900 inhabitants. The town is located on the Bystřička Stream in the Moravian-Silesian Foothills. It is known for the bentwood furniture manufacturer TON.

Bystřice pod Hostýnem was founded in the 14th century at the latest and became a town in 1864. The main landmark of the town is the Bystřice pod Hostýnem Castle.

== Administrative division ==
Bystřice pod Hostýnem consists of five municipal parts (in brackets population according to the 2021 census):

- Bystřice pod Hostýnem (6,270)
- Bílavsko (258)
- Hlinsko pod Hostýnem (290)
- Rychlov (913)
- Sovadina (130)

== Geography ==
Bystřice pod Hostýnem is located about 23 kilometres (14 mi) northeast of Kroměříž and 19 km (12 mi) north of Zlín. It lies in the Moravian-Silesian Foothills. The Bystřička Stream flows through the town. The hill Hostýn, whose name is included in the name of the town, is located south of the town outside of the municipal territory, but the contour line below the hill at 460 m (1,509 ft) above sea level is the highest point of Bystřice pod Hostýnem.

== History ==
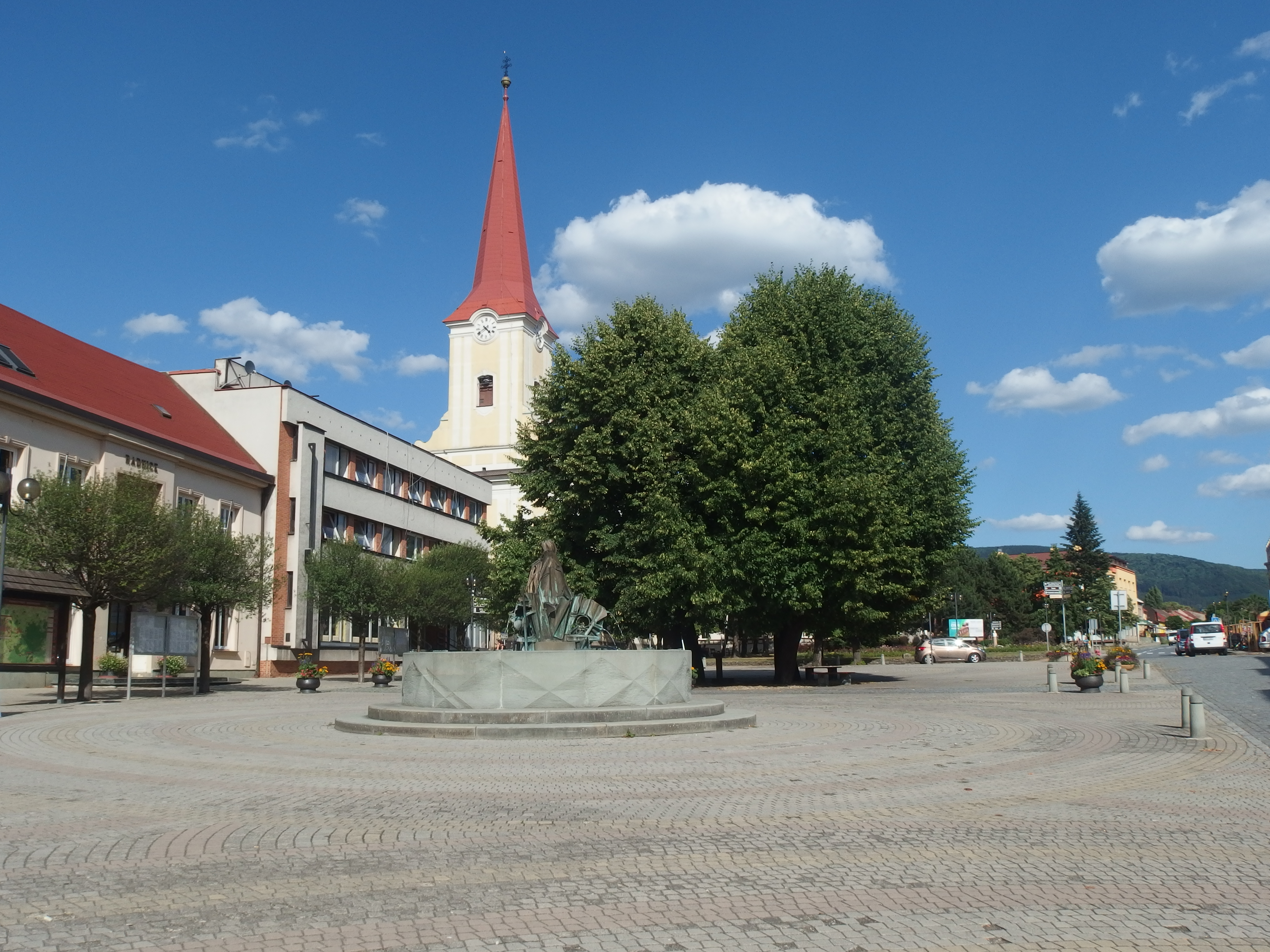
The square Masarykovo náměstí

The first written mention of Bystřice is from 1368, when the settlement was acquired by Boček I of Poděbrady. A fortress was first mentioned here in 1440. From 1650 to 1827, the estate was owned by the Rottal family. The last owners were the Loudouns, the descendants of Ernst Gideon von Laudon, who held the castle until 1933.

In the mid-19th century, a spa was here. In 1861, German industrialists Michael Thonet and his son August established the largest factory for bentwood furniture in Europe here. Industrialisation meant the greatest economic development of Bystřice pod Hostýnem and the influx of new inhabitants. In 1864, the municipality was promoted to a town. The railway was built in 1882.

== Demographics ==
Historical population

Year	Pop.	±%
1869	3,368	—
1880	4,120	+22.3%
1890	5,088	+23.5%
1900	5,438	+6.9%
1910	6,162	+13.3%

Year	Pop.	±%
1921	5,820	−5.6%
1930	6,049	+3.9%
1950	6,452	+6.7%
1961	7,252	+12.4%
1970	7,605	+4.9%

Year	Pop.	±%
1980	8,462	+11.3%
1991	8,441	−0.2%
2001	8,787	+4.1%
2011	8,186	−6.8%
2021	7,861	−4.0%

Source: Censuses

== Economy ==
The bentwood furniture factory Thonet, founded in 1861, still operates and is the oldest factory of its kind in the world. In 1953, the company was renamed TON (Továrny na ohýbaný nábytek, i.e. 'bentwood furniture factories'). It is the largest employer based in the town with more than 250 employees and one of the largest industrial employers in the region.

== Transport ==
Bystřice pod Hostýnem is located on the railway line Rožnov pod Radhoštěm–Kojetín.

== Sights ==
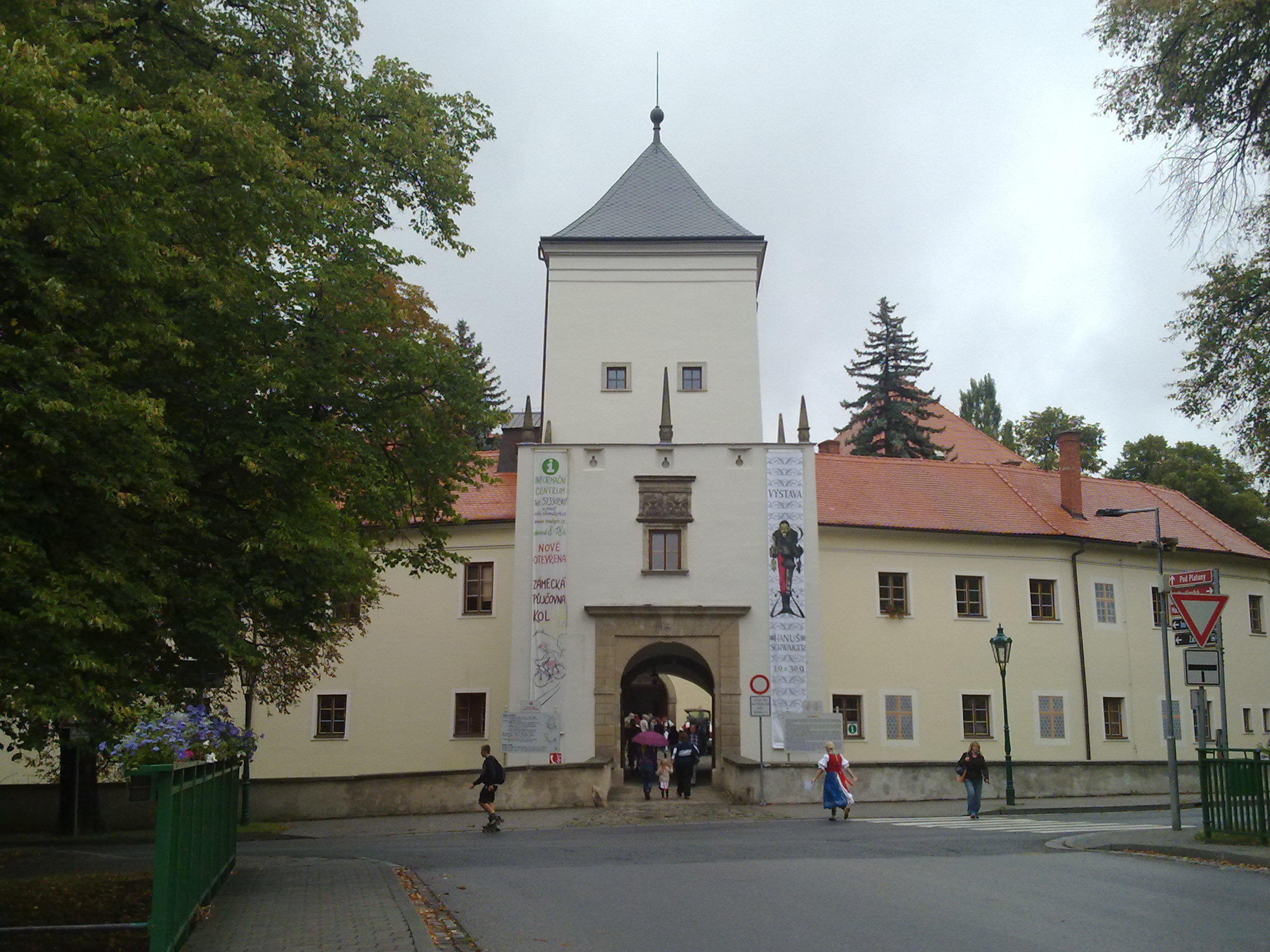
Bystřice pod Hostýnem Castle

The local Gothic fortress was rebuilt into a Renaissance castle probably in the mid-16th century. After it was damaged by fire, it was reconstructed in 1616. In the mid 18th century, two Neoclassical wings were added to the old castle. The last building modification was the extension of the so-called toilet tower in 1889. Today the Bystřice pod Hostýnem Castle is property of the town and is houses the town museum, cultural spaces, and part of the municipal office.

The Church of Saint Giles was built in 1744. The church was painted and frescoed by Jano Köhler, but only some of the original paintings have been preserved.

== Notable people ==
- František Sušil (1804–1868), priest and folk music collector; died here
- Jakob Ehrlich (1877–1938), early Zionist leader
- Bohuslav Fuchs (1895–1972), modernist architect; worked here
- Jaroslav Kozlík (1907–2012), educator, theorist of education and volleyball player
- Šárka Jelínková (born 1968), politician

== Twin towns – sister cities ==
Bystřice pod Hostýnem is twinned with:

- Salzkotten, Germany
- San Giovanni al Natisone, Italy
