= Blatnice pod Svatým Antonínkem =

- Municipality
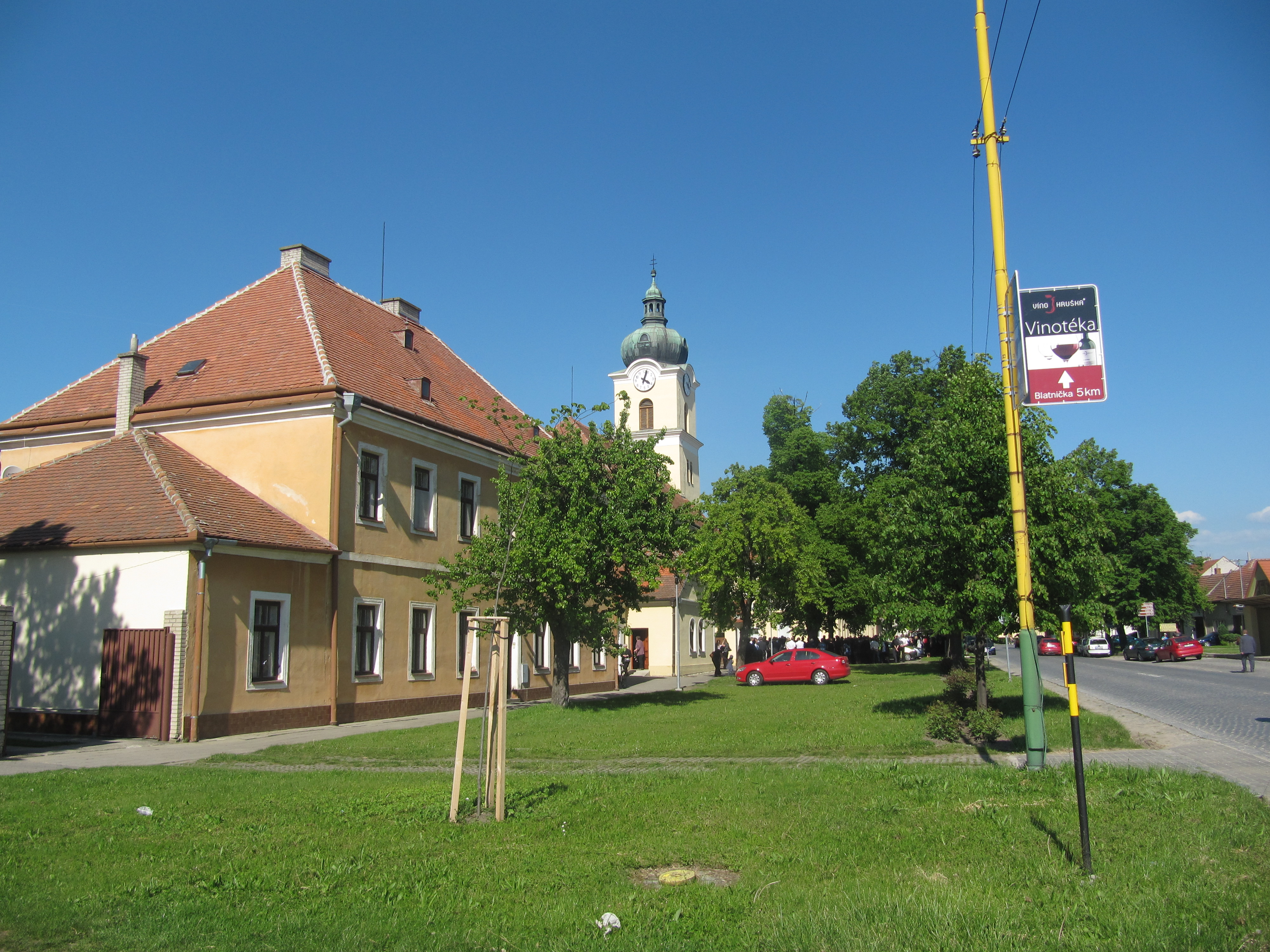
- Main street

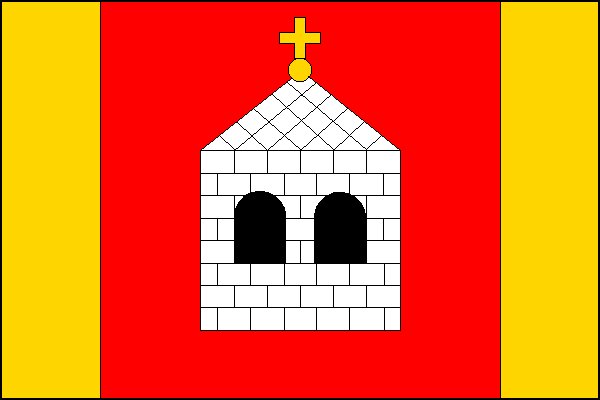
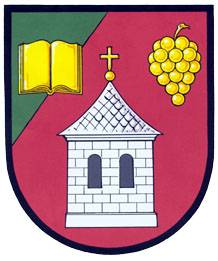
- Flag Coat of arms

- Location in the Czech Republic
- Coordinates: 48°56′48″N 17°27′57″E
- Country: Czech Republic
- Region: South Moravian
- District: Hodonín
- First mentioned: 1046

Area
  - Total: 13.91 km^{2} (5.37 sq mi)
- Elevation: 214 m (702 ft)

Population (2026-01-01)
  - Total: 1,870
  - Density: 134/km^{2} (348/sq mi)
- Time zone: UTC+1 (CET)
  - Summer (DST): UTC+2 (CEST)
- Postal code: 696 71
- Website: www.obecblatnice.cz

Blatnice pod Svatým Antonínkem is a municipality and village in Hodonín District in the South Moravian Region of the Czech Republic. It has about 1,900 inhabitants.

== Geography ==
Blatnice pod Svatým Antonínkem is located about 26 kilometres (16 mi) northeast of Hodonín and 34 km (21 mi) southwest of Zlín. It lies in the Vizovice Highlands. The highest point is the hill Střečkův kopec at 361 m (1,184 ft) above sea level. The Svodnice Stream flows through the municipality.

== History ==
The first written mention of Blatnice pod Svatým Antonínkem is from 1046. The settlement was situated along a trade route. The first mentions of the local wine production are from the late 13th and early 14th centuries.

== Demographics ==
Historical population

Year	Pop.	±%
1869	1,591	—
1880	1,790	+12.5%
1890	2,003	+11.9%
1900	2,230	+11.3%
1910	2,335	+4.7%

Year	Pop.	±%
1921	2,184	−6.5%
1930	2,129	−2.5%
1950	2,228	+4.7%
1961	2,393	+7.4%
1970	2,299	−3.9%

Year	Pop.	±%
1980	2,106	−8.4%
1991	2,227	+5.7%
2001	2,163	−2.9%
2011	2,014	−6.9%
2021	1,865	−7.4%

Source: Censuses

== Economy ==
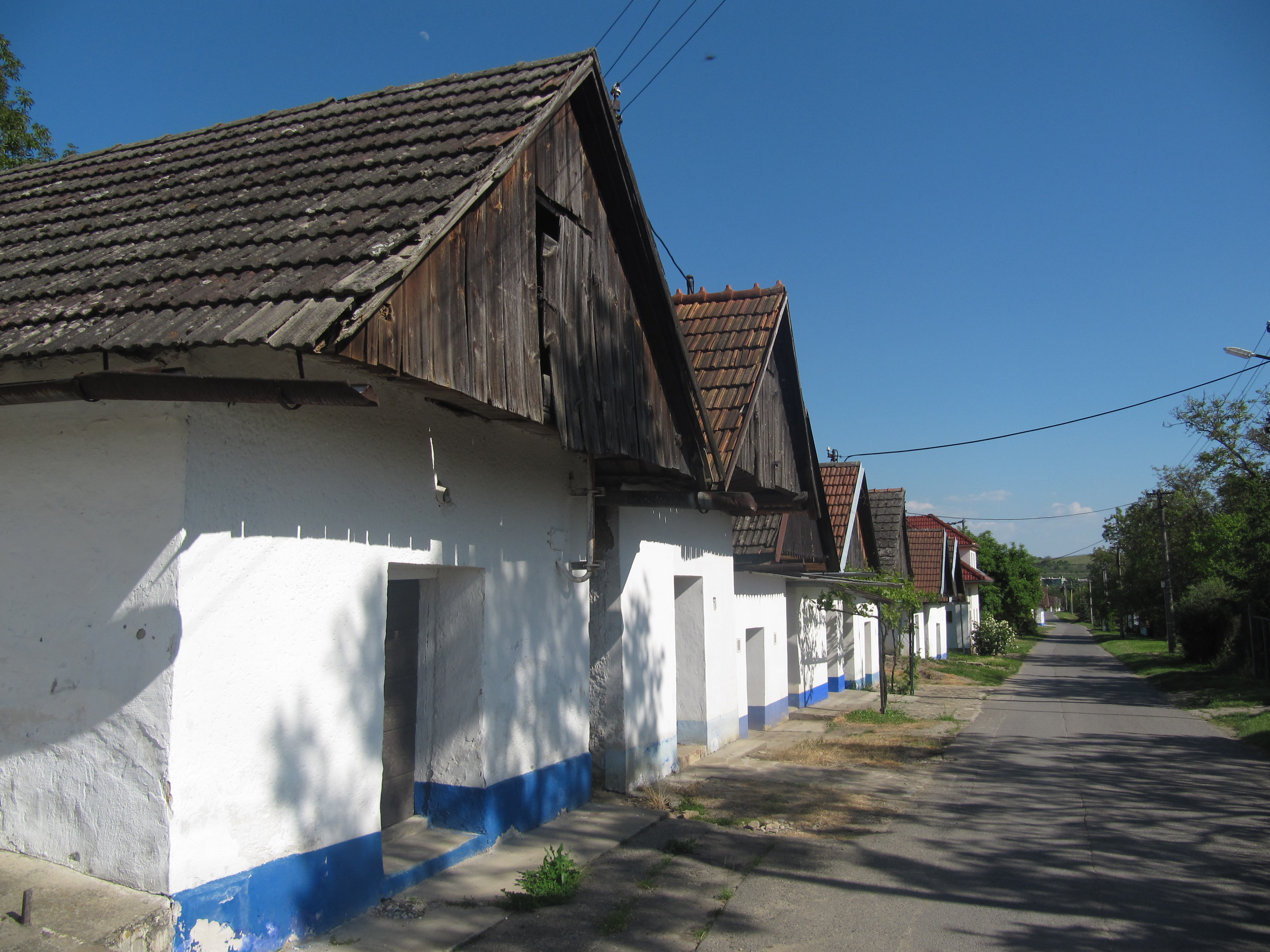
Búdy buildings

The area of Blatnice pod Svatým Antonínkem is known for viticulture and winemaking. It lies in the Slovácká wine subregion. The municipality has a rich tradition and has its own brand of wine Blatnický Roháč.

== Transport ==
In the centre of the village is the intersection of two main roads: the I/54 (the section from Veselí nad Moravou to the Czech–Slovak border in Strání) and the I/71 (from Uherský Ostroh to the Czech–Slovak border in Velká nad Veličkou).

== Sights ==
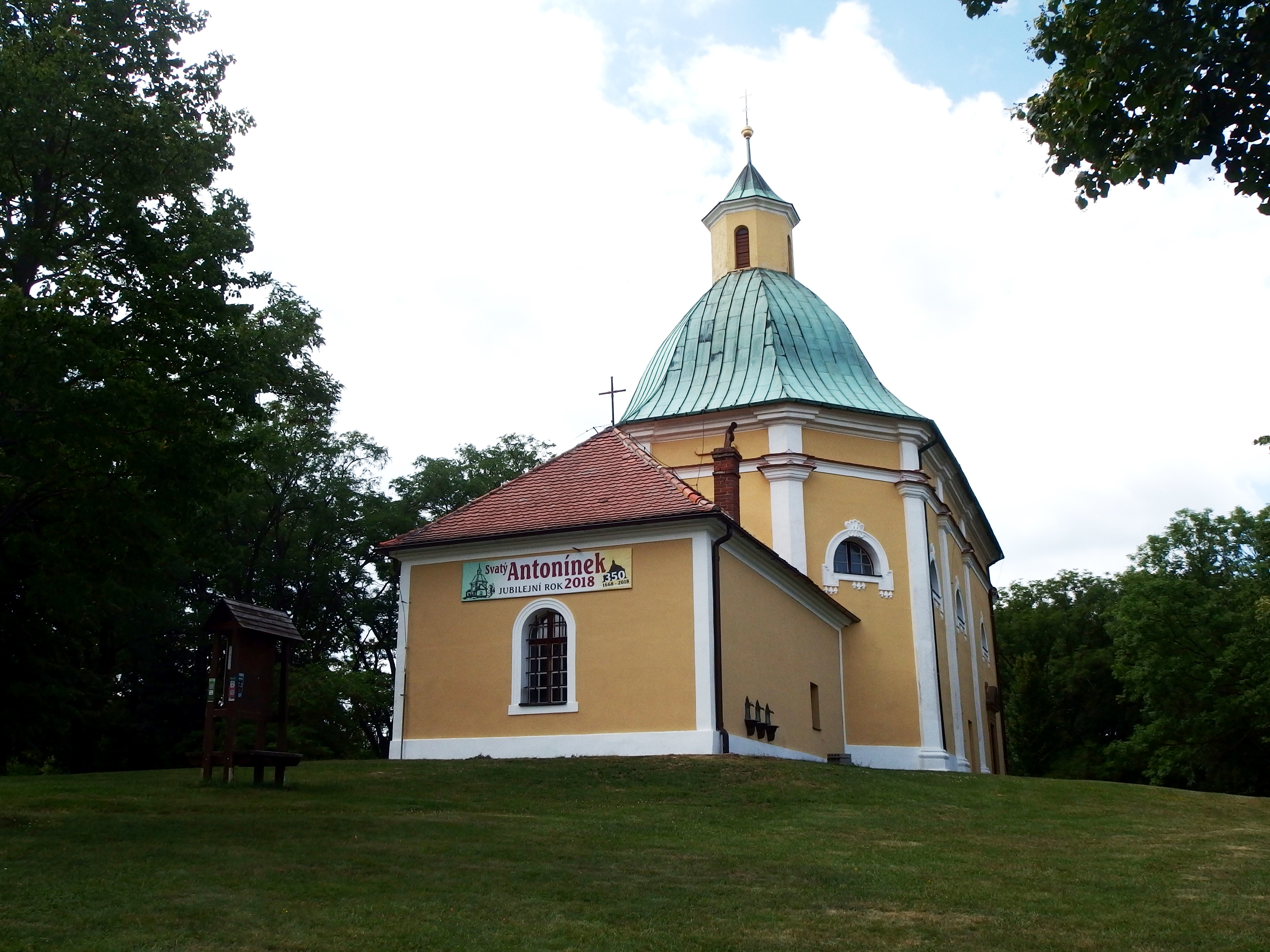
Chapel of Saint Anthony of Padua

The wine is produced in traditional vineyard buildings of folk architecture – búdy, which are above-ground cellars and presses. The oldest were built at the end of the 16th and at the beginning of the 17th century. The area with búdy is protected as a village monument zone.

In the village centre is the Church of Saint Andrew. The current building was built in 1714–1717, when it replaced an older church from 1480. The prismatic tower contains a Renaissance core from the original church.

The hill Antonínský kopec above the village with the small Chapel of Saint Anthony of Padua is the main pilgrimage site in Moravian Slovakia. The chapel was built in 1688 and contains two murals painted by Jano Köhler. A part of the pilgrimage complex are the Stations of the Cross.
