= Krones (surname) =

Krones is a surname. Notable people with the surname include:

- Franz Krones, Austrian historian
- Hartmut Krones, Austrian musicologist
- Therese Krones (1801–1830), Austrian actress
