= Jakob Ehrlich =

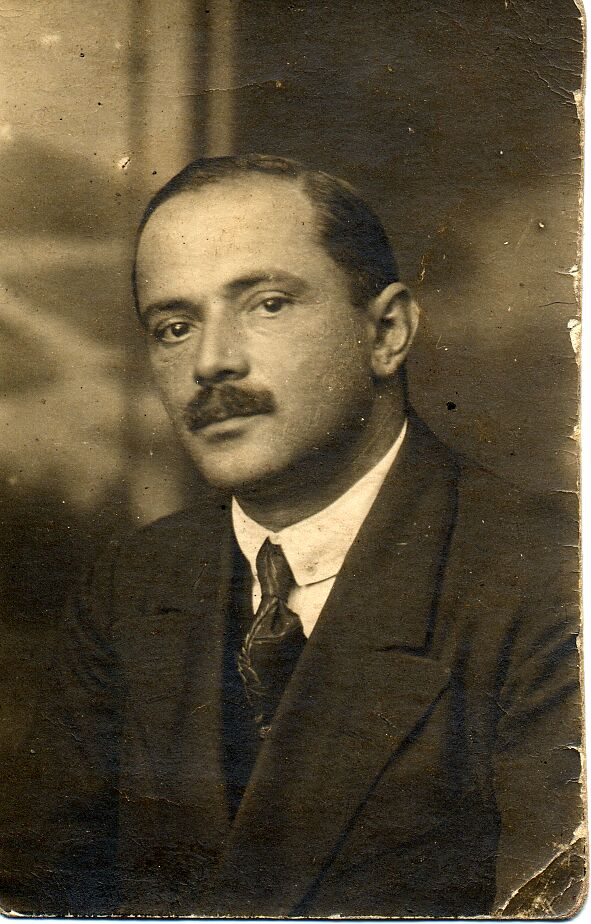
- Jakob Ehrlich in c. 1930
- Born: 15 September 1877; Bystřice pod Hostýnem, Austria-Hungary
- Died: 17 May 1938 (aged 60); Dachau concentration camp, Bavaria, Nazi Germany

Jakob Ehrlich (15 September 1877 – 17 May 1938) was an early Zionist and leader of the Jewish Community in Vienna, Austria. Ehrlich represented the city's 180,000 Jewish citizens in the city government before World War II, and was among those deported in the "Prominententransport" to the Nazi concentration camp at Dachau, soon after the German army entered Vienna in March 1938. He died in Dachau a few weeks later, from beatings. His wife, Irma Hutter Ehrlich emigrated to England, then the USA with their son where she was active in the rescue of Jewish children from Europe, working with WIZO and Hadassah.

== Biography ==
=== Zionist movement ===
Ehrlich was born in Bystřice pod Hostýnem (Bistritz am Hostein) in Moravia, Austria-Hungary. As a youth, he joined Herzl's Zionist organization, and went on to study law in Vienna, where he joined the Jewish-academic fraternity "Ivria". As a young man, he traveled widely through Moravia, Bohemia, and Austria, speaking on the vision of modern Zionism and helping to organize Zionist groups.

In 1908 he returned to Vienna, passed the law examination, and the following year was listed as a barrister. He was a persuasive speaker and an energetic organizer, and soon had increased Zionist representation from one seat to three in the Jewish Kultusgemeinde. In 1913, the 11th Zionist Congress met in Vienna. On the request of Weizmann, Ehrlich was selected as Vice-President of the congress.

In World War I, Ehrlich served as an Austrian officer, and after long service at the front was transferred as Chief Auditor to Odessa where a group of young Jews had been charged with revolutionary activities, and sentenced to death by a military court. Ehrlich showed the charges to be groundless. Among the young men saved was a son of the Zionist engineer Menachem Ussishkin, with whom Ehrlich later worked in Vienna, despite some differences in ideology.

After the war, the Viennese City Council was restored. Ehrlich was at the top of the Jewish Nationalist roster of three candidates – Ehrlich, Plaschkes, and Pollack-Parnau. Before the Council he spoke against injustices to Jewish citizenry, with examples and statistics. The council listened, rarely interrupting with heckling. One of the principal reasons for his large following was his incessant and successful fight for the naturalization of the Jews streaming into Vienna during the wars in Galicia and other provinces.

=== Zionist conference organizer ===
The 14th World Zionist Conference opened in August 1925, in Vienna's Concert Hall. As a member of the city government, Ehrlich welcomed the Congress on behalf of the government. As a representative of the Austrian Ministry, he had to minimize the threat from the Nazi horde, though he knew the danger of the situation. Weizmann and his wife rode through taunting crowds, accompanied by a police escort from their hotel to the conference hall. The hall itself was protected by groups from the Jewish youth federations, and other groups of students and workers. In his inaugural address Ehrlich reminded the delegates of the 11th Zionist Congress, 12 years earlier in Vienna. Since then, the Hebrew University of Jerusalem had been established and steps taken to enable further development, in addition to other initiatives. "Despite a five-year war, despite the terrible post-war period, despite emergencies and deaths, this plan was carried out, and if the torch which was ignited in Jerusalem is carried forward, as the hearts of all humanity pray, to be one in love and aspirations, then the fourteenth congress will take a place of honor in our movement. So I hope that this, our fourteenth Congress, will also be blessed with success and that its deliberations lay the path forward to become a free people among free peoples, for our own happiness and the welfare of all mankind."

In the year 1933, shortly after the seizure of power by the Nazi party in Germany, Ehrlich made a visit to Palestine. He was enthused by much that he saw, but also disappointed by the raw reality of the harsh conditions. Nevertheless, he took the precaution to acquire immigration visas for his family and a group of friends. That plan was not executed however, due to the reservations of some of the proposed group.

=== Anti-fascist ===
In 1938, Ehrlich was the official representative for the city's Jews in Vienna's City Government. He brought international attention to the growing strength of Austrian fascism with a masterful and widely reported speech delivered during the annual budget debate. In that speech he showed how each of the individual laws and regulations passed by the anti-semites of the city council, and each hypocritical encroachments on the rights of Jewish citizens, also damaged the overall integrity of government and the rule of law. The speech was printed in all the larger foreign newspapers with lively supportive commentary. The German press, too, reported the speech; and Julius Streichers Nazi paper Der Stürmer printed a furious attack. Ehrlich's caricature occupied the entire front page with the headline: "What is the Jew Ehrlich up to in Vienna's German Council?"

A few months later the German army was welcomed into Vienna, and Ehrlich was arrested on a spurious charge of trying to organize armed resistance against the Nazis. A few weeks later his body was returned in a sealed coffin. He is buried in Vienna's Jewish cemetery. A memorial plaque for members of the Vienna municipal council killed in the Nazi period, among them Jakob Ehrlich, was installed in the Vienna town hall in 1988.
