= Strážovice =

- Municipality
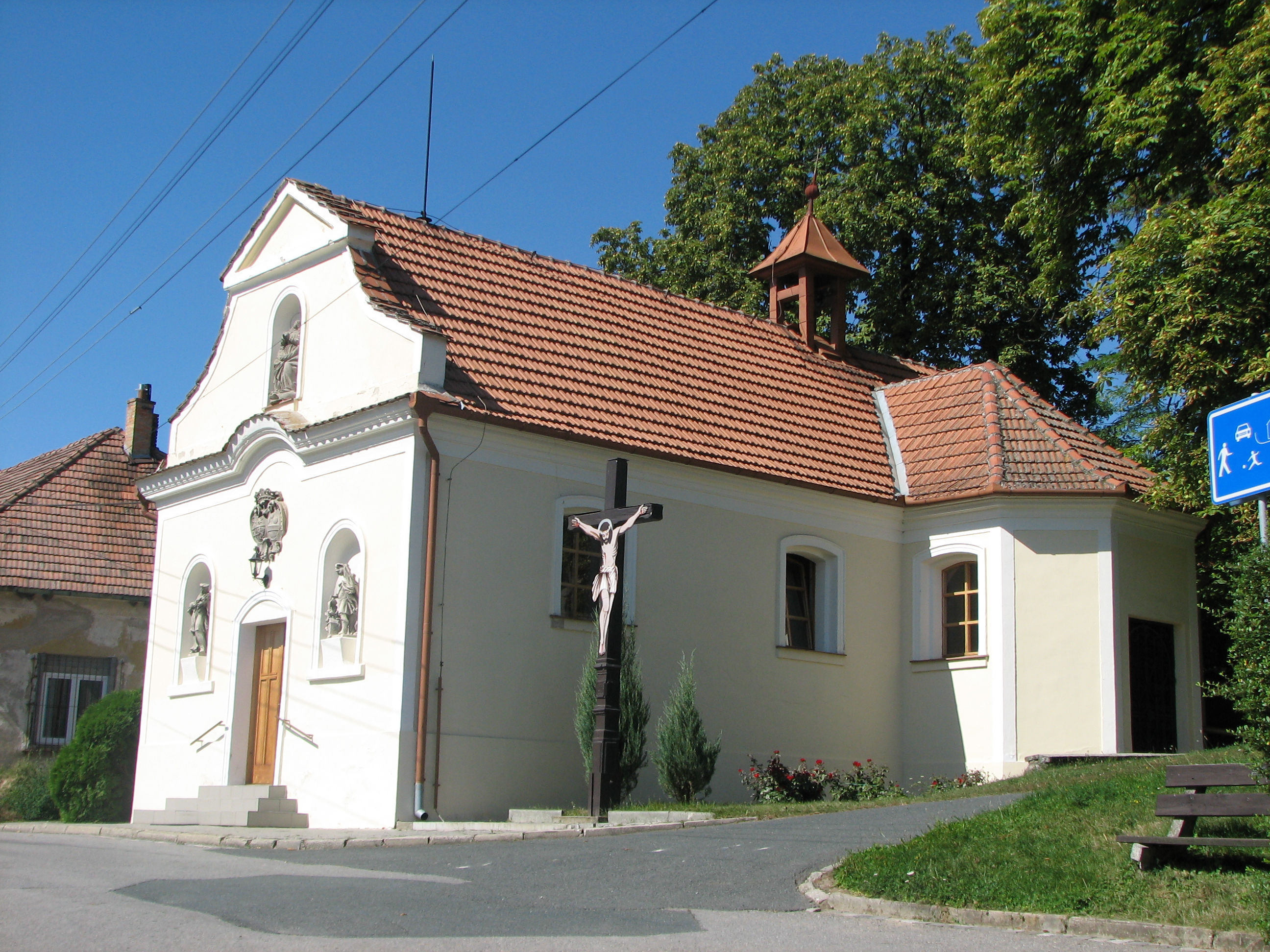
- Church of the Holy Trinity

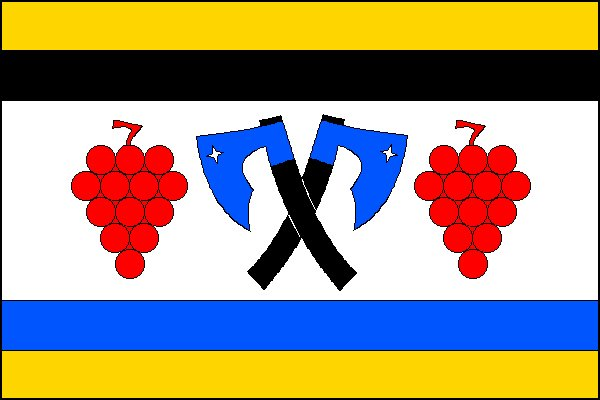
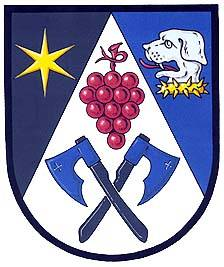
- Flag Coat of arms

- Location in the Czech Republic
- Coordinates: 49°0′33″N 17°2′51″E
- Country: Czech Republic
- Region: South Moravian
- District: Hodonín
- First mentioned: 1141

Area
  - Total: 6.03 km^{2} (2.33 sq mi)
- Elevation: 324 m (1,063 ft)

Population (2026-01-01)
  - Total: 593
  - Density: 98.3/km^{2} (255/sq mi)
- Time zone: UTC+1 (CET)
  - Summer (DST): UTC+2 (CEST)
- Postal code: 696 38
- Website: www.strazovice.cz

Strážovice (Czech pronunciation: [ˈstraːʒovɪtsɛ]) is a municipality and village in Hodonín District in the South Moravian Region of the Czech Republic. It has about 600 inhabitants.

== History ==
The first written mention of Strážovice is in a deed of Bishop Jindřich Zdík from 1141, in which it is mentioned as an estate of the Břeclav church.

== Demographics ==
Historical population
Year	Pop.	±%
1869	639	—
1880	647	+1.3%
1890	623	−3.7%
1900	669	+7.4%
1910	651	−2.7%
1921	742	+14.0%
1930	713	−3.9%
1950	624	−12.5%
1961	605	−3.0%
1970	554	−8.4%
1980	519	−6.3%
1991	545	+5.0%
2001	546	+0.2%
2011	585	+7.1%
2021	584	−0.2%
Source: Censuses

== Notable people ==
- Jano Köhler (1873–1941), painter; lived here and is buried here
