= Ondřej Voříšek =

Czech footballer

Personal information
- Date of birth: 5 January 1986
- Place of birth: Czechoslovakia
- Date of death: 13 August 2004 (aged 18)
- Place of death: Uherský Ostroh, Czech Republic
- Position: Forward

Senior career*
Years	Team	Apps	(Gls)
2002–2003	1. FC Slovácko	11	(0)

International career
2001–2002	Czech Republic U16	5	(3)
2002–2003	Czech Republic U17	18	(5)
2003–2004	Czech Republic U18	2	(1)
2003–2004	Czech Republic U19	6	(0)
- * Club domestic league appearances and goals

Ondřej Voříšek (5 January 1986 – 13 August 2004) was a Czech football player who played for 1. FC Slovácko. He represented his country at under-19 level.

Voříšek made his Gambrinus liga debut on 16 February 2003 in Slovácko's match against Jablonec, going on to make 11 appearances for Slovácko. His only start came against Blšany on 24 May 2003, whereas his other 10 appearances were as a substitute.

Voříšek died in a car accident in the town of Uherský Ostroh in August 2004 at the age of 18.
