= Joel Müller =

German rabbi (1827–1895)

Rabbi Joel Müller
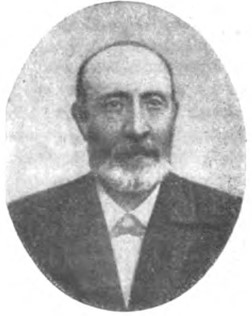
- Müller in 1907.
- Title: Rabbi

Personal life
- Born: 1827 Uherský Ostroh, Moravia
- Died: November 6, 1895 (aged 67–68) Berlin, Germany
- Known for: Scholarship on responsa literature and editions of Talmudic and halakhic texts
- Occupation: Rabbi, Talmudist

Religious life
- Religion: Judaism

Joel Müller (1827 – November 6, 1895) was a German rabbi and Talmudist, born in Ungarisch-Ostra, Moravia, and died in Berlin.

He received a thorough Talmudic training and succeeded his father as rabbi of his native town. His next rabbinate was that of Leipa, Bohemia; some of the sermons which he preached there have been published — "Die Spenden der Mutterfreude" (1868) and a collection of sermons on "Bibelbilder" (1869). Later he preached in Berlin.

From Leipa Müller went to Vienna, and became a teacher of religion in a "Realschule." This he resigned to become professor of Talmud at the Berlin Lehranstalt für die Wissenschaft des Judenthums.

In 1878 Müller published in Vienna an edition of the "Masseket Soferim," and in the same year "Ḥilluf Minhagim"; the latter, which is a work of great value, first appeared in the Hebrew periodical "Ha-Shaḥar." Müller's treatment of the early responsa literature was especially excellent. His "Teshubot Ḥakme Ẓarefat we-Lotir" appeared in Vienna in 1881; in 1886, "Briefe und Responsen aus der Vorgaonäischen Jüdischen Literatur"; in 1888, "Teshubot Geone Mizraḥ u-Ma'arab"; and in 1893, "Die Responsen des R. Meschullam, Sohn des R. Kalonymus." Müller's chief contribution to the responsa literature is his "Mafteaḥ" to the responsa of the Geonim — a summary of the contents of the various publications comprising the answers of the Geonim to questions submitted to them (Berlin, 1891). One of his latest works was an edition of the "Halakot Pesuḳot." After his death his edition of Saadia's halakic writings appeared as vol. ix of the "Œuvres Complètes de R. Saadia ben Iosef al-Fayyoûmî."

Müller's "Jüdische Hochschulen" (1885) and "Jüdische Moral im Nachtalmudischen Zeitalter" contain some of his sermons.
