= Jaroslav Kozlík =

Czech educator, volleyball player and theorist of education

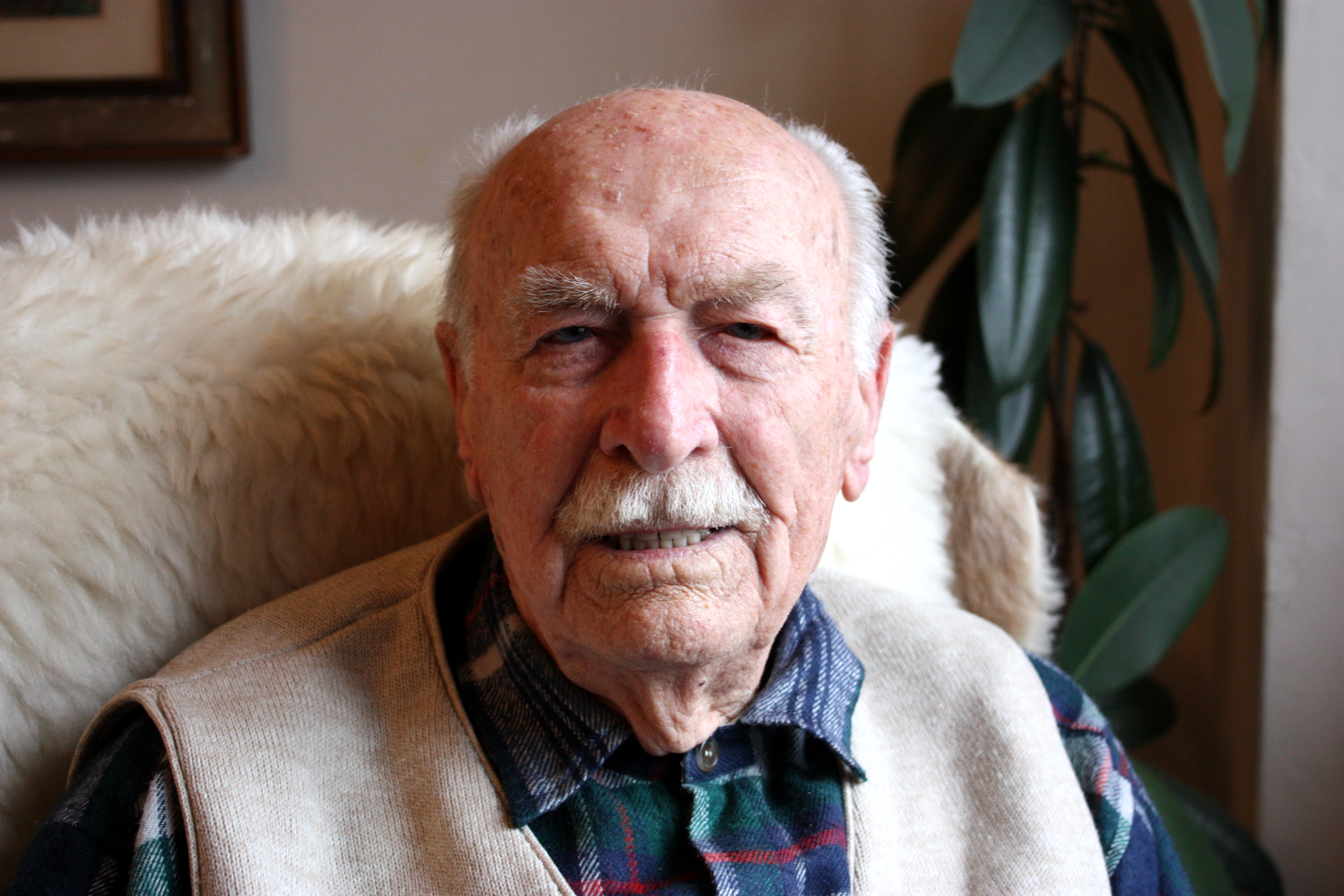
- Jaroslav Kozlík in February 2012
- Born: 22 May 1907; Bystřice pod Hostýnem, Austria-Hungary
- Died: 21 October 2012 (aged 105)
- Occupation: Educator

Jaroslav Kozlík (22 May 1907 – 21 October 2012) was a Czech educator and theorist of education, a senior member of the Sokol movement, and a volleyball player. He was a pioneer of volleyball and a former volleyball champion of Czechoslovakia. He was the author of 30 books and over 300 articles, mostly devoted to the theory of education and sports organizations. Kozlík developed the concept of physical education for primary schools in the Czech Republic and Slovakia. Until his death, Kozlík was active in the Sokol organization, criticizing its current administration for a lack of edificatory impingement on society and youth.

== Career as a volleyball player ==
Kozlík was a member of winning teams at Czechoslovak volleyball championships in 1929, 1936, and 1939 and won championships of the Sokol organization as a captain of the Sokol Kroměříž team ten times between 1926 and 1936.

== Career as a pedagogue and researcher ==
Kozlík started his career as a teacher at Karolína Světlá's School for Girls in Kroměříž in 1926. From 1933 to 1945 he taught at the Experimental Primary School in Zlín. The aim of the experimental primary schools (of which there were three in the Czechoslovakia) was to develop and apply progressive teaching methods including project teaching. After World War II, Kozlík moved to Prague and accepted position in the Research Institute of Education, where he stayed until 1972, when he was forced to retire because of his openly expressed disagreement with the Warsaw Pact invasion of Czechoslovakia in 1968. Kozlík had an influence on the concept of physical education at primary schools in the Czech Republic and Slovakia, establishing obligatory swimming and skiing training. He participated in several school reforms between 1945 and 1972 and on the education reform in Czechoslovakia after the Velvet revolution in 1989.

== Personal life ==
Kozlík was born in Bystřice pod Hostýnem. He was married Anna Chalupová, who also engaged in sports. The couple had three daughters (Iva, Jarmila and Alena) and remained together until Chalupová's death in 1998. While working at the Experimental Primary School in Zlín, Jaroslav Kozlík has established a close relationship with Jan Antonín Baťa, then the patriarch of the prominent Czechoslovak entrepreneur family. Kozlík first visited Baťa in 1933 in the Baťa company headquarters to discuss Baťa sponsoring a new gymnasium hall. Baťa and Kozlík held different opinions on the concept of the building. Kozlík, who regarded Baťa's concept unfit to the use as a school gymnasium, told Baťa that "someone understands the spindle industry, someone understands the shoe industry and I have a little understanding of physical education". Upon this, Baťa signed Kozlík's proposal without further debate. Kozlík's diligence and courage made a deep impression on Baťa, who later asked Kozlík to become his personal trainer.

In 2009, he was named an honorary citizen of Prague 4.

He died of natural causes on 21 October 2012, at the age of 105.
