= Oslnovice =

- Municipality
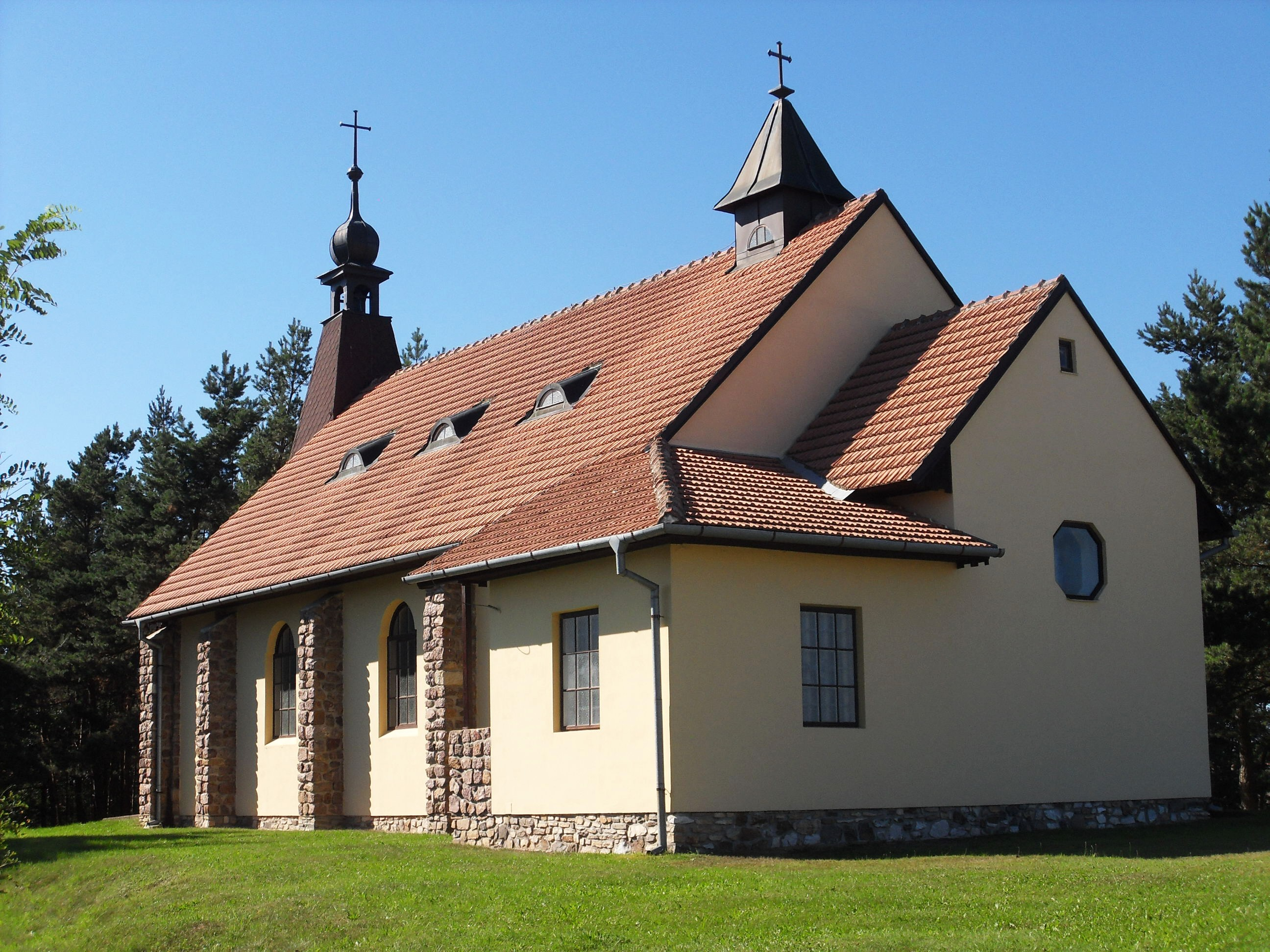
- Chapel of the Sacred Heart

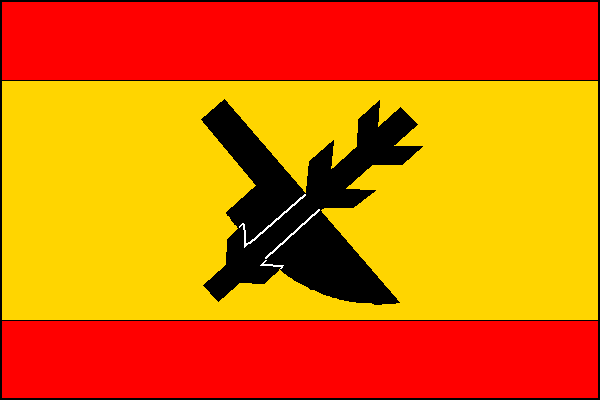
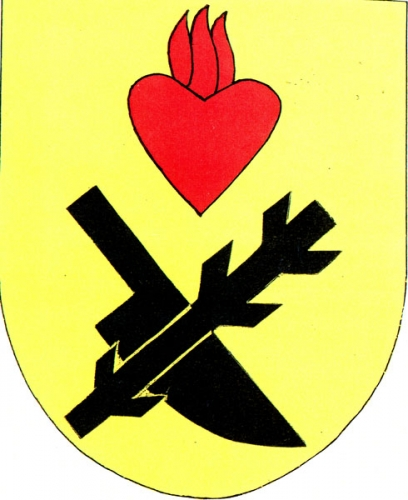
- Flag Coat of arms

- Location in the Czech Republic
- Coordinates: 48°55′56″N 15°41′15″E
- Country: Czech Republic
- Region: South Moravian
- District: Znojmo
- First mentioned: 1228

Area
  - Total: 6.10 km^{2} (2.36 sq mi)
- Elevation: 442 m (1,450 ft)

Population (2026-01-01)
  - Total: 67
  - Density: 11/km^{2} (28/sq mi)
- Time zone: UTC+1 (CET)
  - Summer (DST): UTC+2 (CEST)
- Postal code: 671 07
- Website: www.obecoslnovice.cz

Oslnovice is a municipality and village in Znojmo District in the South Moravian Region of the Czech Republic. It has about 70 inhabitants.

== Geography ==
Oslnovice is located about 27 kilometres (17 mi) west of Znojmo and 72 km (45 mi) southwest of Brno, 6 km (4 mi) of the Czech–Austrian border. It lies in the Jevišovice Uplands. The southern and eastern municipal border is formed by the Thaya River and by the upper Vranov Reservoir, built on this river.

== History ==
The first written mention of Oslnovice is in a deed of King Ottokar I from 1228.

After the Thirty Years' War, many Germans immigrated to Oslnovice and the village became ethnically mixed. At the end of the 19th century, most of Germans moved away and the village became again completely Czech.

== Demographics ==
Historical population

Year	Pop.	±%
1869	145	—
1880	147	+1.4%
1890	139	−5.4%
1900	139	+0.0%
1910	157	+12.9%

Year	Pop.	±%
1921	172	+9.6%
1930	167	−2.9%
1950	132	−21.0%
1961	140	+6.1%
1970	128	−8.6%

Year	Pop.	±%
1980	117	−8.6%
1991	111	−5.1%
2001	107	−3.6%
2011	86	−19.6%
2021	69	−19.8%

Source: Censuses

== Economy ==
Oslnovice is mainly an agricultural village.

== Transport ==
There are no railways or major roads passing through the municipality.

== Sights ==
The main landmark is the Chapel of the Sacred Heart. It is an Art Nouveau chapel decorated by Jano Köhler, which was moved to Oslnovice from Brno-Královo Pole in 1969. There is also the Chapel of the Virgin Mary from around 1820.
