= Martin Lecián =

Czech serial killer who was executed for several murders and attempted murders

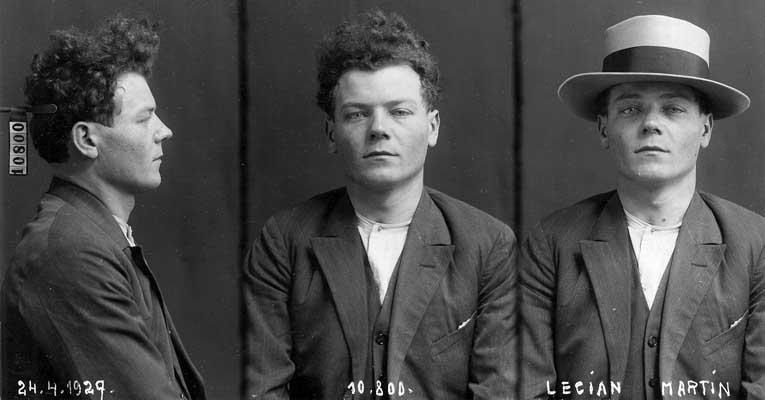
- Born: 31 October 1900; Uherský Ostroh, Austria-Hungary
- Died: 6 October 1927 (aged 26); Olomouc, Czechoslovakia
- Cause of death: Execution by hanging
- Other names: Terror of Moravia; Moravian horror
- Conviction: Murder
- Penalty: Death

Details
- Victims: 4
- Span of crimes: 19 January – 25 September 1927
- Country: Czechoslovakia
- Date apprehended: 23 April 1927

Martin Lecián (31 October 1900 – 6 October 1927) was a Czech serial killer who murdered 3 policemen and a prison officer and attempted to kill 7 other policemen. He was executed on 6 October 1927. His case was very famous, with several articles appearing in newspapers that glorified his actions.

== Biography ==
Lecián was born on 31 October 1900 in Uherský Ostroh in Moravia, Austria-Hungary, and was brought up in a youth detention centre. Immediately after his release, he began to commit crimes and was twice punished by the Regional Court of Uherské Hradiště. During his military service, he fled five times. After his last desertion, he met Maria Krenovska and together they started stealing treasures all over Moravia. They opened the door by pulling out the 4 to 5 mm thick coffin cloak to destroy the locking mechanism, and then opened the cash register without having to inhale any ashes. He used this method as he was suffering from tuberculosis.

In Prostějov, however, both Lecián and Krenovska were detained and transferred to a hospital in Olomouc. From there on 10 December 1926 Martin escaped with a dangerous criminal named Szekely, injuring two guards on the way. They then committed a series of thefts, but on 21 December they split up in Bučovice, with Lecián staying in Moravia while Szekely left for Slovakia. Both of them were announced as sought-after criminals by the District Chief of Staff in Vyškov.

On 19 January 1927, Lecián committed his first murder in Slavkov u Brna, killing municipal police officer Rudolf Hanák with four shots from his weapon, as the officer had attempted to interrupt his burglary. The next day he attempted to kill the shop owner and a police officer in Poledňák. A month later he murdered guard František Marčík at the Grafony in Jihlava. In mid-February, Lecián was identified by a Jihlava gendarme on a train. Lecián shot him several times and eventually jumped out of the moving train. A search was announced for him with a reward of 10,000 korunas for his capture. Despite this, Lecián began to wear a mask and continued his criminal activities. The public celebrated his courage, and songs were written about him, presenting him as a gallant cassarer who robbed the rich.

His popularity ended on 8 March, when he shot twice in Veselí nad Moravou at Chancellor Antonín Stuchlı, who was expecting a child shortly after his wedding. Lecián then shot down military chief Chvalovsky shortly afterwards. Subsequently, armed soldiers and gendarme engaged the murderer in several shootings. At one of them, near Polešovice, Lecián was injured, but still managed to escape the police. Only on 23 April was he detained in Nový Bohumín by civil police officers Halíř and Kaluža. A four-month investigation followed, followed up by a six-day trial. On 31 September 1927, Lecián was sentenced to death for his crimes. However, on 25 September, along with the deserter Kašparik, he tried to escape. They were forced to seize the weapon and kill the guard Ferenc Kisse but were eventually recaptured after a brief shootout. As a result, he was denied a pardon from the President of the Republic. Martin Lecián was executed at the courtyard of the Olomouc military prison on 6 October 1927 at 6:00.

== Successors ==
Six years after Lecián's execution, František Ondráš tried to outdo him. He described himself as his "heir", and he claimed that he would be worse than Lecián was in his life. Ondráš managed to kill two gendarmes, but he himself was killed out of fear by two companions, the Gerspitzer brothers. Both were, however, sentenced to death.

After several years, the other person who tried to imitate Lecián was Jozef Prekop, a cousin of his, from Červený Kameň near Púchov. However, he was soon injured in a shootout and arrested in the Vinohrady hospital, where he asked for medical treatment for his wound.

== See also ==
- List of serial killers by country

== Literature ==
- JEDLIČKA, Miloslav. The most famous mordes of the First Republic. Prague 2011.
- KELENBERGER, Jiří. Martine, you grow up for the gallows. Prague 1992.
- PLACHÝ, Jiří; PEJČOCH, Ivo. Masaryk's feet. Cheb 2012, pp. 65–84.
- URBÁŠEK, Pavel. Martin Lecián - postrach of Moravia. The truth about a robbery legend. Moravian Voluntary Journal 1996, No. 1, pp. 25–35, No. 2, pp. 129–135, pp. 3 pp. 274–282, pp. 4 pp. 382–393.
- URBÁŠEK, Pavel. Prerov's episode of the famous robber and murderer of Martina Leciana. Sborník SOA Přerov, 5, 1997, s. 43–61.
- URBÁŠEK, Pavel. Criminal. An example of Martin Lecian. In: People in Moravia in the first half of the 20th century. Brno 2006, p. 319-329.
