= Nenkovice =

- Municipality
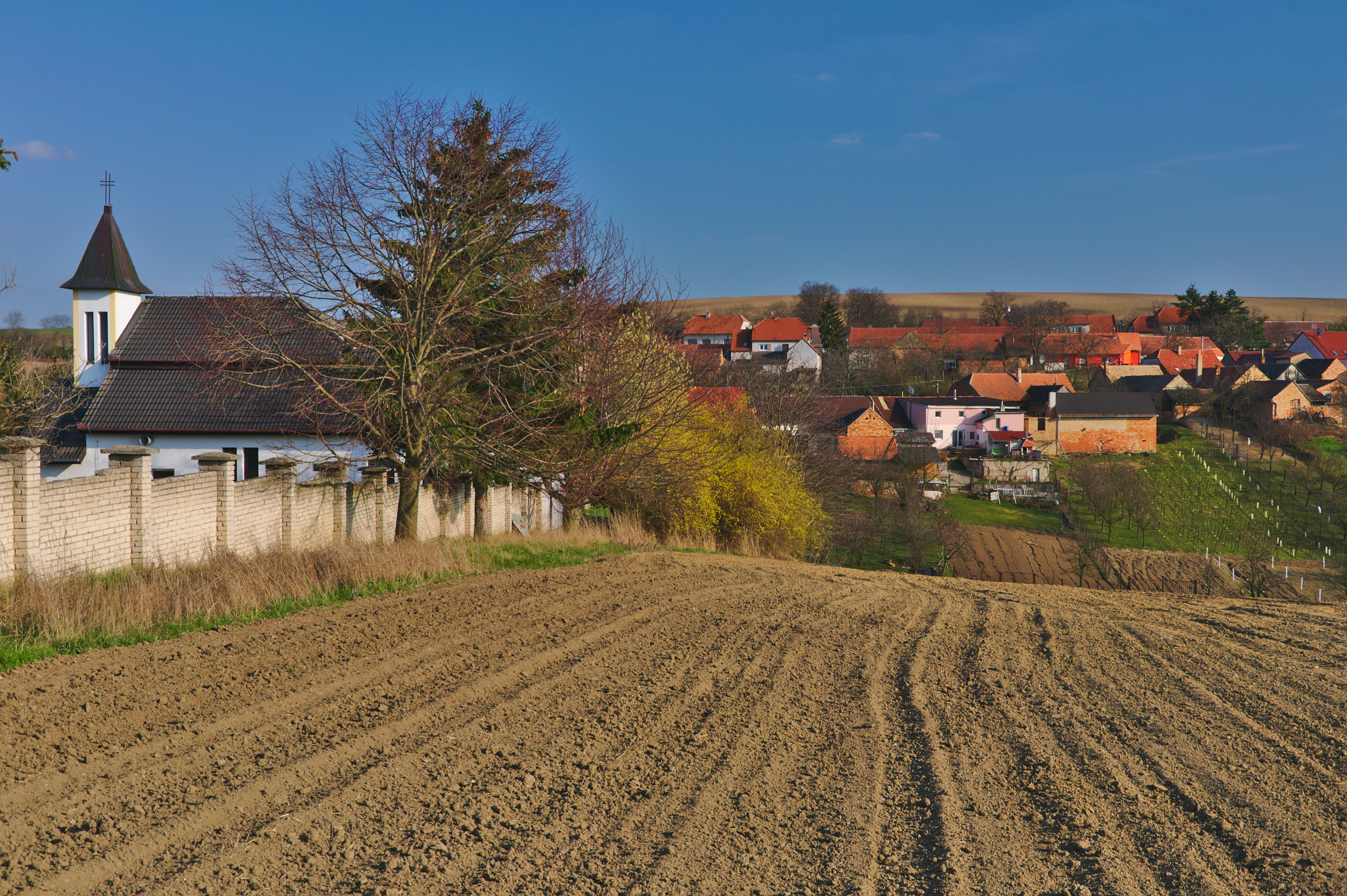
- General view

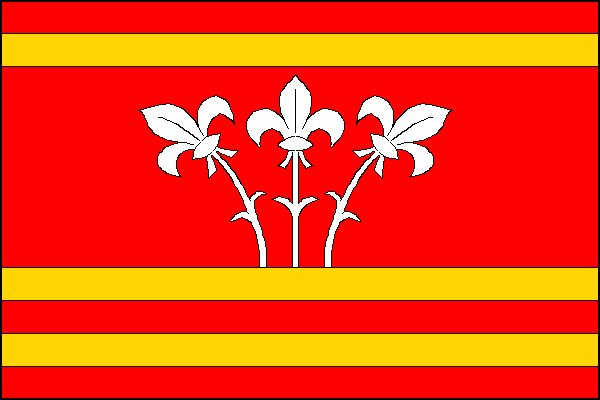
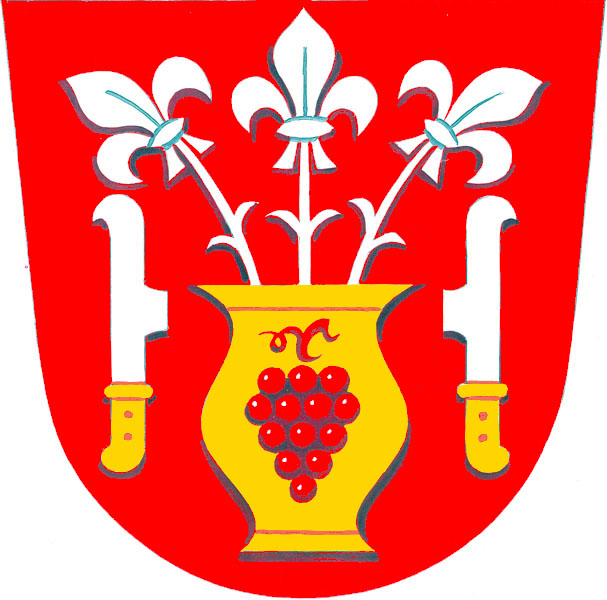
- Flag Coat of arms

- Location in the Czech Republic
- Coordinates: 49°0′11″N 17°0′39″E
- Country: Czech Republic
- Region: South Moravian
- District: Hodonín
- First mentioned: 1341

Area
  - Total: 6.54 km^{2} (2.53 sq mi)
- Elevation: 260 m (850 ft)

Population (2026-01-01)
  - Total: 469
  - Density: 71.7/km^{2} (186/sq mi)
- Time zone: UTC+1 (CET)
  - Summer (DST): UTC+2 (CEST)
- Postal code: 696 37
- Website: www.nenkovice.cz

Nenkovice is a municipality and village in Hodonín District in the South Moravian Region of the Czech Republic. It has about 500 inhabitants.

Nenkovice lies approximately 19 kilometres (12 mi) north-west of Hodonín, 37 km (23 mi) south-east of Brno, and 223 km (139 mi) south-east of Prague.

== Demographics ==
Historical population
Year	Pop.	±%
1869	684	—
1880	694	+1.5%
1890	679	−2.2%
1900	784	+15.5%
1910	871	+11.1%
1921	843	−3.2%
1930	798	−5.3%
1950	719	−9.9%
1961	712	−1.0%
1970	603	−15.3%
1980	537	−10.9%
1991	447	−16.8%
2001	448	+0.2%
2011	446	−0.4%
2021	471	+5.6%
Source: Censuses

== Notable people ==
- Jano Köhler (1873–1941), painter; lived here
- Blažena Holišová (1930–2011), actress
