= Karl Uhlirz =

Austrian historian and archivist (1854–1914)

- Born: 13 June 1854; Vienna, Austria
- Died: 22 March 1914 (aged 59); Graz, Styria, Austria
- Education: University of Vienna
- Occupations: Historian; archivist

Karl Uhlirz (13 June 1854, in Vienna – 22 March 1914, in Graz) was an Austrian historian and archivist.

He studied history at the University of Vienna, and from 1877 worked as an employee of the Monumenta Germaniae Historica (diplomatics edition) under Theodor von Sickel. From 1882 he served as a caretaker at the Vienna city archives, where in 1889 he became its director. In 1888 he obtained his habilitation for history of the Middle Ages and historical auxiliary sciences. In 1903 he succeeded Franz Krones as professor of Austrian history at the University of Graz.

== Selected works ==
- Die Urkundenfälschung zu Passau im zehnten Jahrhundert, 1882 – The forgeries of Passau in the 10th century.
- Geschichte des Erzbistums Magdeburg, 1887 – History of the Archdiocese of Magdeburg.
- Das Archiv der l.f. Stadt Zwettl in Niederösterreich (as editor, 1895) – The archive of Zwettl in Lower Austria.
- Die rechnungen des kirchmeisteramtes von St. Stephan zu Wien, 1901 – Account of the magisterium of St. Stephen in Vienna.
- Jahrbücher des deutschen Reiches unter Otto II. und Otto III, 1902 – Yearbooks of the German Empire under Otto II and Otto III.
- Österreichische geschichte (with Franz Krones; 2 volumes, 1906) – Austrian history.

He was the author of twenty biographies in the Allgemeine Deutsche Biographie.
