= Chvalčov =

- Municipality
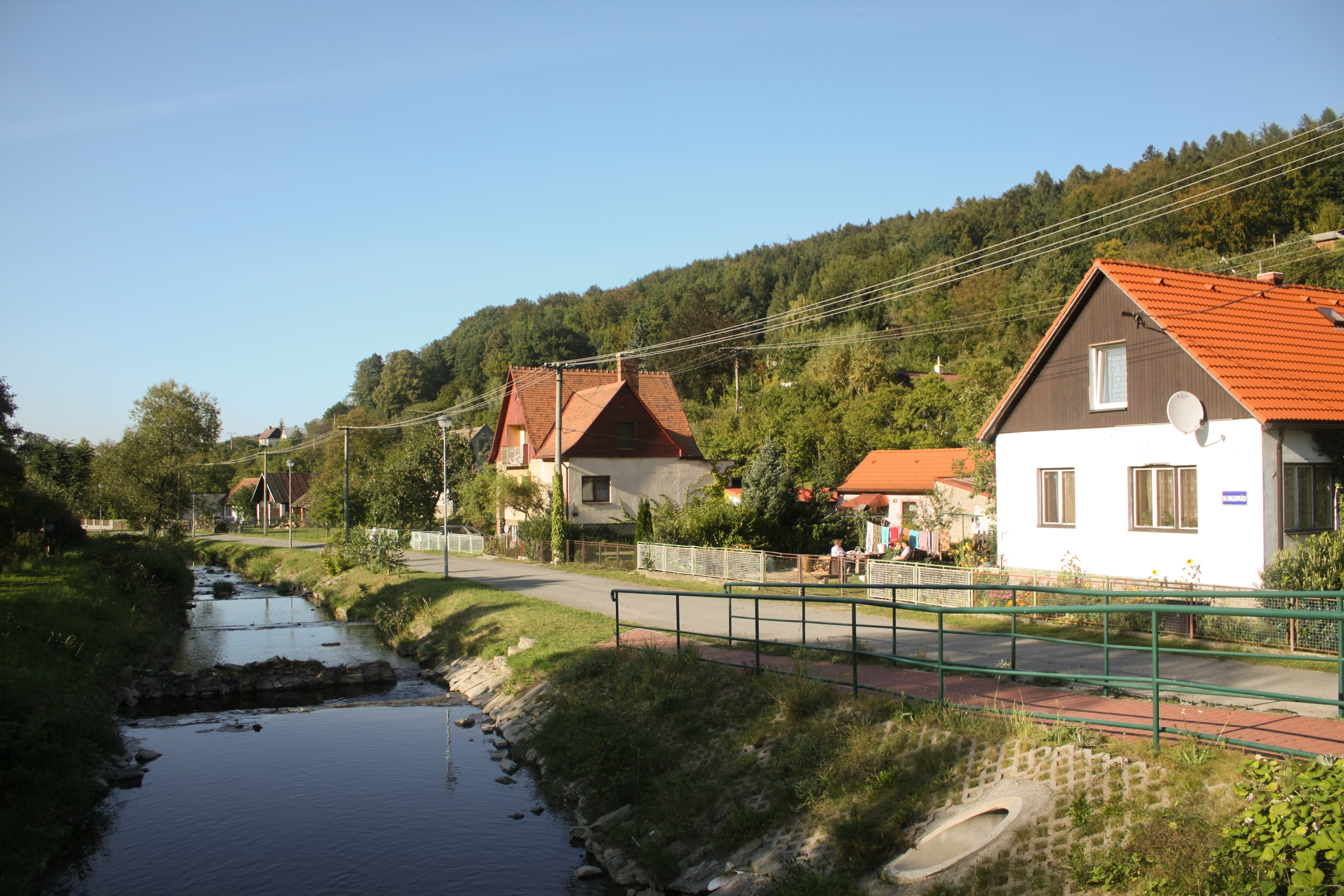
- Bystřička River in Chvalčov

- Flag Coat of arms

- Location in the Czech Republic
- Coordinates: 49°23′31″N 17°42′41″E
- Country: Czech Republic
- Region: Zlín
- District: Kroměříž
- First mentioned: 1369

Area
  - Total: 22.93 km^{2} (8.85 sq mi)
- Elevation: 386 m (1,266 ft)

Population (2026-01-01)
  - Total: 1,597
  - Density: 69.65/km^{2} (180.4/sq mi)
- Time zone: UTC+1 (CET)
  - Summer (DST): UTC+2 (CEST)
- Postal code: 768 72
- Website: www.obec-chvalcov.cz

Chvalčov is a municipality and village in Kroměříž District in the Zlín Region of the Czech Republic. It has about 1,600 inhabitants.

Chvalčov lies approximately 25 kilometres (16 mi) north-east of Kroměříž, 18 km (11 mi) north of Zlín, and 249 km (155 mi) east of Prague.

== History ==
The first written mention of Chvalčov is from 1369.

== Demographics ==
Historical population
Year	Pop.	±%
1869	891	—
1880	1,066	+19.6%
1890	1,198	+12.4%
1900	1,308	+9.2%
1910	1,499	+14.6%
1921	1,382	−7.8%
1930	1,412	+2.2%
1950	1,638	+16.0%
1961	1,592	−2.8%
1970	1,635	+2.7%
1980	1,775	+8.6%
1991	1,713	−3.5%
2001	1,644	−4.0%
2011	1,637	−0.4%
2021	1,539	−6.0%
Source: Censuses

== Sights ==
The Hostýn Hill, a Catholic pilgrimage site, lies in the municipal territory of Chvalčov. There is also the ruin of Obřany Castle on the eponymous hill.
