= Franz Krones =

Austrian historian

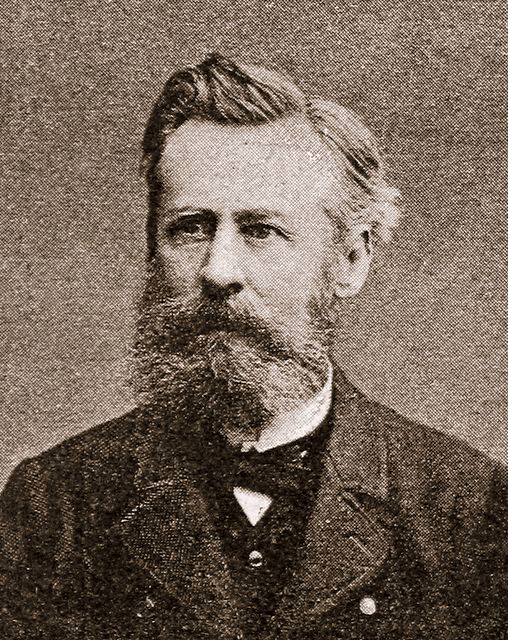
Franz Krones

Franz Krones Ritter von Marchland (19 November 1835, in Ungarisch-Ostrau – 17 October 1902, in Graz) was an Austrian historian.

He studied history at the University of Vienna, where from 1854 he attended classes at the Institut für Österreichische Geschichtsforschung (Institute for Austrian Historical Research). After graduation, he taught classes at the Rechtsakademie in Kaschau and at the gymnasium in Graz. In 1864 he became an associate professor, and during the following year, was named a full professor of Austrian history at the University of Graz. On two separate occasions he was dean at the university (1868/69 and 1872/73) and in 1876/77 he served as rector.

== Selected works ==
- Ungarn unter Maria Theresia und Joseph II. 1740–1790 (1871) – Hungary under Maria Theresa and Joseph II, 1740–1790.
- Handbuch der Geschichte Österreichs von der ältesten bis zur neuesten Zeit (5 volumes, 1876–79) – Handbook of Austrian history from the oldest to most recent time.
- Zur Geschichte des deutschen Volksthums im Karpatenlande, 1878 – On the history of German people in the Carpathian Mountains.
- Grundriß der Oesterreichischen Geschichte mit besonderer Rücksicht auf Quellen- und Literaturkunde, 1882 – Outline of Austrian history with special reference to sources and literature.
- Geschichte der Karl Franzens-Universität in Graz, 1886 – History of Karl Franzens University in Graz.
- Die deutsche Besiedlung der östlichen Alpenlan̈der insbesondere Steiermarks, Kärntens und Krains, nach ihrin geschichtlichen und örtlichen Verhältnissen, 1889 – The German colonization of the eastern Alps especially Styria, Carinthia nad Carniola etc.
- Feldmarschall Radetzky. Ein Lebensbild, 1891 – Joseph Radetzky von Radetz, a biography.
- Verfassung und Verwaltung der Mark und des Herzogthums Steier von ihren Anfängen bis zur Herrschaft der Habsburger, 1897 – Constitution and administration of the Mark and the Duchy of Styria from its beginnings to the rule of the Habsburgs.
- Landesfürst, Behörden und Stände des Herzogthums Steier. 1283–1411 (1900) – Local rulers, authorities and estates of the Duchy of Styria, 1283–1411.
- Oesterreichische geschichte (with Karl Uhlirz; 2 volumes, 1906) – Austrian history.

He was the author of 172 biographies in the Allgemeine Deutsche Biographie.
