= Uherský Ostroh =

- Town
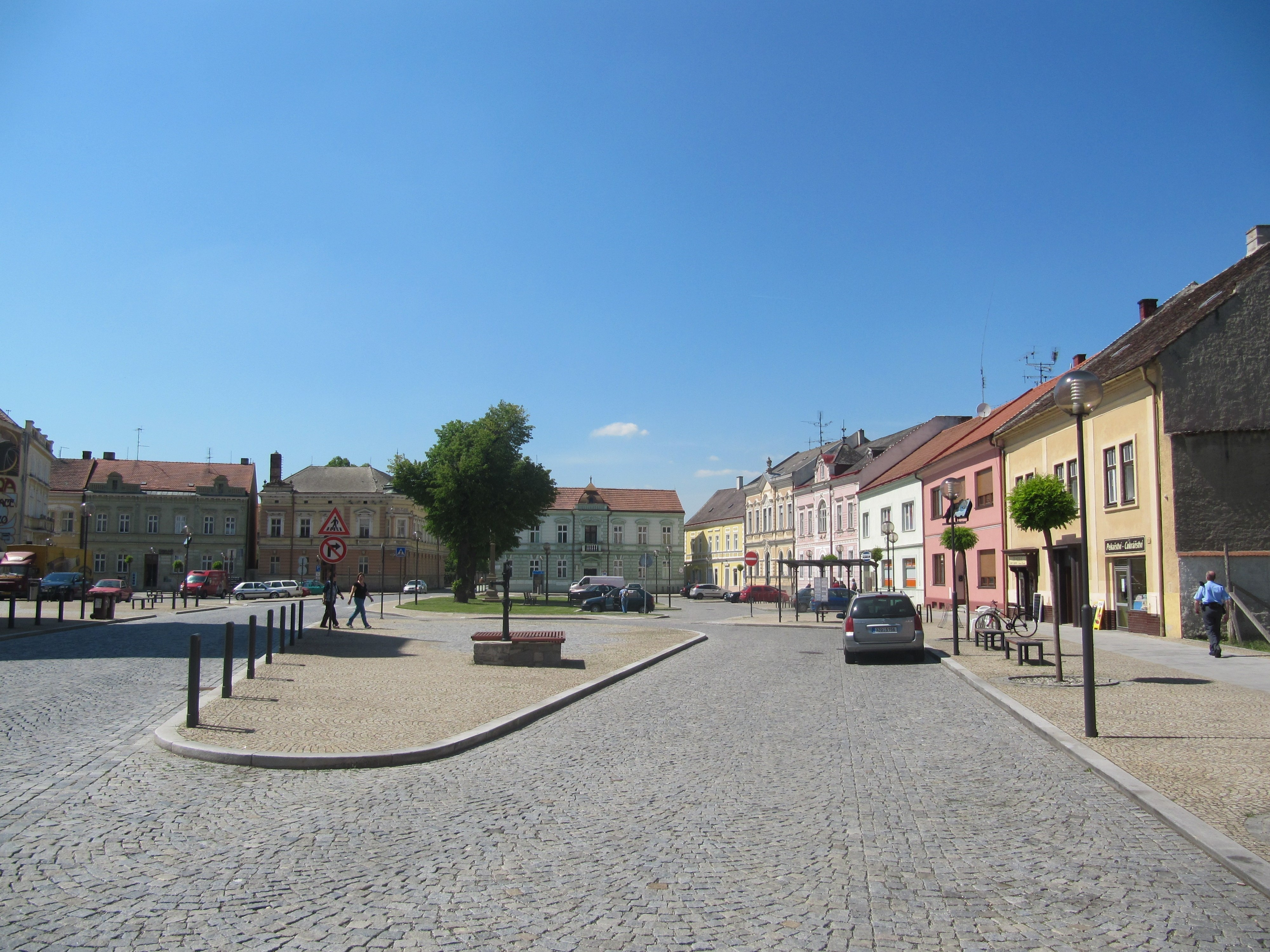
- Town square

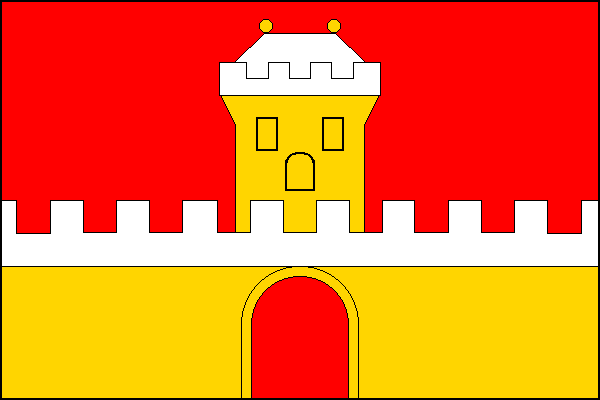
- Flag Coat of arms

- Location in the Czech Republic
- Coordinates: 48°59′8″N 17°23′23″E
- Country: Czech Republic
- Region: Zlín
- District: Uherské Hradiště
- First mentioned: 1286

Government
  - Mayor: Vlastimil Kuřimský

Area
  - Total: 26.53 km^{2} (10.24 sq mi)
- Elevation: 178 m (584 ft)

Population (2026-01-01)
  - Total: 4,168
  - Density: 157.1/km^{2} (406.9/sq mi)
- Time zone: UTC+1 (CET)
  - Summer (DST): UTC+2 (CEST)
- Postal code: 687 24
- Website: www.uhostroh.cz

Uherský Ostroh (Czech pronunciation: [ˈuɦɛrskiː ˈostrox]; German: Ungarisch Ostra) is a town in Uherské Hradiště District in the Zlín Region of the Czech Republic. It has about 4,200 inhabitants. The town is located on the Morava River, on the border between the Lower Morava Valley and Vizovice Highlands.

The historic town centre is well preserved and is protected as an urban monument zone. The main landmark of the town is the Uherský Ostroh Castle.

== Administrative division ==
Uherský Ostroh consists of three municipal parts (in brackets population according to the 2021 census):

- Uherský Ostroh (1,106)
- Kvačice (517)
- Ostrožské Předměstí (2,474)

== Etymology ==
The name literally means 'Hungarian promontory' in Czech. It refers to its historic location on a promontory near the border with the Kingdom of Hungary.

== Geography ==
Uherský Ostroh is located about 10 kilometres (6 mi) southwest of Uherské Hradiště and 33 km (21 mi) southwest of Zlín. The western part of the municipal territory lies in the Lower Morava Valley and the eastern part lies in the Vizovice Highlands. The town is situated on the Morava River, at its confluence with the Okluky Stream.

== History ==
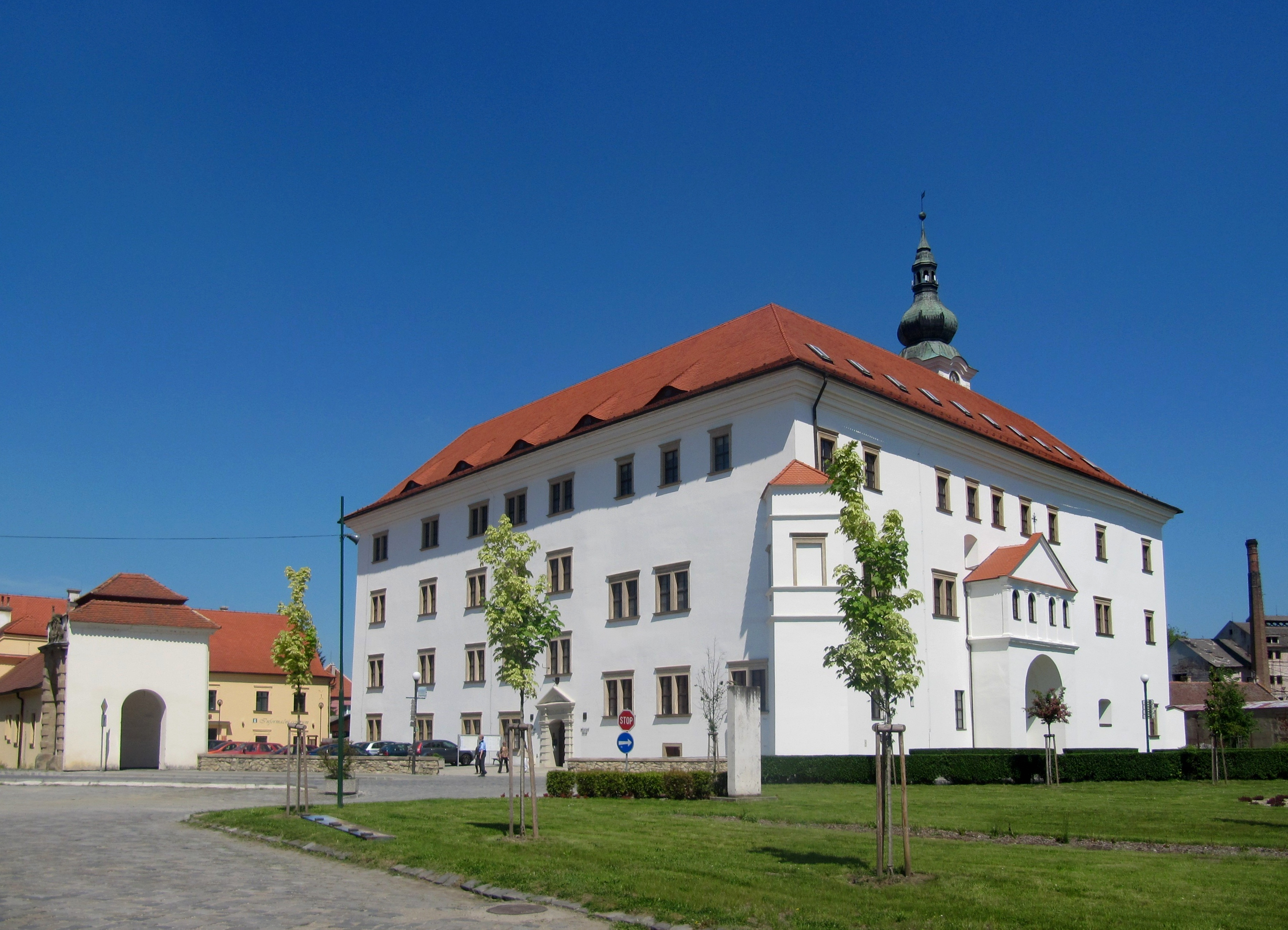
Uherský Ostroh Castle

A predecessor of the town was a settlement called Stenice, located on an island of the river Morava. The settlement existed here in the second half of the 11th century. In the mid-13th century, a defense system was built against invasions from Hungary. It included a water fortress near a ford across the Morava, founded here by Ottokar II of Bohemia. The first written mention of the Ostroh Castle is from 1275.

During the Hussite Wars, Uherský Ostroh was a military camp of the Hussites. In 1511, Uherský Ostroh was acquired by the lords of Kunovice. During their rule, the water fortress was rebuilt into a Renaissance residence. After the Battle of White Mountain in 1620, the properties of lords of Kunovice were confiscated from them, and Uherský Ostroh was acquired by the Liechtenstein family, who owned it for almost 300 years.

The Liechtenstein family did not reside here and the estate economically stagnated. Uherský Ostroh suffered from frequent floods and raids by Turks and Hungarians, however it remained a small agricultural and craft town.

== Demographics ==
Historical population

Year	Pop.	±%
1869	3,409	—
1880	3,683	+8.0%
1890	3,945	+7.1%
1900	4,429	+12.3%
1910	4,737	+7.0%

Year	Pop.	±%
1921	4,739	+0.0%
1930	4,338	−8.5%
1950	4,394	+1.3%
1961	4,614	+5.0%
1970	4,705	+2.0%

Year	Pop.	±%
1980	4,717	+0.3%
1991	4,451	−5.6%
2001	4,519	+1.5%
2011	4,334	−4.1%
2021	4,097	−5.5%

Source: Censuses

== Transport ==
The I/55 road (the section from Uherské Hradiště to Hodonín) runs through the town. The I/71 road splits from it and connects Uherský Ostroh with the Czech–Slovak border in Velká nad Veličkou.

Uherský Ostroh is located on the railway line Brno–Uherské Hradiště.

== Culture ==
Uherský Ostroh lies in the cultural region of Moravian Slovakia. Annual cultural events in the town include ceremonial opening of the tourist season, theatrical mini-festival, European Heritage Days celebrations, and hody.

== Sights ==
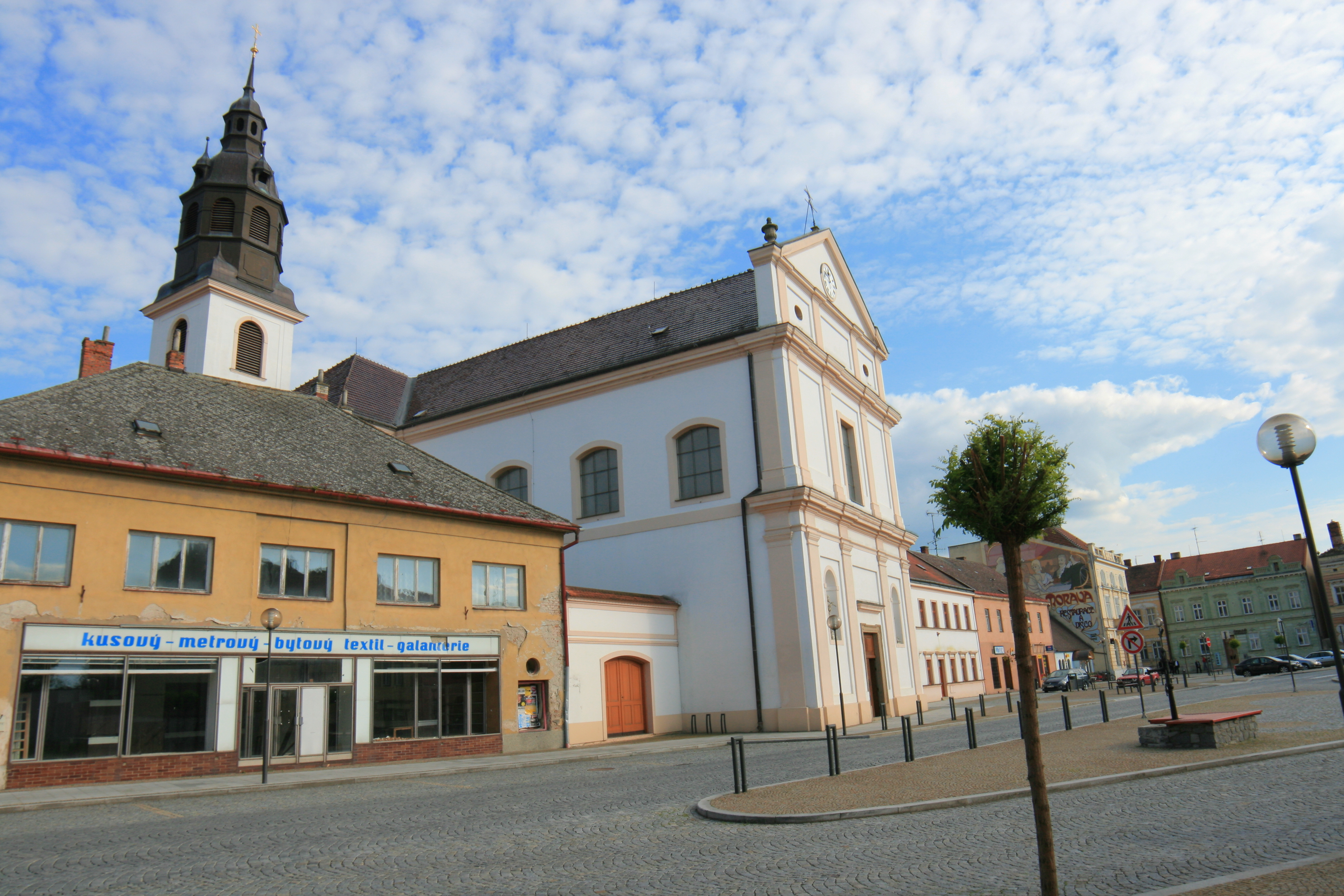
Church of Saint Andrew

The most important monument is the Uherský Ostroh Castle. It was rebuilt to its present appearance in 1560–1570 and the castle park was added. Today it serves as the town hall, a library, and a tourist information centre. The castle tower, the castle gallery and underground spaces with interactive exhibits are open to the public.

The main landmark of the town square is the Church of Saint Andrew. The church was built in the Baroque and Neoclassical styles in 1751–1758. The town square is lined by preserved burgher houses.

In Ostrožské Předměstí is a prismatic bell tower from the 1870s, with decorative sgraffiti by Jano Köhler from 1912.

== Notable people ==
- Joel Müller (1827–1895), rabbi
- Franz Krones (1835–1902), Austrian historian
- Israel Taglicht (1862−1943), rabbi
- Jan Černý (1874–1959), politician, prime minister of Czechoslovakia
- Otakar Borůvka (1899–1995), mathematician
- Martin Lecián (1900–1927), serial killer
- František Vaněk (1931–2020), ice hockey player

== Twin towns – sister cities ==
Uherský Ostroh is twinned with:

- Trenčianska Teplá, Slovakia
