= Hostýn =

Hill in the Czech Republic

Coordinates: 49°23′N 17°42′E

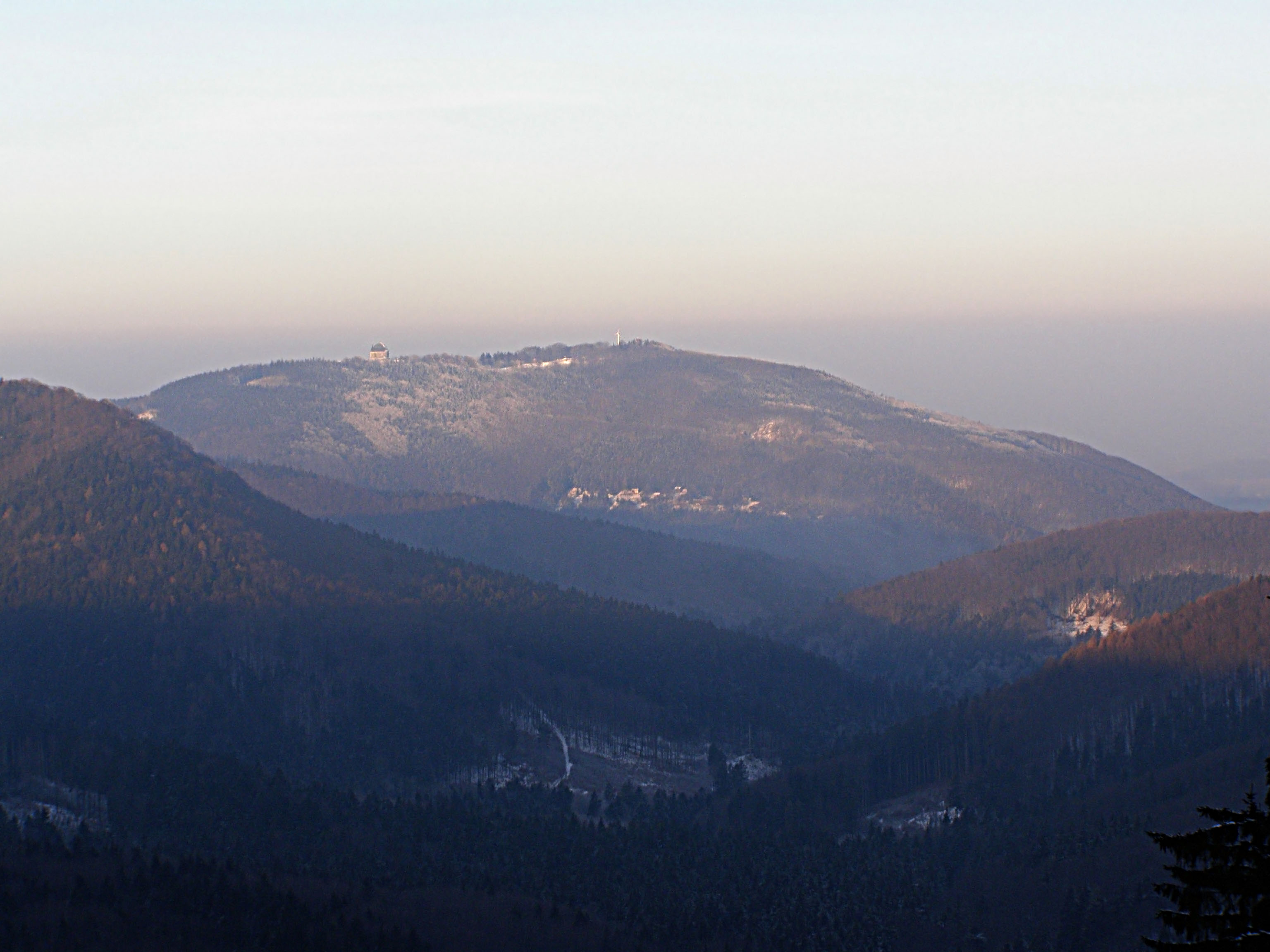
Eastern slope of Hostýn

Hostýn (or Svatý Hostýn, i.e. Saint Hostýn) is a hill in the territory of Chvalčov in the Zlín Region of the Czech Republic. It is part of the Hostýn-Vsetín Mountains and has an elevation of 735 metres (2,411 ft). It is an important Marian place of pilgrimage. The pilgrimage comes from a legend that describes a miracle made by the Virgin Mary.

== Legend ==
According to a traditional legend, first recorded in 1665 by the writer Bohuslav Balbín in his work Diva Montis Sancti, during the disastrous raid of the "Tartars" in the 13th century, people who were seeking asylum here lacked water and they prayed Mary for help. It is said that a stream of water came out of the ground and a powerful storm forced Tatars to retreat.

== History ==
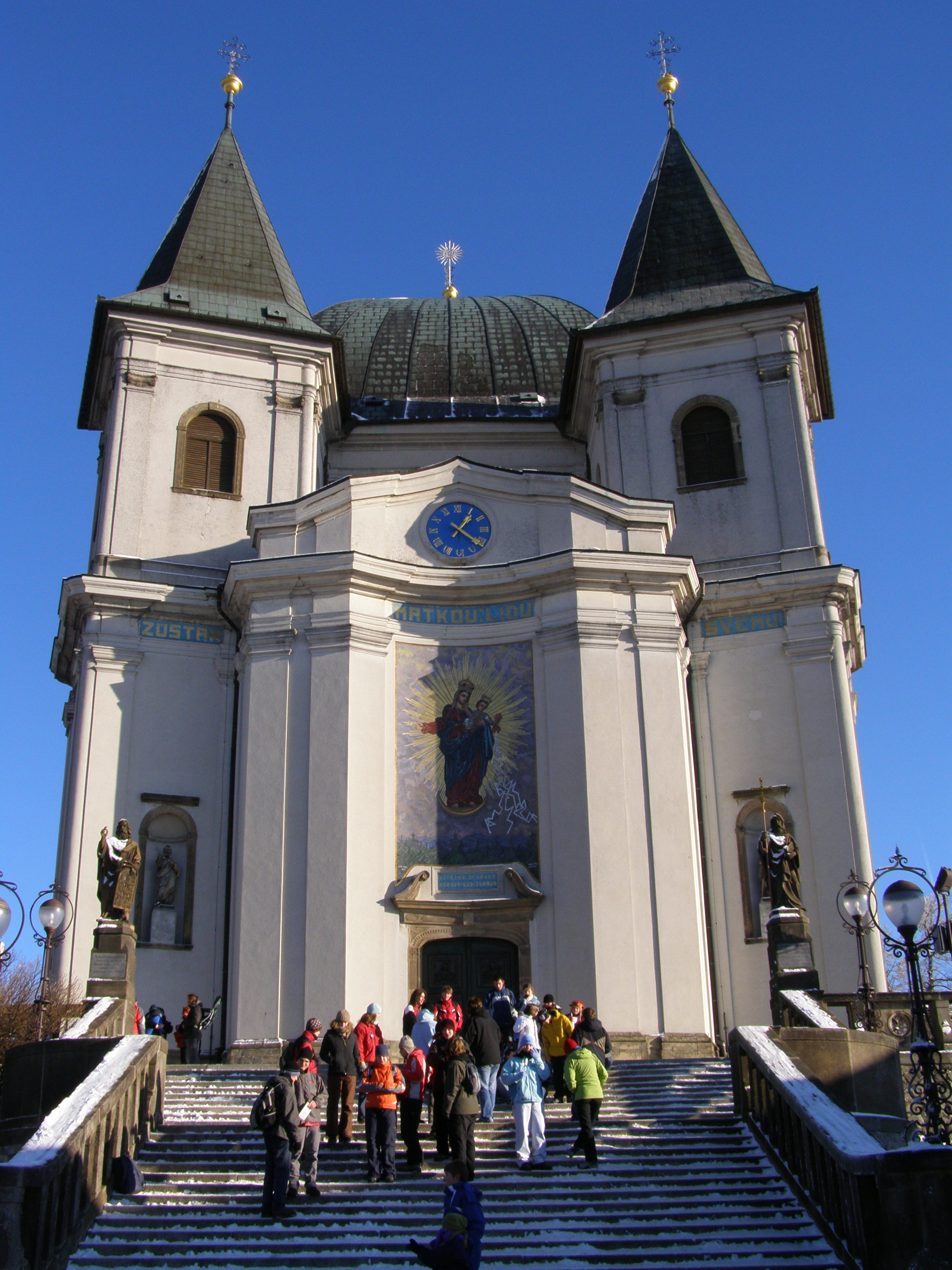
Basilica of the Assumption of the Virgin Mary

On the hilltop is an ancient hill fort with a ditch and defensive wall made of earth and stone, which is 4–8 metres high. The fortification was first built by the people of the Lusatian culture c. 1200 BC. In later centuries it was destroyed and rebuilt several times, including by the Celts.

The first medieval chapel of Virgin Mary was probably built by the miners and was first mentioned in 1544 without any reference to the legend, which probably originated from the existence of massive walls, chapel and spring near the hilltop. At the time when the legend was first mentioned by Bohuslav Balbín (1665), it was a clear analogy to the contemporary war with the Turks. After another successful war against Turks there were an increasing number of pilgrims visiting Hostýn, so a new basilica was built in 1721–1748 together with Via Crucis, the pilgrims' hospice and other facilities.

Another chapel was built next to the spring of "holy water", which was believed by locals to possess a healing effect. This led to the nickname "Moravian Lourdes" for Hostýn. A 240-step stairway from the spring to the basilica was constructed in 1909.

In 1903 new open-air Stations of the Cross were built by the architect Dušan Jurkovič, and are now a major tourist attraction for the region, together with the basilica itself, attracting not only Catholic pilgrims but thousands of other tourists. The largest crowds at the site were in August 1912, when the main statue of Virgin Mary was crowned by the golden crown blessed in Rome by Pius X. The number of pilgrims and other visitors was estimated to be 200,000 within ten days.

== Geology ==
The entire massif consists of so-called Hostýn geological formation. The Hostýn hill oneself consists mainly of paleogenic flysch sandstone. The base (foot) and saddles are made partly of deluvial soil-stone-clay deposits.
