= List of castles in the Zlín Region =

This is a list of castles and chateaux located in the Zlín Region of the Czech Republic.

== A ==
- Arnoltovice Castle

== B ==
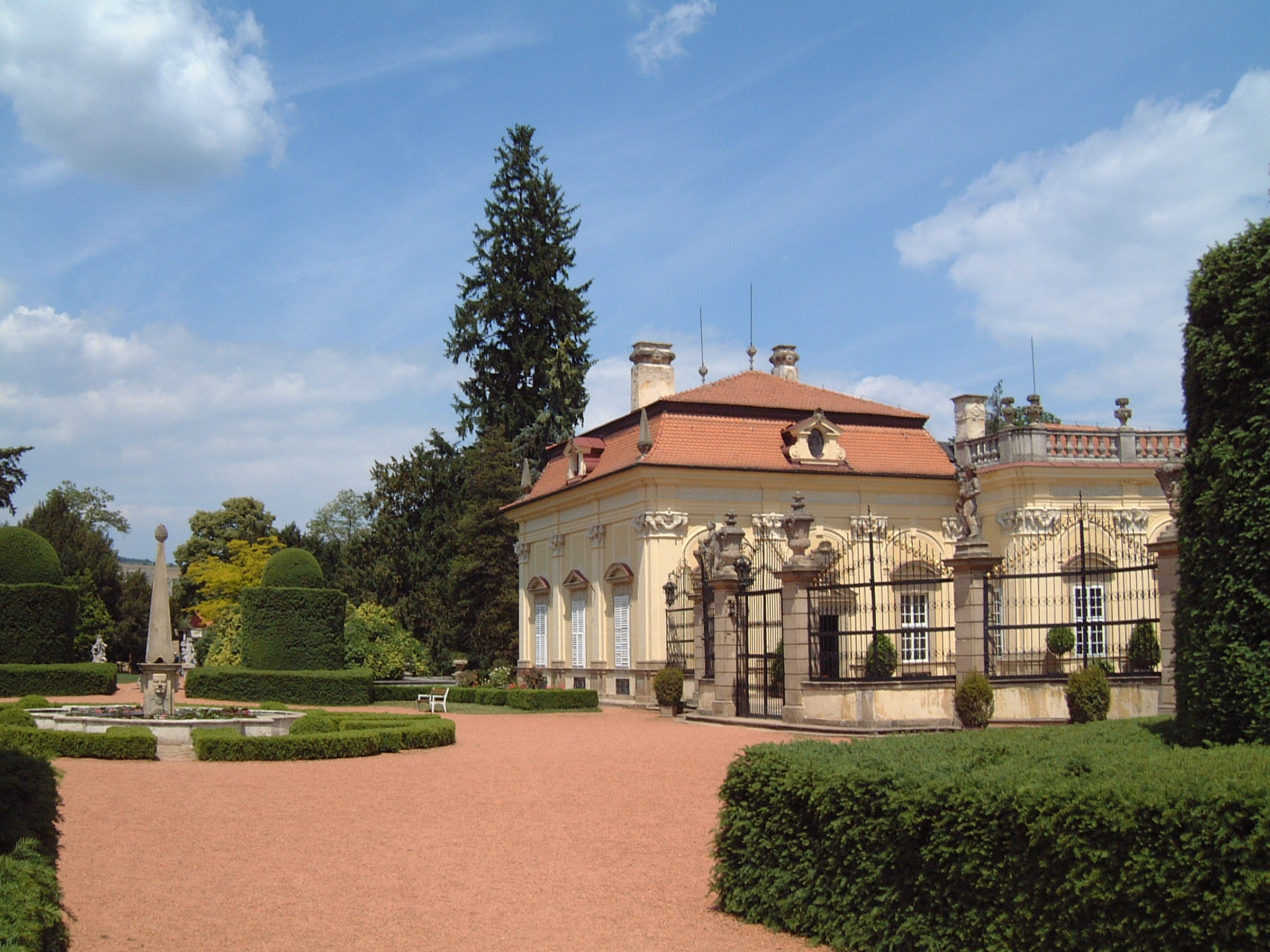
Buchlovice Chateau.

- Bánov Castle
- Bílovice Chateau
- Branky Chateau
- Brumov Castle
- Buchlov Castle
- Buchlovice Chateau
- Bystřice pod Hostýnem Chateau

== C ==
- Cetechovice Chateau
- Chlum Castle, Bílavsko
- Choryně Chateau
- Chropyně Chateau
- Cimburk u Koryčan Castle

== D ==
- Dřínov Chateau

== E ==
- Engelsberk Castle

== H ==
- Holešov Chateau
- Hoštice Chateau
- Hošťálková Chateau
- Hovězí Chateau
- Hradiště Castle, Loučka
- Hrádek u Přílep Castle
- Hulín Castle

== K ==
- Kasařov Castle
- Kelč Chateau
- Klenov Castle
- Krásno nad Bečvou Chateau
- Kroměříž Archbishop's Palace
- Křídlo Castle
- Kurovice Castle
- Kvasice Chateau

== L ==
- Lešná Chateau
- Litenčice Chateau
- Loučka Chateau
- Luhačovice Chateau
- Lukov Castle

== M ==
- Malenovice Castle
- Morkovice Chateau

== N ==
- Napajedla Chateau
- Nezdenice Chateau
- Nový Světlov Chateau
- Nový Šaumburk Castle

== O ==
- Obřany Castle

== P ==
- Pačlavice Chateau
- Přílepy Chateau
- Pulčín Castle

== R ==
- Rožnov Castle
- Rýsov Castle

== S ==
- Šaumburk Castle
- Skalný Castle
- Slavičín Chateau
- Starý Světlov Castle
- Střílky Castle
- Střílky Chateau

== U ==
- Uherský Brod Castle
- Uherský Brod Chateau

== V ==
- Valašské Meziříčí Chateau
- Velký Ořechov Chateau
- Věžky Chateau
- Vizovice Chateau
- Vsetín Chateau

== Z ==
- Zdislavice Chateau
- Zlín Chateau
- Zuvačov Castle
- Žeranovice Castle
- Žeranovice Chateau

== See also ==
- List of castles in the Czech Republic
- List of castles in Europe
- List of castles
