= Úboč (mountain) =

Mountain in Slovakia

Coordinates: 48°55′48″N 21°03′49″E

Highest point
- Elevation: 649.3

Geography
- Country: Slovakia
- Region: Prešov
- District: Prešov

Úboč (649.3 m a.s.l.) is a Mountain in the Šarišská vrchovina, part of the Podhôľno-Magurská area. It is located above the village Klenov, approximately 13 km west of Prešov.

== Location ==
It is situated in the southern part of the central part of the Šarišská vrchovina, in the geomorphological subunit Sedlická Brázda. The mountain is located in the Prešov Region, in the Prešov District and within the cadastral area of the village Klenov. The nearest settlement is the village Klenov located to the southwest, with Miklušovce to the southeast and Kvačany to the northeast.

== Description ==
The slope lies on the southern edge of the Sedlická brázda, in a ridge leading east from Mestické Hill (828 m above sea level) through Banský vrch (662 m above sea level) to Zajačia Hora (635 m above sea level). To the south are Bokšov (810 m above sea level), Suchý vrch (799 m above sea level), Bujanov (756 m above sea level), Bystrá (766 m above sea level) and Šľuchta (781 m above sea level), to the west are Holý hřbok (677 m above sea level), Roháčka (1,029 m above sea level), Čierna hora (1,025 m above sea level), Mestické (828 m above sea level) and Banský vrch (662 m above sea level), to the north are Zimná hora (664 m above sea level), Grejnár (658 m above sea level), Osičie (575 m above sea level) and Nad dolinkami (537 m above sea level) and to the east are Bekovec (502 m above sea level), Zadný dol (554 m above sea level), Rešetka (577 m above sea level) and Zajačia hora (635 m above sea level). The area belongs to the Hornád river basin, where water is drained from the northern slopes by the Kvačiansky stream heading to Svinka, and from the southern parts by the Sopotnica stream. There is no marked hiking trail to the summit.

=== Views ===
The slightly flat summit is covered with meadow, offering a panoramic view. Under suitable conditions, one can see the surrounding peaks of the Šarišská vrchovina and the nearby Čierna hora, as well as the Slanské vrchy, Čergov, Bachureň, and Branisko.

== Access ==
There is no marked tourist route to the summit, but access is possible from the nearby village Klenov.
