= Věžky =

Věžky may refer to places in the Czech Republic:

- Věžky (Kroměříž District), a municipality and village in the Zlín Region
- Věžky (Přerov District), a municipality and village in the Olomouc Region
