= Pozlovice =

- Market town
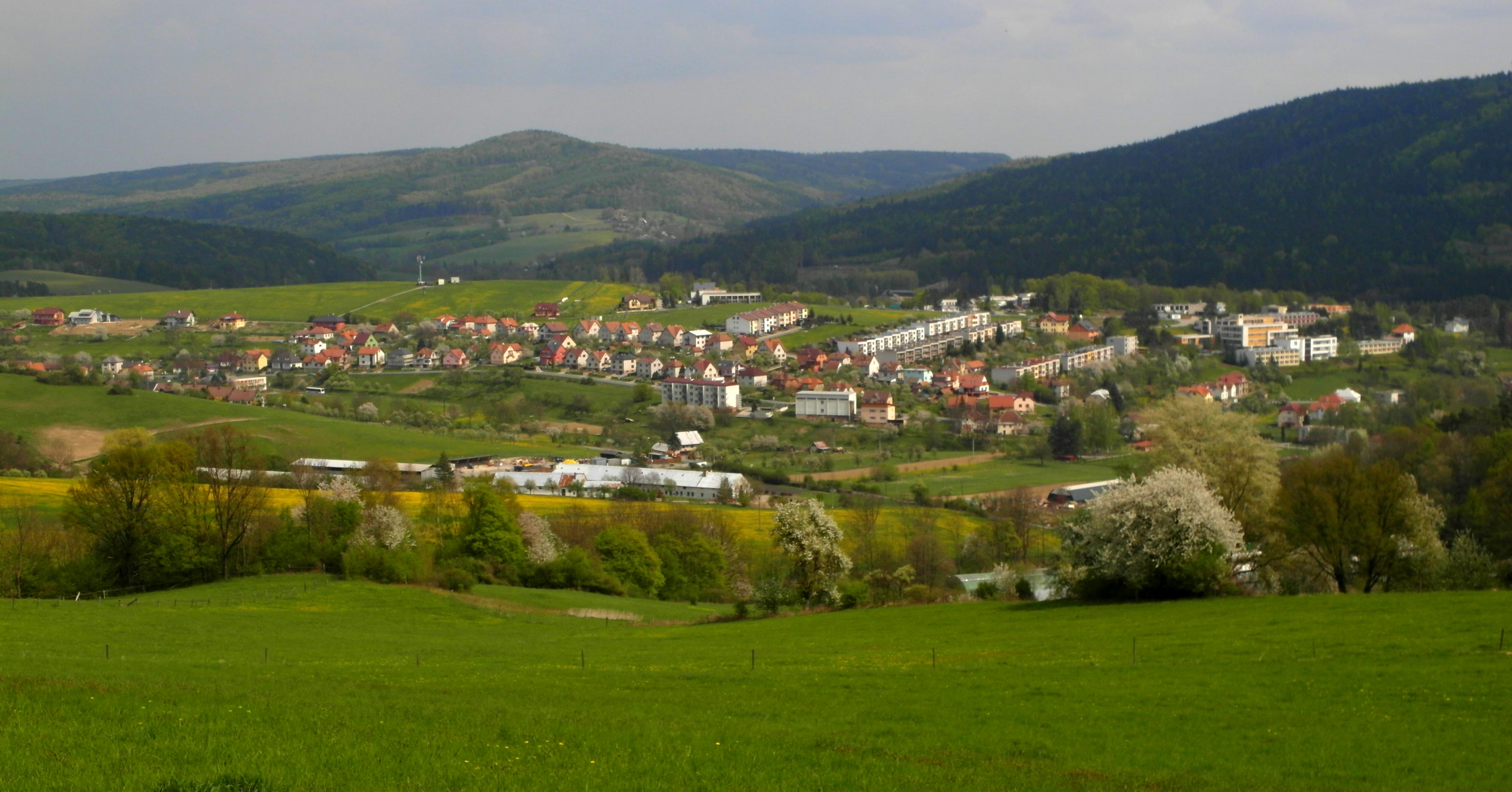
- General view

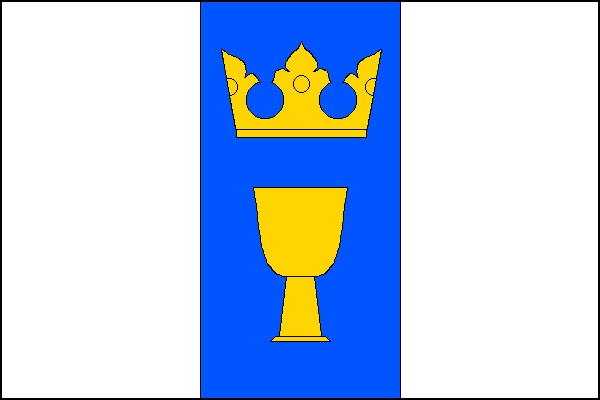
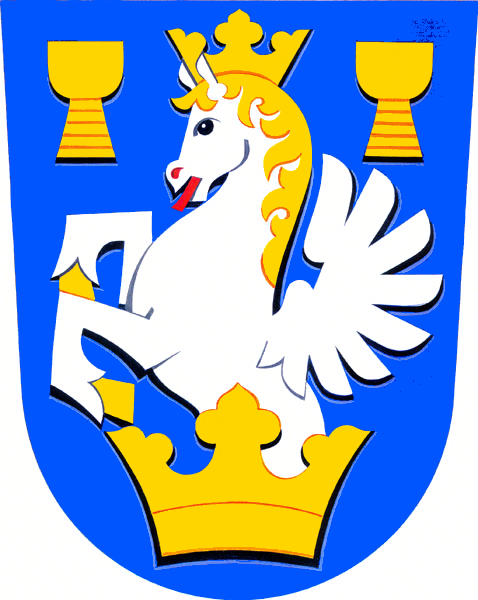
- Flag Coat of arms

- Location in the Czech Republic
- Coordinates: 49°7′45″N 17°46′9″E
- Country: Czech Republic
- Region: Zlín
- District: Zlín
- First mentioned: 1412

Area
  - Total: 9.59 km^{2} (3.70 sq mi)
- Elevation: 302 m (991 ft)

Population (2026-01-01)
  - Total: 1,322
  - Density: 138/km^{2} (357/sq mi)
- Time zone: UTC+1 (CET)
  - Summer (DST): UTC+2 (CEST)
- Postal code: 763 26
- Website: www.pozlovice.cz

Pozlovice (Czech pronunciation: [ˈpozlovɪtsɛ]) is a market town in Zlín District in the Zlín Region of the Czech Republic. It has about 1,300 inhabitants.

== Geography ==
Pozlovice is located about 13 kilometres (8 mi) southeast of Zlín. It lies in the Vizovice Highlands. The highest point is the hill Obětová at 511 m (1,677 ft). The streams Luhačovický potok and Pozlovický potok flow through the market town. The eastern part of the municipal territory lies within the Bílé Karpaty Protected Landscape Area.

The Luhačovice Reservoir is built on the Luhačovický potok. It was built in 1912–1930. Its primary task was flood protection, but today it is mainly used for sports and recreational purposes.

== History ==
The first written mention of Pozlovice is from 1287. Until the first half of the 17th century, the village was part of the Starý Světlov estate. From the first half of the 17th century until 1945, it was part of the Luhačovice estate, owned by the Serényi family. In 1758, Pozlovice was promoted to a market town by Empress Maria Theresa.

== Demographics ==
Historical population

Year	Pop.	±%
1869	498	—
1880	524	+5.2%
1890	574	+9.5%
1900	616	+7.3%
1910	715	+16.1%

Year	Pop.	±%
1921	651	−9.0%
1930	741	+13.8%
1950	800	+8.0%
1961	877	+9.6%
1970	924	+5.4%

Year	Pop.	±%
1980	946	+2.4%
1991	1,062	+12.3%
2001	1,176	+10.7%
2011	1,214	+3.2%
2021	1,279	+5.4%

Source: Censuses

== Transport ==
There are no railways or major roads passing through the municipality.

== Sights ==
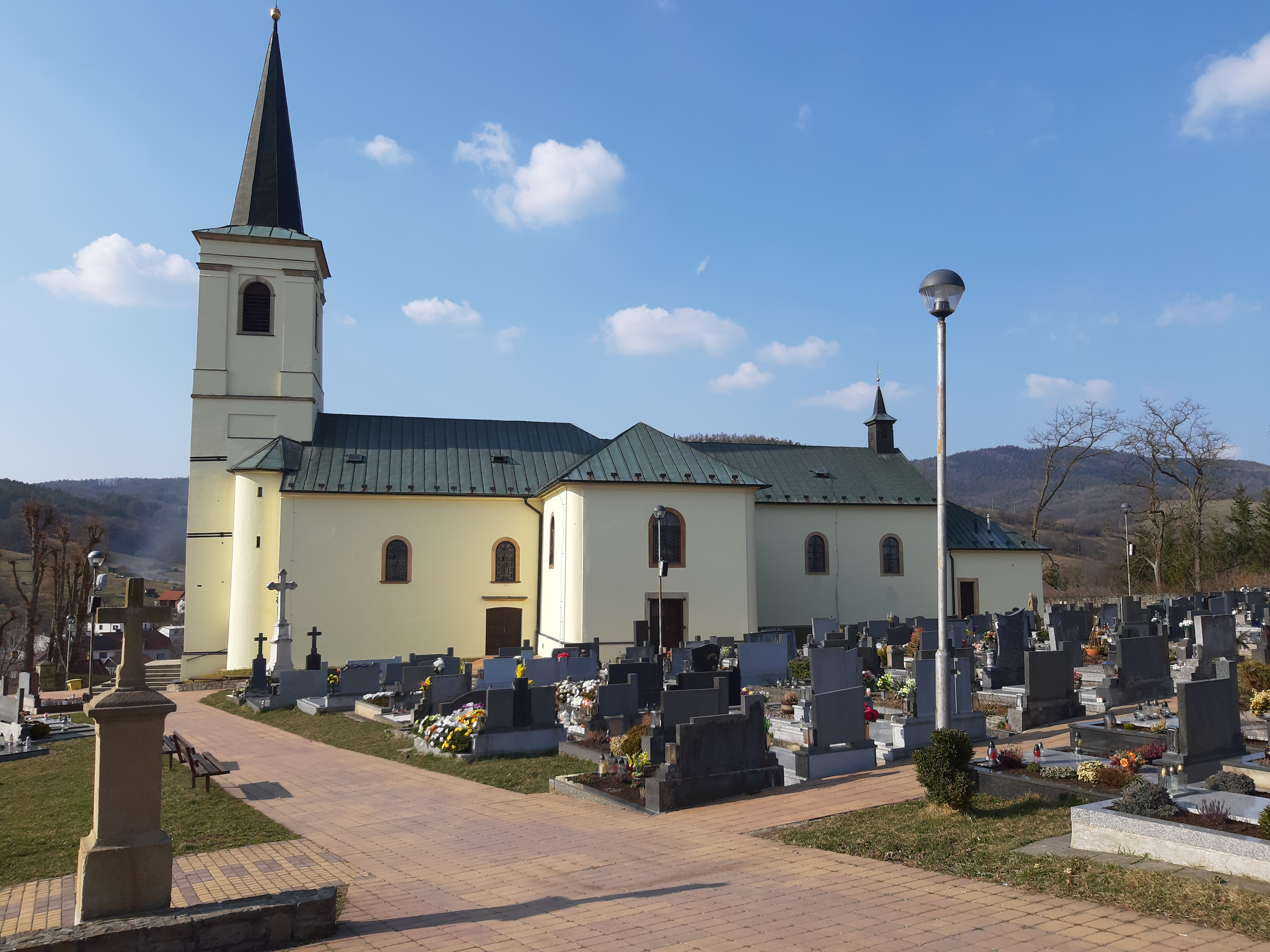
Church of Saint Martin

The main cultural landmark of Pozlovice is the Church of Saint Martin. It was built in the 17th century on the site of an older medieval church.

== Twin towns – sister cities ==
Pozlovice is twinned with:

- Rajecké Teplice, Slovakia
