= Obřany Castle =

Castle in Zlín, Czech Republic

- Hostýnské vrchy, Czech Republic
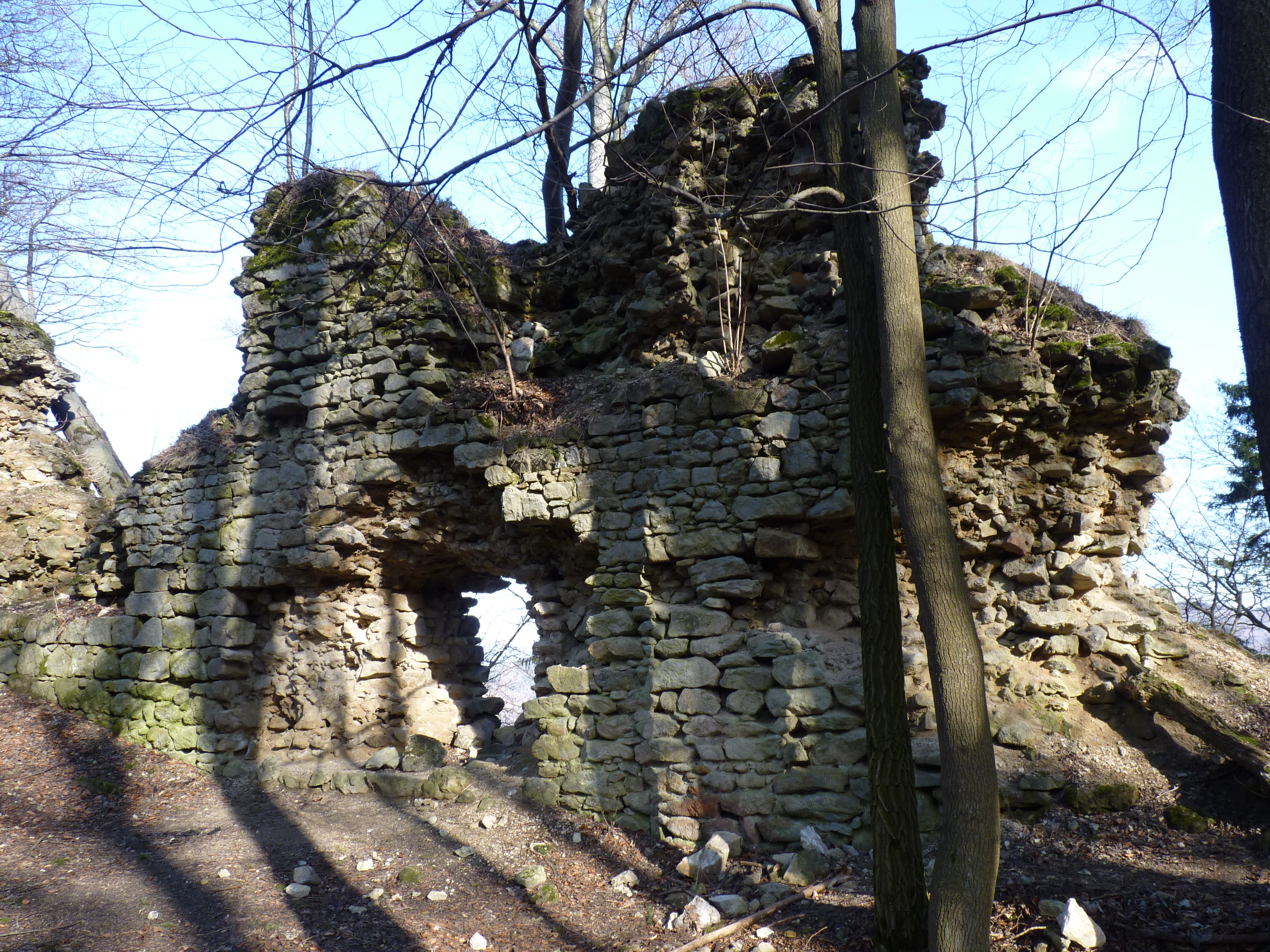

Site information
- Type: Castle
- Open to the public: yes
- Condition: ruin

Location
- Coordinates: 49.366°N 17.732°E

Site history
- Built: before 1365

Obřany Castle (Czech: Hrad Obřany) is a ruined castle near the town of Bystřice pod Hostýnem in the Zlín Region of the Czech Republic. It is classified as a cultural monument of the Czech Republic.

== See also ==
- List of castles in the Zlín Region
