= Šaumburk Castle =

Šaumburk
- Rajnochovice, Czech Republic
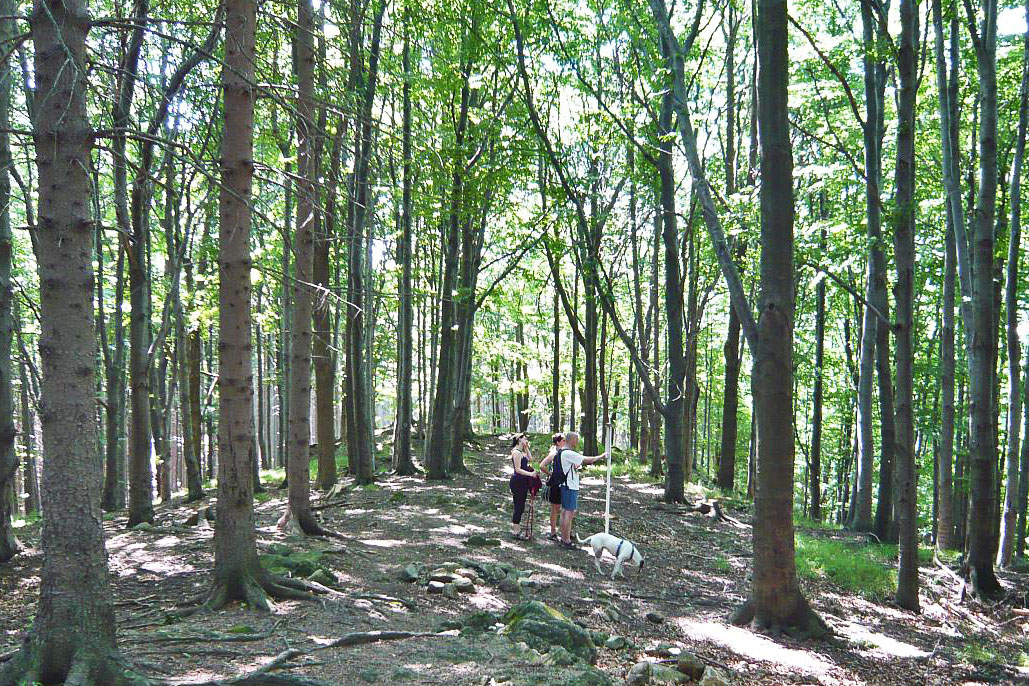

Site information
- Type: Castle
- Open to the public: yes
- Condition: ruin

Location
- Coordinates: 49°24′48″N 17°47′53″E

Site history
- Built: before 1325

Šaumburk Castle is a ruined castle in the Rajnochovice municipality in the Zlín Region of the Czech Republic. It is protected as a cultural monument.

It was built by Bishop Bruno von Schauenburg, who named it after his ancestral seat in Lower Saxony.

== See also ==
- List of castles in the Zlín Region
