= Podhradní Lhota =

- Municipality
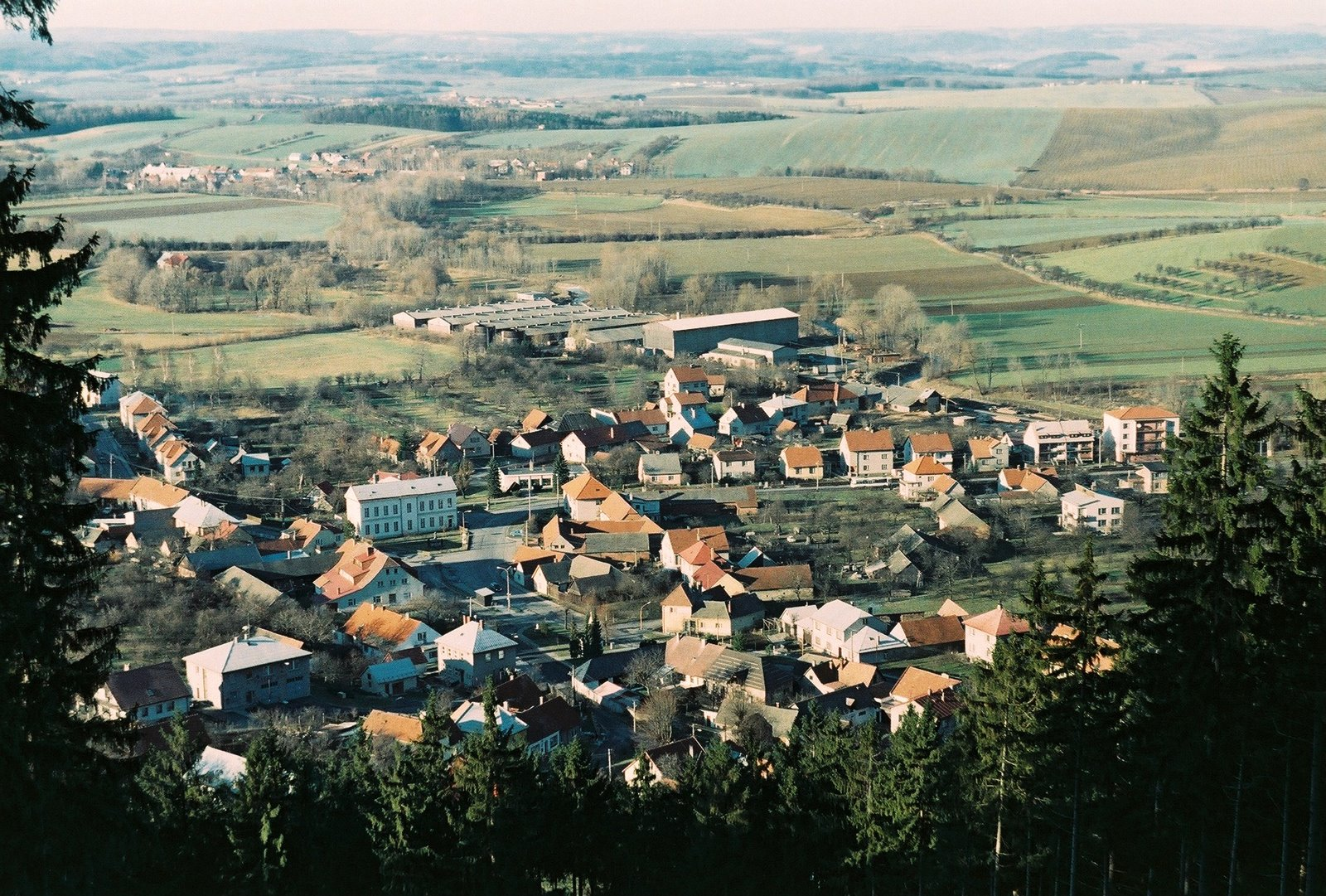
- View from the south

- Flag Coat of arms

- Location in the Czech Republic
- Coordinates: 49°25′15″N 17°47′42″E
- Country: Czech Republic
- Region: Zlín
- District: Kroměříž
- First mentioned: 1271

Area
  - Total: 3.81 km^{2} (1.47 sq mi)
- Elevation: 386 m (1,266 ft)

Population (2026-01-01)
  - Total: 459
  - Density: 120/km^{2} (312/sq mi)
- Time zone: UTC+1 (CET)
  - Summer (DST): UTC+2 (CEST)
- Postal code: 768 71
- Website: www.podhradnilhota.cz

Podhradní Lhota is a municipality and village in Kroměříž District in the Zlín Region of the Czech Republic. It has about 500 inhabitants.

Podhradní Lhota lies approximately 33 kilometres (21 mi) north-east of Kroměříž, 23 km (14 mi) north-east of Zlín, and 254 km (158 mi) east of Prague.

== Demographics ==
Historical population
Year	Pop.	±%
1869	504	—
1880	508	+0.8%
1890	467	−8.1%
1900	468	+0.2%
1910	491	+4.9%
1921	511	+4.1%
1930	547	+7.0%
1950	530	−3.1%
1961	582	+9.8%
1970	552	−5.2%
1980	538	−2.5%
1991	515	−4.3%
2001	533	+3.5%
2011	512	−3.9%
2021	430	−16.0%
Source: Censuses

== Sights ==
Ruins of the Nový Šaumburk castle is located in the municipality.
