= Bruno von Schauenburg =

Bishop of Olomouc

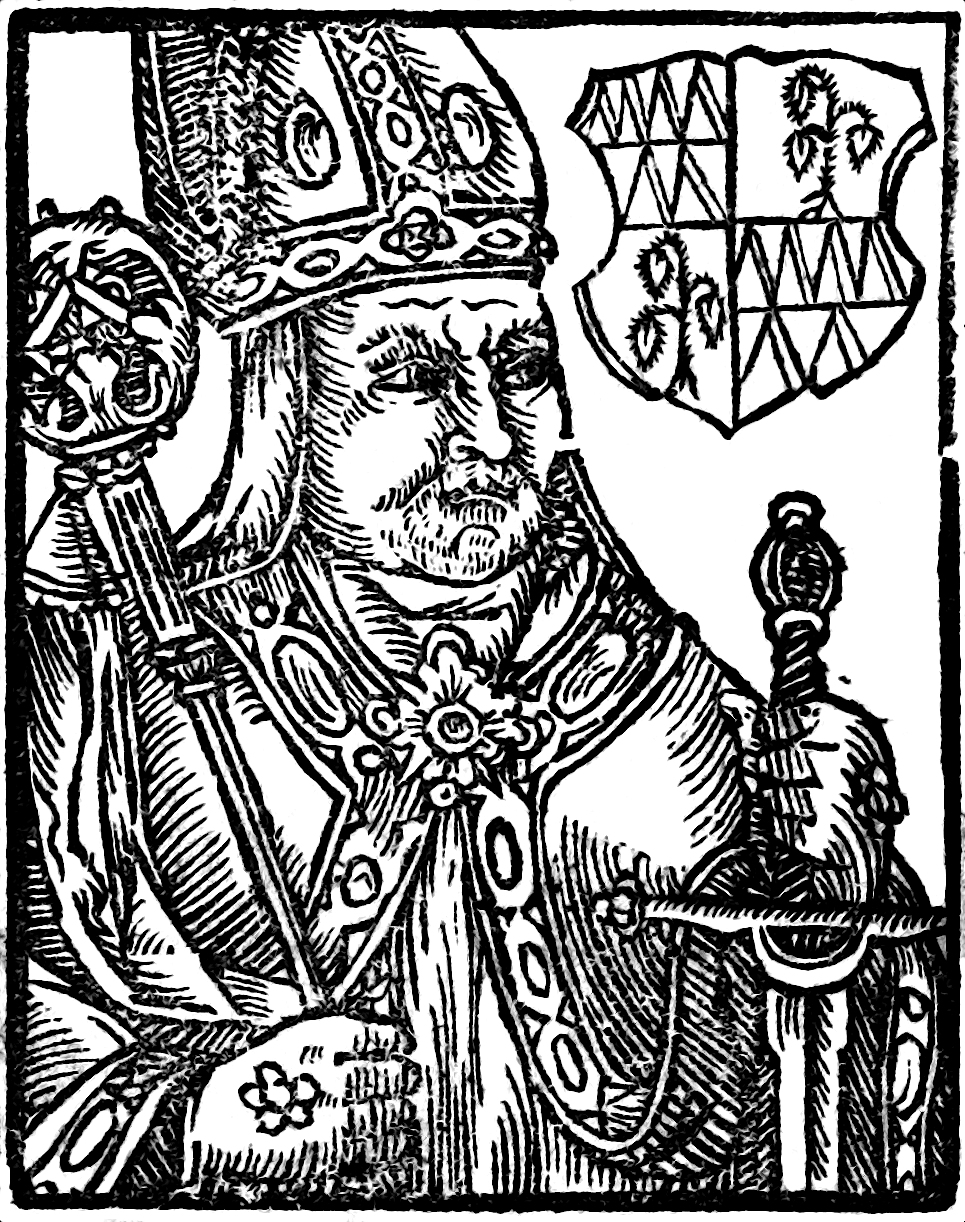
Bruno von Schauenburg.

Bruno von Schauenburg (also known as Bruno Olomucensis; 1205 – 1 or 17 February 1281 in Kroměříž) was a nobleman and Catholic priest of German descent, bishop of Olomouc in 1245–1281. He was one of the main advisors and diplomats of the Czech kings: Wenceslaus I of Bohemia, and especially Ottokar II of Bohemia, for whom he was the "right hand". As a bishop in history of Moravia he is known thanks to colonization and his role in founding many new towns.

== Life ==
He came from an old North German noble family, and was born at the family seat of Schauenburg castle, on the river Weser in Lower Saxony, about 50 km southwest of Rinteln. He was born as the third son of the Holstein and Schoenenberg Count Adolf III, between 1200 and 1205. He performed many church functions. In 1229 he became a priest of the cathedral chapter in Lübeck. In 1236 he was a parish priest in Hamburg, and in 1238 he was elected pastor in Magdeburg. However, his opponent in this election was wounded and the accused Bruno escaped. In addition, the Magdeburg Archbishop excommunicated him. Bruno, however, went to Rome and obtained from Pope and forgiveness. In 1244, the Pope Innocent IV appointed him a papal priest. On 20 September 1245, the same Pope appointed him a Bishop of Olomouc. It ended with numerous disputes regarding the election of the local bishop. He was ordained bishop in 1247. This year, the Bishop was also accepted by the Czech King Wenceslaus I. Bishop Bruno received special favor from the king after he stood on the side of Wenceslaus I. (Václav I.) in his dispute with his son Przemysl (Přemysl) and later helped to reconcile father and son.

In ecclesiastical matters, Bishop Bruno actively sought to reform the ecclesiastical administration. He renewed the old and established a new deanery. He called synod, he established new church offices. He also dealt with church property. Near the old settlement, he founded a new town of Kroměříž with a castle. After the fire damaged the Saint Wenceslas Cathedral in Olomouc in 1265, he renewed it in the Gothic style.

He is considered to be a pioneer of the colonization of medieval Moravia, he had previously inhabited uninhabited areas, mainly in the central part (Drahanská vrchovina) and in the north of Moravia (areas between Oder and Ostravice). For example, in his 1267 letter, for the first time Ostrava (Moravian) was mentioned. In addition to the castle in Kroměříž, he also founded the castles Mírov, Blansek, Fulštejn, Šaumburk and others. He also contributed to the founding of the towns of Uherské Hradiště and Brušperk. Most probably, his name was also called the town of Braniewo in Warmia (German: Braunsberg).

After the death of King Wenceslaus, the bishop became an adviser and diplomat of the young king Ottokar II, as well as a supporter of the royal power in Moravia (the king was also Moravian ruler). In the years 1254–1255 and 1267–1268 he accompanied the king in the Crusades to Prussia. Together with the king, Bishop Bruno sought the Pope to raise the Olomouc bishopric to the rank of archbishopric, as well as the establishment of two new bishoprics in Prussia, which were to be subordinated to him. For the King Ottokar II, he gained Styria, where in the years 1262–1269 he was the hetman. He managed to negotiate the marriage of the king with Kunigunda of Halych, granddaughter of the king Béla IV of Hungary. He supported the Pope's King Ottokar II in his efforts for the Roman royal crown. Often, he also stood in the ranks of the armies of King Ottokar II, which at the time was not yet among the clergy as extraordinary. In 1276, he persuaded King Ottokar II to intervene in Vienna Rudolf I of Germany.

In the Battle on the Marchfeld, Bishop Bruno did not participate. After the defeat of Ottokar II, he paid homage to Rudolf. He entrusted him with the administration of northern Moravia. In 1279, Bishop Bruno was ordained a bishop of Prague Tobiáš z Bechyně. Bruno von Schauenburg died in 1281. He was buried in front of the main altar in the Church of St. Maurice in Kroměříž, which he established himself.

== Works ==
Bruno wrote his Relatio de statu ecclesiae in regno alemaniae (Relation on the state of the church in the kingdom of Germany) for the Second Council of Lyon in 1274. He advised the prosecution of the crusade in eastern Europe under the general direction of King Ottokar II of Bohemia so as to bring peace at home before launching a crusade to recover the Holy Land.
