= Rajnochovice =

- Municipality
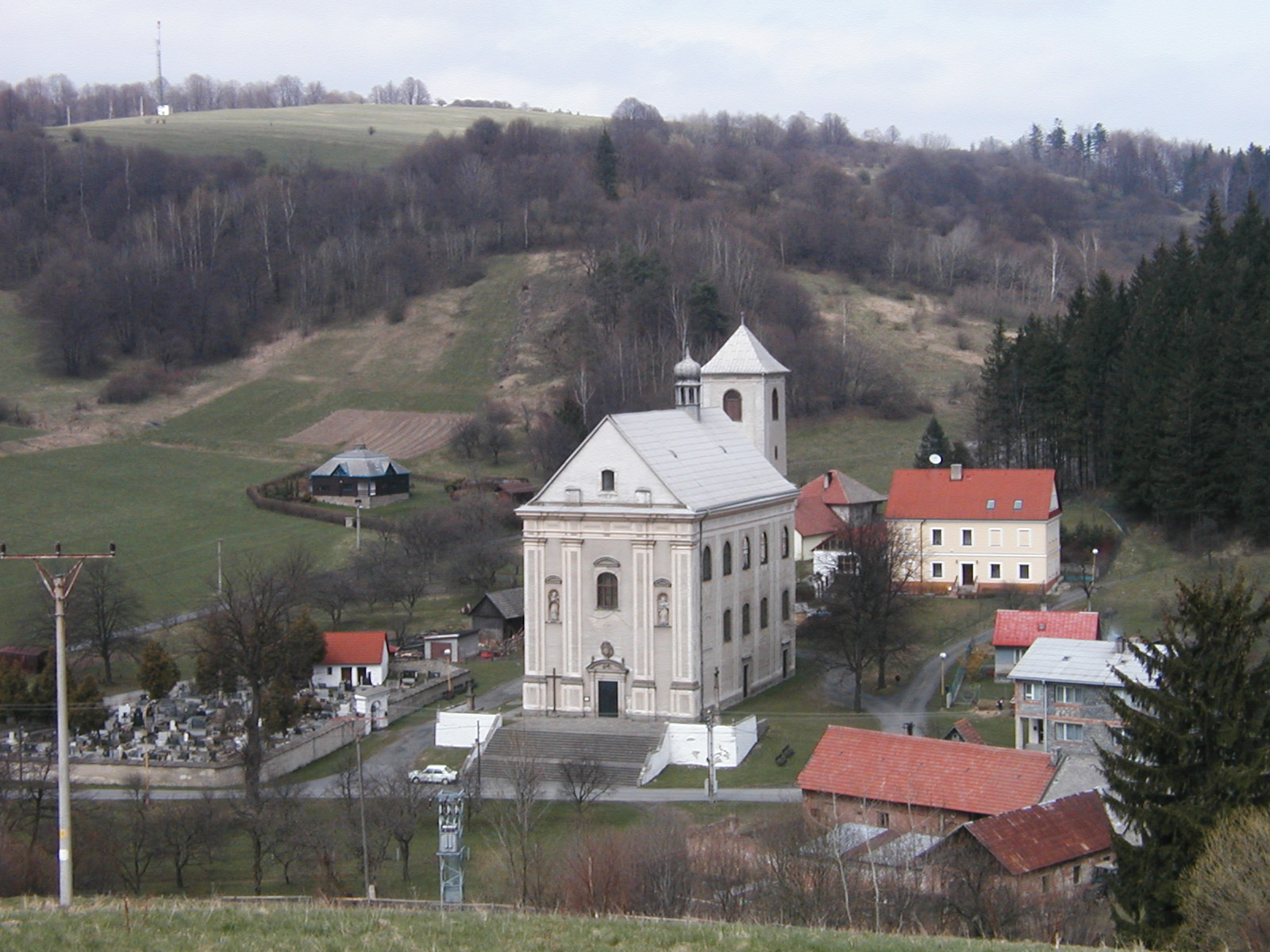
- Church of Saint Anne

- Flag Coat of arms

- Location in the Czech Republic
- Coordinates: 49°24′47″N 17°48′47″E
- Country: Czech Republic
- Region: Zlín
- District: Kroměříž
- Founded: 1721

Area
  - Total: 41.43 km^{2} (16.00 sq mi)
- Elevation: 420 m (1,380 ft)

Population (2026-01-01)
  - Total: 535
  - Density: 12.9/km^{2} (33.4/sq mi)
- Time zone: UTC+1 (CET)
  - Summer (DST): UTC+2 (CEST)
- Postal code: 768 71
- Website: www.rajnochovice.cz

Rajnochovice is a municipality and village in Kroměříž District in the Zlín Region of the Czech Republic. It has about 500 inhabitants.

== Etymology ==
Rajnochovice was named after the Rajnoch family, who founded the village.

== Geography ==
Rajnochovice is located about 32 kilometres (20 mi) northeast of Kroměříž and 22 km (14 mi) northeast of Zlín. It lies in the Hostýn-Vsetín Mountains. The highest point is the mountain Kelčský Javorník at 865 m (2,838 ft) above sea level. The Juhyně Stream originates here and flows across the municipality.

== History ==
Before the municipality was founded, there were several small scattered settlements in the territory. Rajnochovice was founded on 8 May 1721, when six sons of the sheep herder Mikuláš Rajnoch received permission from the bishop of Olomouc to build a house and farm on the land near the church. Soon a hammer mill was established here, but it went bankrupt already during the 18th century.

From the early 19th century until 1890, Rajnochovice was famous for the production of decorated ceramics. A narrow-gauge railway was built here to transport wood to the local sawmill in 1904–1906. In 1921, railway transport was stopped.

== Demographics ==
Historical population

Year	Pop.	±%
1869	1,053	—
1880	1,083	+2.8%
1890	1,032	−4.7%
1900	1,019	−1.3%
1910	1,119	+9.8%

Year	Pop.	±%
1921	1,107	−1.1%
1930	1,161	+4.9%
1950	820	−29.4%
1961	835	+1.8%
1970	721	−13.7%

Year	Pop.	±%
1980	638	−11.5%
1991	573	−10.2%
2001	519	−9.4%
2011	550	+6.0%
2021	499	−9.3%

Source: Censuses

== Transport ==
There are no railways or major roads passing through the municipality.

== Sport ==
There are two ski resorts in the municipality called Troják and Tesák. They are among the most popular ski resorts in the region. A cross-country track, the so-called Hostýn Highway, runs along the municipal border.

== Sights ==
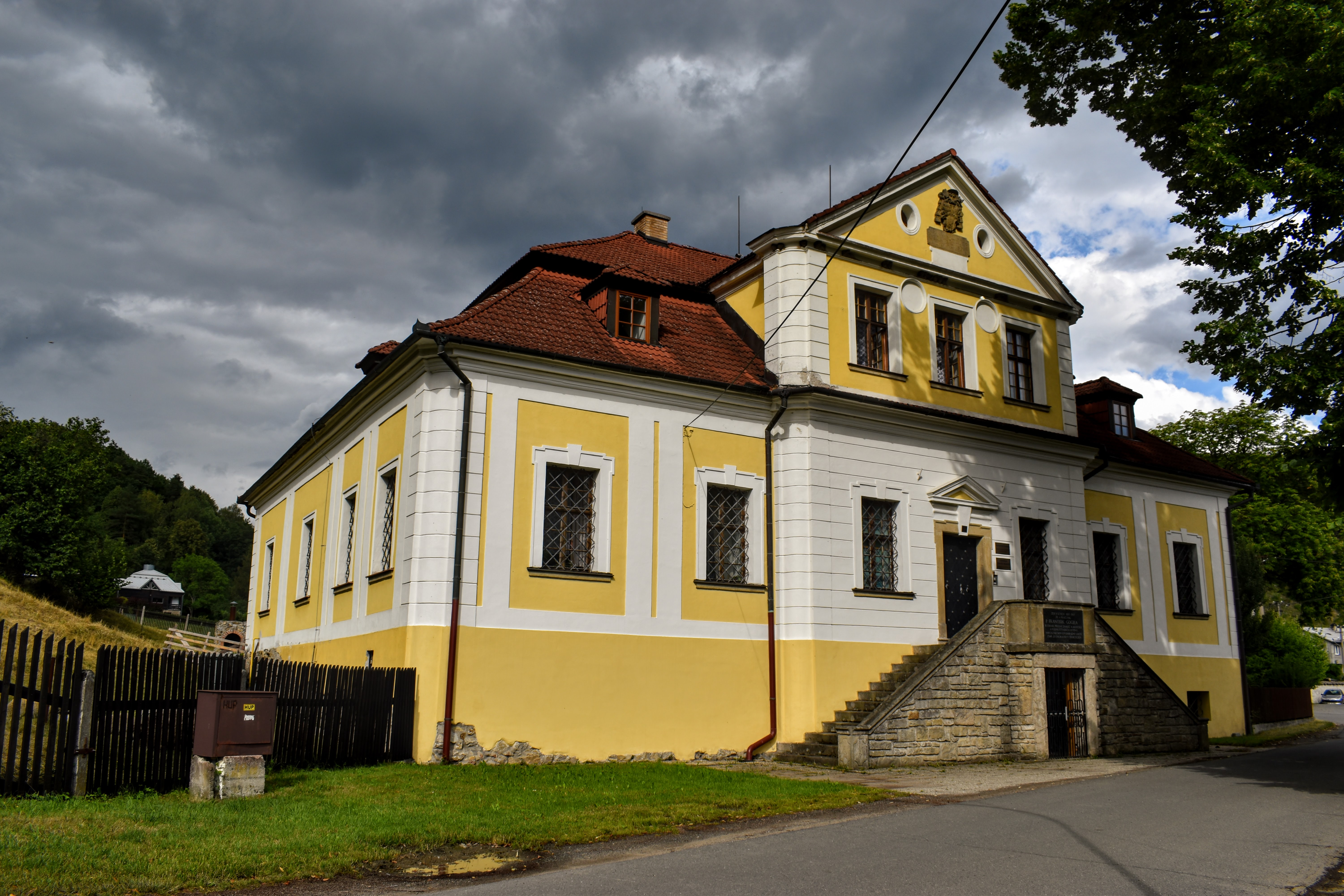
Rectory

The most important monument is the Church of Saint Anne. It was built next to an old wooden church, which probably dated from the 12th century, but fell into disrepair and its capacity was insufficient. The new church was built in the Baroque style in 1711–1716, before Rajnochovice was founded. A small castle was built together with the church near the church, but in 1727 the building became a rectory.

The Chapel of the Holy Spirit in the area of the former children's sanatorium dates from 1924.

The ruin of the Šaumburk Castle is located in the municipality. Very little of it has survived to this day.

In 2010, the operation of the narrow-gauge track was resumed on a 300 m (980 ft) long track as a tourist attraction.

On the mountain Kelčský Javorník is an eponymous observation tower. The current steel tower opened in 2015, replacing the old wooden tower. It has 156 steps.
