= Starý Světlov =

- Podhradí, Czech Republic
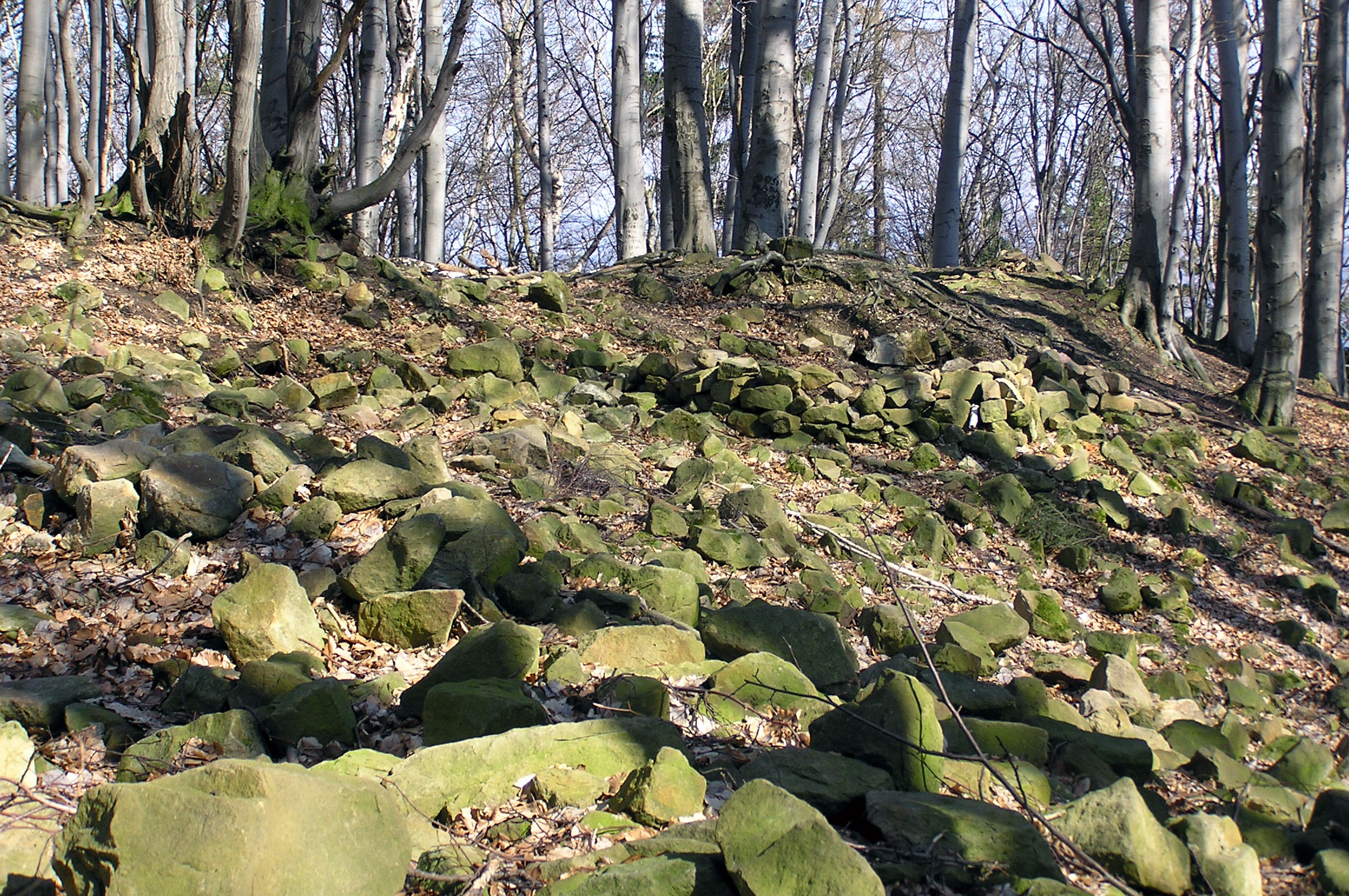

Site information
- Type: Castle
- Owner: Albertovi ze Šternberka
- Open to the public: yes
- Condition: ruin

Location
- Coordinates: 49°9′5.903″N 17°45′45.449″E

Site history
- Built: before 1360
- Materials: Stone

Starý Světlov is a ruined gothic castle in the municipality of Podhradí in the Zlín Region of the Czech Republic. It is uncertain when the castle was built, but it was first mentioned in 1360. Starý Světlov was held by local nobility and also spent time under royal control. It was abandoned by 1517 and fell into ruin. Starý Světlov received renewed attention in the 20th century with state protection as a cultural monument and archaeological investigations.

== History ==
The earliest surviving record mentioned Starý Světlov is dated to 1360. At that point it belonged to Albert ze Šternberka. It was one of the most important castles in Moravia. By 1423 it was held by Sigismund, King of Bohemia. He subsequently gave it to his wife, Barbara of Cilli. The castle's ownership changed several times and by 1517 it was abandoned.

It is protected as a cultural monument, which was conferred in 1958. Excavations were undertaken at the castle by the Muzeum jihovýchodní Moravy ve Zlíně and Archeologickým ústavem AV ČR v Brn ěin 1983. Conservation work has been ongoing at the site since 2013.

== Location and layout ==
The castle was built in the Vizovice Highlands at an altitude of 600 metres (2,000 ft) above sea level. Starý Světlov was enclosed by a stone curtain wall, creating a roughly oval footprint. This main part of the castle contained a palace and ancillary buildings. Beyond the wall was a 15-metre (49 ft) wide moat. An oblong outwork was located along the south-west approach to the castle.

== See also ==
- List of castles in the Zlín Region
