= Nový Šaumburk =

Castle in Podhradní Lhota, Czech Republic

- Podhradní Lhota, Czech Republic
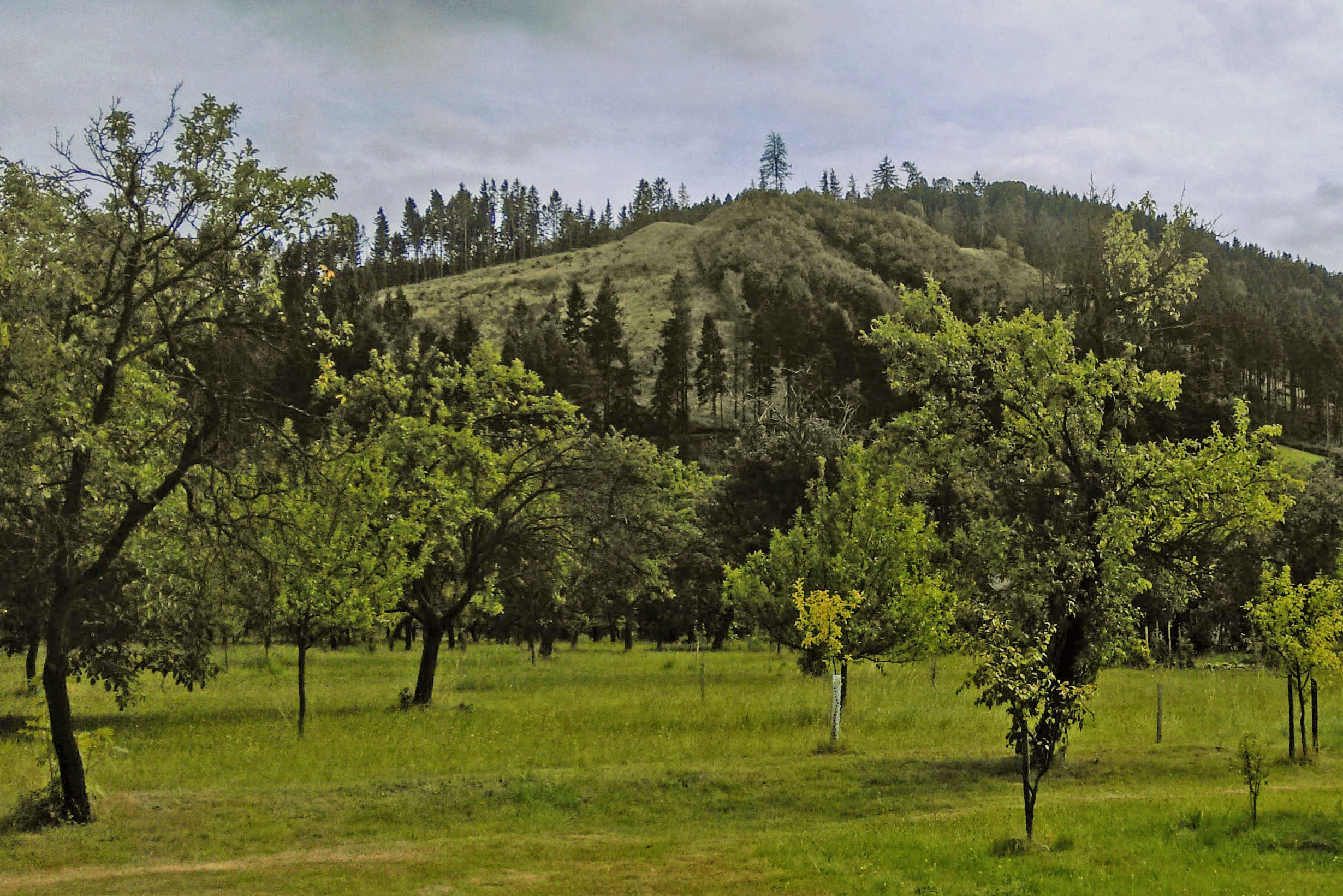

Site information
- Type: Castle
- Open to the public: yes
- Condition: ruin

Location
- Coordinates: 49°24′57.59″N 17°47′54.65″E

Site history
- Built: before 1307

Nový Šaumburk, also called Zubříč, is a ruined castle in the municipality of Podhradní Lhota in the Zlín Region of the Czech Republic. It is protected as a cultural monument, which was conferred in 1958.

== See also ==
- List of castles in the Zlín Region
