= Cetechovice =

- Municipality
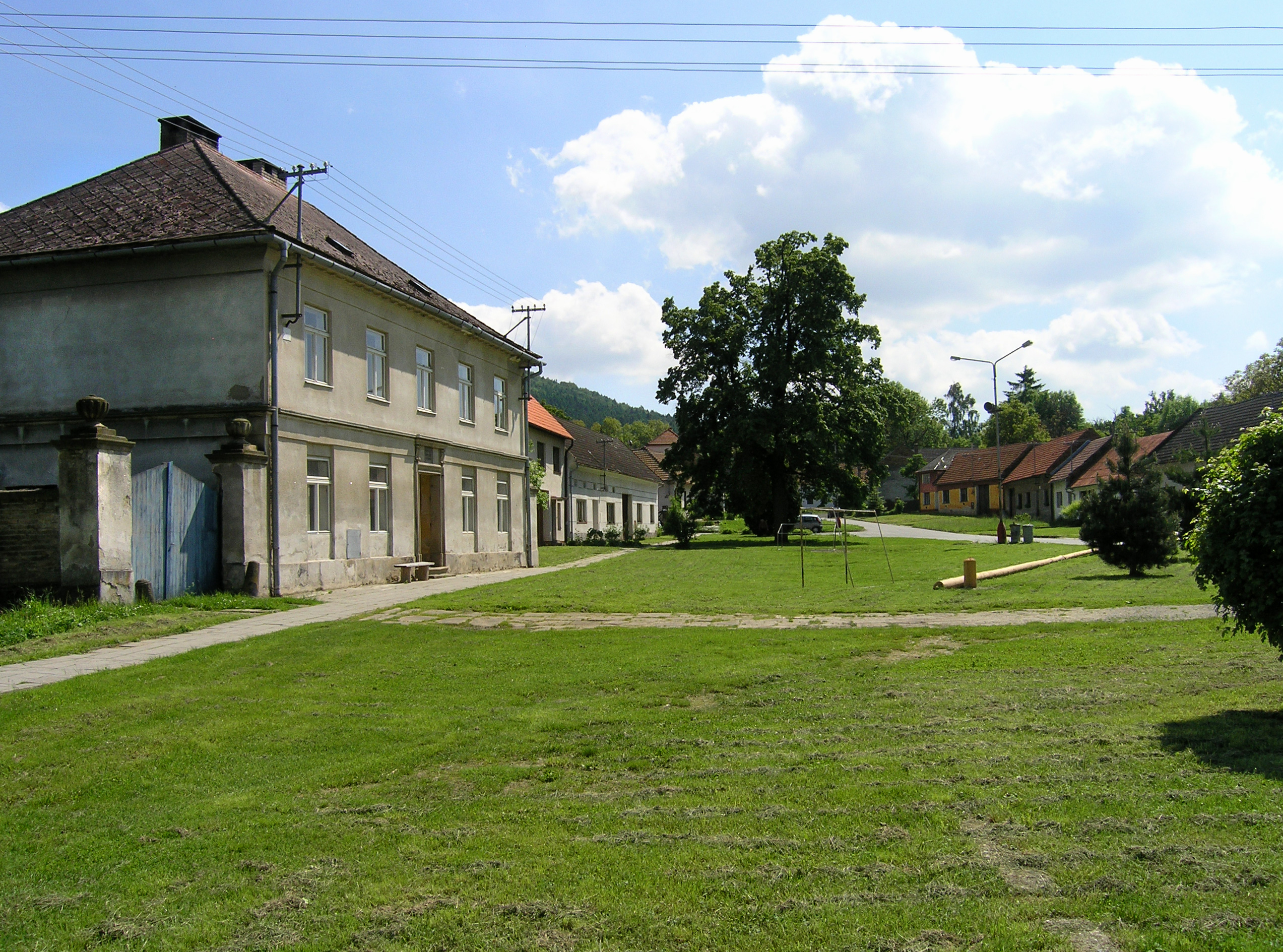
- Centre of Cetechovice

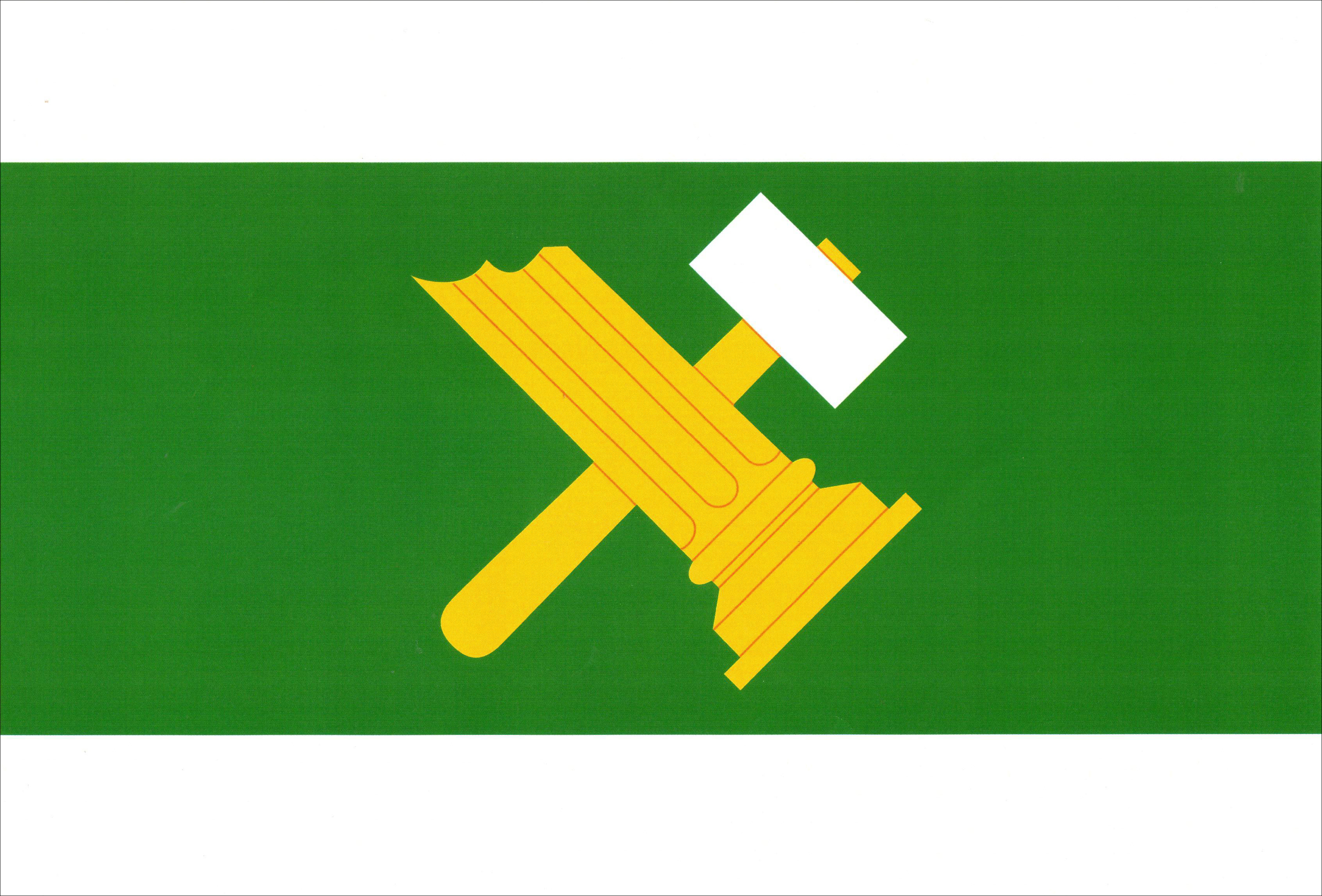
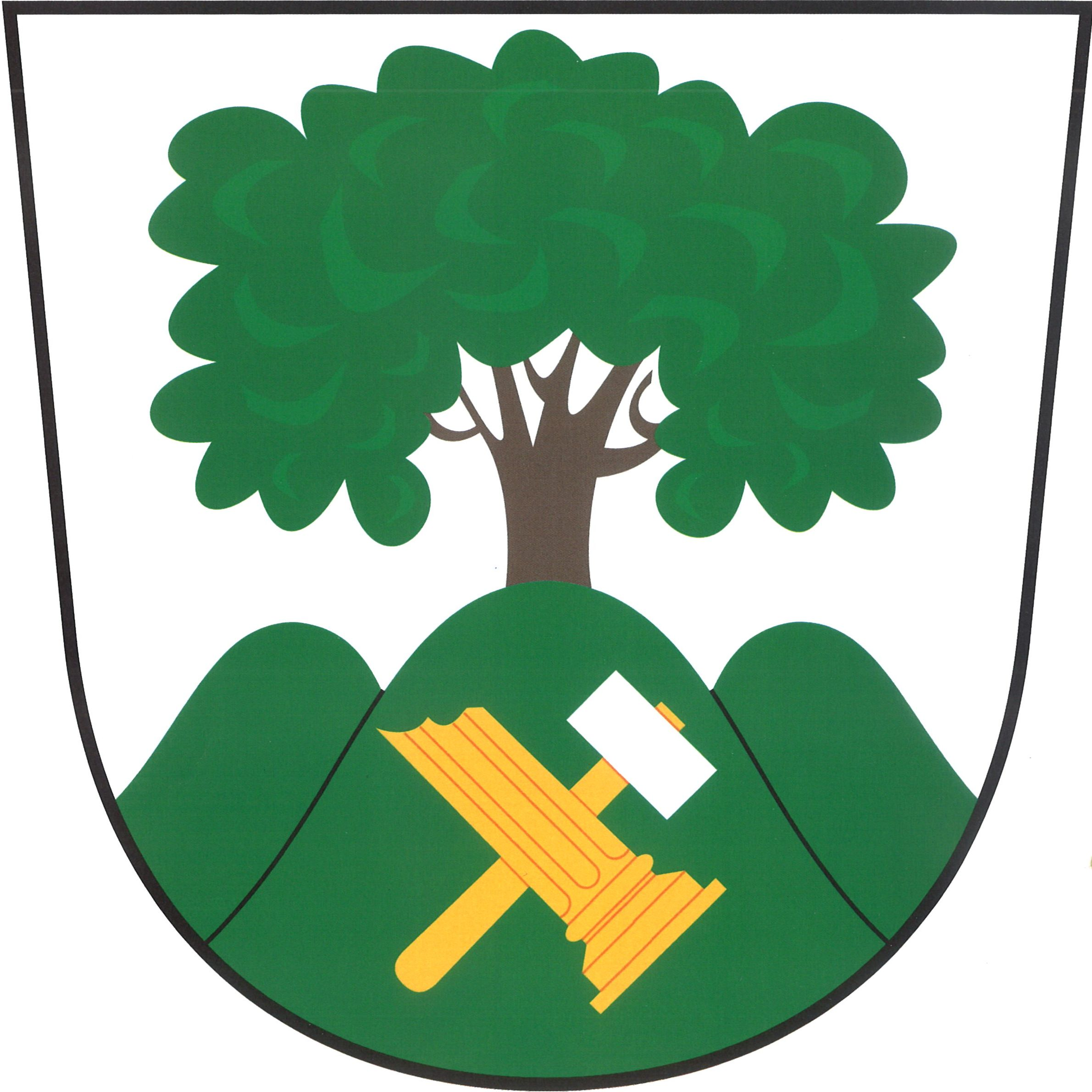
- Flag Coat of arms

- Location in the Czech Republic
- Coordinates: 49°10′20″N 17°15′41″E
- Country: Czech Republic
- Region: Zlín
- District: Kroměříž
- First mentioned: 1141

Area
  - Total: 7.49 km^{2} (2.89 sq mi)
- Elevation: 328 m (1,076 ft)

Population (2026-01-01)
  - Total: 201
  - Density: 26.8/km^{2} (69.5/sq mi)
- Time zone: UTC+1 (CET)
  - Summer (DST): UTC+2 (CEST)
- Postal code: 768 02
- Website: www.cetechovice.cz

Cetechovice is a municipality and village in Kroměříž District in the Zlín Region of the Czech Republic. It has about 200 inhabitants.

Cetechovice lies approximately 16 kilometres (10 mi) south-west of Kroměříž, 30 km (19 mi) west of Zlín, and 229 km (142 mi) south-east of Prague.

== Demographics ==
Historical population
Year	Pop.	±%
1869	528	—
1880	600	+13.6%
1890	587	−2.2%
1900	566	−3.6%
1910	564	−0.4%
1921	581	+3.0%
1930	547	−5.9%
1950	406	−25.8%
1961	400	−1.5%
1970	365	−8.8%
1980	305	−16.4%
1991	246	−19.3%
2001	226	−8.1%
2011	189	−16.4%
2021	228	+20.6%
Source: Censuses
