= Malenovice Castle =

Coordinates: 49°12′12″N 17°35′59″E

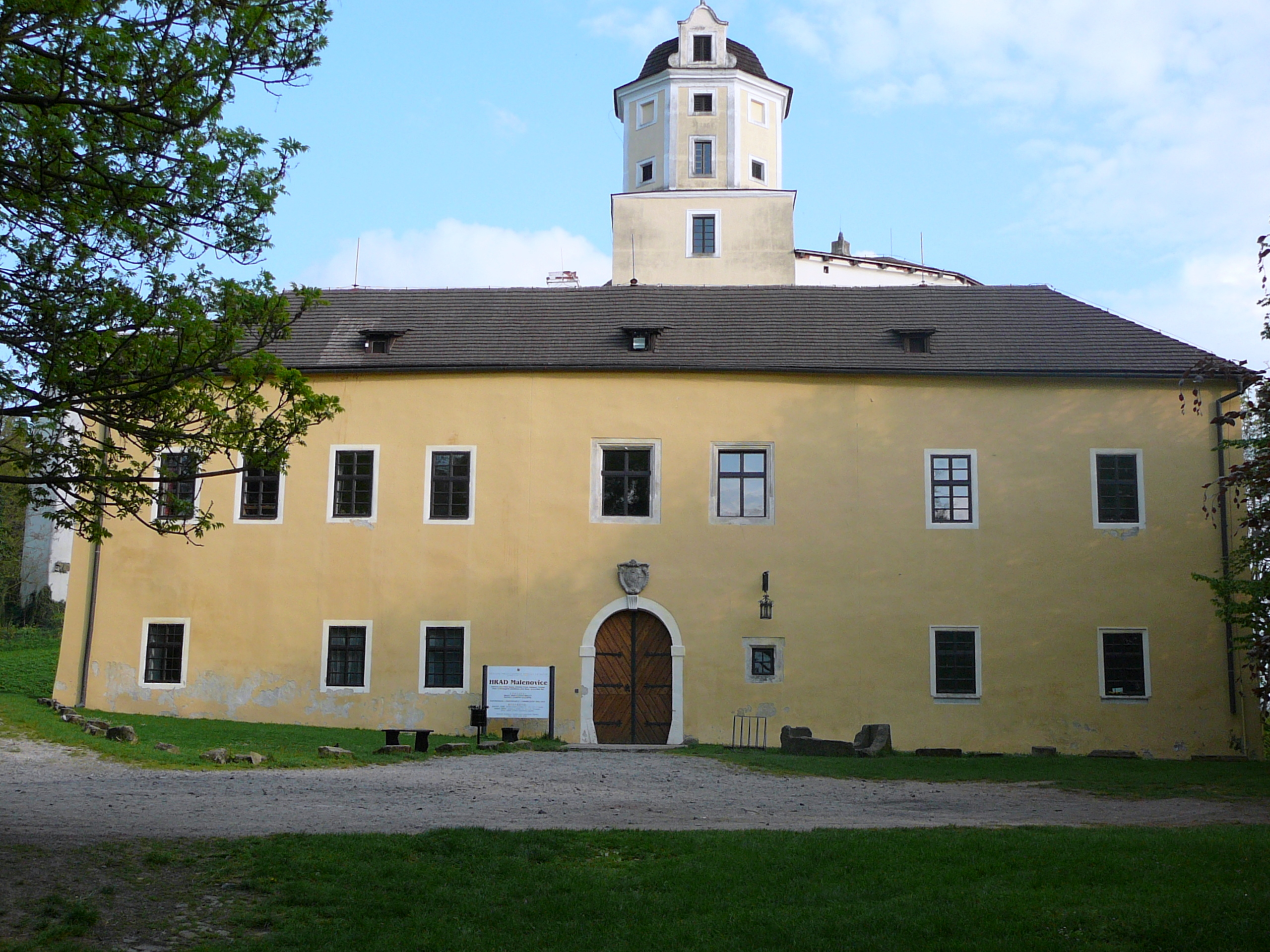
Malenovice Castle

Malenovice is a castle located in the Malenovice region of the city of Zlín in the Czech Republic. It was built in 1360.
