= Velký Ořechov =

- Municipality
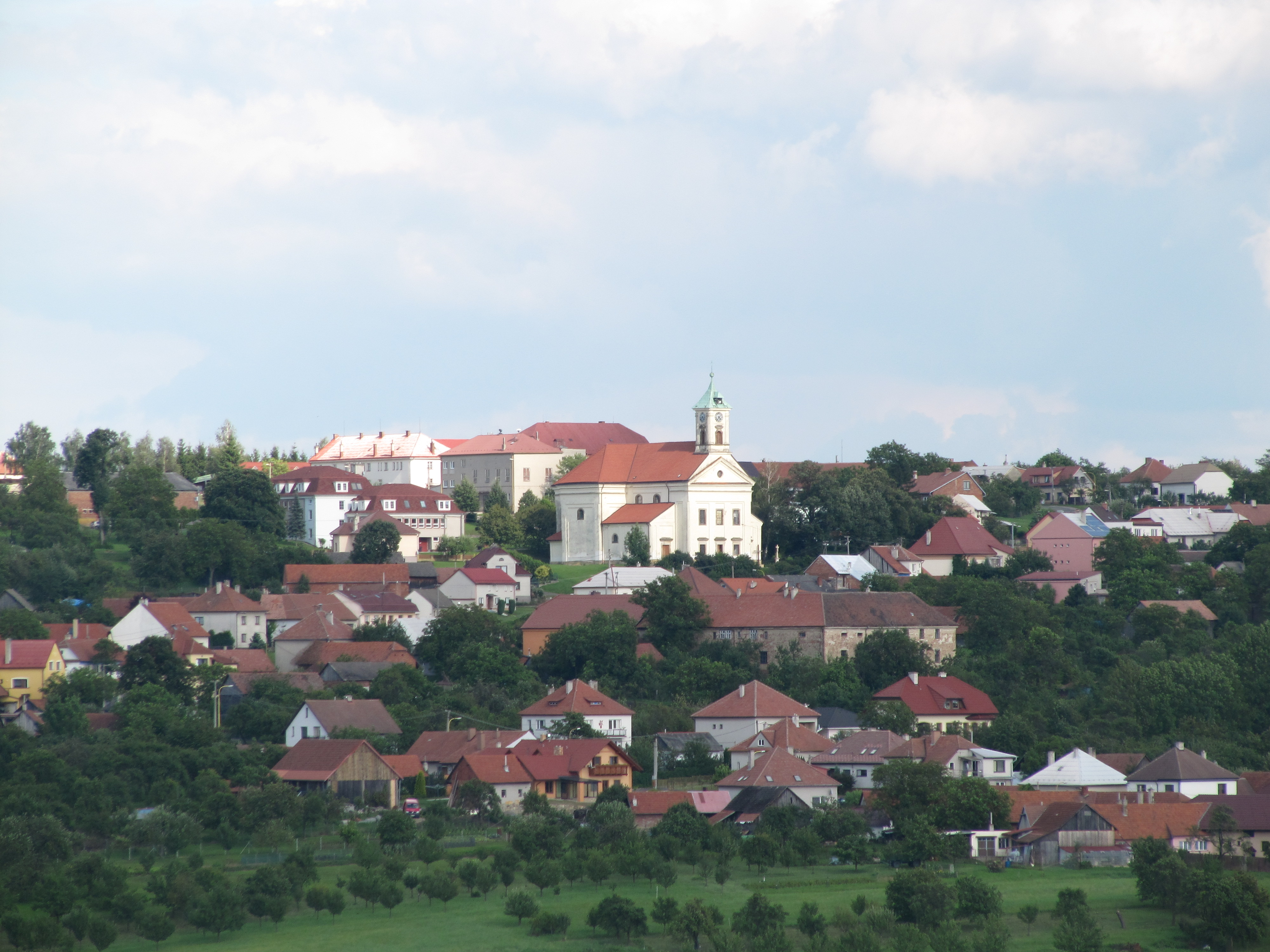
- General view

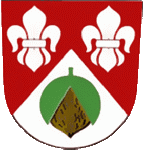
- Flag Coat of arms

- Location in the Czech Republic
- Coordinates: 49°6′34″N 17°40′6″E
- Country: Czech Republic
- Region: Zlín
- District: Zlín
- First mentioned: 1141

Area
  - Total: 6.21 km^{2} (2.40 sq mi)
- Elevation: 372 m (1,220 ft)

Population (2026-01-01)
  - Total: 715
  - Density: 115/km^{2} (298/sq mi)
- Time zone: UTC+1 (CET)
  - Summer (DST): UTC+2 (CEST)
- Postal code: 763 07
- Website: www.velkyorechov.cz

Velký Ořechov is a municipality and village in Zlín District in the Zlín Region of the Czech Republic. It has about 700 inhabitants.

Velký Ořechov lies approximately 14 kilometres (9 mi) south of Zlín and 258 km (160 mi) south-east of Prague.

== Demographics ==
Historical population
Year	Pop.	±%
1869	328	—
1880	354	+7.9%
1890	365	+3.1%
1900	486	+33.2%
1910	502	+3.3%
1921	514	+2.4%
1930	543	+5.6%
1950	599	+10.3%
1961	702	+17.2%
1970	672	−4.3%
1980	644	−4.2%
1991	652	+1.2%
2001	697	+6.9%
2011	746	+7.0%
2021	719	−3.6%
Source: Censuses
