= Střílky =

- Municipality
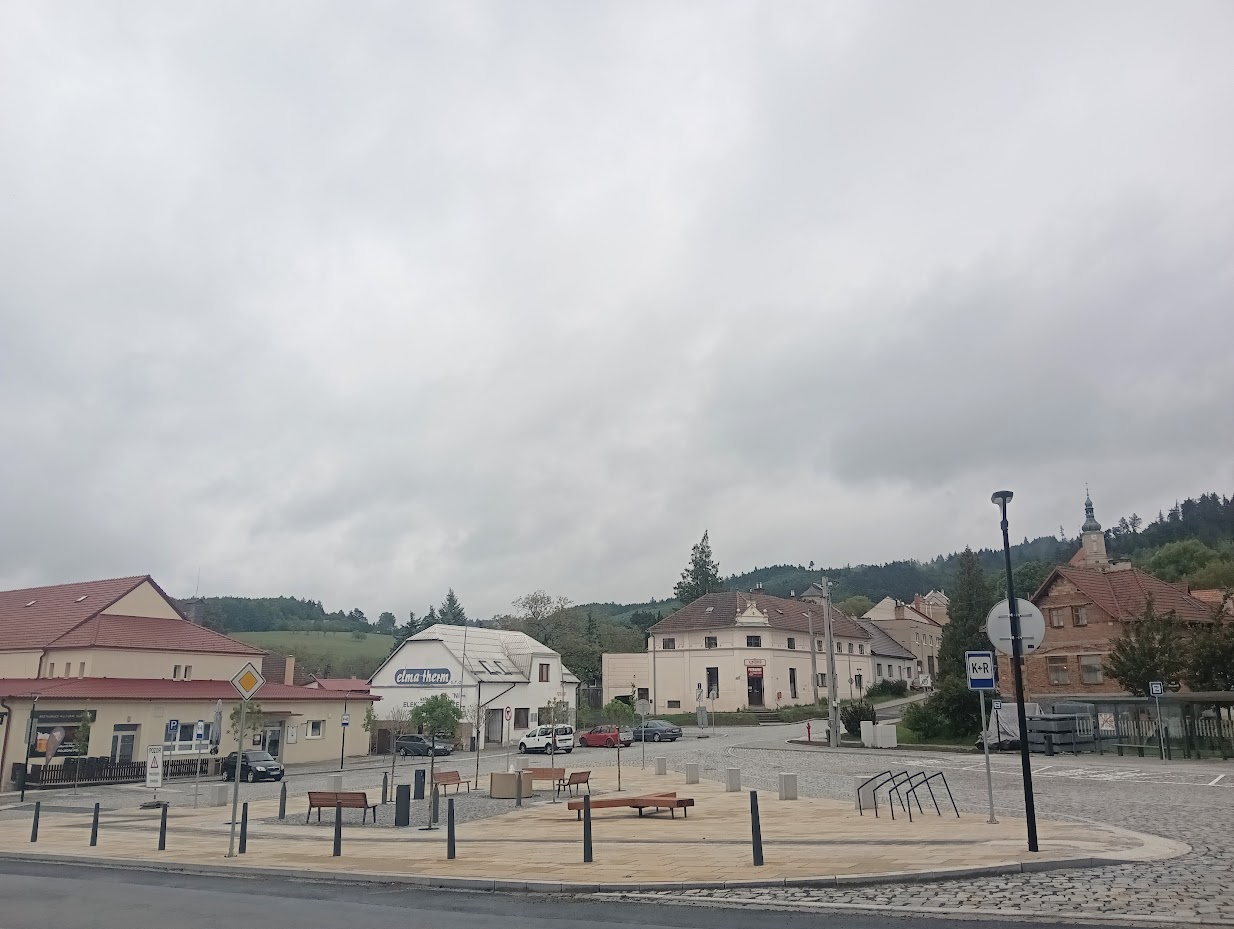
- Centre of Střílky

- Location in the Czech Republic
- Coordinates: 49°8′24″N 17°12′55″E
- Country: Czech Republic
- Region: Zlín
- District: Kroměříž
- First mentioned: 1261

Area
  - Total: 9.92 km^{2} (3.83 sq mi)
- Elevation: 337 m (1,106 ft)

Population (2026-01-01)
  - Total: 601
  - Density: 60.6/km^{2} (157/sq mi)
- Time zone: UTC+1 (CET)
  - Summer (DST): UTC+2 (CEST)
- Postal code: 768 04
- Website: www.obecstrilky.cz

Střílky is a municipality and village in Kroměříž District in the Zlín Region of the Czech Republic. It has about 600 inhabitants.

== Geography ==
Střílky is located about 21 kilometres (13 mi) southwest of Kroměříž and 41 km (25 mi) east of Brno. The northern part of the municipality lies in the Litenčice Hills and the southern part lies in a forested landscape of the Chřiby range. The highest point is the hill Hrad at 552 metres (1,811 ft) above sea level.

== History ==
The first written mention of Střílky is from 1261, when the local castle was documented. In 1321, Střílky was owned by Henry of Lipá. In 1486, a castle chapel was built. After 1486, the castle lost its significance and in 1542 it was already abandoned.

== Demographics ==
Historical population

| Year | Pop. | ±% |
|---|---|---|
| 1869 | 1,110 | — |
| 1880 | 1,114 | +0.4% |
| 1890 | 1,209 | +8.5% |
| 1900 | 1,191 | −1.5% |
| 1910 | 1,274 | +7.0% |

| Year | Pop. | ±% |
|---|---|---|
| 1921 | 1,150 | −9.7% |
| 1930 | 1,000 | −13.0% |
| 1950 | 1,008 | +0.8% |
| 1961 | 926 | −8.1% |
| 1970 | 796 | −14.0% |

| Year | Pop. | ±% |
|---|---|---|
| 1980 | 771 | −3.1% |
| 1991 | 726 | −5.8% |
| 2001 | 685 | −5.6% |
| 2011 | 687 | +0.3% |
| 2021 | 595 | −13.4% |

Source: Censuses

== Transport ==
The I/50 road (part of the European route E50) from Brno to Uherské Hradiště runs through the municipality.

== Sights ==
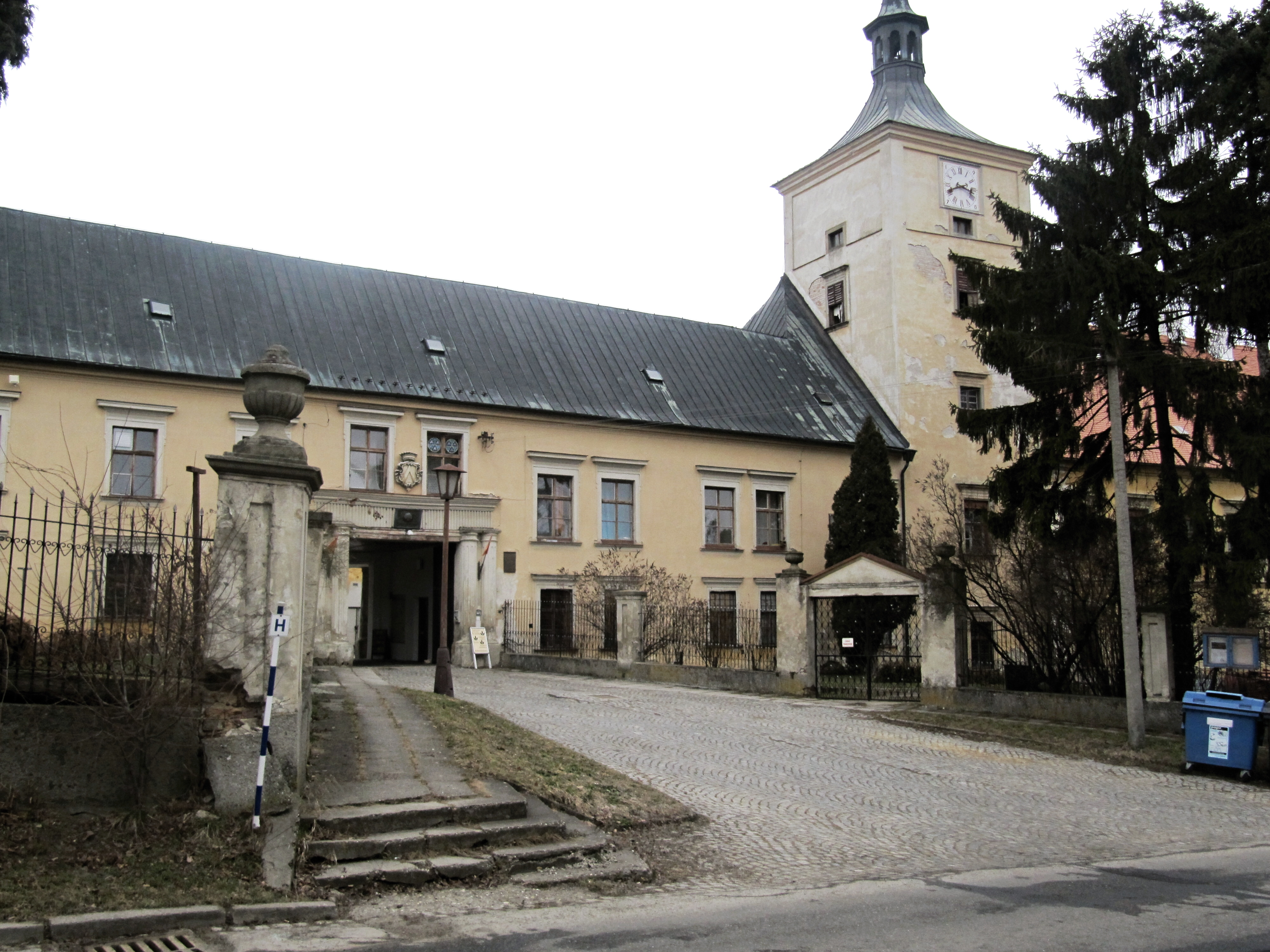
Baroque castle

The Střílky Castle is a ruin of a Gothic castle from the second half of the 13th century. It is located on the Hrad hill southeast of the village. Only several fragments (the castle core, the torso of the round tower, ramparts and ditches) are preserved to this day.

A fortress was built in Střílky in the 16th century. In the 17th century it was rebuilt to a representative Baroque residence, and in the 18th century it was further extended. It includes a castle park. Today the castle complex is privately owned.
