= Nezdenice =

- Municipality
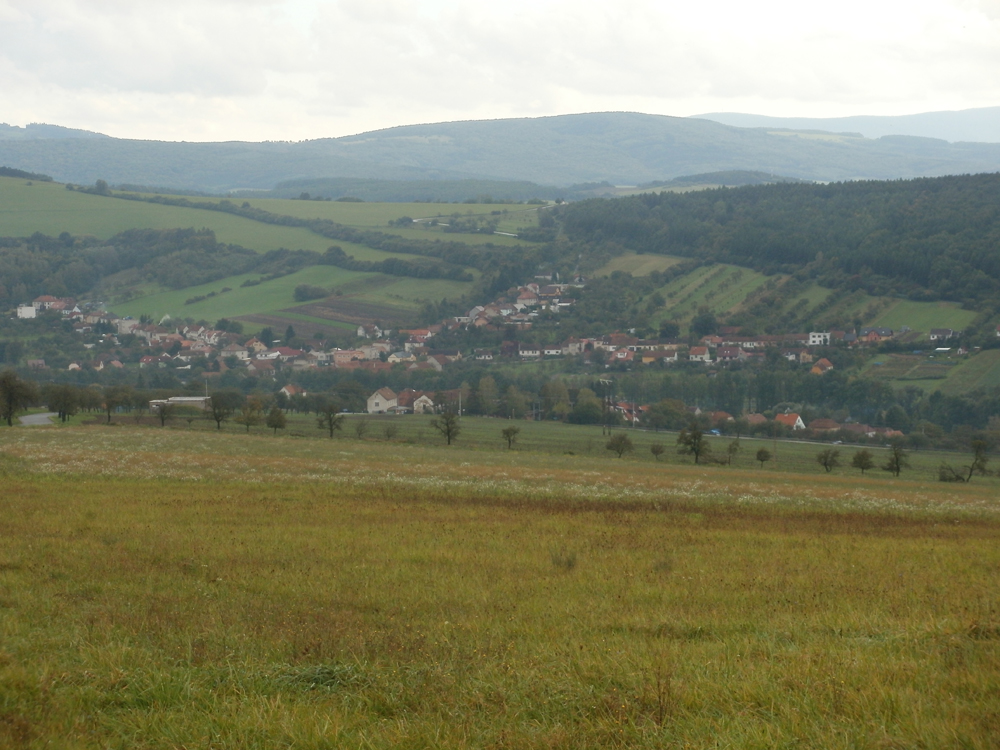
- General view

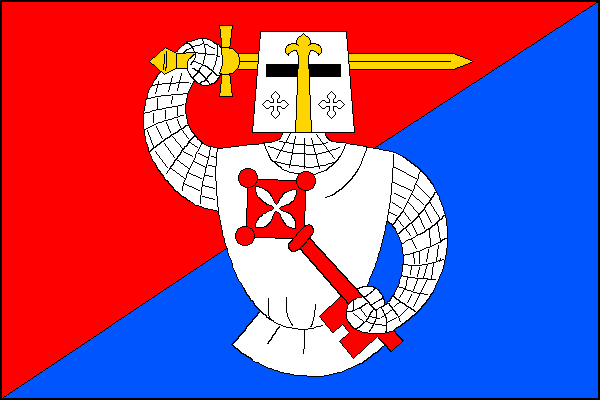
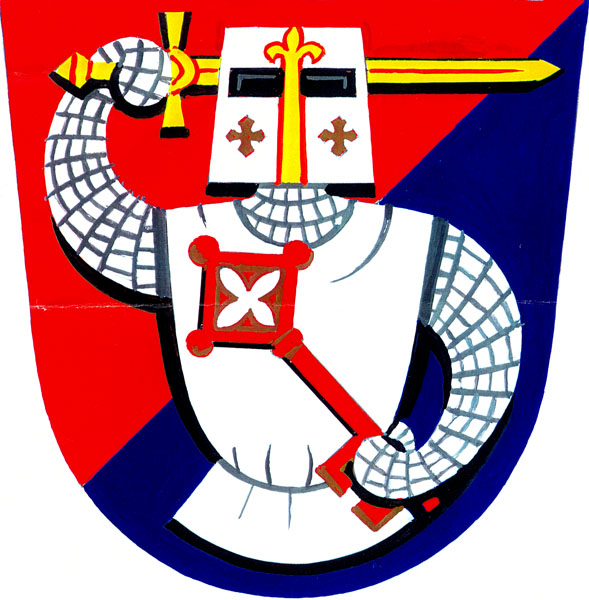
- Flag Coat of arms

- Location in the Czech Republic
- Coordinates: 49°1′0″N 17°45′8″E
- Country: Czech Republic
- Region: Zlín
- District: Uherské Hradiště
- First mentioned: 1374

Area
  - Total: 8.35 km^{2} (3.22 sq mi)
- Elevation: 245 m (804 ft)

Population (2026-01-01)
  - Total: 708
  - Density: 84.8/km^{2} (220/sq mi)
- Time zone: UTC+1 (CET)
  - Summer (DST): UTC+2 (CEST)
- Postal code: 687 32
- Website: www.nezdenice.cz

Nezdenice is a municipality and village in Uherské Hradiště District in the Zlín Region of the Czech Republic. It has about 700 inhabitants.

Nezdenice lies approximately 23 kilometres (14 mi) east of Uherské Hradiště, 25 km (16 mi) south of Zlín, and 269 km (167 mi) south-east of Prague.

== History ==
The first written mention of Nezdenice is from 1374.

== Demographics ==
Historical population
| Year | Pop. | ±% |
|---|---|---|
| 1869 | 494 | — |
| 1880 | 533 | +7.9% |
| 1890 | 555 | +4.1% |
| 1900 | 628 | +13.2% |
| 1910 | 631 | +0.5% |
| 1921 | 643 | +1.9% |
| 1930 | 698 | +8.6% |
| 1950 | 650 | −6.9% |
| 1961 | 756 | +16.3% |
| 1970 | 729 | −3.6% |
| 1980 | 731 | +0.3% |
| 1991 | 765 | +4.7% |
| 2001 | 758 | −0.9% |
| 2011 | 764 | +0.8% |
| 2021 | 760 | −0.5% |
Source: Censuses
