= Podhradí (Zlín District) =

- Municipality
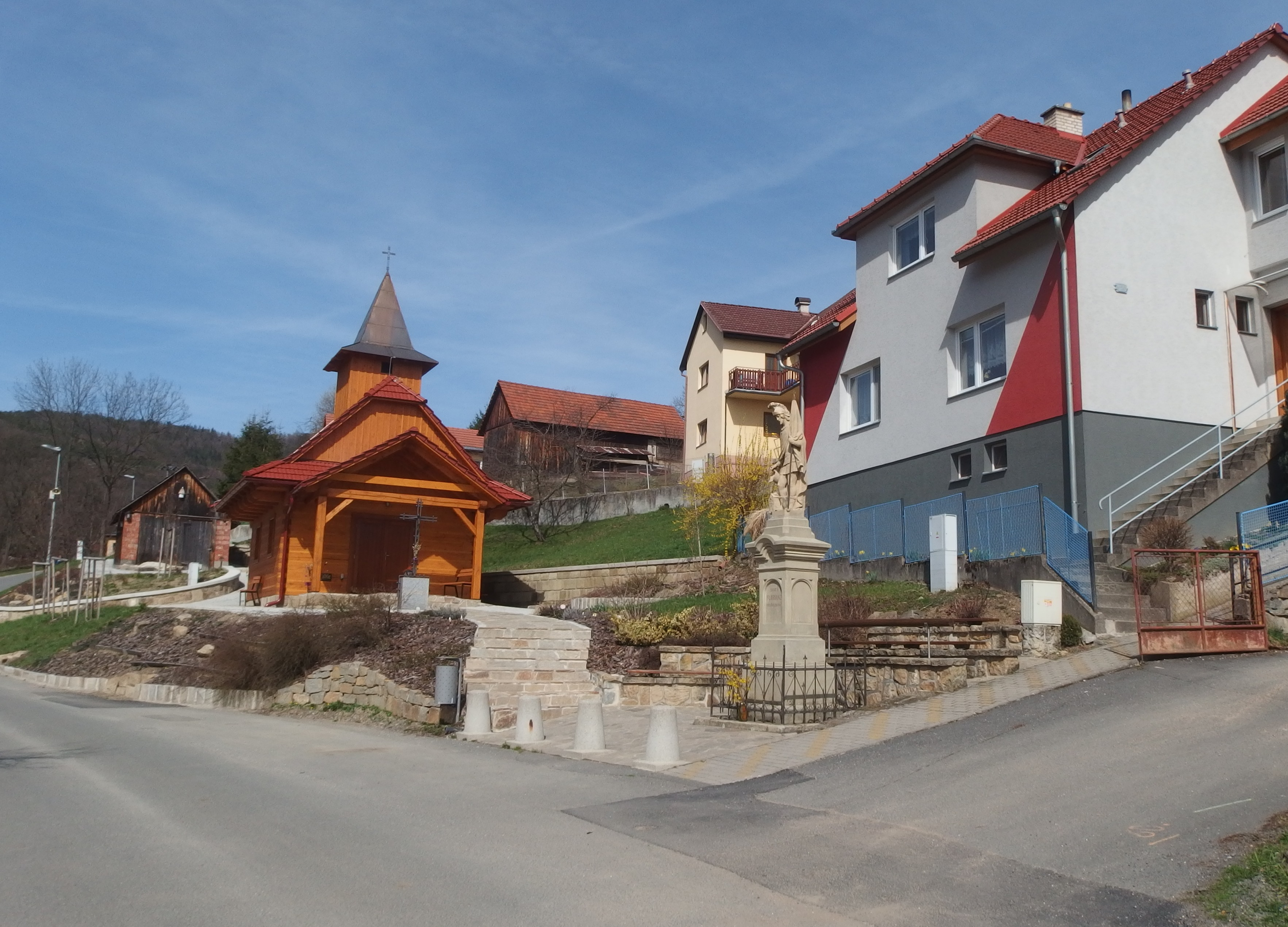
- Centre of Podhradí

- Flag Coat of arms

- Location in the Czech Republic
- Coordinates: 49°8′24″N 17°46′26″E
- Country: Czech Republic
- Region: Zlín
- District: Zlín
- First mentioned: 1563

Area
  - Total: 3.48 km^{2} (1.34 sq mi)
- Elevation: 354 m (1,161 ft)

Population (2026-01-01)
  - Total: 205
  - Density: 58.9/km^{2} (153/sq mi)
- Time zone: UTC+1 (CET)
  - Summer (DST): UTC+2 (CEST)
- Postal code: 763 26
- Website: www.obec-podhradi.cz

Podhradí is a municipality and village in Zlín District in the Zlín Region of the Czech Republic. It has about 200 inhabitants.

Podhradí lies approximately 13 kilometres (8 mi) south-east of Zlín and 264 km (164 mi) south-east of Prague.

== Demographics ==
Historical population
Year	Pop.	±%
1869	228	—
1880	260	+14.0%
1890	263	+1.2%
1900	262	−0.4%
1910	278	+6.1%
1921	269	−3.2%
1930	246	−8.6%
1950	228	−7.3%
1961	255	+11.8%
1970	244	−4.3%
1980	207	−15.2%
1991	185	−10.6%
2001	198	+7.0%
2011	200	+1.0%
2021	193	−3.5%
Source: Censuses
