= Žeranovice =

- Municipality
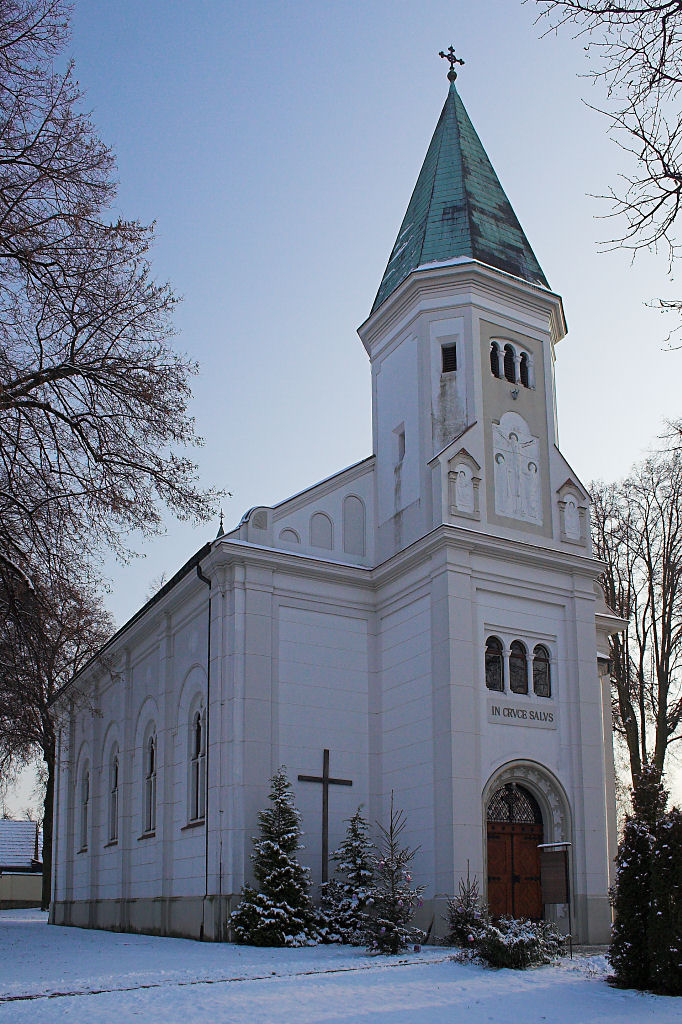
- Church of Saint Lawrence

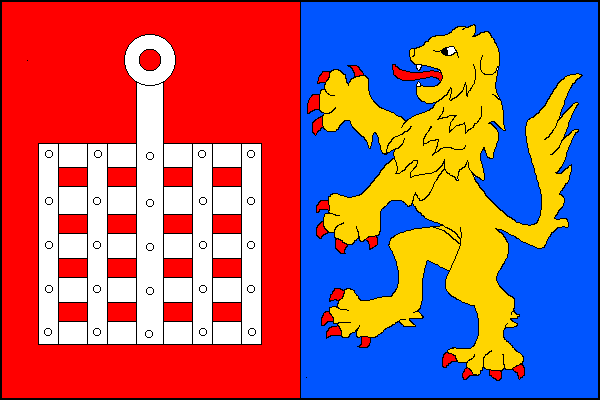
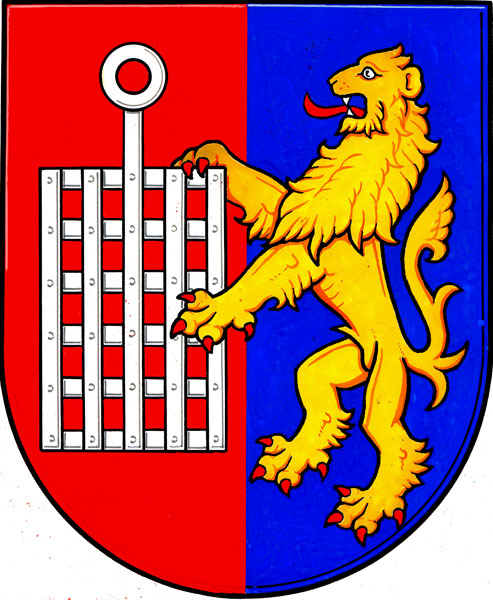
- Flag Coat of arms

- Location in the Czech Republic
- Coordinates: 49°17′29″N 17°36′16″E
- Country: Czech Republic
- Region: Zlín
- District: Kroměříž
- First mentioned: 1297

Area
  - Total: 5.38 km^{2} (2.08 sq mi)
- Elevation: 244 m (801 ft)

Population (2026-01-01)
  - Total: 793
  - Density: 147/km^{2} (382/sq mi)
- Time zone: UTC+1 (CET)
  - Summer (DST): UTC+2 (CEST)
- Postal code: 769 01
- Website: www.zeranovice.cz

Žeranovice is a municipality and village in Kroměříž District in the Zlín Region of the Czech Republic. It has about 800 inhabitants.

Žeranovice lies approximately 16 kilometres (10 mi) east of Kroměříž, 8 km (5 mi) north-west of Zlín, and 246 km (153 mi) east of Prague.

== Demographics ==
Historical population
| Year | Pop. | ±% |
|---|---|---|
| 1869 | 815 | — |
| 1880 | 608 | −25.4% |
| 1890 | 601 | −1.2% |
| 1900 | 653 | +8.7% |
| 1910 | 651 | −0.3% |
| 1921 | 631 | −3.1% |
| 1930 | 664 | +5.2% |
| 1950 | 636 | −4.2% |
| 1961 | 763 | +20.0% |
| 1970 | 749 | −1.8% |
| 1980 | 687 | −8.3% |
| 1991 | 676 | −1.6% |
| 2001 | 748 | +10.7% |
| 2011 | 730 | −2.4% |
| 2021 | 800 | +9.6% |
Source: Censuses
