= Miklušovce =

- Municipality
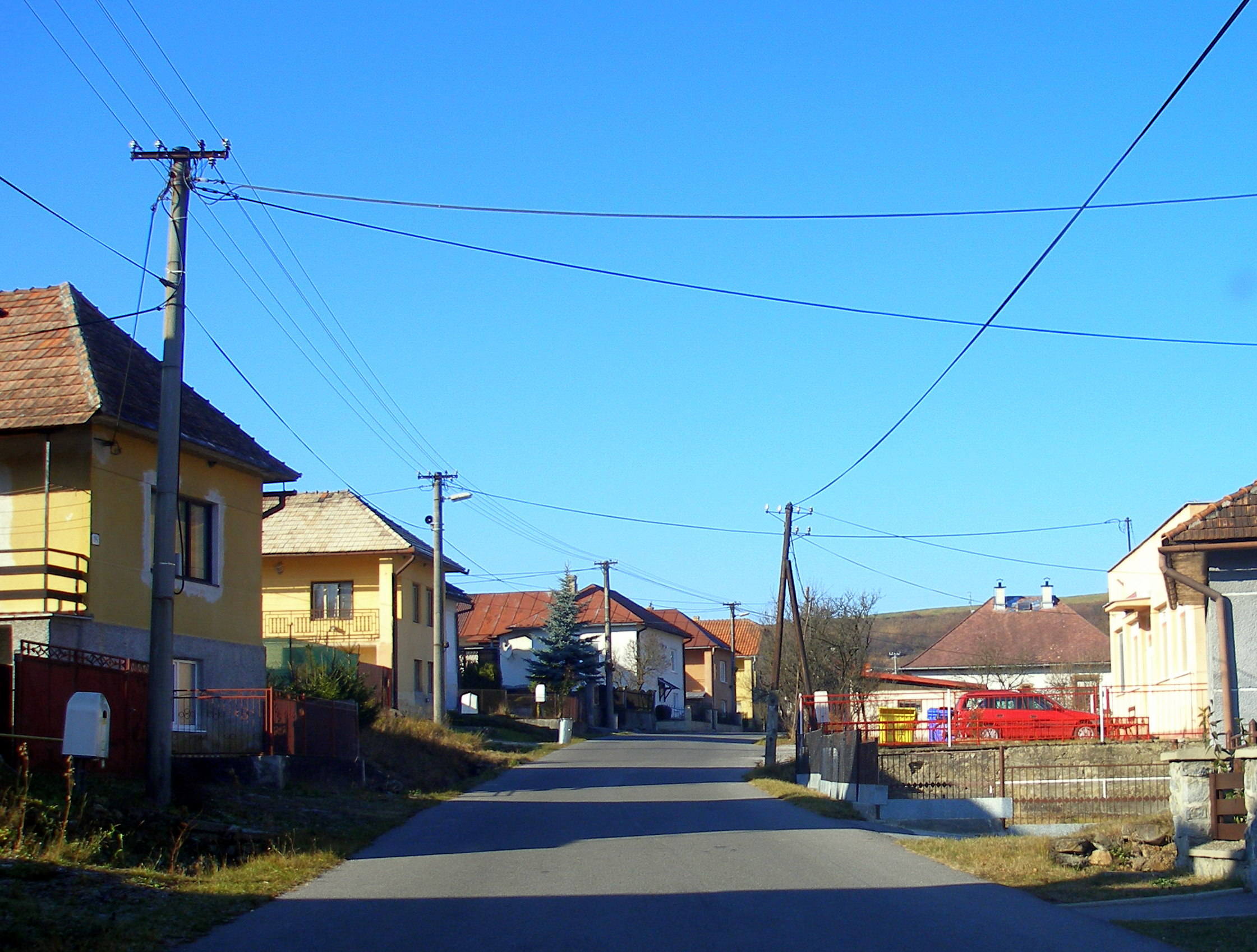

- Flag

- Location of Miklušovce in the Prešov Region Location of Miklušovce in Slovakia
- Coordinates: 48.92°N 21.08°E
- Country: Slovakia
- Region: Prešov Region
- District: Prešov District
- First mentioned: 1330

Area
  - Total: 7.22 km^{2} (2.79 sq mi)
- Elevation: 473 m (1,552 ft)

Population (2025)
  - Total: 280
- Time zone: UTC+1 (CET)
  - Summer (DST): UTC+2 (CEST)
- Postal code: 824 4
- Area code: +421 51
- Vehicle registration plate (until 2022): PO
- Website: www.miklusovce.sk

Miklušovce (Hungarian: Miklósvágása) is a village and municipality in Prešov District in the Prešov Region of eastern Slovakia.

== History ==
In historical records the village was first mentioned in 1330.

== Geography ==
The municipality lies at an altitude of 473 metres (1,552 ft) and covers an area of 7.22 km^{2} (2.79 sq mi) (2025).

== Population ==
Population statistic (10 years)
Year	1995	2005	2015	2025
Count	334	343	316	280
Difference		+2.69%	−7.87%	−11.39%

Population statistic
Year	2024	2025
Count	289	280
Difference		−3.11%

It has a population of 280 people (31 December 2025).

=== Ethnicity ===
Census 2021 (1+ %)
Ethnicity	Number	Fraction
Slovak	300	98.36%
Not found out	6	1.96%
Total	305	

In year 2021 was 305 people by ethnicity 300 as Slovak, 6 as Not found out, 2 as Ukrainian, 2 as Rusyn, 1 as Italian, 1 as Hungarian and 1 as Other.

Note on population: The difference values of population numbers in the table "Population statistic" and in the sections "Ethnicity" & "Religion" is caused by the use of various statistical methods.

=== Religion ===
Census 2021 (1+ %)
Religion	Number	Fraction
Greek Catholic Church	219	71.8%
Roman Catholic Church	64	20.98%
None	13	4.26%
Total	305	

In year 2021 was 305 people by religion 219 from Greek Catholic Church, 64 from Roman Catholic Church, 13 from None, 2 from Eastern Orthodox Church, 2 from Not found out, 2 from Other, 2 from Evangelical Church and 1 from Ad hoc movements.
