= Loučka (Zlín District) =

- Municipality
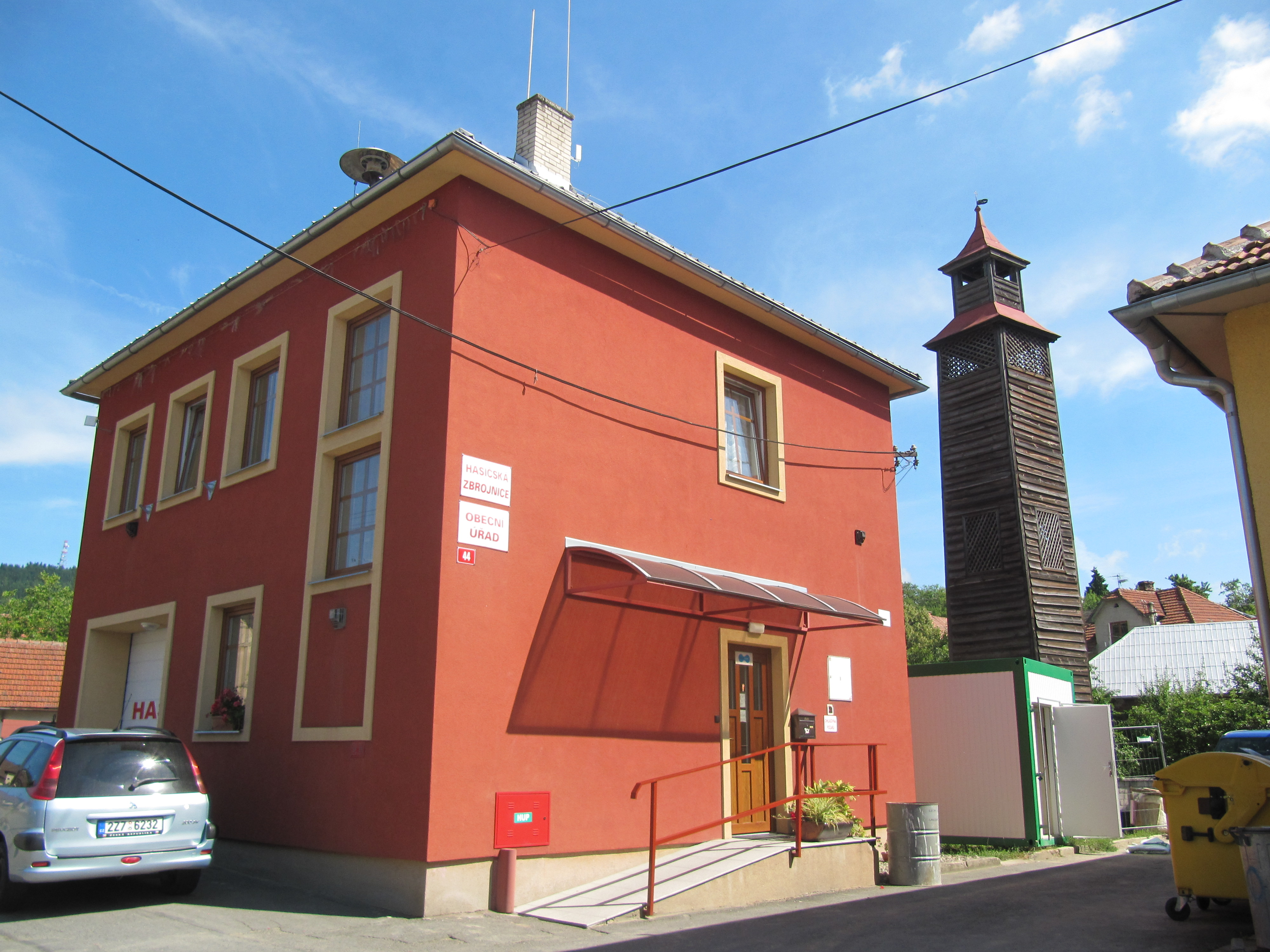
- Municipal office

- Flag Coat of arms

- Location in the Czech Republic
- Coordinates: 49°10′12″N 17°52′34″E
- Country: Czech Republic
- Region: Zlín
- District: Zlín
- First mentioned: 1261

Area
  - Total: 7.59 km^{2} (2.93 sq mi)
- Elevation: 438 m (1,437 ft)

Population (2026-01-01)
  - Total: 413
  - Density: 54.4/km^{2} (141/sq mi)
- Time zone: UTC+1 (CET)
  - Summer (DST): UTC+2 (CEST)
- Postal code: 763 25
- Website: loucka-obec.cz

Loučka is a municipality and village in Zlín District in the Zlín Region of the Czech Republic. It has about 400 inhabitants.

Loučka lies approximately 18 kilometres (11 mi) south-east of Zlín and 270 km (170 mi) south-east of Prague.

== Demographics ==
Historical population
Year	Pop.	±%
1869	440	—
1880	449	+2.0%
1890	434	−3.3%
1900	443	+2.1%
1910	435	−1.8%
1921	419	−3.7%
1930	431	+2.9%
1950	426	−1.2%
1961	455	+6.8%
1970	413	−9.2%
1980	398	−3.6%
1991	364	−8.5%
2001	483	+32.7%
2011	475	−1.7%
2021	495	+4.2%
Source: Censuses
