= Kurovice Castle =

Coordinates: 49°17′18.27″N 17°31′0.61″E

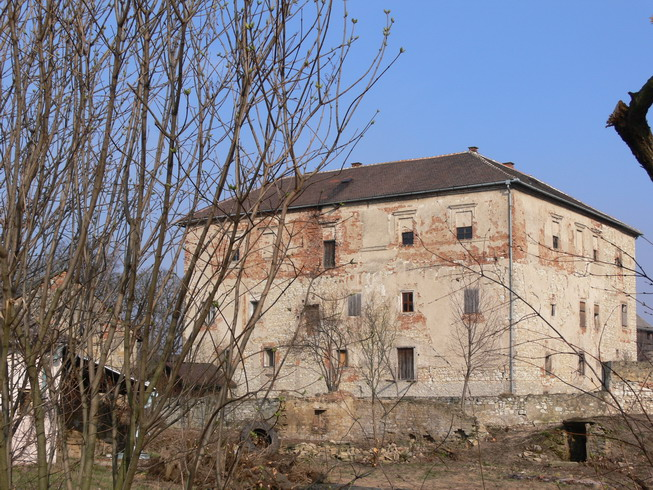
Kurovice Castle

Kurovice Castle, also called Kurowitz Castle, is located in Kurovice, in the Kroměříž District, Zlín Region, Czech Republic. It is one of the most important extant fortresses of the lower nobility in the Czech Republic.

The first buildings, in the 13th century, were probably mostly from wood. The oldest surviving walls are from the first half of the 15th century. The castle measures 30 by 20 metres (98 by 66 ft), and there were 3 levels tower and one level palace first. The buildings were protected by a double protective wall, with a wooden bridge over two moats, in place until the 20th century.

The main rebuildings were made by the noble Vrchlabsky family, between 1590 and the mid-16th century. Most of the architectural details from this period survive unchanged. One of the builders was Joachym Zoubek ze Zdetina (Joachym Zub ze Zdietina), who began work in the second half of the 16th century. His coat is still found in the top of one ceiling vault, with the text "JOACHIM ZVB ZE ZDIETINA A NA MOSSTIENICI KOMORNIK MENSSI ETC." The last meaningful reconstruction was made by Vaclav Eusebius Lobkowicz, who finished the 3rd floor of the building. In the 20th century, the castle was used as a block of flats. A restoration began in 1982, but was halted in 1990. As of 2006, the castle belongs to a private owner.
