= Věžky (Kroměříž District) =

- Municipality
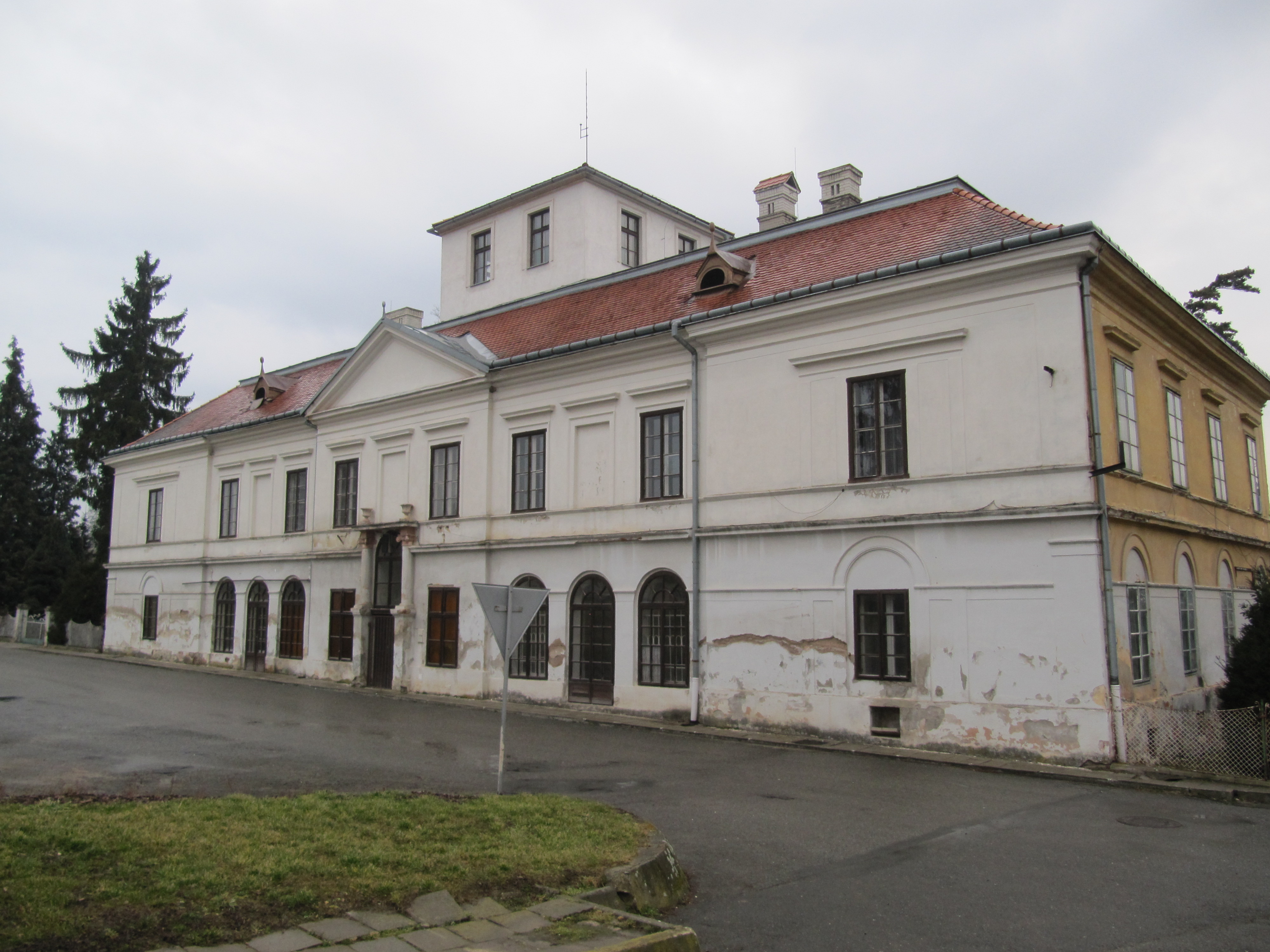
- Věžky Castle

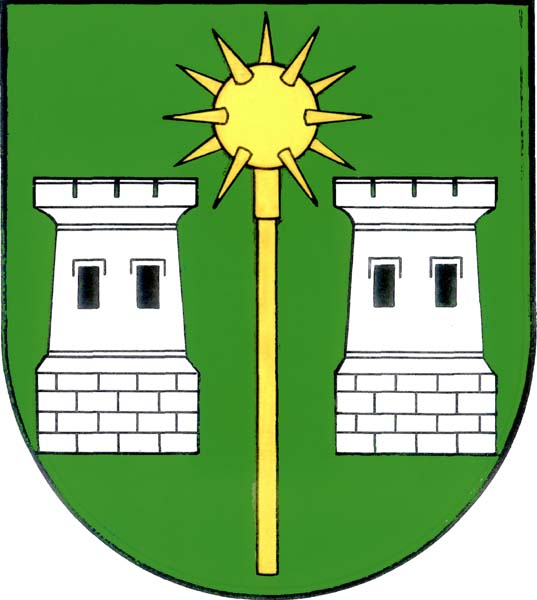
- Flag Coat of arms

- Location in the Czech Republic
- Coordinates: 49°17′6″N 17°16′53″E
- Country: Czech Republic
- Region: Zlín
- District: Kroměříž
- First mentioned: 1348

Area
  - Total: 8.27 km^{2} (3.19 sq mi)
- Elevation: 277 m (909 ft)

Population (2026-01-01)
  - Total: 449
  - Density: 54.3/km^{2} (141/sq mi)
- Time zone: UTC+1 (CET)
  - Summer (DST): UTC+2 (CEST)
- Postal code: 768 33
- Website: www.obecvezky.cz

Věžky is a municipality and village in Kroměříž District in the Zlín Region of the Czech Republic. It has about 400 inhabitants.

Věžky lies approximately 9 kilometres (6 mi) west of Kroměříž, 29 km (18 mi) west of Zlín, and 225 km (140 mi) south-east of Prague.

== Administrative division ==
Věžky consists of two municipal parts (in brackets population according to the 2021 census):

- Věžky (333)
- Vlčí Doly (73)

== Demographics ==
Historical population
Year	Pop.	±%
1869	558	—
1880	547	−2.0%
1890	585	+6.9%
1900	618	+5.6%
1910	663	+7.3%
1921	658	−0.8%
1930	669	+1.7%
1950	536	−19.9%
1961	577	+7.6%
1970	507	−12.1%
1980	438	−13.6%
1991	347	−20.8%
2001	346	−0.3%
2011	385	+11.3%
2021	406	+5.5%
Source: Censuses
