= Klenov =

- Municipality
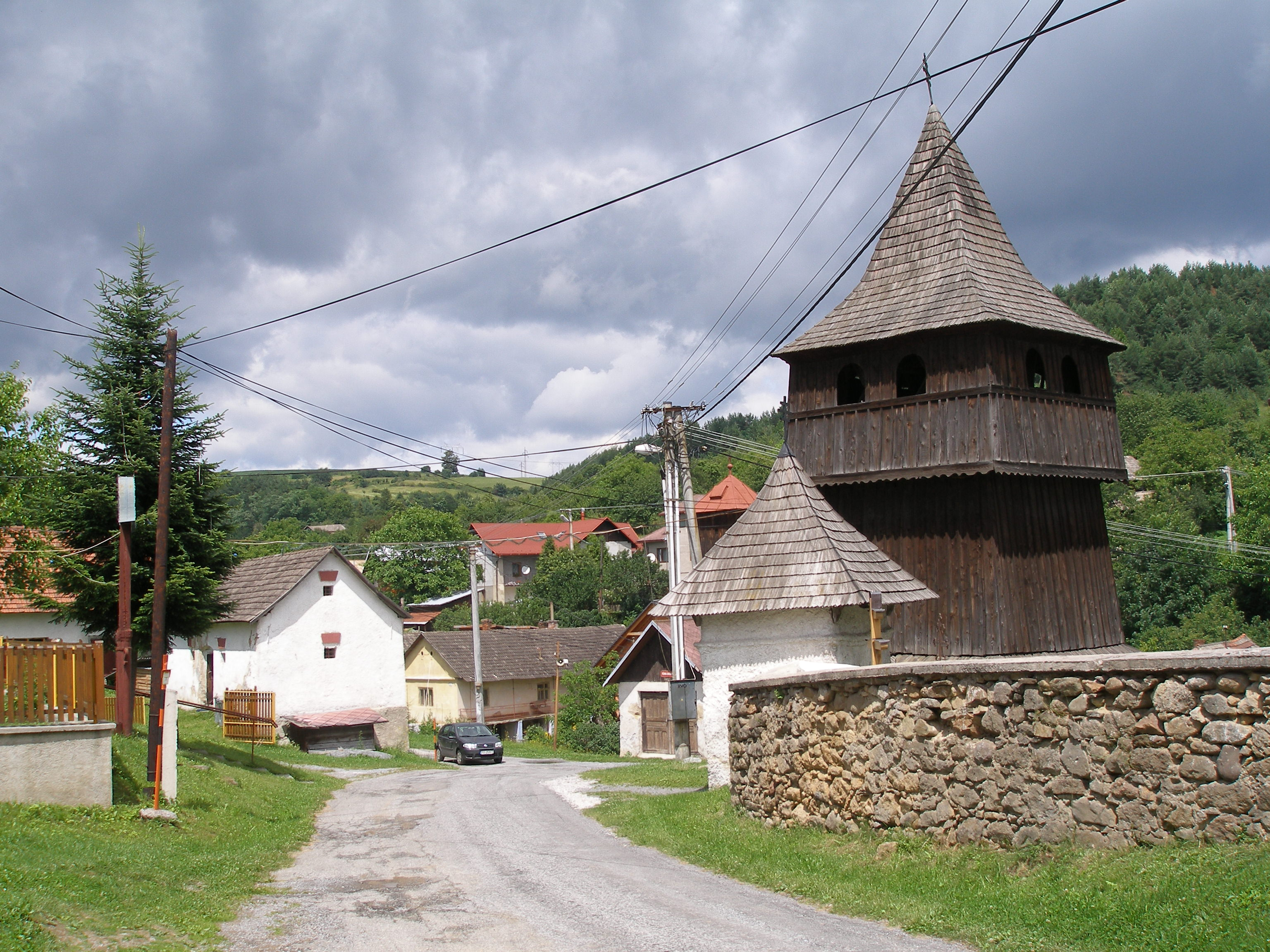

- Flag Coat of arms

- Location of Klenov in the Prešov Region Location of Klenov in Slovakia
- Coordinates: 48°55′43″N 21°03′20″E
- Country: Slovakia
- Region: Prešov Region
- District: Prešov District
- First mentioned: 1330

Area
  - Total: 15.36 km^{2} (5.93 sq mi)
- Elevation: 560 m (1,840 ft)

Population (2025)
  - Total: 228
- Time zone: UTC+1 (CET)
  - Summer (DST): UTC+2 (CEST)
- Postal code: 824 4
- Area code: +421 51
- Vehicle registration plate (until 2022): PO
- Website: www.klenov.sk

Klenov (Hungarian: Kelembér) is a village and municipality situated in Prešov District in the Prešov Region of eastern Slovakia.

== History ==
In historical records the village was first mentioned in 1330.

== Geography ==
The municipality lies at an altitude of 560 metres (1,840 ft) and covers an area of 15.36 km^{2} (5.93 sq mi) (2025).

== Population ==
Population statistic (10 years)
Year	1995	2005	2015	2025
Count	242	206	232	228
Difference		−14.87%	+12.62%	−1.72%

Population statistic
Year	2024	2025
Count	231	228
Difference		−1.29%

It has a population of 228 people (31 December 2025).

=== Ethnicity ===
Census 2021 (1+ %)
Ethnicity	Number	Fraction
Slovak	231	96.65%
Not found out	6	2.51%
Total	239	

In year 2021 was 239 people by ethnicity 231 as Slovak, 6 as Not found out, 2 as Czech, 2 as Polish and 1 as Other.

Note on population: The difference values of population numbers in the table "Population statistic" and in the sections "Ethnicity" & "Religion" is caused by the use of various statistical methods.

=== Religion ===
Census 2021 (1+ %)
Religion	Number	Fraction
Greek Catholic Church	122	51.05%
Roman Catholic Church	81	33.89%
None	19	7.95%
Evangelical Church	7	2.93%
Not found out	4	1.67%
Paganism and natural spirituality	3	1.26%
Total	239	

In year 2021 was 239 people by religion 122 from Greek Catholic Church, 81 from Roman Catholic Church, 19 from None, 7 from Evangelical Church, 4 from Not found out, 3 from Paganism and natural spirituality, 2 from Seventh-day Adventist Church and 1 from Apostolic Church.

== Genealogical resources ==
The records for genealogical research are available at the state archive "Statny Archiv in Presov, Slovakia"

- Roman Catholic church records (births/marriages/deaths): 1785–1918 (parish B)
- Greek Catholic church records (births/marriages/deaths): 1825–1898 (parish A)

== See also ==
- List of municipalities and towns in Slovakia
