= Josef Ježek =

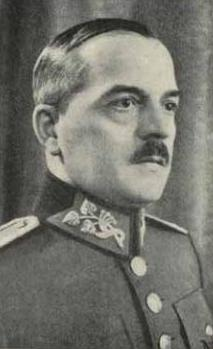
- Josef Ježek 1939

Minister of the Interior of the Protectorate of Bohemia and Moravia
- In office 1 July 1939 – 19 January 1942
- President: Emil Hácha
- Preceded by: Alois Eliáš
- Succeeded by: Richard Bienert

Personal details
- Born: 2 August 1884 Žamberk, Austria-Hungary
- Died: 10 May 1969 (aged 84) Prague, Czechoslovakia
- Party: National Partnership

Josef Ježek (2 August 1884 – 10 May 1969) was a Czech General of Gendarmerie, Politician and the Minister of the Interior in the government of the Protectorate of Bohemia and Moravia during the Nazi occupation of Czechoslovakia.

== Early life and education ==
Josef Ježek was born to František and Josefa Ježek in Žamberk, Austria-Hungary, a town currently located in the Pardubice Region of the Czech Republic. His father, František, was an educator who founded the town school in Senftenberg. He completed his early education and some high school when he enrolled in cadet school in Vienna. After graduation he was assigned to the 22nd Home Guard Infantry Regiment in Chernivtsi. He ended his army service with the rank of lieutenant.

== Police career ==
In 1909 Ježek joined the government police, where he served on the Provincial Gendarmerie Command No. 13 in Chernivtsi. The following year passed the professional exam and became commander of the gendarme department in Vyzhnytsia. A few months later he was appointed adjutant commander in Chernivtsi. In 1913 he was promoted to the rank of captain and two years later in 1915 he was transferred to the police headquarters in Vienna, where he was assigned as commander of the department in Sankt Pölten. In 1918, after the establishment of independent Czechoslovakia, he became the commander of the police department in Jindřichův Hradec. In 1919 he was sent to Bratislava, where he became as adjutant provincial police commander. Several years later he was promoted to General Commander of the Police.

== Political career ==
On 16 March 1939 Adolf Hitler established the Protectorate of Bohemia and Moravia after the German occupation of Czechoslovakia the previous day. In July 1939 Prime Minister Alois Eliáš appointed Ježek the Interior Minister of the Protectorate of Bohemia and Moravia government. Soon after his appointment Ježek was summoned to Berlin where he was informed by Heinrich Himmler that Germany would do whatever was necessary to have the Czech people conform to the new regime. His sentiment often opposes the occupation officials and although he could not openly join the resistance, he supported it. In January 1942 Ježek was relieved of his duties as the Interior Minister for refusing to swear an oath of loyalty. After the war, in 1945 and again in 1947, Ježek was arrested for his activities for the Protectorate but was acquitted of the charges and set free. In 1954 the Communist regime tried him for espionage and treason and sentenced him 25 years. He was released early in 1960.

== Personal life ==
In the 1910 Ježek married Olga Semak, a local noblewoman, daughter of Eugene Semak. In 1913 they had a daughter. Ježek died in Prague on 10 May 1969. He is buried in the Olšany Cemetery in Prague.

== See also ==
- Jaroslav Eminger
