= Jaroslav Krejčí (sociologist) =

Czech-British politician and sociologist

Jaroslav Krejčí (13 February 1916 – 16 February 2014) was a Czech-British sociologist, historian, economist and former professor of sociology at Lancaster University.

Krejčí was born on 13 February 1916 in Polešovice, Austria-Hungary (the present-day Czech Republic). He studied law.

Krejčí's father, Jaroslav Krejčí, held office as the Prime Minister of the German-occupied Protectorate of Bohemia and Moravia from 1942 to 1945. In contrast to his father's collaboration, Jaroslav Krejčí opposed the German occupation of Czechoslovakia and became actively involved in the Czech resistance during World War II.

Krejčí joined the Josef Hlavka National Economic Institute after the end of the war. He openly opposed the merger of the Czechoslovak Social Democratic Party, to which he was a member, into Communist Party of Czechoslovakia following the 1948 Czechoslovak coup d'état. In 1954, he was sentenced to ten years in prison on charges of treason for his opposition to the Communist Party.

He was released from prison in 1960 as part of an amnesty. He and his wife immigrated to the United Kingdom following the Warsaw Pact invasion of Czechoslovakia in 1968, which had crushed the Prague Spring. Krejčí became a professor of sociology at Lancaster University. He taught in the university's Departments of French Studies, German Studies and Religious Studies from 1969 until 1983. Much of his research focused on history and the formation of civilization from a macrosociological approach. He returned to Czechoslovakia and the Czech Republic following the fall of communism to teach at Charles University in Prague and Palacký University, Olomouc, as well as the Diplomatic Academy of Vienna.

He founded the Anna and Jaroslav Krejčí Research Endowment Fund in 2006 to support individuals engaged in the humanities.

In 1998, President Václav Havel awarded Krejčí the Medal of Merit. Lancaster University also honored him with an honorary doctorate in 2000.

Jaroslav Krejčí died in Lancaster, Lancashire, United Kingdom, on 16 February 2014 at the age of 98.

== Publications ==
- The Human Predicament: It's Changing Image A Study in Comparative Religion and History (1993) ISBN 978-0-312-09101-9
- Czechoslovakia, 1918-92: A Laboratory for Social Change (1996) ISBN 978-1-349-39183-7
- The Paths of Civilization (2004) ISBN 978-1-4039-1760-7
