= Richard Bienert =

Czech police officer and politician (1881–1949)

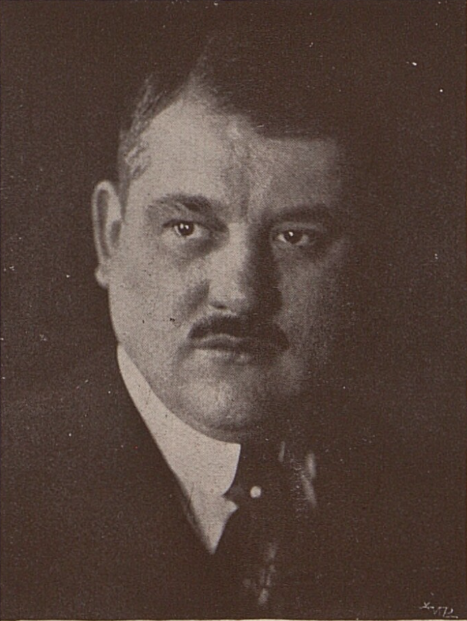

Prime Minister of Protectorate of Bohemia and Moravia
- In office 19 January 1945 – 5 May 1945
- President: Emil Hácha
- Preceded by: Jaroslav Krejčí
- Succeeded by: Office Abolished (Zdeněk Fierlinger as Prime Minister of Czechoslovakia)

Personal details
- Born: September 5, 1881 Prague, Austria-Hungary
- Died: February 2, 1949 (aged 67) Prague, Czechoslovakia
- Education: Prague University

Richard Bienert (September 5, 1881 – February 2, 1949) was a Czech high-ranking police officer and politician. He served as prime minister of the Protectorate of Bohemia and Moravia from January 19 to May 5, 1945. After World War II he was sentenced to prison for collaboration with Nazis.

== Career ==
Born in Prague, Bienert came from a family of magistrates clerks from that city and after he finished law studies at Prague University he also entered the state service. Some of his ancestors were of German-Bohemian ethnic descent and had assimilated into Czech society. From 1906 he worked as a police official for police in Prague and in January 1918 he even became a clerk in the Presidium of the Police in Prague. During World War I Bienert cooperated closely with the Czech resistance movement and after the proclamation of Czechoslovak independence in October 1918 he was rewarded with an appointment to the position of Prague Police Director. Later in the 1930s he also became the Provincial President in the Land of Bohemia.

After the German occupation of Czechoslovakia in 1939, he was briefly arrested by the Germans but soon released in exchange for a pledge of loyalty. In 1942, after prime minister Eliáš was arrested by Heydrich, Bienert was appointed to minister of interior under the new prime minister Jaroslav Krejčí. In 1945 Bienert replaced Krejčí in this position and at the same time also served as the substitute for seriously ill president Hácha.

In an agreement with state secretary Frank, Bienert tried to broadcast the statement on the dissolution of the Protectorate (which should be replaced by Czech puppet state still controlled by Germans) on 5 May 1945. However the same morning the Prague uprising broke out and Bienert was captured by insurgents in the broadcasting room of City Hall.

After the end of World War II, Bienert was tried for treason and collaboration with the Nazis, but because of many mitigating circumstances he was sentenced to only three years in prison. Due to poor health, he was released prematurely in 1947, and died in Prague two years later.

Government offices
Preceded by Jaroslav Krejčí	Prime Minister of the Protectorate of Bohemia and Moravia; 1945	Succeeded by Zdeněk Fierlinger; Prime Minister of Czechoslovakia
