= Marie Háchová =

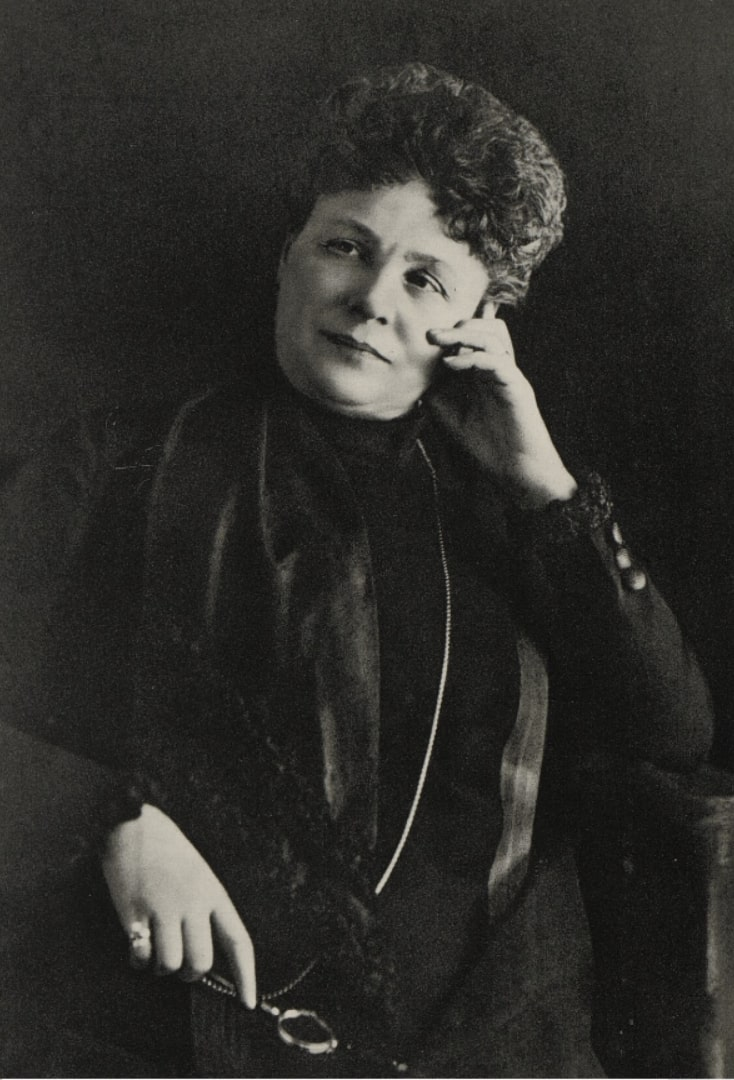
- Háchová in her 40s
- Born: Marie Klausová; 17 April 1873; Prague, Austria-Hungary
- Died: 6 February 1938 (aged 64); Prague, Czechoslovakia
- Spouse: Emil Hácha (m. 1902)
- Children: Milada Rádlová (1903–1989)

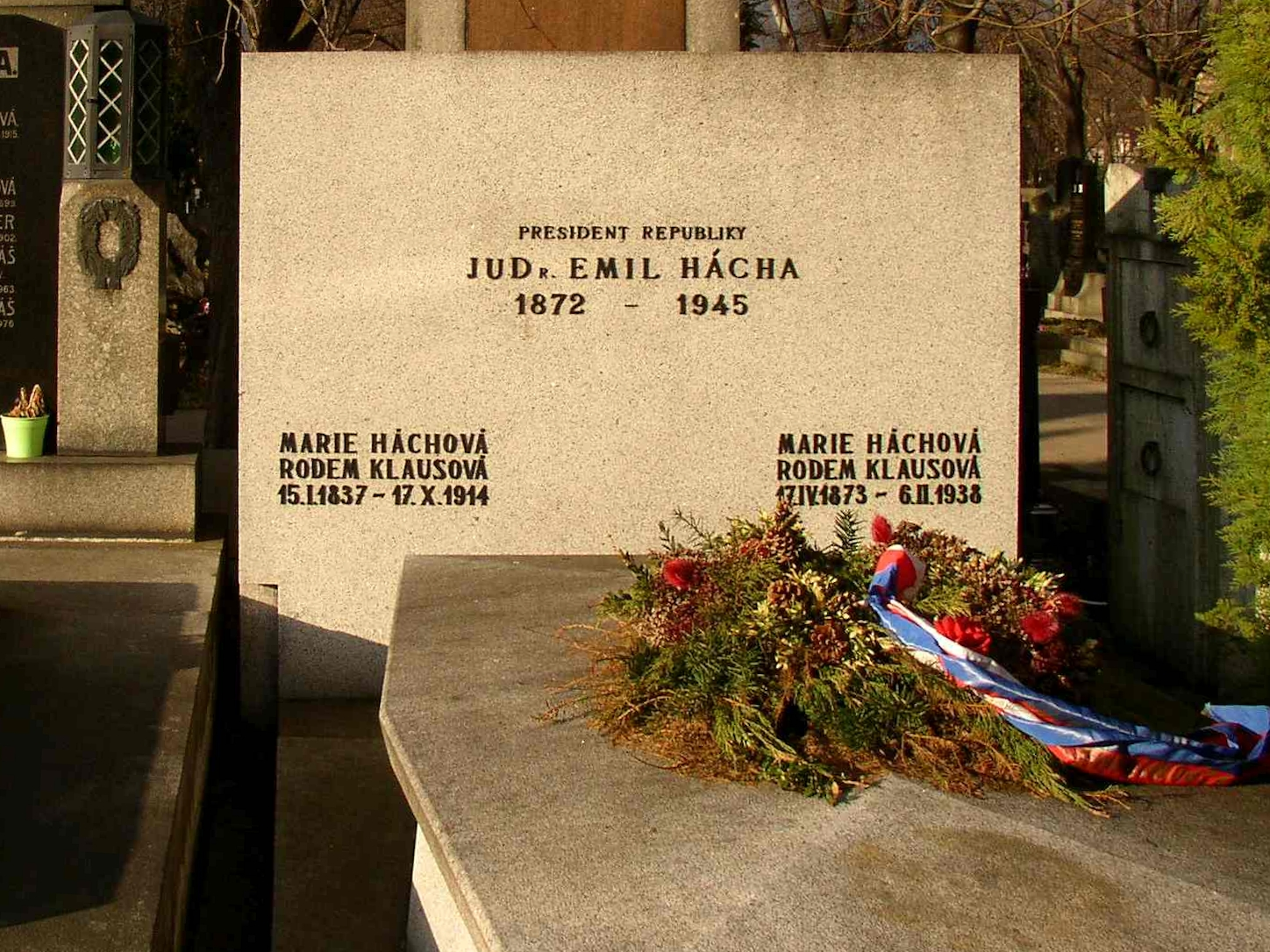
Tombstone of Emil Hácha and Marie Háchová

Marie Háchová (née Klausová; 17 April 1873 – 6 February 1938), was a Czech woman, the wife and a cousin of Emil Hácha (later third president of Czechoslovakia).

== Life ==
She was born on 17 April 1873 in a Prague-German Klaus family. In 1902, she married the later president of Czechoslovakia, Emil Hácha, and a year after that, their daughter Milada Rádlová was born. Marie died in Prague in 1938 at the age of 64. Emil Hácha was deeply affected by her death. In the same year, her daughter got divorced. Ten months after her death, Emil Hácha became the president of the Second Czechoslovak Republic. She and her husband are buried at the Vinohrady Cemetery in Prague.

== Literature ==
- Kosatík, Pavel (2009). Manželky prezidentů: deset žen z Hradu (in Czech) (3 ed.). Prague: Mladá fronta. pp. 141–147. ISBN 978-80-204-2077-0.
