= Karl Hermann Frank =

Reichsminister for Bohemia and Moravia, SS-Obergruppenführer (1898–1946)

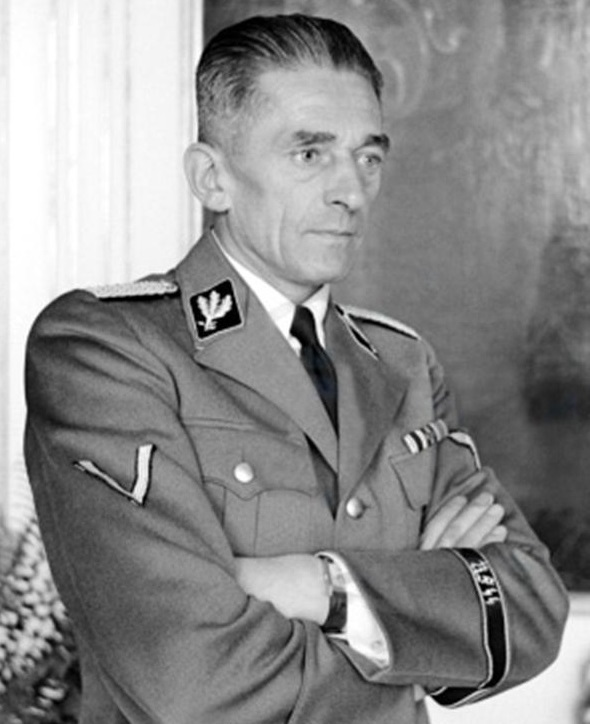
- Frank, (c. 1941)

Minister of State for Bohemia and Moravia
- In office 20 August 1943 – 8 May 1945
- Leader: Adolf Hitler (as Führer)
- Preceded by: Himself (as Secretary of State)
- Succeeded by: office abolished

Secretary of State for Bohemia and Moravia
- In office 19 March 1939 – 20 August 1943
- Leader: Adolf Hitler (as Führer)
- Preceded by: office established
- Succeeded by: Himself (as Minister of State)

Personal details
- Born: 24 January 1898 Karlsbad, Kingdom of Bohemia, Austria-Hungary
- Died: 22 May 1946 (aged 48) Pankrác Prison, Prague, Czechoslovakia
- Cause of death: Execution by hanging
- Resting place: Ďáblice Cemetery, Prague, Czechoslovakia
- Party: DNSAP (1919–1923); SdP (1933–1938); NSDAP (1938–1945)
- Spouses: Anna Müller (m. 1925; div. 1940); Karola Blasche (m. 1940)
- Children: 5
- Known for: Lidice massacre
- Criminal status: Deceased
- Conviction(s): War crimes
- Criminal penalty: Death by hanging

Military service
- Rank: SS-Obergruppenführer
- Commands: Higher SS and Police Leader for Protectorate of Bohemia and Moravia
- Awards: War Merit Cross with Swords, 2nd and 1st Class

Karl Hermann Frank (24 January 1898 – 22 May 1946) was a Sudeten German official in the Protectorate of Bohemia and Moravia prior to and during World War II. Attaining the rank of Obergruppenführer, he was in command of the Nazi police apparatus in the protectorate, including the Gestapo, the SD, and the Kripo. After the war, he was tried, convicted and executed by hanging for his role in organizing the massacres of the people of the Czech villages of Lidice and Ležáky.

== Early life ==
Born in Karlsbad, Bohemia, in Austria-Hungary (present-day Karlovy Vary, Czech Republic), Frank was taught by his father (a proponent of Georg Ritter von Schönerer's policies) about nationalist agitation. Frank attempted to enlist in the Austro-Hungarian Army in World War I, but he was rejected due to blindness in his right eye. He spent a year at the law school of the German language Charles University in Prague and worked as a tutor to make money.

A Sudeten German, Frank advocated of the incorporation of the Sudetenland into Germany, Frank joined the German National Socialist Workers' Party (DNSAP) by 1923 and was involved in setting up several DNSAP chapters in northern Bohemia and Silesia. In 1925, Frank opened a book store which specialized in Nazi literature. Frank joined and helped organize the Sudeten-German Homeland Front (SdH) in 1933, which officially became the Sudeten German Party (SdP) in 1935. He then worked in the SdP public relations and propaganda department.

In 1935, Frank became deputy leader of the SdP and was elected a member of the Czechoslovak Parliament. Coming to represent the most radical Nazis in the SdP, Frank was made Deputy Gauleiter of the Sudetenland when it became part of Germany in October 1938. Frank officially joined the Nazi Party (NSDAP) and the Schutzstaffel (SS) on 1 November 1938. On 4 December, he was elected as a deputy to the Reichstag representing the new Sudetenland constituency. He retained this seat until the fall of the Nazi regime in May 1945.

== World War II ==
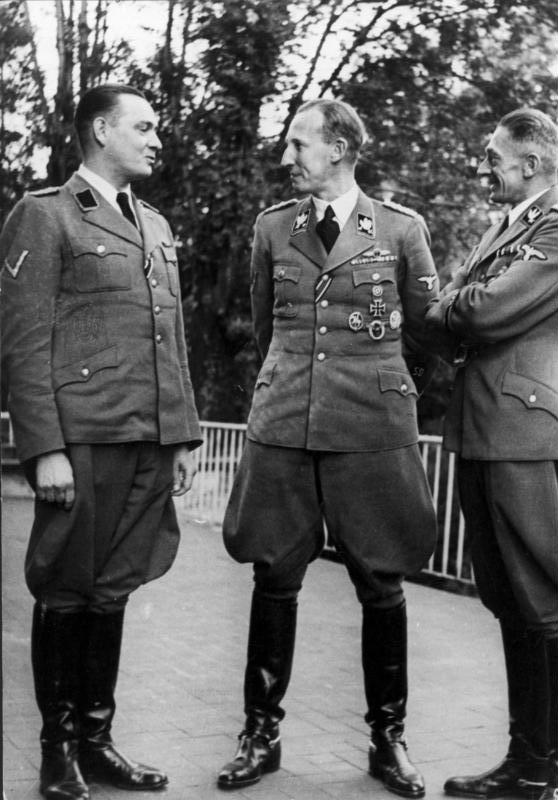
Reinhard Heydrich between Karl-Hermann Frank (right) and Horst Böhme (left) in Prague, September 1941

In 1939, Frank was promoted to SS-Gruppenführer and appointed Secretary of State of the Reich Protectorate of Bohemia and Moravia under Reich Protector Konstantin von Neurath. Himmler also named him the protectorate's Higher SS and Police Leader, making him its ranking SS officer. Although nominally under Neurath, Frank wielded great power in the protectorate. He controlled the Nazi police apparatus in the Protectorate, including the Gestapo, the SD, and the Kripo.

As Secretary of State and chief of police, Frank pursued a policy of harsh suppression of dissident Czechs and pushed for the arrest of Bohemia and Moravia's Prime Minister, Alois Eliáš. These actions by Frank were countered by Neurath's "soft approach" to the Czechs thereby encouraging anti-German resistance by strikes and sabotage. This frustrated Frank and led to him secretly working to discredit Neurath.

Hitler's decision to adopt a more radical approach in Bohemia and Moravia should have worked in Frank's favor. Hitler relieved Neurath of his active duties on 23 September 1941, though he still remained Reich Protector on paper. Frank hoped to be appointed as Deputy Protector and day-to-day head of the protectorate. Instead, Hitler chose Reinhard Heydrich, and gave him a mandate to enforce policy, fight resistance to the Nazi regime, and keep up production quotas of Czech motors and arms that were "extremely important to the German war effort". The working relationship between Frank and Heydrich was a good one as they both were ambitious and brutal. They launched a reign of terror in the protectorate, arresting and killing opponents and ramping up the deportation of Jews to concentration camps. According to Heydrich, between 4,000 and 5,000 people were arrested and between 400 and 500 were executed by February 1942. Adolf Eichmann described Frank as a Jew-hater of the "Streicher kind" who carried out oppression with exceptional brutality.

=== Massacre of Lidice ===
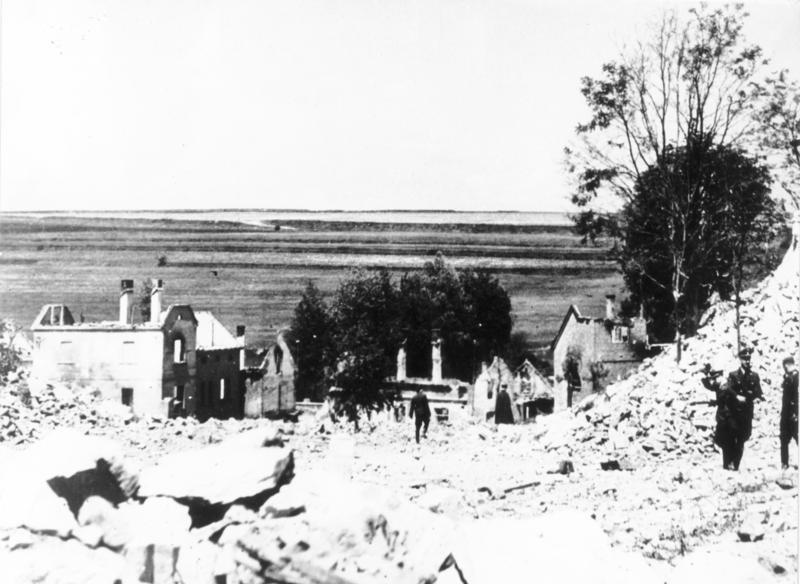
Destruction of Lidice

When Heydrich was assassinated in 1942, Frank was once again passed over for promotion to Deputy Protector; Kurt Daluege was chosen instead. Daluege and Frank were instrumental in initiating the destruction of the Czech villages of Lidice and Ležáky in order to take revenge on the Czech populace for Heydrich's death. When it came to the population of Lidice, Frank ordered Horst Böhme, the SiPo and SD chief in Prague, to shoot all the men, send all the women to concentration camps, and place those few children considered worthy of "Germanization" in the care of SS families in Germany, with the rest being murdered.

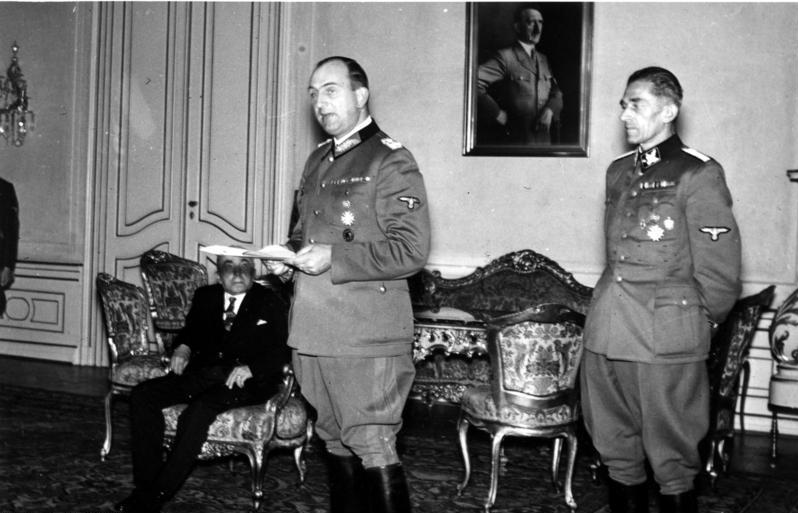
Emil Hácha (in the background), State President of Bohemia and Moravia, Daluege and Frank, September 1942

In June 1943, Frank was promoted to SS-Obergruppenführer and General of Police in Prague. Frank was also made a General of the Waffen-SS. Under Daluege, Frank continued to consolidate his power, and by the time Wilhelm Frick was appointed Reich Protector in August 1943, Frank was the most powerful official in Bohemia and Moravia. In August 1943, he was made Minister of State for Bohemia and Moravia and was granted cabinet rank and status, but without the formal title of Reichsminister.

=== Anti-partisan operations ===
In 1944, he personally conducted anti-partisan warfare in Moravia aimed at destroying the Jan Žižka partisan brigade. Despite the deployment of 13,000 soldiers and summary executions of civilians suspected of supporting the partisans, the Germans were unable to destroy the partisan brigade and falsely concluded that the threat had been eliminated.

== Trial and execution ==
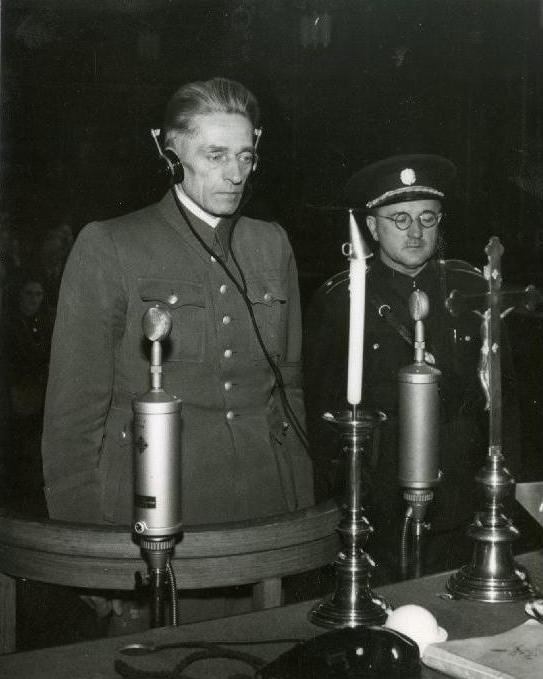
Frank in front of the People's Court in Prague, 21 May 1946

Frank was arrested by U.S. Army troops in the area of Rokycany on 9 May 1945. He was extradited to the People's Court in Prague and tried in 1946. After being convicted of war crimes and the destruction of Lidice and Ležáky, Frank was sentenced to death. He was hanged using the pole hanging method on 22 May 1946 in the courtyard of the Pankrác Prison in Prague, in front of 5,000 onlookers. He was buried in an anonymous pit at Prague's Ďáblice Cemetery.

== Personal life ==
Frank was married twice. On 21 January 1925 he married Anna Müller (born 5 January 1899 in Karlsbad). The couple had two sons Harald, born 20 January 1926, and Gerhard, born 22 April 1931. They divorced on 17 February 1940 and later that year, Müller married Frank's successor as deputy Gauleiter of Sudetenland, SA-Brigadeführer Fritz Köllner.

On 14 April 1940 Frank married a physician, Karola Blaschek (born 13 August 1913 in Brüx). The couple had three children together, two daughters Edda, (born 16 August 1941) and Holle-Sigrid (born 8 March 1944), and a son Wolf-Dietrich (born 20 August 1942).

== Bibliography ==
- Bryant, Chad Carl (2007). Prague in Black: Nazi Rule and Czech Nationalism. Cambridge, MA: Harvard University Press. ISBN 978-0-674-02451-9.
- Hrošová, Marie (2012), Na každém kroku boj (1st ed.), Nové Město u Chlumce nad Cidlinou: Český svaz bojovníků za svobodu, ISBN 978-80-260-2483-5
- Miller, Michael (2006). Leaders of the SS and German Police, Vol. 1. R. James Bender Publishing. ISBN 978-93-297-0037-2.
- Suchánková, Kateřina (2013). "Protipartyzánská operace Tetřev v roce 1944" (PDF). Masaryk University.
- Williams, Max (2003). Reinhard Heydrich: The Biography, Volume 2—Enigma. Church Stretton: Ulric Publishing. ISBN 978-0-9537577-6-3.
- Wistrich, Robert S. (1982). Who's Who in Nazi Germany. Macmillan Publishing Co. ISBN 0-02-630600-X.
- Zentner, Christian; Bedürftig, Friedemann (1997) [1991]. The Encyclopedia of the Third Reich. New York: Da Capo Press. ISBN 978-0-3068079-3-0.
