= Jaroslav Krejčí =

Czechoslovak politician (1892–1956)

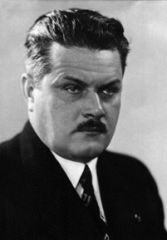

Prime Minister of Bohemia and Moravia
- In office 19 January 1942 – 19 January 1945
- President: Emil Hácha
- Preceded by: Alois Eliáš
- Succeeded by: Richard Bienert

Acting
- In office 28 September 1941 – 19 January 1942

Personal details
- Born: 27 June 1892 Křemenec, Austria-Hungary
- Died: 18 May 1956 (aged 63) Prague, Czechoslovakia
- Children: Jaroslav Krejčí
- Education: Faculty of Law, Charles University in Prague
- Occupation: Politician, jurist

Jaroslav Krejčí (27 June 1892 – 18 May 1956) was a Czech lawyer and Nazi collaborator. He served as the prime minister of the Protectorate of Bohemia and Moravia from 28 September 1941 to 19 January 1945. After the war, Krejčí was sentenced to a 25-year prison term and subsequently died while in prison.

== Biography ==
Krejčí was born on 27 June 1892 in Křemenec, Moravia, Austria-Hungary. After graduating from the Faculty of Law at Charles University in 1915, he worked in the civil service in various positions. During the 1930s, he also lectured on constitutional law at Masaryk University (from 1938 as a professor).

From 12 December 1938 to 3 March 1939, he was minister of justice in Rudolf Beran's government of the Czechoslovak Second Republic and head of the Czechoslovak Constitutional Court. He served as minister of justice in all Protectorate of Bohemia and Moravia governments, and temporarily he was also minister of agriculture. From 28 September 1941 to 19 January 1945 he was prime minister, replacing Alois Eliáš, who had supported the underground resistance to the Nazis and was executed. Krejčí was a close friend of President Emil Hácha. Krejčí and his government fully cooperated with the Germans. The most infamous member of his government was Emanuel Moravec, a symbol of Czech collaboration with the Nazis.

Wolf Gruner wrote that Krejčí "enthusiastically paid homage to Nazi rule."

Krejčí was arrested on 12 May 1945 and sentenced to 25 years imprisonment in Pankrác prison in Prague under the Retribution Decree, where he died on 18 May 1956.

His son, Jaroslav Krejčí (1916–2014), was a Czech lawyer, sociologist, and professor at Lancaster University in the United Kingdom.

Government offices
Preceded by Alois Eliáš	Prime Minister of Protectorate of Bohemia and Moravia; 27 September 1941 – 19 January 1945	Succeeded by Richard Bienert
