= Protectorate of Bohemia and Moravia =

Territory of Nazi Germany (1939–1945)

Protectorate of Bohemia and Moravia Protektorat Böhmen und Mähren (German) Protektorát Čechy a Morava (Czech)
- 1939–1945
- Flag Coat of arms
- Anthem: Kde domov můj / Wo ist mein Heim "Where Is My Home"
- The Protectorate of Bohemia and Moravia in 1942, in dark green, while the other parts of Nazi Germany are in light green
- Status: nominal Protectorate and partially annexed territory within Nazi Germany
- Capital and largest city: Prague; 50°05′N 14°25′E
- Official languages: German · Czech
- Government: Dual government
- Reich Protector
  - 1939–1943: Konstantin von Neurath
  - 1941–1942 (acting): Reinhard Heydrich
  - 1942–1943 (acting): Kurt Daluege
  - 1943–1945: Wilhelm Frick
- State President
  - 1939–1945: Emil Hácha
- Prime Minister
  - 1939 (acting): Rudolf Beran
  - 1939–1941: Alois Eliáš
  - 1941–1945: Jaroslav Krejčí
  - 1945: Richard Bienert
- History
  - German occupation: 15 March 1939
  - German surrender: 8 May 1945
- Currency: Protectorate koruna
Preceded by	Succeeded by
Second Czechoslovak Republic	Third Czechoslovak Republic
- Today part of: Czech Republic

The Protectorate of Bohemia and Moravia (Note: German: Protektorat Böhmen und Mähren; Czech: Protektorát Čechy a Morava; the Nazis called its territory Resttschechei (lit. 'remnant Czechia').) was a partially annexed territory of Nazi Germany that was established on 16 March 1939 after the German occupation of the Czech lands. The protectorate's population was mostly ethnic Czechs.

After the Munich Agreement of September 1938, the German Reich had annexed the German-majority Sudetenland to Germany from Czechoslovakia in October 1938. Following the establishment of the independent Slovak Republic on 14 March 1939, and the German occupation of the Czech rump state the next day, Adolf Hitler established the protectorate on 16 March 1939, issuing a proclamation from Prague Castle. The creation of the protectorate violated the Munich Agreement.

The protectorate remained nominally autonomous and had a dual system of government, with German law applying to ethnic Germans while other residents had the legal status of Protectorate subjects and were governed by a puppet Czech administration. During World War II (1939–1945), the well-trained Czech workforce and developed industry were forced to make a major contribution to the German war economy. Since the Protectorate was just out of the reach of Allied bombers based in the United Kingdom, the Czech economy was able to work almost undisturbed until the end of the war. The Protectorate administration became deeply involved in the Holocaust in Bohemia and Moravia.

The state's existence came to an end with the surrender of Germany to the Allies in May 1945. After the war, some Protectorate officials were charged with collaborationism, but according to the prevailing belief in Czech society, the Protectorate was not entirely rejected as a collaborationist entity.

== Background ==
The Four Year Plan that Hitler launched in September 1936 to have the German economy ready for a "total war" by 1940 was faltering by 1937 owing to a shortage of foreign exchange to pay for the vast economic demands imposed by the ambitious armaments targets as Germany lacked many of the necessary raw materials, which had to be imported. The British historian Richard Overy wrote the huge demands of the Four Year Plan "...could not be fully met by a policy of import substitution and industrial rationalization". In November 1937 at the Hossbach Conference, Hitler announced that to stay ahead in the arms race with the other powers, Germany had to seize Czechoslovakia in the very near-future. Czechoslovakia was the world's 7th largest manufacturer of arms, making Czechoslovakia into an important player in the global arms trade.

After Czechoslovakia accepted the terms of the Munich Agreement of 30 September 1938, Nazi Germany incorporated the ethnic German majority Sudetenland regions along the German border directly into Nazi Germany. Five months later, the Nazis violated the Munich Agreement, when, with Nazi German support, the Slovak parliament declared the independence of the Slovak Republic, Adolf Hitler invited Czechoslovak President Emil Hácha to Berlin and the latter accepted his request for the German occupation of the Czech rump state and its reorganization as a German protectorate.

Hitler's wish to occupy Czechoslovakia was largely caused by the foreign exchange crisis as Germany had exhausted its foreign exchange reserves by early 1939, and Germany urgently needed to seize the gold of the Czechoslovak central bank to continue the Four Year Plan. The British historian Victor Rothwell wrote that the Czechoslovak reserves of gold and hard currency seized in March 1939 were "invaluable in staving off Germany's foreign exchange crisis".

On 16 March when Hitler proclaimed the protectorate, he declared: "For a thousand years the provinces of Bohemia and Moravia formed part of the Lebensraum of the German people."

There was no real precedent for this action in German history. The model for the protectorate were the Princely states in India under the Raj. In the same way that Indian maharajahs in the Princely states were allowed a nominal independence, the real power rested with the British resident stationed to monitor the maharajah, Hitler emulated this practice with the Protectorate of Bohemia-Moravia as the German media quite explicitly compared the relationship between the Reich Protector, Baron Konstantin von Neurath and President Emil Hácha to that of a British resident and an Indian maharajah. Neurath seems to have been chosen as Reich Protector because, as a former foreign minister and a former ambassador to the United Kingdom, he was well known in London for his avuncular but dignified manner, which were personality traits associated with the popular image of a British person. Hitler believed that emulating the Raj would make this violation of the Munich Agreement more acceptable to Britain; as that proved not to be the case, the German media launched a lengthy campaign denouncing British "hypocrisy". The German authorities intentionally allowed the protectorate "all the trappings of independence" in order to encourage the Czech inhabitants to collaborate with them. However, despite the protectorate having its own postage stamps and presidential guard, real power lay with the Nazi authorities.

== History ==
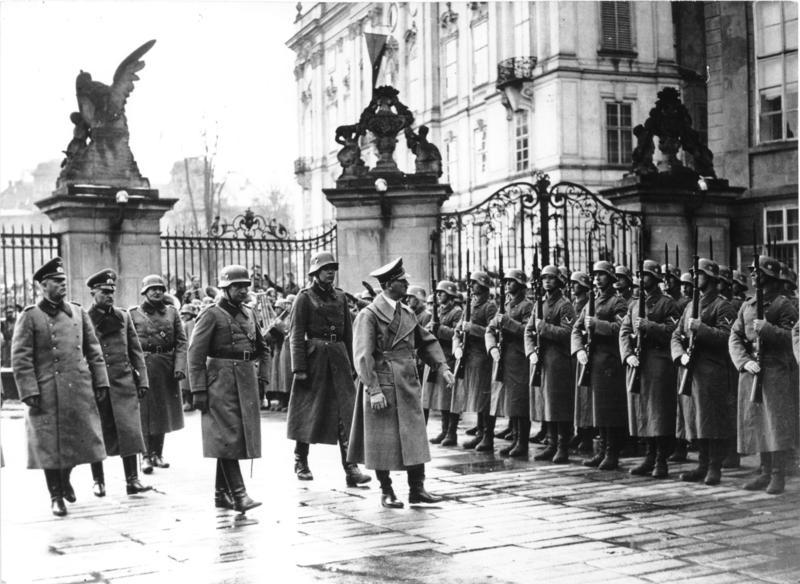
Hitler on his visit to Prague Castle after the establishment of the German protectorate

The population of the protectorate was mobilized for labor that would aid the German war effort, and special offices were organized to supervise the management of industries important to that effort. The Germans drafted Czechs to work in coal mines, in the iron and steel industry, and in armaments production. Consumer-goods production, much diminished, was largely directed toward supplying the German armed forces. The protectorate's population was subjected to rationing. The Czech crown was devalued to the Reichsmark at the rate of 10 crowns to 1 Reichsmark, though the actual rate should have been 6 crowns for 1 Reichsmark, a policy that allowed the Germans to buy everything on the cheap in the protectorate. Inflation was a major problem throughout the existence of the protectorate, which was made worse by the refusal of the German authorities to raise wages to keep up with inflation, making the era a period of decreasing living standards as the crowns bought less and less. Even members of the volksdeutsche (ethnic Germans) living in the protectorate complained their living standards had been higher under Czechoslovakia, which was quite a surprise to most of them, who expected their living standards to rise under German rule.

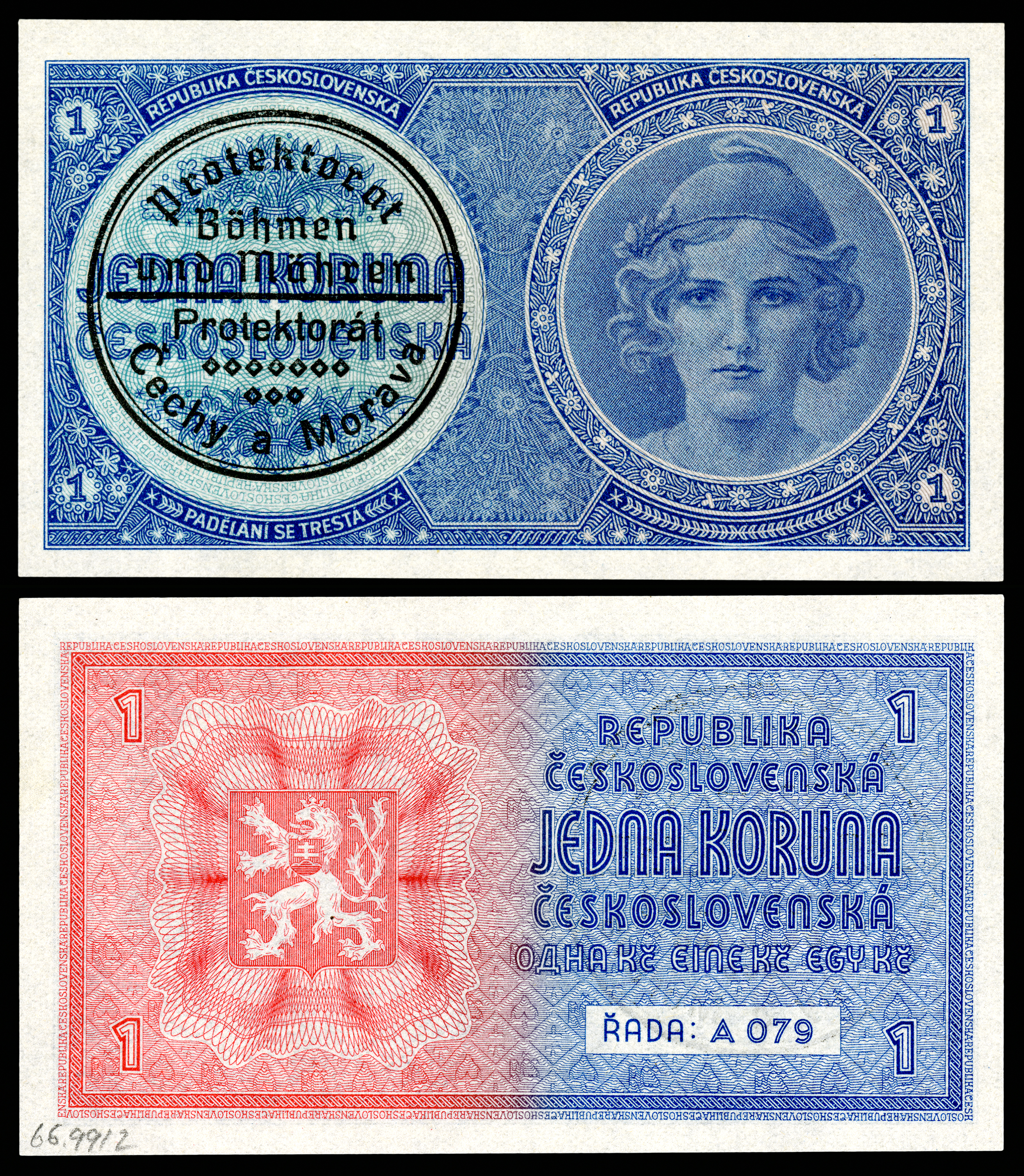
First issue of currency in Protectorate of Bohemia and Moravia (an unissued 1938 Czechoslovak note with a validation stamp for use in 1939)

German rule was moderate by Nazi standards during the first months of the occupation. The Czech government and political system, reorganized by Hácha, continued in formal existence. The Gestapo directed its activities mainly against Czech politicians and the intelligentsia. In 1940, in a secret plan on Germanization of the Protectorate of Bohemia and Moravia, it was declared that those considered to be racially Mongoloid and the Czech intelligentsia were not to be Germanized, and that about half of the Czech population were suitable for Germanization. Generalplan Ost assumed that around 50% of Czechs would be fit for Germanization. The Czech intellectual elite were to be removed from Czech territories and from Europe completely. The authors of Generalplan Ost believed it would be best if they emigrated overseas, as even in Siberia, they were considered a threat to German rule. Just like Jews, Poles, Serbs, and several other nations, Czechs were considered to be Untermenschen by the Nazi state. The Czechs however, were not subjected to a similar degree of random and organized acts of brutality that their Polish counterparts experienced. This is attributed to the view within the Nazi hierarchy that a large swath of the populace was "capable of Aryanization", such capacity for Aryanization was supported by the position that part of the Czech population had German ancestry. There is also the fact that a relatively restrained policy in Czech lands was partly driven by the need to keep the population nourished and complacent so that it can carry out the vital work of arms production in the factories. By 1939, the country was already serving as a major hub of military production for Germany, manufacturing aircraft, tanks, artillery, and other armaments.

The Czechs demonstrated against the occupation on 28 October 1939, the 21st anniversary of Czechoslovak independence. The death on 15 November 1939 of a medical student, Jan Opletal, who had been wounded in the October violence, precipitated widespread student demonstrations, and the Germans retaliated. Politicians were arrested en masse, as were an estimated 1,800 students and teachers. On 17 November, all universities and colleges in the protectorate were closed, nine student leaders were executed, and 1,200 were sent to the Sachsenhausen concentration camp within Nazi Germany; further arrests and executions of Czech students and professors took place later during the occupation.

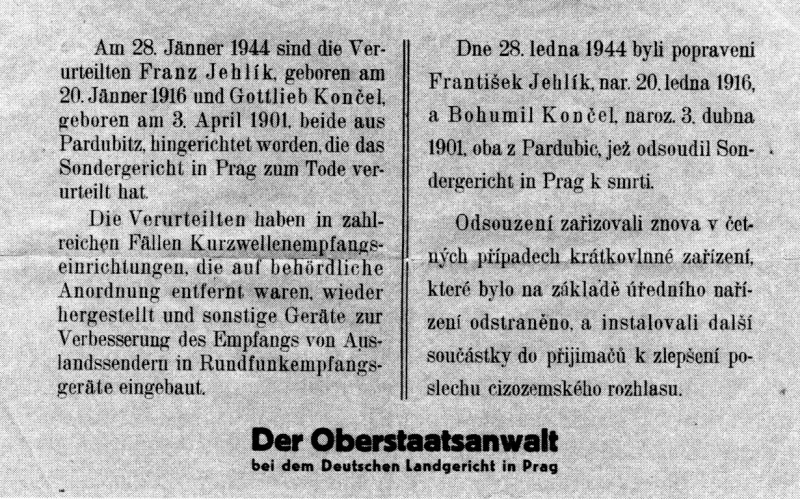
Announcement of the execution of Czechs, who improved radio receivers to listen to foreign broadcasts, 1944

During World War II, Hitler decided that Neurath was not treating the Czechs harshly enough and adopted a more radical policy in the protectorate. On 29 September 1941, Hitler appointed SS hardliner Reinhard Heydrich as Deputy Reichsprotektor (Stellvertretender Reichsprotektor). At the same time, he relieved Neurath of his day-to-day duties. For all intents and purposes, Heydrich replaced Neurath as Reichsprotektor. Under Heydrich's authority Prime Minister Alois Eliáš was arrested (and later executed), the Czech government was reorganized, and all Czech cultural organizations were closed. The Gestapo arrested and murdered people. The deportation of Jews to concentration camps was organized, and the fortress town of Terezín was made into a ghetto way-station for Jewish families.

On 4 June 1942, Heydrich died after being wounded by Czechoslovak Commandos in Operation Anthropoid. Directives issued by Heydrich's successor, SS-Oberstgruppenführer Kurt Daluege, and martial law brought forth mass arrests, executions and the obliteration of the villages of Lidice and Ležáky. In 1943 the German war-effort was accelerated. Under the authority of Karl Hermann Frank, German minister of state for Bohemia and Moravia, within the protectorate, all non-war-related industry was prohibited. Most of the Czech population obeyed quietly until the final months preceding the end of the war, when thousands became involved in the resistance movement.

For the Czechs of the Protectorate of Bohemia and Moravia, German occupation represented a period of oppression. The number of Czech victims of political persecution and murders in concentration camps totalled between 36,000 and 55,000. After Heydrich assumed control of the Protectorate, he instituted martial law and stepped up arrests and executions of resistance fighters. Heydrich allegedly referred to Czechs as "laughing beasts", reflecting Czech subversion and Nazi racial beliefs about the inferiority of Czechs.

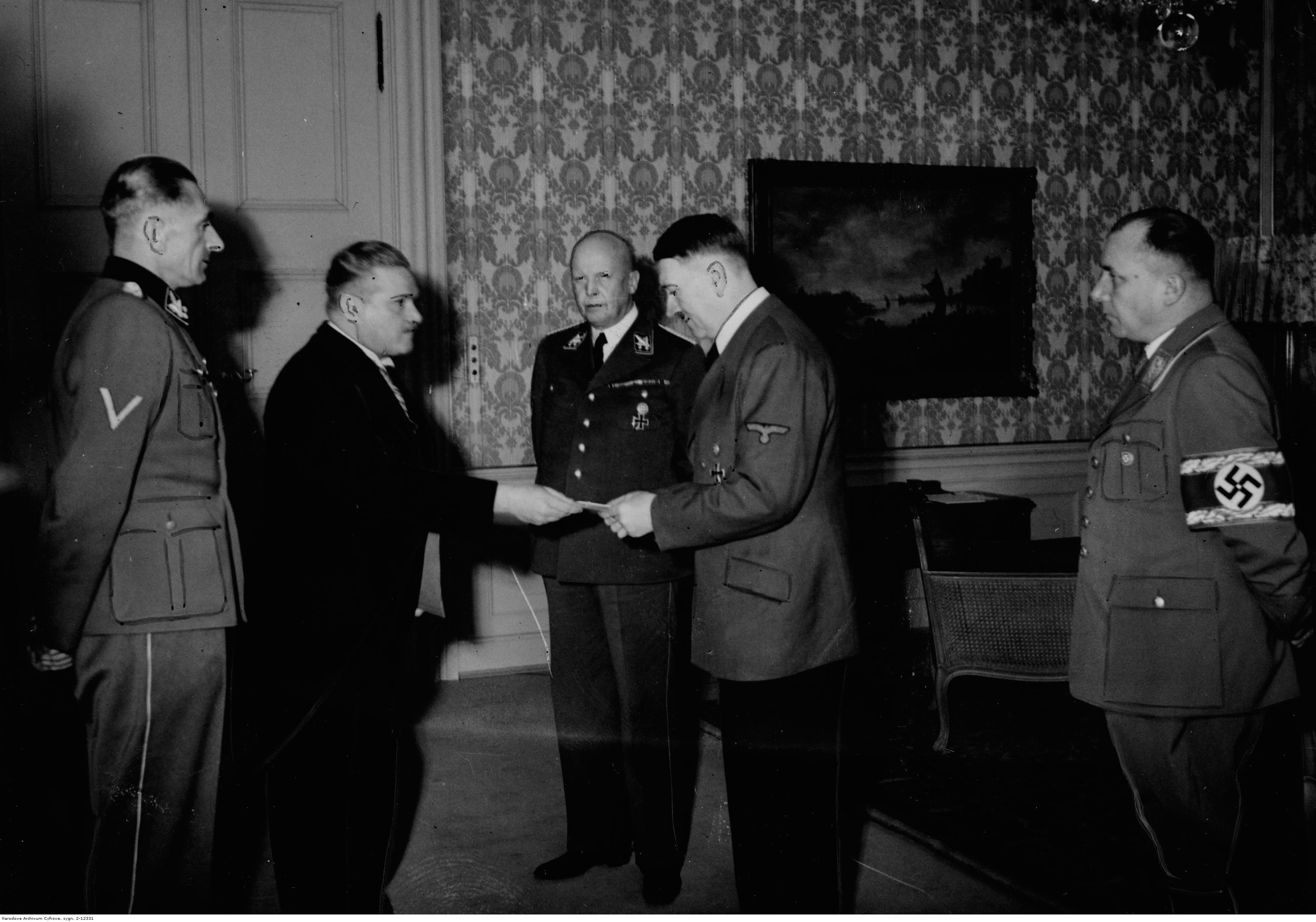
Adolf Hitler and prime minister Jaroslav Krejčí at the celebration of the fifth anniversary of the Protectorate of Bohemia and Moravia held at Klessheim Castle. 15 March 1944

The Jewish population of Bohemia and Moravia (118,000 according to the 1930 census) was virtually annihilated, with over 75,000 murdered. Of the 92,199 people classified as Jews by German authorities in the Protectorate as of 1939, 78,154 were murdered in the Holocaust, or 85 percent.

Many Jews emigrated after 1939; 8,000 survived at the Terezín concentration camp, which was used for propaganda purposes as a showpiece. Several thousand Jews managed to live in freedom or in hiding throughout the occupation. The extermination of the Romani population was so thorough that the Bohemian Romani language became totally extinct. Romani internees were sent to the Lety and Hodonín concentration camps before being transferred to Auschwitz-Birkenau for gassing. The vast majority of Romani in the Czech Republic today descend from migrants from Slovakia who moved there within post-war Czechoslovakia. The Theresienstadt concentration camp was located in the Protectorate, near the border to the Reichsgau Sudetenland. It was designed to concentrate the Jewish population from the Protectorate and gradually move them to extermination camps, and it also held Western European and German Jews. While not an extermination camp itself, the harsh and unhygienic conditions still resulted in the death of 33,000 of the 140,000 Jews brought to the camp while a further 88,000 were sent to extermination camps, and only 19,000 survived.

== Politics ==
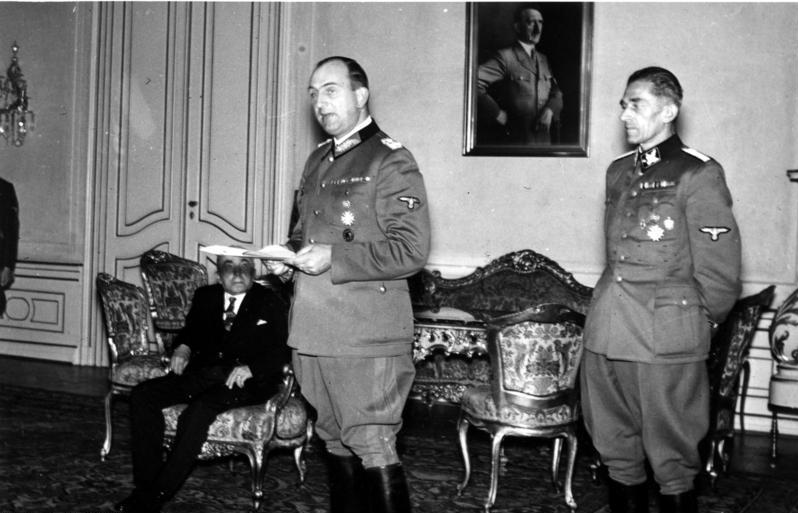
Czech State President of the Protectorate, Emil Hácha (sitting), listening to a speech of Reichsprotektor Kurt Daluege next to SS and Police General Karl Hermann Frank in Prague, September 1942.

Standard of the Reich Protector (1939–1944)

Standard of the State President

After the establishment of the Protectorate all political parties were outlawed, with the exception of the National Partnership (Národní souručenství). Membership of the Národní souručenství was closed to women and Jews. In the spring of 1939, about 2,130,000 men joined the group, amounting to between 98%–99% of the Czech male population. However, much of the registration for the Národní souručenství was done in the style of a census (a traditional outlet for nationalist feeling in the Czech lands), and the messages advocating joining the Národní souručenství emphasized that the group existed to affirm the Czech character of Bohemia-Moravia.

One spy for the government-in-exile in London reported: "The original, observable chaos and later fear of Gestapo informants and uncertainty has changed to courage and hope. The nation is coming together, not only in the National Solidarity Movement, which the majority did only to avoid losing our national existence, but individuals are coming together and one begins to feel if the nation has a backbone again". This local Czech Fascist party was led by a ruling Presidium until 1942, after which a Vůdce (Leader) for the party was appointed.

=== German government ===
Ultimate authority within the Protectorate was held by the Reich Protector (Reichsprotektor), the area's senior Nazi administrator, whose task it was to represent the interests of the German state. The office and title were held by a variety of persons during the Protectorate's existence. In succession these were:

- 21 March 1939 – 24 August 1943:

Konstantin von Neurath, former Foreign Minister of Nazi Germany (1932–1938) and Minister without Portfolio (1938–1945). He was placed on leave in September 1941 after Hitler's dissatisfaction with his "soft policies", although he still held the title of Reichsprotektor until his official resignation in August 1943.

- 29 September 1941 – 4 June 1942:

Reinhard Heydrich, chief of the SS-Reichssicherheitshauptamt (Reich Security Main Office) or RSHA. He was officially only a deputy to Neurath, but in reality was granted supreme authority over the entire state apparatus of the Protectorate.

- 5 June 1942 – 24 August 1943:

Kurt Daluege, Chief of the Ordnungspolizei (Order Police) or Orpo, in the Interior Ministry, who was also officially a deputy Reich Protector.

- 24 August 1943 – 8 May 1945:

Wilhelm Frick, former Minister of the Interior (1933–1943) and Minister without Portfolio (1943–1945).

Next to the Reich Protector there was also a political office of State Secretary (from 1943 known as the State Minister to the Reich Protector) who handled most of the internal security. From 1939 to 1945 this person was Karl Hermann Frank the senior SS and Police Leader in the Protectorate. A command of the Allgemeine-SS was also established, known as the SS-Oberabschnitt Böhmen-Mähren. The command was an active unit of the General-SS, technically the only such unit to exist outside of Germany, since most other Allgemeine-SS units in occupied or conquered countries were largely paper commands.

=== Czech government ===
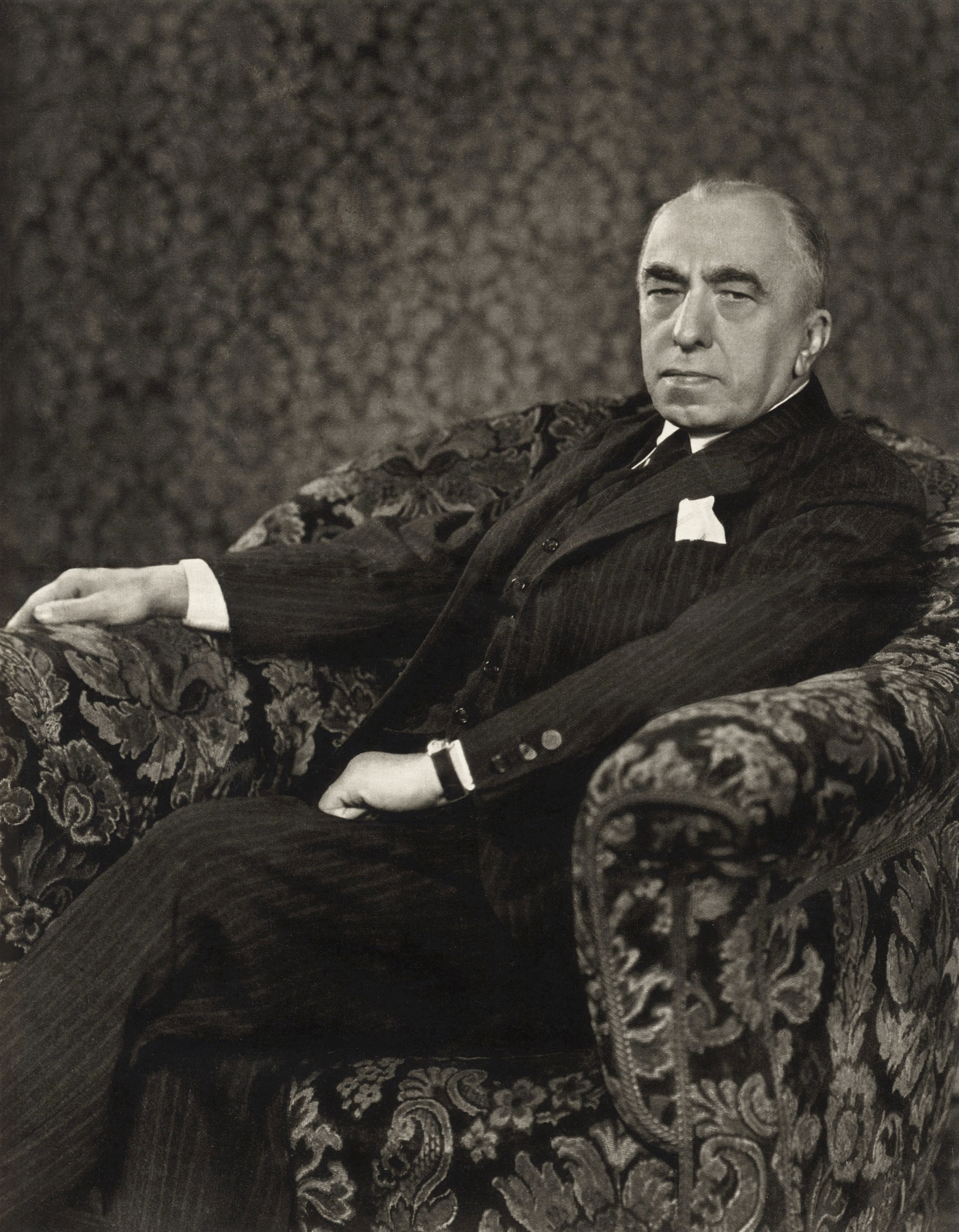
Emil Hácha, nominal State President of the Protectorate of Bohemia and Moravia, 1939–1945

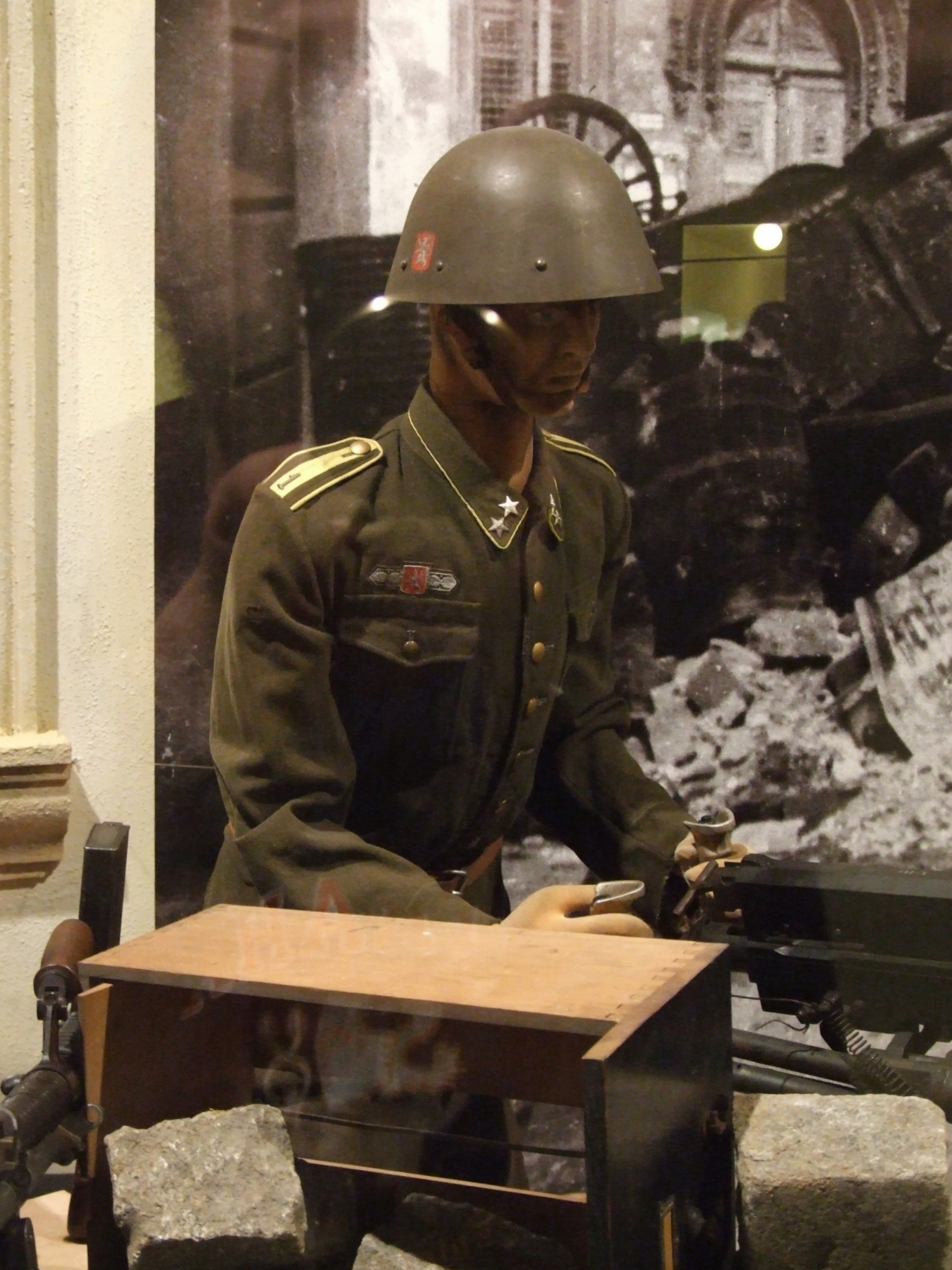
Uniform of the Government Army (Vládní vojsko)

The Czech State President (Státní Prezident) under the period of German rule from 1939 to 1945 was Emil Hácha (1872–1945), who had been the President of the Second Czechoslovak Republic since November 1938. Rudolf Beran (1887–1954) continued to hold the office of Minister President (Předseda vlády) after the German take-over. He was replaced by Alois Eliáš on 27 April 1939, who was himself also sacked on 2 October 1941 not long after the appointment of Reinhard Heydrich as the new Reich Protector. Because of his contacts with the Czechoslovak government-in-exile Eliáš was sentenced to death, and the execution was carried out on 19 June 1942 shortly after Heydrich's own death. From 19 January 1942 the government was led by Jaroslav Krejčí, and from January to May 1945 by Richard Bienert, the former police chief of Prague. When the dissolution of the Protectorate was proclaimed after the Liberation of Prague, a radio call was issued for Bienert's arrest. This resulted in his conviction to a three-year prison term in 1947, during which he died in 1949.

Aside from the Office of the Minister President, the local Czech government in the Protectorate consisted of the Ministries of Education, Finance, Justice, Trade, the Interior, Agriculture, and Public Labour. The area's foreign policy and military defence were under the exclusive control of the German government. The former foreign minister of Czechoslovakia František Chvalkovský became a Minister without Portfolio and permanent representative of the Czech administration in Berlin.

The most prominent Czech politicians in the Protectorate included:

Portfolio	Minister	Took office	Left office	Party
Czech State President	Emil Hácha	16 March 1939	9 May 1945	NS
Minister President	Rudolf Beran	16 March 1939	27 April 1939	SNJ
Minister President	Alois Eliáš (Note: a former Czechoslovak General who was executed for his secret contacts with the Czechoslovak Government-in-Exile in 1942)	27 April 1939	2 October 1941	Independent
Minister President	Jaroslav Krejčí	19 January 1942	19 January 1945	NS
Minister President	Richard Bienert	January 1945	May 1945	NS
Leader of the Party	Josef Nebeský	1939	1941	NS
Leader of the Party	Josef Fousek	1941	1942	NS
Leader of the Party	Tomáš Krejčí	1942	1945	NS
Minister of Justice	Jaroslav Krejčí	1939	1945	NS
Minister of Interior	Josef Ježek	1939	1942	NS
Minister of Interior	Richard Bienert	1942	1945	NS
Minister of Finance	Josef Kalfus	16 March 1939	5 May 1945	NS
Minister of Economics	Walter Bertsch	1942	1945	NSDAP
Minister of Agriculture	Ladislav Karel Feierabend (Note: Joined the London-based Czechoslovak government in 1940.)	1939	1940	Independent
Minister of Agriculture	Mikuláš z Bubna-Litic	February 1940	January 1942	NS
Minister of Agriculture	Adolf Hrubý	19 January 1942	5 May 1945	NS
Minister of Traffic	Jiří Havelka	April 1939	April 1941	Independent
Minister of Traffic	Jindřich Kamenický	April 1941	5 May 1945	NS
Minister of Education	Jan Kapras	16 March 1939	19 January 1942	NS
Minister of Education	Emanuel Moravec	19 January 1942	5 May 1945	NS
Minister without Portfolio	Jiří Havelka	March 1939	April 1939	Independent

== Population ==
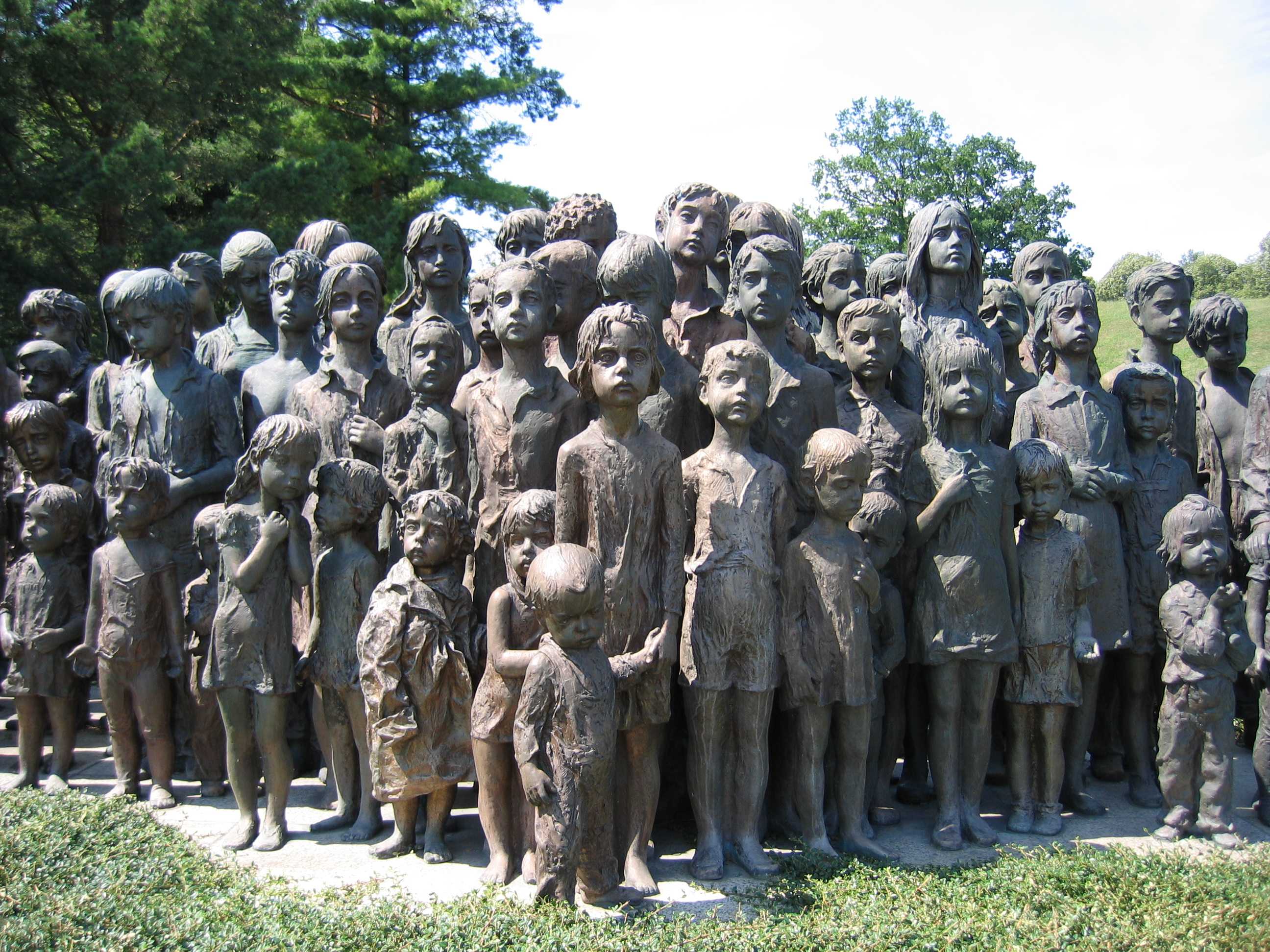
Memorial to the murdered children of Lidice. Some Lidice children were spared because they were considered suitable for "Germanization".

The area of the Protectorate of Bohemia and Moravia contained about 7,380,000 inhabitants in 1940. 225,000 (3.3%) of these were of German origin, while the rest were mainly ethnic Czechs as well as some Slovaks, particularly near the border with Slovakia. Ethnic Germans were offered Reich citizenship, while Jews and Czechs were from the outset second-class citizens ("Protectorate subjects", German: Protektoratsangehörige).

In March 1939, Karl Frank defined a "German national" as:

Whoever professes himself to be a member of the German nation is a member of the German nation, provided that this profession is confirmed by certain facts, such as language, upbringing, culture, etc. Persons of alien blood, particularly Jews, are never Germans. . . . Because professing to be a member of the German nation is of vital significance, even someone who is partly or completely of another race—Czech, Slovak, Ukrainian, Hungarian, or Polish, for example—can be considered a German. Any more precise elaboration of the term "German national" is not possible given current relationships.

The Nazis aimed for the protectorate to become fully Germanized. Marriages between Czechs and Germans became a problem for the Nazis. In 1939, the Nazis did not ban sexual relations between Germans and Czechs and no law prohibited Jews from marrying Czechs. The Nazis made German women who married any non-Germans lose their Reich citizenship whereas Czech women who married German men were accepted into the German Volk. Czech families aiming to improve their lives in the protectorate encouraged their Czech daughters to marry German men as it was one way to save a family business.

Hitler had approved a plan designed by Konstantin von Neurath and Karl Hermann Frank, which projected the Germanization of the "racially valuable" half of the Czech population after the end of the war. This consisted mainly of industrial workers and farmers. The undesirable half contained the intelligentsia, whom the Nazis viewed as ungermanizable and potential dangerous instigators of Czech nationalism. Some 9,000 Volksdeutsche from Bukovina, Dobruja, South Tyrol, Bessarabia, Sudetenland and the Altreich were settled in the protectorate during the war. The goal was to create a German settlement belt from Prague to Sudetenland, and to turn the surroundings of Olomouc (Olmütz), České Budějovice (Budweis), Brno (Brünn) and the area near the Slovak border into German enclaves.

Further integration of the protectorate into the Reich was carried out by the employment of German apprentices, by transferring German evacuee children into schools located in the protectorate, and by authorizing marriages between Germans and "assimilable" Czechs. Germanizable Czechs were allowed to join the Reich Labour Service and to be admitted to German universities.

== Education ==
In common with the other "submerged" nations of Eastern Europe, the Czech intelligentsia had an immense prestige as the bearers and protectors of the national culture, who would keep the Czech language and culture alive when the Czech nation was "submerged". No segment of the Czech intelligentsia faced more pressure to conform to the occupation policy than school teachers. Frank called the teachers "the most dangerous wing of the intelligentsia" while Heydrich referred to the teachers as "the training core of the opposition Czech government [in exile in London]". To keep their jobs, teachers were required to demonstrate fluency in German and were supposed to greet their students with the fascist salute while saying "Sieg Heil!" ("Hail Victory!"). School inspectors made surprise visits to the classrooms and all chairpersons of the exam boards had to be ethnic Germans. Some teachers and students were Gestapo informers, which spread a climate of mistrust and paranoia across the school system as both teachers and students never knew whom to trust. One teacher recalled: "The Gestapo even had informers and agents amongst the children. Uncertainty and mistrust destroyed any feeling of comradeship among the children".

Despite these pressures, a number of Czech teachers quietly inserted "anti-Reich" ideas into their lessons while refusing to greet their students with "Sieg Heil!". Especially under Frank, the teachers suffered harshly. In the first six months of 1944, about 1,000 Czech teachers were either executed or imprisoned. By 1945, about 5,000 Czech teachers were imprisoned in the concentration camps, where a fifth died. By the end of the occupation, about 40% of all Czech teachers had been fired with the figure reaching 60% in Prague.

== Administrative subdivisions ==
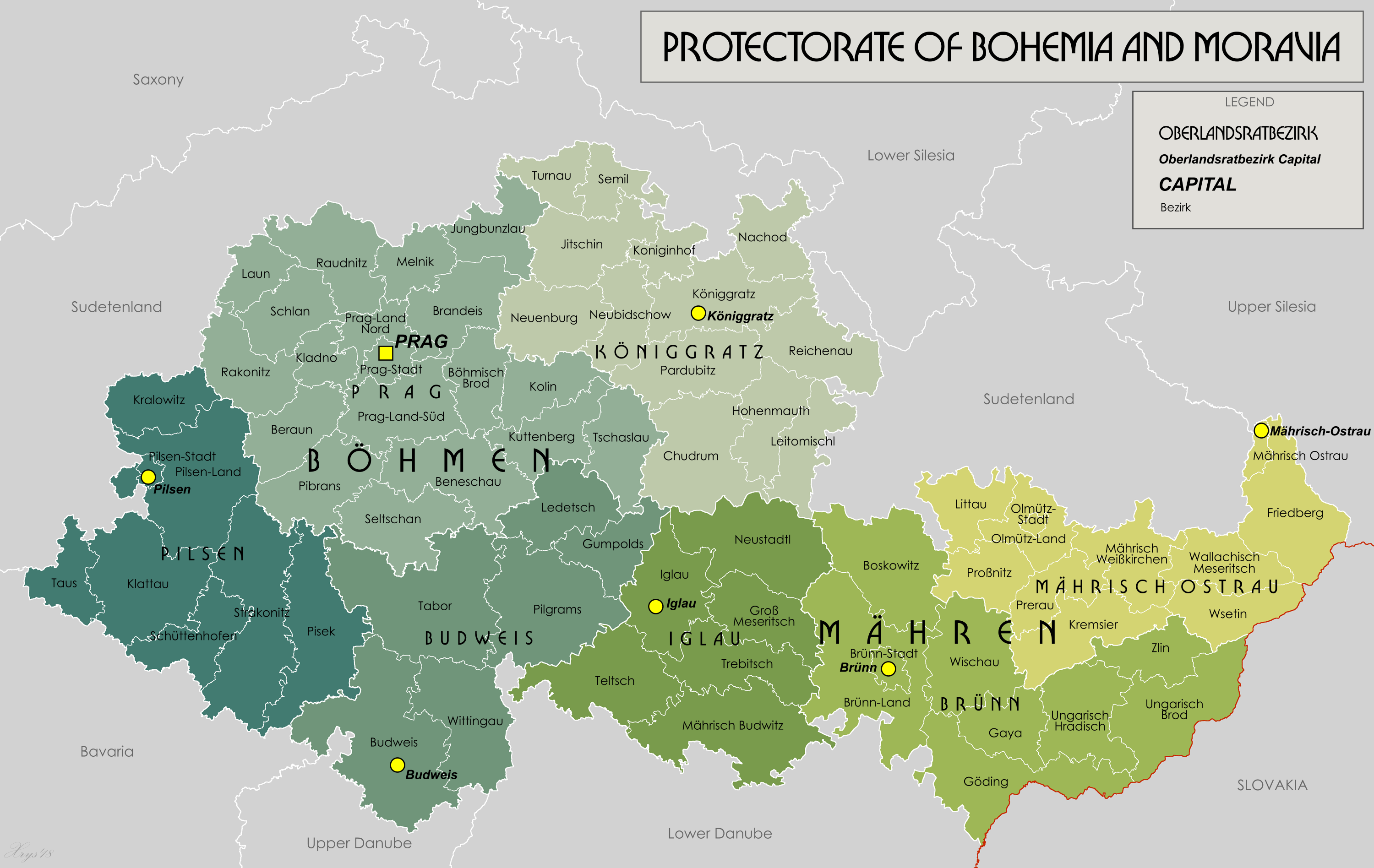
Protectorate of Bohemia and Moravia

=== Protectorate districts ===
For administrative purposes the Protectorate of Bohemia and Moravia was divided into two Länder: Böhmen (Bohemia) and Mähren (Moravia). Each of these was further subdivided into Oberlandratsbezirke, each comprising a number of Bezirke.

Böhmen
Budweis	Budweis, Gumpolds, Ledetsch, Pilgrams, Tabor, Wittingau
Königgrätz	Chrudim, Hohenmauth, Jitschin, Königgrätz, Königinhof, Leitomischl, Nachod, Neu-Bidschow, Neuenburg, Pardubitz, Reichenau, Semil, Turnau
Pilsen	Klattau, Kralowitz Pilsen-Land, Pilsen-Stadt, Pisek, Schüttenhofen, Strakonitz, Taus
Prag	Beneschau, Beraun, Böhmisch-Brod, Brandeis, Jungbunzlau, Kladno, Kolin, Laun, Melnik, Pibrans, Prag-Land-Nord, Prag-Land-Süd, Prag-Stadt, Rakonitz, Raudnitz, Schlan, Seltschan, Tschaslau
Mähren
Brünn	Boskowitz, Brünn-Land, Brünn-Stadt, Gaya, Göding, Ungarisch-Brod, Ungarisch-Hradisch, Wischau, Zlin
Iglau	Groß-Meseritsch, Iglau, Mährisch-Budwitz, Neustadtl, Trebitsch
Mährisch-Ostrau	Friedberg, Kremsier, Littau, Mährisch-Ostrau, Mährisch-Weißkirchen, Olmütz-Land, Olmütz-Stadt, Prerau, Proßnitz, Wallachisch-Meseritsch, Wesetin

=== NSDAP districts ===
For party administrative purposes the Nazi Party extended its Gau system to Bohemia and Moravia when the Protectorate was established. This step divided the remaining parts of Bohemia and Moravia up between its four surrounding Gaue:

- Reichsgau Sudetenland
- Gau Bayreuth (Bavarian Eastern March)
- Reichsgau Niederdonau (Lower Danube)
- Reichsgau Oberdonau (Upper Danube)

The resulting government overlap led to the usual authority conflicts typical of the Nazi era. Seeking to extend their own powerbase and to facilitate the area's Germanization the Gauleiters of the surrounding districts continually agitated for the liquidation of the Protectorate and its direct incorporation into the German Reich. Hitler stated as late as 1943 that the issue was still to be decisively settled.

== Military commander ==
Like in other occupied countries, the German military in Bohemia and Moravia was commanded by a Wehrmachtbefehlshaber. Through the year, the headquarter received several different names because of the complex structure of the Reichsprotektorat: Wehrmachtbevollmächtigter beim Reichsprotektor in Böhmen und Mähren, Wehrmachtbefehlshaber beim Reichsprotektor in Böhmen und Mähren and Wehrmachtbefehlshaber beim deutschen Staatsminister in Böhmen und Mähren. The commander also held the position of the Befehlshaber im Wehrkreis Böhmen und Mähren.

=== Commanders ===
- General der Infanterie Erich Friderici (1 April 1939 – 27 October 1941)
- General der Infanterie Rudolf Toussaint (1 November 1941 – 31 August 1943)
- General der Panzertruppe Ferdinand Schaal (1 September 1943 – 26 July 1944) (arrested after the 20 July plot)
- General der Infanterie Rudolf Toussaint (26 July 1944 – 8 May 1945)

== Identity card of citizens ==
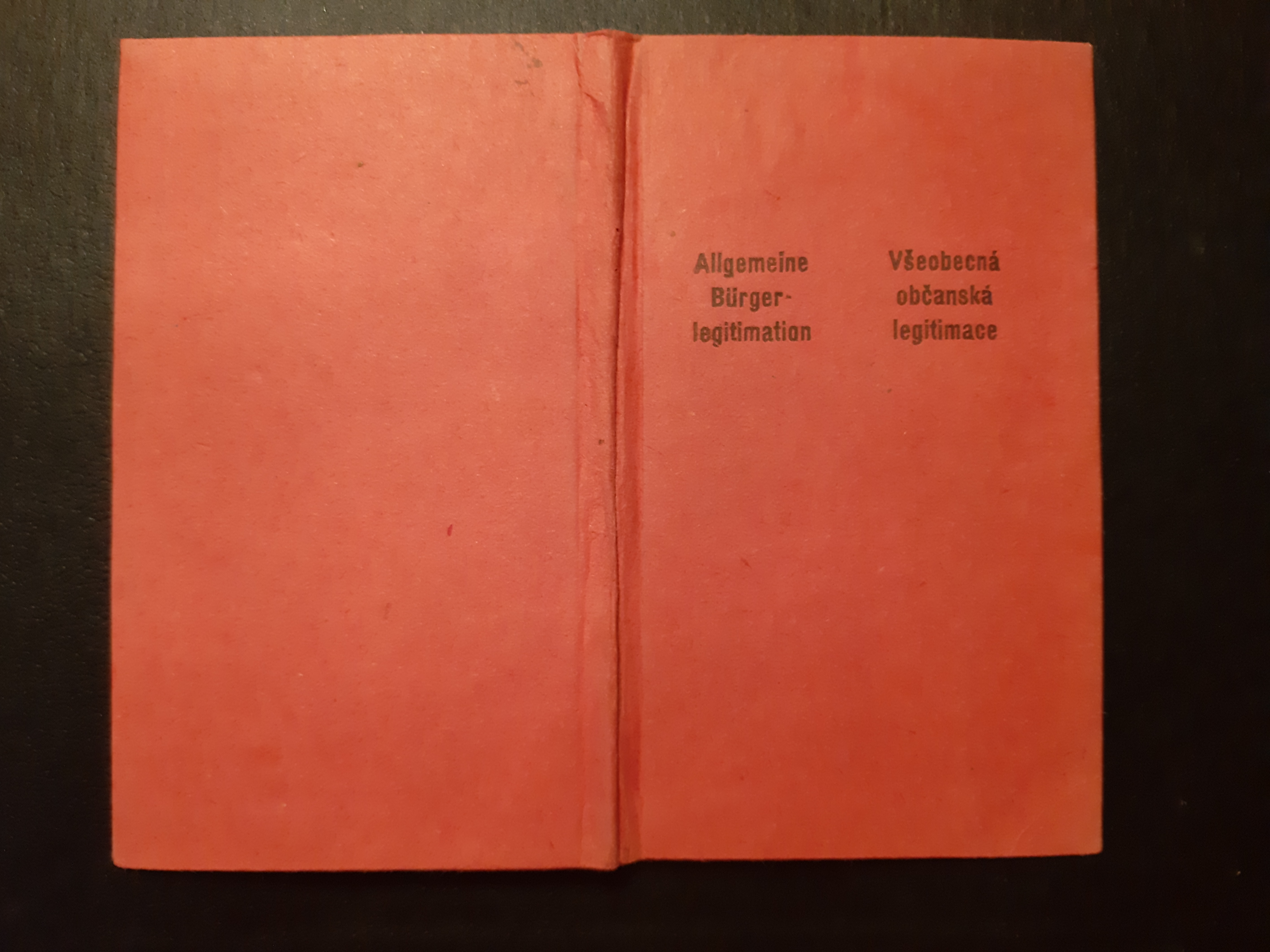

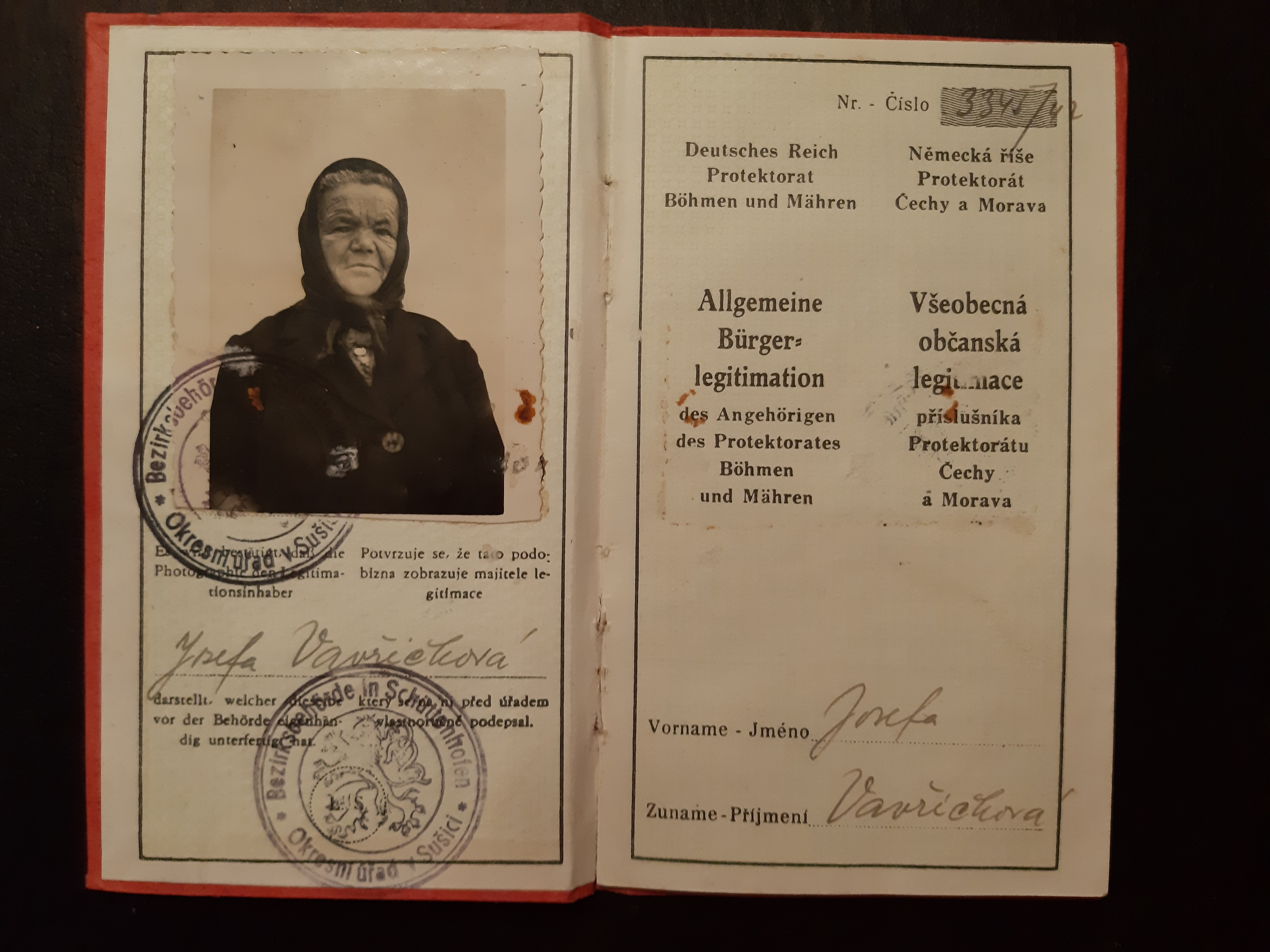

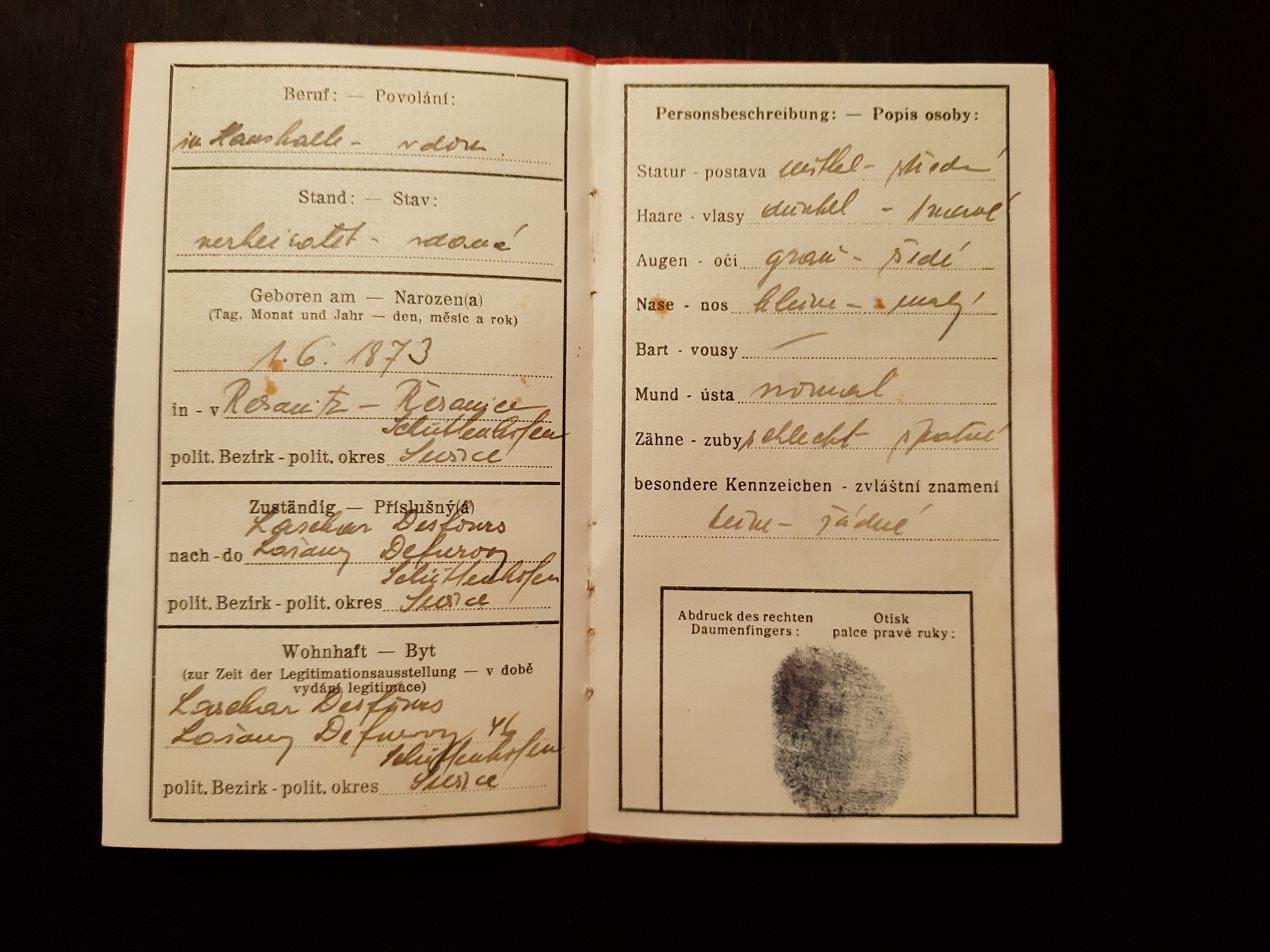

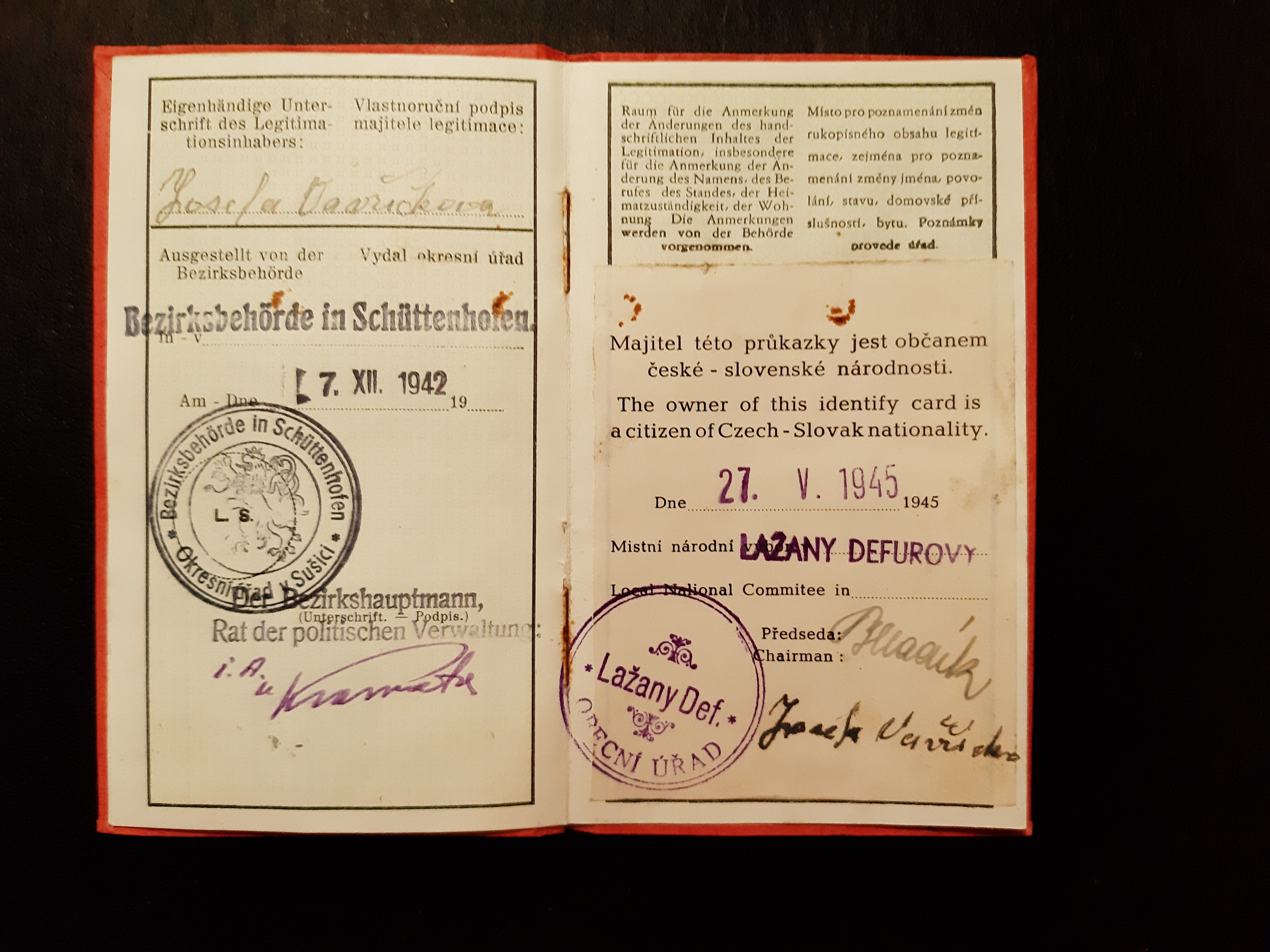

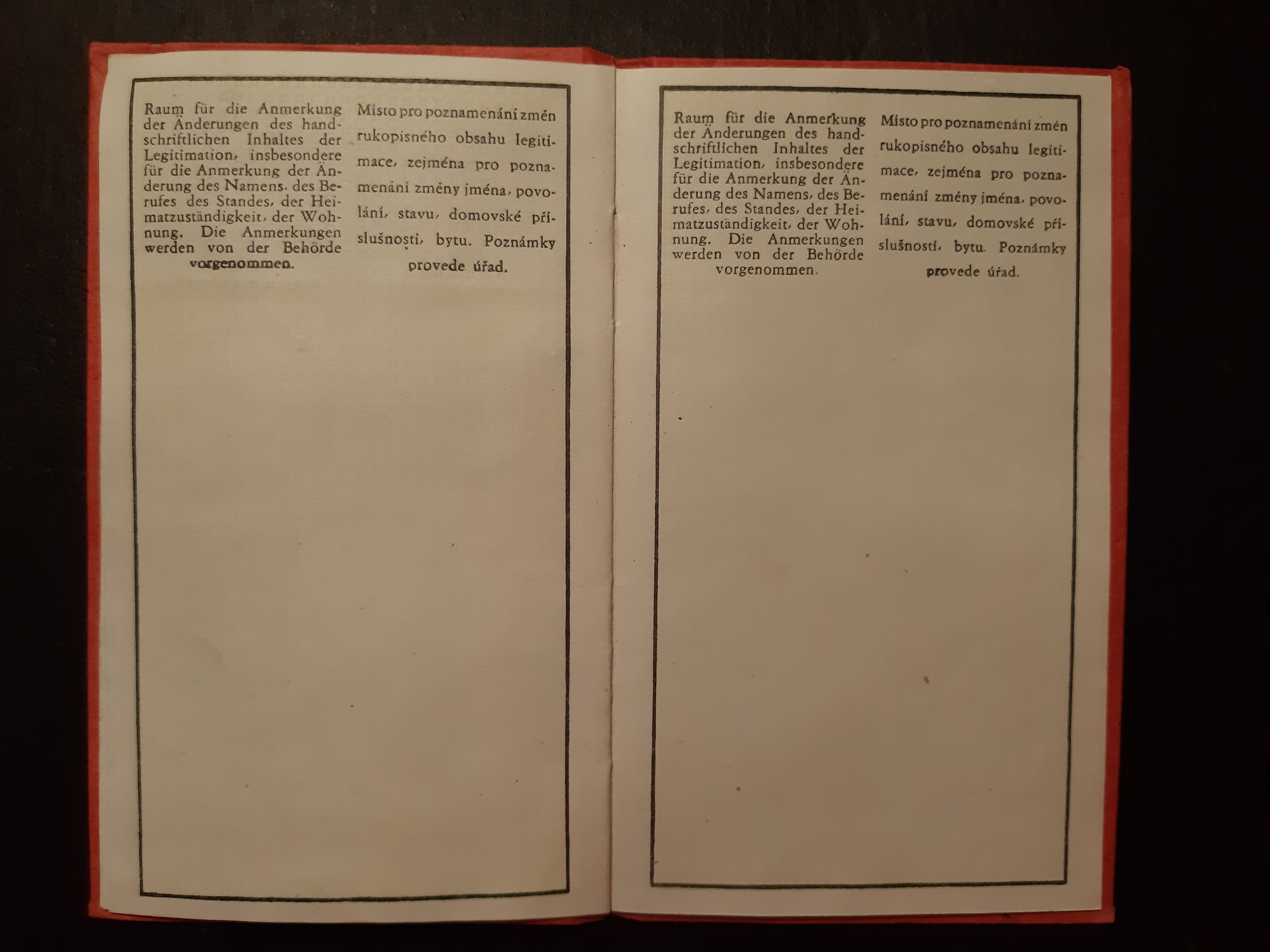

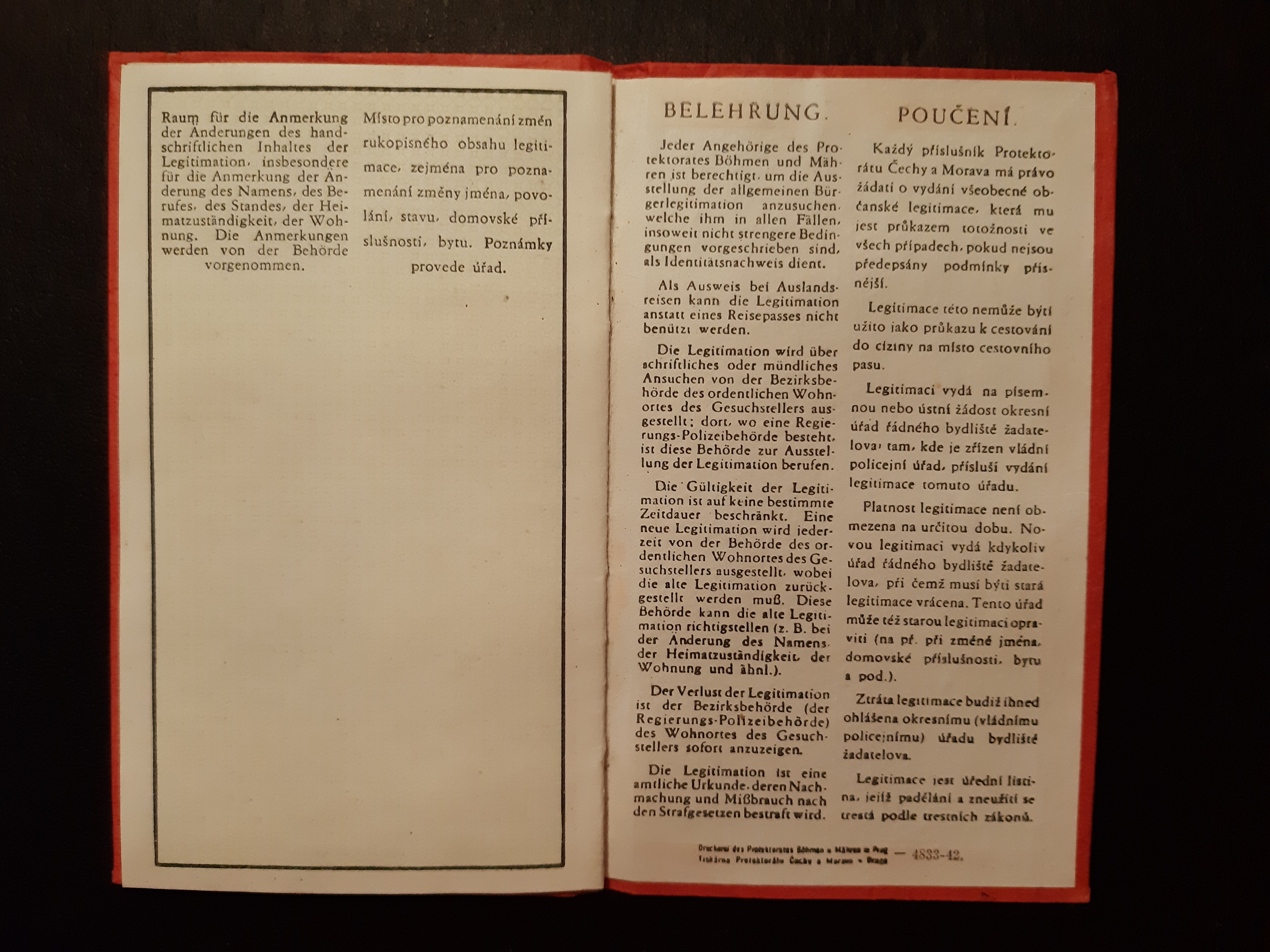

== See also ==
- Lists of political office-holders in the Protectorate of Bohemia and Moravia
- Government Army (Bohemia and Moravia)
- Occupation of Czechoslovakia (1938–1945)
- Areas annexed by Nazi Germany
- Prague offensive
- History of the Czech lands
- History of Slovakia
- Lety concentration camp
- Out Distance
- Slovak Republic (1939–1945)

== Bibliography ==
- Bryant, Chad Carl (2009). Prague in Black: Nazi Rule and Czech Nationalism. Cambridge, Mass: Harvard University Press. ISBN 978-0-674-03459-4.
- Gruner, Wolf; Osterloh, Jörg, eds. (2015). "Protectorate of Bohemia and Moravia". The Greater German Reich and the Jews: Nazi Persecution Policies in the Annexed Territories 1935-1945. Studies on war and genocide. Translated by Heise, Bernard. New York: Berghahn. ISBN 978-1-78238-443-4.
- Overy, Richard (1999). "Germany and the Munich Crisis: A Multilated Victory?". In Lukes, Igor; Goldstein, Erik (eds.). The Munich crisis, 1938: prelude to World War II. London; Portland, OR: Frank Cass. pp. 191–215. ISBN 978-0-7146-4995-5.
- Miller, Daniel (2005). "The Czech Republic". In Frucht, Richard C. (ed.). Eastern Europe: An Introduction to the People, Lands, and Culture. Santa Barbara, Calif: ABC-CLIO. pp. 203–283. ISBN 978-1-57607-800-6.
- Rothwell, Victor (2001). Origins of the Second World War. Manchester studies in modern history. Manchester: Manchester University Press. ISBN 978-0-7190-5958-2.
- Strobl, Gerwin (2000). The Germanic Isle: Nazi Perceptions of Britain. Cambridge: Cambridge University Press. ISBN 978-0-521-78265-4.
