= List of political office-holders in the Protectorate of Bohemia and Moravia =

Flag of Bohemia and Moravia

Coat of arms of Bohemia and Moravia

This is a list of political office-holders in the Protectorate of Bohemia and Moravia, which from 15 March 1939 until 9 May 1945 comprised the Nazi-occupied parts of Czechoslovakia.

The list include both the representatives of the Nazi-recognized Czech authorities as well as the German Reichsprotektoren ("Reich protectors") and the Staatsminister ("State Minister"), who held the real executive power in the Protectorate of Bohemia and Moravia.

== Government of the Protectorate ==
Note: State President (Státní prezident / Staatspräsident) Emil Hácha and Prime Minister (Předseda vlády / Premierminister) Rudolf Beran held the office prior the German occupation, during the Second Czechoslovak Republic, and were officially confirmed in those positions (with very limited sovereignty and power) by German authorities within few days after the occupation.

=== State President of Bohemia and Moravia ===
No.	Portrait	Name (Lifespan)	Tenure			Political affiliation	Elected	Ref.
No.	Portrait	Name (Lifespan)	Took office	Left office	Duration	Political affiliation	Elected	Ref.
1		Emil Hácha (1872–1945)	16 March 1939	9 May 1945 (Note: Since May 1944, officially represented by prime ministers.)	6 years, 54 days	National Partnership	– (Note: Previously elected as Czechoslovak president in 1938.)	

=== Prime Ministers of Bohemia and Moravia ===
No.	Portrait	Name (Lifespan)	Tenure			Political affiliation	Cabinet	Ref.
No.	Portrait	Name (Lifespan)	Took office	Left office	Duration	Political affiliation	Cabinet	Ref.
–		Rudolf Beran (1887–1954); Acting	16 March 1939	27 April 1939	42 days	National Partnership	Beran II	
1		Alois Eliáš (1890–1942)	27 April 1939	27 September 1941 (Note: Arrested because of his participation in the anti-Nazi resistance.)	2 years, 153 days	National Partnership	Eliáš	
–		Jaroslav Krejčí (1892–1956)	28 September 1941	19 January 1942	113 days	National Partnership	Eliáš	
2		Jaroslav Krejčí (1892–1956)	19 January 1942	19 January 1945	3 years	National Partnership	Krejčí	
3		Richard Bienert (1881–1949)	19 January 1945	5 May 1945 (Note: Arrested by the Czech resistance at the start of the Prague uprising.)	106 days	National Partnership	Bienert	

== German representatives ==
=== Supreme Commander of the Wehrmacht in Bohemia and Moravia ===
No.	Portrait	Name (Lifespan)	Tenure			Military affiliation	Ref.
No.	Portrait	Name (Lifespan)	Took office	Left office	Duration	Military affiliation	Ref.
1		General der Infanterie; Johannes Blaskowitz (1883–1948)	15 March 1939	18 March 1939	3 days	Wehrmacht (German Army)	

=== Reich Protectors of Bohemia and Moravia ===
^{†} Died in office

No.	Portrait	Name (Lifespan)	Tenure			Political affiliation	Cabinet	Ref.
No.	Portrait	Name (Lifespan)	Took office	Left office	Duration	Political affiliation	Cabinet	Ref.
1		Konstantin von Neurath (1873–1956) (Note: Raised to the honorary rank of an SS-Obergruppenführer on 21 June 1943.)	21 March 1939	24 August 1943	4 years, 156 days	Nazi Party	Hitler	
–		SS-Obergruppenführer; Reinhard Heydrich (1904–1942); Acting	29 September 1941	4 June 1942^{[†]} (Note: Incapacitated since 27 May 1942.)	248 days	Nazi Party	–	
–		SS-Oberst-Gruppenführer; Kurt Daluege (1897–1946); Acting	5 June 1942	24 August 1943	1 year, 80 days	Nazi Party	–	
2		Wilhelm Frick (1877–1946)	24 August 1943	8 May 1945 (Note: Fled at the end of the Prague uprising.)	1 year, 257 days	Nazi Party	Hitler	

=== State Minister for Bohemia and Moravia ===
On 20 August 1943, at the eve of Wilhelm Frick's appointment, the State Ministry for Bohemia and Moravia was created within the Hitler cabinet, which assumed many powers of the Prime Minister and of the Reich Protector. SS-Obergruppenführer Karl Hermann Frank, Higher SS and Police Leader (Höherer SS-und Polizeiführer, HSSPF, HSS-PF, HSSuPF) in Bohemia and Moravia and the former Secretary of State in the Office of Reich Protector since 1939, was the only State Minister (with the title Staatsminister im Range eines Reichsministers) for Bohemia and Moravia, reducing the formerly important position of Reich Protector to a ceremonial role.

No.	Portrait	Name (Lifespan)	Tenure			Political affiliation	Cabinet	Ref.
No.	Portrait	Name (Lifespan)	Took office	Left office	Duration	Political affiliation	Cabinet	Ref.
1		SS-Obergruppenführer; Karl Hermann Frank (1898–1946)	20 August 1943	8 May 1945	1 year, 261 days	Nazi Party	Hitler	

== Governmental standards ==
Service flag of the Reich Protector
(1939–1944)

Service flag of the Reich Protector
(1944–1945)

Service flag of the State Minister for Bohemia and Moravia
(1944–1945)

Service flag of the Representative of the Wehrmacht in Bohemia and Moravia (1939–1945)

Standard of the State President

== See also ==
- List of presidents of Czechoslovakia
- List of prime ministers of Czechoslovakia
