= Emil Hácha =

Czechoslovak politician (1872–1945)

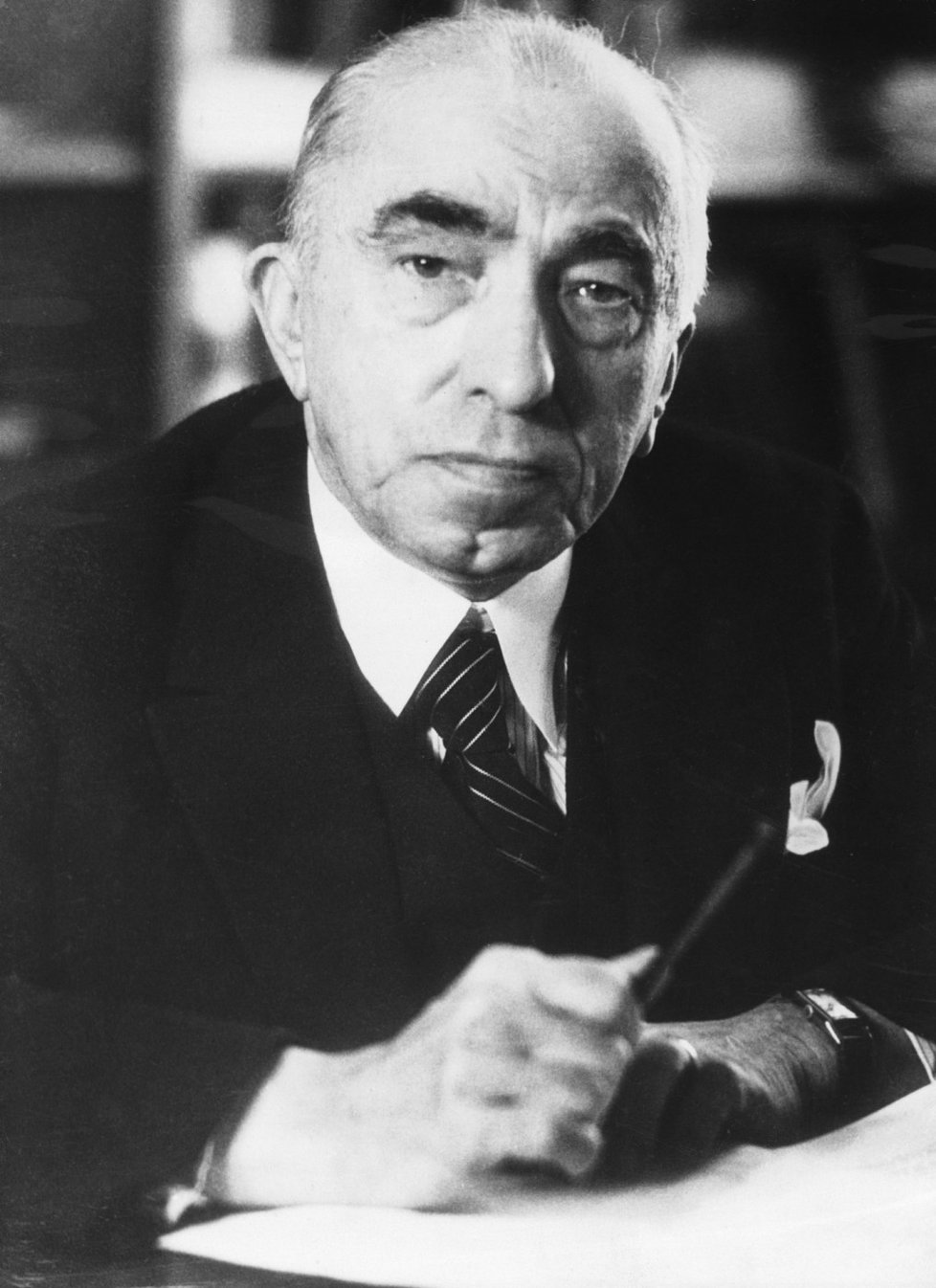
- Hácha c. 1940s

State President of Bohemia and Moravia
- In office 16 March 1939 – 9 May 1945
- Prime Minister: Rudolf Beran (acting, 1939); Alois Eliáš (1939–41); Jaroslav Krejčí (1941–45); Richard Bienert (1945)

President of Czechoslovakia
- In office 30 November 1938 – 14 March 1939
- Prime Minister: Jan Syrový (1938); Rudolf Beran (1938–39)
- Preceded by: Edvard Beneš
- Succeeded by: Edvard Beneš

Personal details
- Born: 12 July 1872 Trhové Sviny, Bohemia, Austria-Hungary
- Died: 27 June 1945 (aged 72) Prague, Czechoslovakia
- Resting place: Vinohrady Cemetery
- Party: National Partnership
- Spouse: Marie Klausová (m. 1902; died 1938)
- Education: University of Prague
- Profession: Lawyer
- Emil Hácha's voice Speech by Emil Hácha after the Nazi invasion of Czechoslovakia (recorded March 16, 1939)

Emil Dominik Josef Hácha (Czech pronunciation: [ˈɛmɪl ˈɦaːxa]; 12 July 1872 – 27 June 1945) was a Czech lawyer, serving as the president of Czechoslovakia from November 1938 to March 1939. In March 1939, after the breakup of Czechoslovakia, Hácha was the nominal president of the newly proclaimed German Protectorate of Bohemia and Moravia.

== Early life and legal career ==
Emil Hácha was born on 12 July 1872 in the South Bohemian town of Trhové Sviny.

He graduated from a secondary school in České Budějovice and then applied for the law faculty at the University of Prague. After finishing his studies in 1896 (JUDr.) he worked for the Country Committee of the Kingdom of Bohemia in Prague (a self-government body with quite limited power). In 1902, Hácha married Marie Klausová (1873–1938). They had a daughter, Milada. Marie died ten months before Hácha became president.

Shortly after the outbreak of World War I, he became a judge at the Supreme Administrative Court in Vienna (the court was responsible for Cisleithania). He met Ferdinand Pantůček there. After the Treaty of Versailles, Pantůček became President of the Supreme Administrative Court of the Republic of Czechoslovakia in Prague, and Hácha became a judge (1918) and Deputy President (1919) of the court.

After Pantůček's death in 1925, he was chosen by T. G. Masaryk as his successor, becoming first President of the Supreme Administration Court.

He became one of the most notable lawyers in Czechoslovakia, a specialist in English common law and international law. He was also a translator of English literature (most notably Three Men in a Boat by Jerome K. Jerome), collector of art and a poet. His book Omyly a přeludy (Errors and Delusions) was published in 1939 anonymously, then later under his own name in 2001. He also became a member of the Legislative Council.

== President of Czechoslovakia ==
=== Second Czechoslovak Republic ===
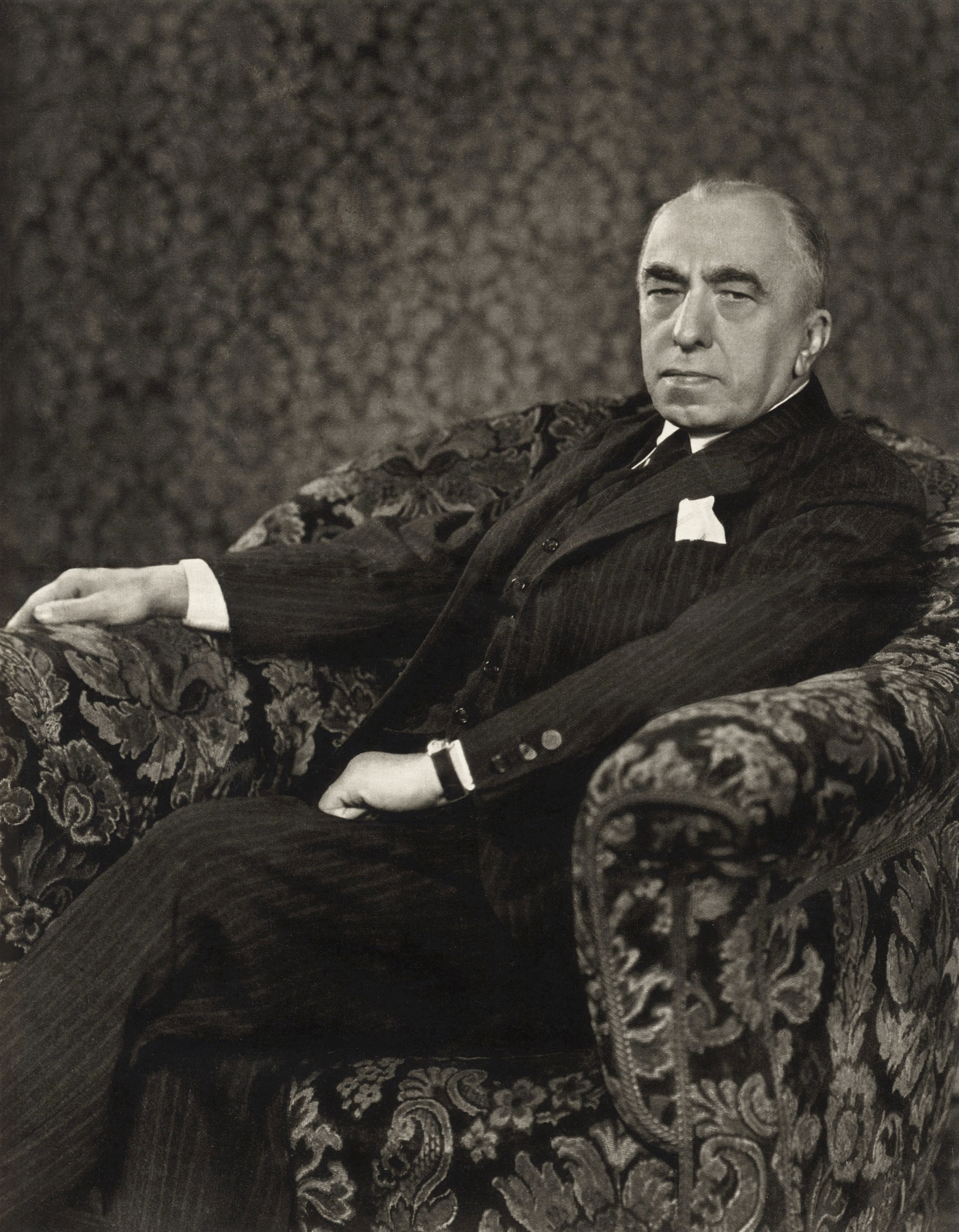
Hácha as president of the Second Czechoslovak Republic, 1938

Following the Munich Agreement, Hácha was nominated as successor to Edvard Beneš on 30 November 1938 as President of Czechoslovakia. He was nominated because of his Catholicism, conservatism and lack of involvement in any of the governments that had led to the partition of the country.

The short era of his presidency before the German occupation is known as the Second Czechoslovak Republic, and was marked by the shift from democracy to an authoritarian state with an enabling act giving previously unusual powers to the president and government and restricting the powers of the parliament.

After the secession of Slovakia and Ruthenia in March 1939, the British Ambassador to Czechoslovakia, Sir Basil Newton, advised President Hácha to meet Hitler. When Hácha first arrived in Berlin, he first met with the German Foreign Minister, Joachim von Ribbentrop, prior to meeting with Hitler. Von Ribbentrop testified at the Nuremberg trials that during this meeting Hácha had told him that "he wanted to place the fate of the Czech State in the Führer's hands."

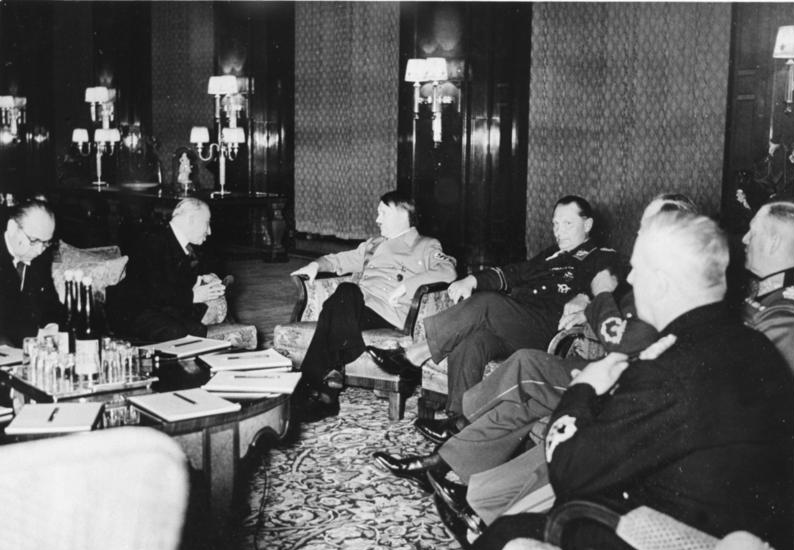
Hácha, Hitler and Göring meeting in Berlin, March 1939

In the evening of 14 March 1939, Hitler summoned President Hácha to the Reich Chancellery in Berlin. Hitler deliberately kept him waiting, while Hitler watched a film. Generalfeldmarschall Wilhelm Keitel, in his memoirs, recalled that when Hácha arrived, Hitler said that "he was going to let the old gentleman rest and recover for two hours," which was incomprehensible to Keitel. Finally, at 1:30 a.m., on 15 March 1939, Hitler saw the President. He told Hácha that as they were speaking, the German army was about to invade Czechoslovakia.

Hitler then gave the Czech President two options: cooperate with Germany, in which case the "entry of German troops would take place in a tolerable manner" and "permit Czechoslovakia a generous life of her own, autonomy and a degree of national freedom..." or face a scenario in which "resistance would be broken by force of arms, using all means." Minutes of the conversation noted that for Hácha this was the most difficult decision of his life, but believed that in only a few years this decision would be comprehensible and in 50 years would probably be regarded as a blessing. According to Joachim Fest, Hácha suffered a heart attack induced by Göring's threat to bomb the capital and by four o'clock he contacted Prague, effectively "signing Czechoslovakia away" to Germany. Göring acknowledged making the threat to the British ambassador to Germany, Sir Nevile Henderson, but said that the threat came as a warning because the Czech government, after already agreeing to German occupation, couldn't guarantee that the Czech army would not fire on the advancing Germans. Göring however does not mention that Hácha had a heart attack because of his threat.

The French Ambassador, Robert Coulondre, reported that according to an unnamed source considered reliable by Coulondre, by half past four, Hácha was "in a state of total collapse, and kept going only by means of injections." Coulondre described the scene at the Reich Chancellery:

"The German ministers [Göring and Ribbentrop] were pitiless. They literally hunted Dr. Hácha and M. Chvalkovsky round the table on which the documents were lying, thrusting them continually before them, pushing pens into their hands, incessantly repeating that if they continued in their refusal, half of Prague would lie in ruins from bombing within two hours, and that this would be only the beginning. Hundreds of bombers were waiting the order to take off, and they would receive that order at six in the morning if the signatures were not forthcoming".

However, Hitler's interpreter Paul Schmidt, who was present during the meeting, in his memoirs denied such turbulent scenes ever taking place with the Czechoslovak President. Jewish-American historian Jean Ancel noted that Schmidt's memoirs are not a reliable source of information as he consistently downplayed and ignored the criminal policies of the Nazi regime as well as his own role in them.

=== Protectorate of Bohemia and Moravia ===
After the occupation of the remnants of Czechoslovakia on 16 March, Hácha retained his office as President, but was forced to swear an oath to Hitler, who appointed Konstantin von Neurath as Protector of Bohemia and Moravia. During his time as President of the Protectorate, Hácha also signed into law legislation modeled after the Nazi Nuremberg Laws that discriminated against Czech Jews. He dissolved the parliament, replacing it with the National Partnership.

Hácha's situation changed on 29 September 1941, when Reinhard Heydrich was appointed Deputy Protector of Bohemia and Moravia, as Neurath had been considered not harsh enough by Hitler. Hácha lost all remaining influence over political affairs in his country and became a puppet. Many of his colleagues and friends were arrested (including the Prime Minister Alois Eliáš) and shot or sent to Nazi concentration camps.

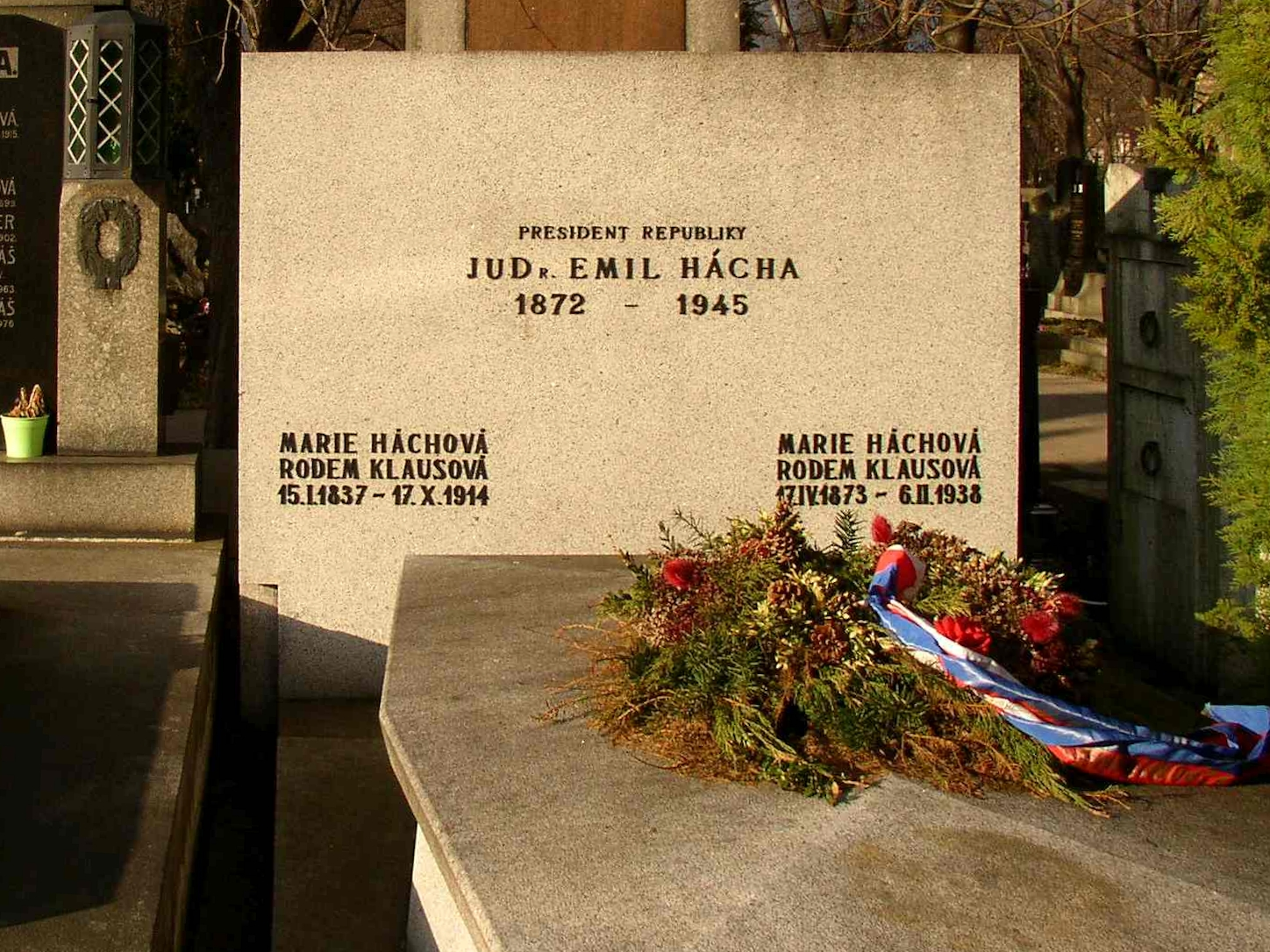
Hácha's grave at Vinohrady Cemetery

After the assassination of Heydrich, the new Deputy Protector became Kurt Daluege. Hitler had originally planned to murder 10,000 Czechs in reprisal for the murder of Heydrich and warned Hácha that if another such incident occurred, "we should have to consider deporting the whole Czech population". This threat was made at Heydrich's funeral.

=== Capture, torture, and death ===
On 9 May 1945, Prague was captured by the Red Army during the Prague offensive. Hácha was brutally beaten and arrested by NKVD agents on 13 May and transferred immediately to Pankrác Prison. He died in prison on 27 June 1945 under mysterious circumstances. After his death, he was buried at first in an unmarked grave at the Vinohrady Cemetery, although since at least 2005 there has been a marker present on his grave.

== See also ==
- List of unsolved deaths

== Citations ==
Political offices
Preceded by Edvard Beneš	President of Czechoslovakia; 1938–1939	Succeeded by Edvard Beneš
Preceded by Office created	State President of Protectorate of Bohemia and Moravia; 1939–1945	Succeeded by Office abolished
