= Alois Eliáš =

Czechoslovak general and politician (1890–1942)

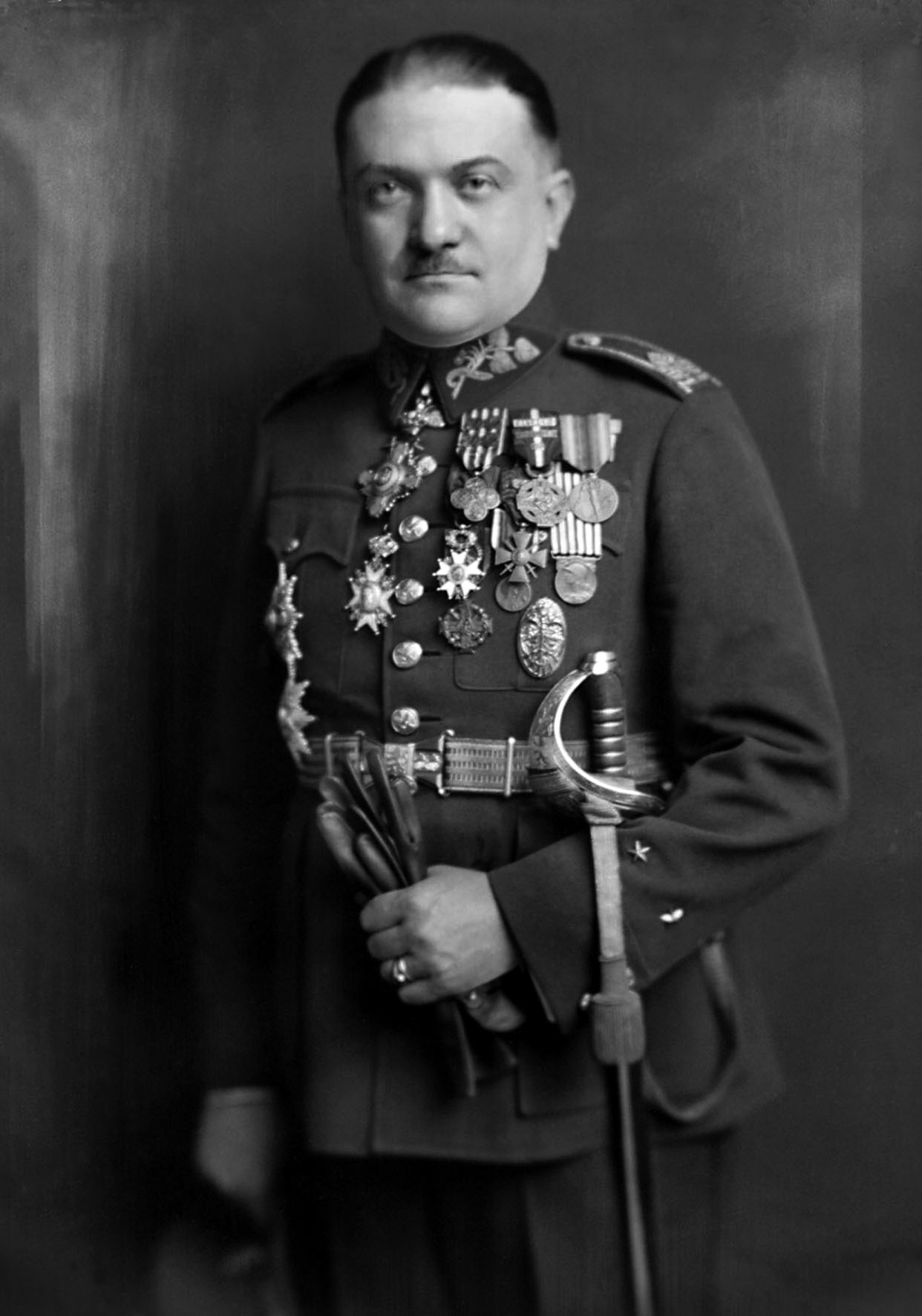
- Alois Eliáš on photo from Atelier Langhans Prague

Prime Minister of the Protectorate of Bohemia and Moravia
- In office 27 April 1939 – 27 September 1941
- President: Emil Hácha
- Preceded by: Rudolf Beran (acting)
- Succeeded by: Jaroslav Krejčí

Personal details
- Born: 29 September 1890 Prague, Kingdom of Bohemia, Cisleithania, Austro-Hungarian Empire
- Died: 19 June 1942 (aged 51) Kobylisy Shooting Range, Prague, Protectorate of Bohemia and Moravia
- Cause of death: Execution by firing squad
- Occupation: Army general and politician
- Awards: Croix de Guerre; Legion of Honour

Military service
- Branch/service: Austro-Hungarian Army (1914–1917); Czechoslovak Legion (1917–1920); Czechoslovak Army (1920–1939)
- Years of service: 1914–1939
- Rank: Army general
- Battles/wars: World War I; Battle of Verdun; Battle of the Aisne; Polish–Czechoslovak War; Hungarian–Czechoslovak War

Alois Eliáš (29 September 1890 – 19 June 1942) was a Czech general and politician. He served as prime minister of the puppet government of the German-occupied Protectorate of Bohemia and Moravia from 27 April 1939 to 27 September 1941 but maintained contact with the government-in-exile. Because of his participation in the anti-Nazi resistance, he was the only head of government who was murdered by the Nazis during World War II.

== Education ==
Eliáš graduated in geodesy from the Czech Technical University in 1911. Working for a private company as a land surveyor, he was sent to Bosnia to work on the construction of a railway.

== Military career ==
After the Austrian declaration of war on Serbia, Eliáš was called up for service with the Austro-Hungarian Army and was sent with the Prague 28th Infantry Regiment to Galicia. After only a few days, Eliáš was taken prisoner by the Russians on 28 August 1914 during the Galicia campaign.

In 1917, Eliáš learnt of the existence of Czechoslovak Legions, which he joined. They were volunteer armed forces fighting on the side of the Entente Powers during World War I (France, Britain, Italy, Russia) with the goal of winning the Allies' support for independence and were ultimately successful.

Eliáš was later dispatched to France, where he studied at the officer school at St Maixent, and was later assigned to the 21st Czechoslovak Regiment as a platoon commander. In the autumn of 1918, he took part in battles at Terron and on the Aisne. For his bravery and command skills, he was awarded the French Croix de Guerre and made a member of the Legion of Honour.

His studies in France significantly accelerated Eliáš's career after the war. In Prague, he became a general staff officer and was later promoted to brigadier general. As a military expert, he was a member of the Czechoslovak delegation at the World Disarmament Conference in Geneva. In 1936, he was promoted to general of division (the second-highest army rank) and became commander of the Vth Army Corps, in Trenčín. During the Second Czechoslovak Republic, he was appointed as minister of transportation and a member of the Supreme State Defence Council of Czechoslovakia.

== Prime minister ==
=== Appointment ===
The first government under the Protectorate of Bohemia and Moravia of Premier Rudolf Beran was only provisional as Beran had served as the last premier of the Second Czechoslovak Republic. Its replacement was discussed at the end of April 1939, with President Emil Hácha thinking Alois Eliáš would be a good choice for prime minister because the popularity that he had acquired during his earlier military career would legitimise the puppet regime. Although somewhat dubious, some historians have written that Hácha hoped that Eliáš's former contacts with Reichsprotektor Konstantin von Neurath could influence the Reichsprotektor on the desirability of Eliáš as prime minister.

=== Activities ===
On 25 March 1939, Adolf Hitler in a speech to all of the various state secretaries held at the Reich Ministry of the Interior stated that Jews should be "excluded" from the public life of the protectorate, but that this was "not the direct responsibility of the Reich" as the "Jewish question" in the protectorate would "develop on its own accord" with no involvement from the Germans. Upon being appointed premier by President Hácha on 27 April 1939, Eliáš was ordered to "intensely" prepare a set of antisemitic laws for the protectorate. Hácha believed it was desirable for the Czech government to introduce antisemitic laws on its own both to prove its loyalty to the Reich and to ensure that the assets owned by the Czech Jewish community, which were worth 20 billion crowns, be transferred over to Czechs rather than the Germans.

On 11 May 1939, Eliáš proposed to the Reichsprotektor, Neurath that Jews would be deprived of Protectorate citizenship and subject to various discriminatory measures. Under Eliáš's draft, Jews were to be completely excluded from the arts, education, the civil service, the courts, the corporations, and medicine. Notably, Eliáš in his draft defined Jewishness in terms of religion rather than race, and German officials objected to Eliáš's draft as far too moderate for their liking, complaining that there were too many loopholes and that any Jew could easily escape the measures by converting to Christianity. The Israeli historian Livia Rothkirchen wrote that Eliáš was an active Free Mason known for his Czech nationalism, and there is no evidence that he personally ascribed to antisemitism. On 21 June 1939, Neurath vetoed Eliáš's draft and instead imposed the Nuremberg Laws onto the Protectorate. In the same degree, Neurath gave himself exclusive authority on the question of "Aryanisation" in the protectorate. Eliáš submitted to Neurath a list of 1, 000 Czech Jews who had made notable contributions to public life, and asked the Reichsprotektor to give them exemptions from the antisemitic laws. Instead, Neurath vetoed every single name of the list.

Eliáš maintained contacts with the Czechoslovak government-in-exile, led by President Edvard Beneš. Eliáš's primary form of resistance was to encourage former soldiers and airmen of the Czechoslovak Army and Air Force to make their way to France or Britain to enlist in the Free Czechoslovak forces, which he assisted by issuing them with false papers that allowed them to travel abroad. In the summer of 1939, Eliáš began to exfiltrate former members of the Czechoslovak military to make their way to France while contacting the Czechoslovak National Committee. Eliáš corresponded with General František Moravec, the intelligence chief and then with President Beneš himself. One of the couriers for Eliáš was the American diplomat George F. Kennan, who was stationed at the American consulate in Prague. Kennan enjoyed diplomatic immunity, ensuring he could not be searched or arrested. Kennan later described Eliáš as like a character from the popular novel The Good Soldier Švejk, writing that Eliáš had "a boggling willingness to comply with any and all demands and an equally baffling ability to execute them in such a way that the effect is quite different from that contemplated by those who did the commanding." Jaromír Smutný, an aide to Beneš, recorded that Beneš had stated in a letter to Eliáš that "pro-German activities at home are most harmful".

In October–November 1939, students attending Charles University in Prague protested against the occupation, leading to Neurath to close all Czech language universities, deport a number of the students to concentration camps while having the leaders of the protests shot without trial. On 2 December 1939, Higher SS Police Leader Karl Hermann Frank gave a speech in the Old Town Square of Prague condemning the student protests and warned "The Czech government and the Czech leaders should abandon all ambiguity and double-talk." The demand that Eliáš condemn the student protests caused him much anguish, leading him to go to a sanatorium for the next few days as he pondered what to do. On 8 December 1939, Eliáš called a press conference with the German Press Bureau, where he stated "the only representative of the Czech people was the Protectorate government" and that his relations with Beneš were "clearly negative". Eliáš called for Germans and Czechs to work together in the war effort, which was in effect a repudiation of the students. The same day, Eliáš sent a message to Beneš declaring his loyalty to the government-in-exile and asked for his a priori consent "in such opportunistic political moves" on his part which would help with "evading national or economic disaster."

Eliáš's situation started to deteriorate after a wave of arrests of resistance members in 1940. Among his close contacts, the government minister Ladislav Feierabend fled to London. The Lord Mayor of Prague, Otakar Klapka, who was well informed about Eliáš's activities in support of families of exiled and arrested Czechs and secret messengers and contacts with Beneš in exile, was arrested and later executed. By January 1941, the Gestapo had accumulated damning evidence of Eliáš's involvement in the resistance. SS and Police Leader Karl Hermann Frank called for his arrest but was unsuccessful in having Eliáš removed. By this point, Eliáš himself was planning to going to Belgrade and from there to flee to Britain. The invasion of Yugoslavia on 6 April 1941 put an end to these plans.

After the invasion of the Soviet Union, code name Operation Barbarossa, was launched on 22 June 1941, there was an increase in resistance in the protectorate, mostly in the form of sabotage of weapons meant for the Wehrmacht. Eliáš started to meet in public in various parks and cemeteries with Milan Reiman, a courier for the Central Committee of the illegal Communist Party of Czechoslovakia.

On 26 July 1941, Beneš sent a message from London that ordered Eliáš and the rest of his cabinet to resign as Beneš wrote "Let them create a Quisling government" and "Let them abolish the Protectorate, it would be all the same." In his last message to Beneš on 7 August 1941 Eliáš refused to resign, but promised that he would resign "in case the Germans would try to impose new burdens, unbearable to the nation."

=== The sandwich affair ===
In early September 1941, Eliáš lost patience with several collaborationist journalists. Eliáš officially invited them to the Office of the Government and planned to poison them. With the help of his urologist, Miloš Klika, sandwiches were laced with botulism toxin, tuberculosis-causing Mycobacterium tuberculosis, and typhus-causing Rickettsia bacteria. On 18 September 1941, the invited journalists ate the poisoned sandwiches. Karel Lažnovský, the pro-Nazi editor of the journal České slovo, was the only fatality. Other journalists, including Jaroslav Křemen and Emanuel Vajtauer, fell ill.

Although Eliáš handled the sandwiches, he did not fall ill. Though the Sandwich Affair was investigated by the Gestapo, Eliáš was not charged and remained in office.

== Arrest and execution ==
On 27 September 1941, two days before the appointment of Heydrich as the new Reichsprotektor, Eliáš was arrested, put on trial and sentenced to death. At his trial, Eliáš speaking in the third person stated: "... he [Eliáš] found himself in a dilemma while having to choose between the moral imperative of humanity [Menschlichkeit] and the interests of the Reich. He thus decided to harm the Reich". While awaiting his execution, Eliáš had a letter smuggled out of the prison to his wife that declared: "Zvítězíme!" ("We shall prevail!") Eliáš was executed at the Kobylisy Shooting Range on 19 June 1942. During Eliáš's time on death row, Heydrich was assassinated by the Czechoslovak resistance.

== Legacy ==
Over 60 years later, Eliáš was given a state funeral with full honours on 7 May 2006 and was buried at the National Monument in Vitkov, Prague.

The Czech philosopher Jiří Přibáň and the Czech journalist Karel Hvíždala argued that in the Czech memory of the past, there is a tendency to focus more on the Czechs as the victims of others rather than as actors in the story of their history. Přibáň and Hvíždala wrote that in the Czech memory of World War Two, the defining episode was the Lidice massacre of June 1942 while the story of Eliáš tends by contrast to be neglected. Přibáň and Hvíždala maintained that Eliáš showed extraordinary courage and managed to lessen at least some of the burden of the occupation, but that his story is neglected because while "...the Czech nation has heroes, but it is not so fond of them because it prefers victims".

Government offices
Preceded by Rudolf Beran	Prime Minister of Protectorate Bohemia and Moravia; 1939–1941	Succeeded by Jaroslav Krejčí
