= Josef Pfitzner =

German politician and writer (1901–1945)

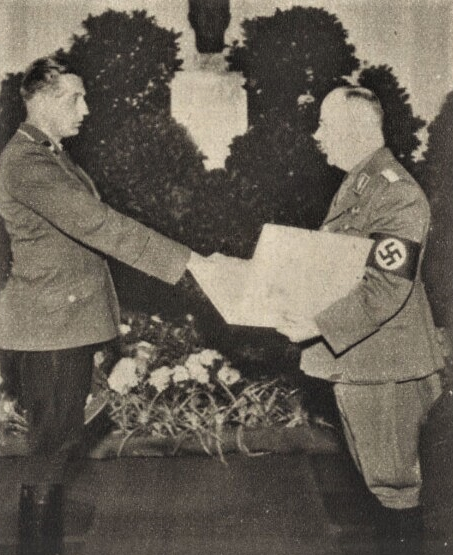
- Josef Pfitzner (right) with František Teuner (Chairman of the Board of Trustees), 1944
- Born: 24 March 1901; Petrovice, Austria-Hungary
- Died: 6 September 1945 (aged 44); Nusle, Czechoslovakia
- Education: Charles University
- Occupations: politician, writer

Josef Pfitzner (24 March 1901 – 6 September 1945) was a politician of Nazi Germany and a writer. He held the rank of SA-Standartenführer in the Sturmabteilung (SA). Pfitzner was publicly executed in Prague after World War II for speaking in favour of the Nazis, taking part in Nazi organisations, and defrauding the city of Prague in financial deals with the Germans.

== Life ==
Pfitzner was born in Petersdorf, Austrian Silesia. He was a German historian and politician and was professor of medieval and Eastern European history at the German University of Prague. Early on, he was attracted to Nazism and belonged to the branch of Austrian Nazism.

He held the rank of SA-Standartenführer in the Sturmabteilung. In 1939, he became the German deputy mayor of Prague and held this office until May 1945. Pfitzner was publicly executed in Prague after World War II within three hours of being convicted for speaking in favour of the Nazis, taking part in Nazi organisations, and defrauding the city of Prague in financial deals with the Germans. He was hanged in front of 50,000 spectators.

== Work ==
Pfitzner took a special interest in the Sudeten German past and published Volkstumsschutz und Nationale Bewegung. Pfitzner wrote that the National Socialism of Germany was "the synthesis of the two great dynamic powers of the century, of the socialist and national idea". This specific brand of German socialism was perfected in the German borderlands of Austria and especially in the Sudetenland before it came to Germany. His views on the essentially German character of Bohemia and Moravia influenced Reinhard Heydrich during his time as Reich Protector; see R. Gerwarth, Hitler's Hangman: the life of Heydrich (2011), p. 266 with n. 220. However, it was Heydrich's influence that contained Pfitzner's further career; the Protector considered the deputy mayor - a man of words rather than deeds - to be unsuitable for a responsible position in the times of struggle.

== Writings ==
- Großfürst Witold von Litauen als Staatsmann (1930)
- Das Sudentendeutschtum (Cologne:Scharffstein, 1938)
- Volkstummsschutz und Nationale Bewegung (Ethnic Preservation and National Movement: 1938)
- Das tausendjährige Prag (1940)
