= Jan Kapras =

Czech jurist and politician

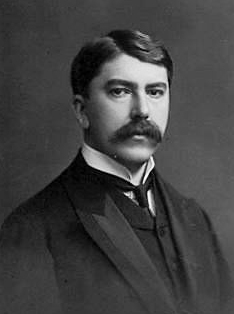

Minister of Education and National Enlightenment of Bohemia and Moravia
- In office 16 March 1939 – 19 January 1942
- Prime Minister: Rudolf Beran; Alois Eliáš
- Preceded by: Position established
- Succeeded by: Emanuel Moravec

Personal details
- Born: 17 January 1880 Brno, Moravia, Austria-Hungary
- Died: 13 May 1947 (aged 67) Nový Bydžov, Czechoslovakia
- Party: National Democracy; Party of National Unity; National Partnership
- Education: Charles University
- Occupation: politician, lawyer

Jan Kapras (17 January 1880 – 13 May 1947) was a Czech jurist and politician.

== Career ==
After studies in Innsbruck and Prague, he achieved habilitation in Bohemian legal history and was appointed professor at the University of Prague in 1910. He authored many works on Bohemian legal history, and substantially influenced the field with his principal work Právní dějiny zemí Koruny české (1913–1920).

After 1918, Kapras was mainly active in politics. Representing the National Democratic Party, he was elected senator in 1929 and held that office until 1935. From 1938 to 1939, he was minister of education in the last pre-war Czechoslovak government, and continued in that office in the German occupation government of the Protectorate of Bohemia and Moravia from 1939 to 1942. Suspected by the Gestapo, he was eventually dismissed from his office.
