= Betrayer (miniseries) =

2020 Czech television film

- Poster
- Written by: Josef Konás; Lucie Konásová
- Directed by: Biser A. Arichtev
- Starring: Marián Labuda Jr.
- Music by: Michal Novinski
- Country of origin: Czech Republic
- Original language: Czech
- No. of seasons: 1
- No. of episodes: 2

Production
- Producer: Vítězslav Jandák
- Running time: 166 Minutes

Original release
- Network: Czech Television
- Release: 26 April – 3 May 2020

Betrayer (Czech: Anatomie zrady, lit. 'Anatomy of Betrayal') is a 2020 Czech historical television miniseries directed by Biser A. Arichtev. It stars Marián Labuda jr. as Emanuel Moravec. It premiered on 26 April 2020 in Czech Television with second part being released on 3 May 2020. First part was viewed by 813,000 people.

== Cast ==
- Marián Labuda jr. as Emanuel Moravec
- Dana Droppová as Jolana
- Rebeka Poláková as Pavla Moravcová
- Filip Březina as Igor Moravec
- Oskar Hes as Jurij Moravec
- Jakub Barták as Pavlík Moravec
- Jiří Hána as Rudy
- Karel Hábl as Tomáš Garrigue Masaryk
- Viktor Preiss as Edvard Beneš
- André Hennicke as Karl Hermann Frank
- Ondřej Vetchý as Jaroslav Hrbek
- Vladimír Polívka as Walter Gretzki
- Jiří Vyorálek as Jan Rys-Rozsévač
- Ondřej Malý as Antonín Pešl
- Detlef Bothe as Reinhard Heydrich
