= František Teuner =

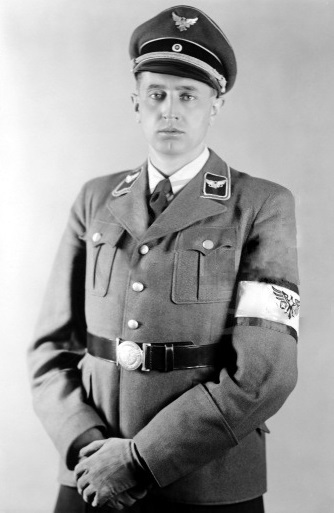
- Teuner in 1943
- Born: 6 March 1911; Benešov, Bohemia, Austria-Hungary
- Died: 25 June 1978 (aged 67); Nuremberg, West Germany
- Education: Charles University
- Occupation: Medical doctor

František Teuner (6 March 1911 – 25 June 1978) was a Czech medical doctor and a leader of the Board of Trustees for the Education of Youth ("Kuratorium") in the Protectorate of Bohemia and Moravia.

== Biography ==
Teuner studied at Charles University, receiving his medical degree in 1935, after which he went into the practice of medicine. While attending university, he joined the Vlajka. Following the German occupation of the Czech lands, Teuner resigned his membership in the Vlajka and eventually coordinated with Emanuel Moravec in the creation of the Kuratorium, becoming one of its principal leaders. Teuner became gradually disillusioned with his position in the Kuratorium due to the leading role German authorities took in its organization, a disillusionment amplified by his own lack of knowledge of the German language.

In 1945, with the Red Army quickly advancing on Prague, Teuner departed the capital for Plzeň. In 1947, he was tried in absentia and sentenced to death. He was arrested by United States forces in Munich in April 1947 and surrendered to the reconstituted Czechoslovak authorities who commuted his sentence from death to imprisonment; as an inmate he served as a prison doctor in Pankrác Prison and other facilities. He was released in 1963 and eventually moved to West Germany, where he continued the practice of medicine.

In 2021, Czech director Ondřej Veverka released a short film, Teuner, described as a psychological drama set in a prison where Teuner serves as a prison doctor. Veverka later directed a documentary for Czech Television, Kuratorium, about the board of trustees.
