= Betrayer (disambiguation) =

Betrayer is someone who has caused a betrayal. It also may refer to:

== Books ==
- Betrayer (novel), a novel by C. J. Cherryh
- The Betrayers, Matt Helm spy novel
- Betrayer, a novel in The Horus Heresy series by Aaron Dembski-Bowden

== Films and games ==
- Betrayer (film), a 2020 Czech film
- The Betrayer, a 1921 Australian-New Zealand film
- Betrayer (video game), a first-person action-adventure video game released in 2014

== Music ==
- Betrayer (Argentinian band), a female fronted groove metal band from Buenos Aires, Argentina, supplemented by Johan Liiva
