= National Idea =

Nationalist group from the Czech Republic

National Idea (Czech: Národní myšlenka) is a nationalist group in the Czech Republic that promotes Catholic integralist ideas by way of its journal National Idea: an Independent Journal of Conservative Nationalism.

== Origin ==
It was established in 2001 in Prague and is currently based in the town of Hodkovice nad Mohelkou. It is associated with Mladá pravice, a right-wing political party led by the Eurosceptic activist Lukáš Petřík which has a strong Internet presence.

== Components ==
The journal features political and economic essays and translations, interviews with right-wing groups and music and literary reviews. The journal has explored contemporary and historic strains of nationalist thought including the patriotic ideology of Czech philosopher František Mareš, the integralism of Charles Maurras and the revolutionary conservatism of Carl Schmitt and Ernst Jünger on the one hand; and the clerical fascism of Léon Degrelle, the paleoconservatism of Pat Buchanan and the antiliberalism of the European New Right on the other.
