= National Partnership =

Political party in the Protectorate of Bohemia and Moravia

National Partnership Národní souručenství Nationale Gemeinschaft
- Leader: Emil Hácha
- Founded: 21 March 1939; 87 years ago
- Dissolved: 4 June 1945; 81 years ago
- Merger of: Party of National Unity; National Labour Party
- Headquarters: Prague
- Youth wing: Curatorium for the Education of Youth
- Membership: 1,421,762 (Jan. 1940 est.)
- Ideology: Axis collaborationism
- Political position: Far-right
- Slogan: Vlasti zdar ("Success to the Homeland!")

The National Partnership (Czech: Národní souručenství, NS; German: Nationale Gemeinschaft) was the only authorised political movement for Czechs in the Protectorate of Bohemia and Moravia. It was created immediately after the German occupation of 15 March 1939 as a top-down mass organisation based on the Führerprinzip, with State President Emil Hácha at its apex. Its proclaimed aims were to “unify and encourage the Czech nation,” promoting national solidarity and loyalty to the Reich, social justice in the economic sphere, and youth education through the Youth of the National Partnership.

== Establishment ==
In a radio address on 16 March 1939, Hácha indicated that the existence of multiple political parties would no longer be permissible and called for complete national unification. On 21 March 1939 his political secretary Josef Kliment and chief of office Jiří Havelka presented a list of fifty proposed members for the new body’s committee, drawn across social groups—ten farmers, nine state employees, eight private clerks, seven traders and craftsmen, three lawyers, two professors, two physicians, two industrialists, two teachers, one priest, one architect and one private citizen—and across parties of the First Republic (agrarians, social democrats, people’s party, national democrats, national socialists, tradesmen’s party), plus representatives of Czech fascist groups (ANO, Vlajka, National Fascist Community and National Fascist Camp). Agrarian politician Adolf Hrubý was appointed by Hácha as leader.

On 22 March, the National Partnership’s committee was formed, and Hácha formally dissolved parliament (under the December 1938 Enabling Act and Hitler’s 16 March decree creating the Protectorate). The inaugural meeting took place at Prague Castle on 23 March 1939 in the presence of Hácha and Prime Minister Rudolf Beran. On 25 March, the committee debated “Jewish property” and the dissolution of parties (the National Labour Party, the Party of National Unity, and Czech fascist organisations). On 6 April 1939, the government confirmed the exclusivity of the National Partnership as the sole political movement for Czechs; the Nazi Party remained exclusively for Germans.

The National Partnership is the national political movement of the Czech people and the sole representative of the power-will of the Czech nation, created with the general consent of all the Czech people in the difficult political situation of spring 1939. Its task is to secure and lead the nation to all-round development according to the principles of national solidarity and national order. — Ottova encyklopedie nové doby (supplement to the Ottův slovník naučný)

== Organisation ==
From the outset an organisational and procedural statute was issued. The State President, as movement leader, could appoint and dismiss officials and overrule decisions across all components. The executive organ was the NS committee; the president appointed its chair as his deputy. The chair could convene meetings, set agendas, and create a narrower executive commission and multiple standing commissions, appointing and dismissing their heads and members. Alongside the central bodies, a territorial network was built—8 regions, 213 districts, and 8,043 local groups by late 1939—with regional and district leaders confirmed by Hrubý.

Membership of the central committee expanded during spring–summer 1939: on 17 May, Hácha appointed a seventy-member body (dismissing twelve, appointing thirty-two new); on 24 June, it again counted seventy-eight members. Each member swore an oath before Hrubý:

To serve the nation is the first duty of every Czech. I swear on my honour and conscience that I shall fulfil this duty and the will of the Leader of our nation, State President Emil Hácha. I shall follow the regulations valid in the territory of the Protectorate of Bohemia and Moravia. So help me God. — Venkov, no. 73, 23 March 1939

=== Commissions ===
On Hrubý’s initiative, numerous commissions were created; their number and remit changed over time. Contemporary lists included: workers’, finance, economic, youth, concentration of trade-union organisations, cultural, initiative, forestry, organisational, programme, industrial, self-government, social, private-employee, administrative, press, public-employee, health, agricultural, trades, concentrating, and executive commissions; later a liaison commission for relations with the NSDAP was added. Rules of procedure were issued for commission work.

=== Leadership changes ===
Hrubý was replaced on 26 October 1939 by Josef Nebeský, who was succeeded in May 1941 by Jan Fousek. After Reinhard Heydrich’s arrival and the subsequent terror following his assassination, competencies of the movement narrowed and it came under the Ministry of Education and Popular Enlightenment led by Emanuel Moravec. On 1 May 1942, Hácha abolished the committee and appointed Fousek as “central leader,” authorised to name up to three deputies, regional leaders, and at most fifteen expert commissioners; existing regional leaders remained in post. From October 1942, Tomáš Krejčí acted as commissioner-leader (he was arrested by the Gestapo in April 1945). On 3 March 1945, Hácha nominally reactivated activity and appointed retired General Robert Rychtrmoc as central leader; in April 1945, Karl Hermann Frank awarded him the golden Honorary Shield of the Protectorate of Bohemia and Moravia with the Wenceslas Eagle.

== Membership ==
Entry required proof of “Aryan” origin up to three generations; Jews and members of Masonic lodges were excluded. Initially, women were not allowed to join and were encouraged only to form auxiliary associations; following complaints, they were admitted from March 1940. The male age threshold was 21; youths aged 17–24 (later 15+) joined the Youth of the National Partnership (MNS). Persons convicted of “base and dishonourable” offences were barred. Members addressed each other as “brother” and “sister,” used the greeting Vlasti zdar! (“Success to the homeland!”), carried membership cards and wore badges (a women’s version was issued in January 1940). Fees were graduated by income: up to 10,000 K – 5 K; 10,000–15,000 K – 12 K; 15,000–20,000 K – 18 K; above 20,000 K – 0.1% of annual income; the poorest could pay 1 K.

== Mass recruitment (April–May 1939) ==
A centrally directed enrolment drive began with radio appeals by Hácha and proclamations by Hrubý. Applications were distributed house-to-house by “recruitment groups” (5–20 people drawn from teachers, firefighters and local notables), with temporary information offices to issue forms. From 23 April to 1 May 1939, teams collected completed forms door-to-door; many communities ended with bonfires and singing of the Czech anthem. Local press reported near-universal enrolment among adult men (e.g., 99.5% in the Jemnice judicial district), amid strong pressure and threats of consequences for “insufficient enthusiasm.” By January 1940 press figures claimed 1,421,762 members in Bohemia and 672,473 in Moravia; after admitting women and youth, total membership was propagandistically reported as 4,092,308 by the end of 1939. The territorial network allegedly comprised 6,524 local groups in Bohemia and 2,443 in Moravia, organised into 219 districts and 19 regions and staffed by more than 80,000 local functionaries.

== Youth ==
The MNS organised boys and girls (17–24, later 15+) for cultural, sporting, and social work in a strongly ideological framework. It ran the marriage fund “Mladí sobě” (“Young for Themselves”) and published the weekly List mladých (Young People’s Journal). In September 1939, the entry age was lowered; additional recruitment followed in autumn. Structures mirrored those of the main movement, led by chiefs at the regional, district, and local levels; Jews were excluded, and members used the same greetings and insignia. From 1942, youth work increasingly fell under the Board of Trustees for the Education of Youth (Kuratorium).

== Social and cultural work ==
Within its propaganda mission the NS created the association “Joy of Life” (modelled on Germany’s Kraft durch Freude) to organise convalescent stays and leisure for workers, farmers and the long-term unemployed intelligentsia (notably around Vlašim and Třeboň), and to run campaigns such as “Month of the National Song,” “Every Czech Once in Prague,” and the “Month of the National Badge,” the proceeds of which funded children’s holidays. Specialised sections included “Czech Family” (support for newlyweds), “Healthy Nation” (health vacations), and “Joy from Work” (workplace conditions). Nationwide “Days” promoted reconciliation, cleanliness and public health, including drives to reduce infant mortality and compulsory vaccination against diphtheria.

== Press and propaganda ==
From June 1939, the movement issued a central Bulletin. By committee decision, newspapers were subordinated to NS guidance; from 1 April 1939, all papers had to carry the subtitle “List Národního souručenství.” Jewish staff were removed from editorial and publishing offices. The committee issued thematic directives and assigned beats: Lidové noviny (foreign affairs), Národní politika (programmatic/ideological), Venkov (agriculture), Národní noviny and Národní listy (industry and trade), České slovo (labour questions), and Lidové listy (Catholic topics). Women’s magazines and other periodicals were placed under NS oversight.

== Relations with German authorities ==
The NS sought to present itself as the movement of the Czech people while demonstrating loyalty to the Reich. The initial stress on Czech patriotism elicited mixed German reactions—approval of authoritarian form, suspicion of overt national sentiment. The 17 May 1939 reconstitution of the seventy-member committee marked a “second stage” with heightened declarations of loyalty; right-wing extremists predominated. Leaflets explained the Protectorate, gave instructions for dealing with German authorities, and called for discipline, including establishing contact with local German leaders. After Hrubý’s departure, and especially under Moravec, the organisation further adapted to German demands and outwardly displayed loyalty to the occupation authorities.

== Shift to propaganda apparatus ==
Following the assassination of Heydrich in 1942, Emanuel Moravec gained dominant influence over propaganda. On 6 January 1943, delegates and regional officials endorsed commissioner-leader Krejčí’s thesis that the NS should not be a “political party in the sense of the outmoded principles of former parties,” but a corporation with chiefly cultural and educational tasks leading the nation toward “Reich consciousness” and a new order based on national solidarity and social justice. From 15 January 1943, the movement’s formal role was essentially that of a propaganda and mobilisation arm of Protectorate policy.

== Dissolution and legal aftermath ==
The organisation disintegrated during the liberation in spring 1945 and was formally dissolved by decree of the Czechoslovak Ministry of the Interior on 4 June 1945. Because membership had been broadly obligatory for adult Czech men, the National Partnership was not included on the November 1945 list of banned fascist and collaborationist organisations; mere membership was not prosecuted, unlike membership in groups such as Vlajka. Leading figures nevertheless faced trials before the National Court: Robert Rychtrmoc was condemned to death in January 1946; on 31 July 1946 Adolf Hrubý received life imprisonment; cases against Josef Nebeský, Jan Fousek and Tomáš Krejčí followed in 1947 with varying outcomes (Nebeský was acquitted in 1947 but sentenced by an extraordinary people’s court in December 1948 to 12 years; the Supreme Court in March 1992 quashed that ruling and reinstated the 1947 decision; Fousek and Krejčí were found guilty but initially not punished, then sentenced in absentia in December 1948 to 12 and 25 years respectively).

== Notable officials ==
- Alois Eliáš – Prime Minister (1939–1941)
- Ladislav Karel Feierabend – Minister of Agriculture (1939–1940)
- Jiří Havelka – Minister of Transport (1939–1941)
- Josef Ježek – Minister of the Interior (1939–1942)
- Jan Kapras – Minister of Education (1939–1942)
- Josef Kalfus – Minister of Finance (1939–1945)
- Jaroslav Krejčí – Minister of Justice; Minister President (1942–1945)
- Jindřich Kamenický – Minister of Transport (1941–1945)
- Walter Bertsch – Minister of Economy (1942–1945)
- Richard Bienert – Minister of the Interior; last Minister President (1945)
- Adolf Hrubý – Chairman (1939); Minister of Agriculture (1942–1945)
- Josef Nebeský – Chairman (1939–1941)
- Jan Fousek – Chairman/central leader (1941–1942)
- Tomáš Krejčí – Commissioner-leader (1942–1945)
- Emanuel Moravec – Minister of Education (1942–1945)
- Robert Rychtrmoc – Central leader (appointed March 1945)
