= Curatorium for the Education of Youth =

Youth organization in the Protectorate of Bohemia and Moravia

- Kuratorium pro výchovu mládeže
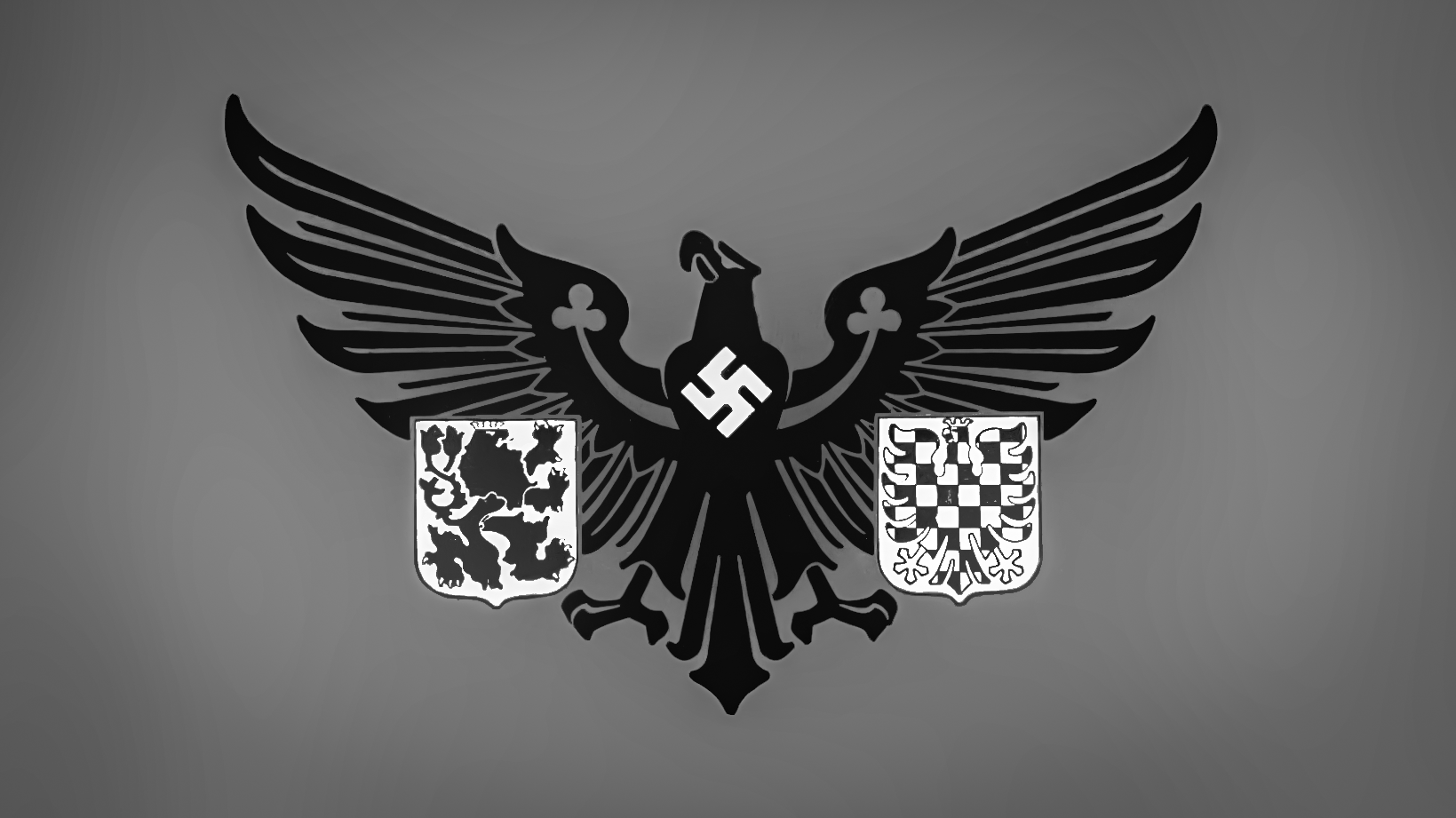
- Formation: 1941
- Dissolved: 1945
- Legal status: outlawed
- Headquarters: Prague
- Official language: Czech
- Key people: Emanuel Moravec, František Teuner

The Curatorium for the Education of Youth (Czech: Kuratorium pro výchovu mládeže) was an organization in the Protectorate of Bohemia and Moravia that provided athletic and cultural activities for youth ages ten to eighteen. Though created at the impetus of officials in the German-backed Protectorate government, it evolved to promote a distinctive form of "Reich-loyal" Czech nationalism that was viewed with concern by some quarters of the Nazi Party. Following World War II, it was banned as a fascist organization and its principal leaders put on trial.

== History ==
The Kuratorium was established in 1941 partly on the initiative of Colonel Emanuel Moravec to provide athletic and cultural activities for Czech youth between the ages of ten and 18. Many Kuratorium leaders were functionaries or supporters of the fascist Vlajka and Livia Rothkirchen has characterized its programming as an effort at Nazi indoctrination. #

However, Tara Zahra has noted that at the group's camping trips and other retreats for Czech boys and girls a special focus was made in celebrating Czech culture, with Sicherheitsdienst informants reporting to the German authorities that a kind-of "Reich-loyal" Czech nationalism was being organically developed by the Kuratorium.

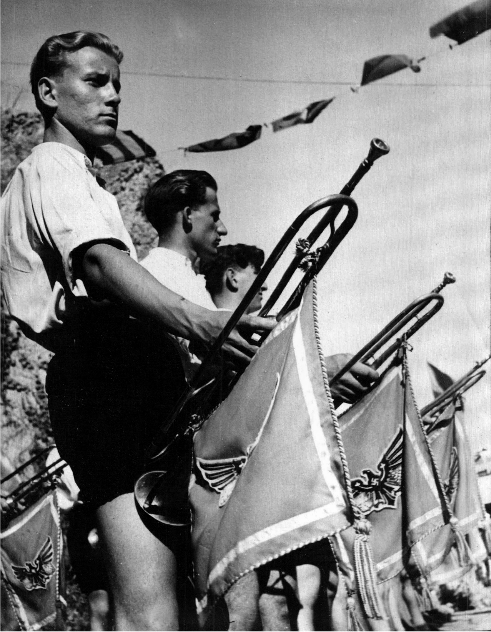
Kuratorium fanfare trumpeters pictured at the Week of Czech Youth in 1944.

Moravec was chair of the Kuratorium throughout its existence, while the organization was operationally managed by the Czech medical doctor František Teuner.

Following World War II, the Beneš decrees proscribed the Kuratorium as a "fascist organization". In 1947, leaders of the Kuratorium were tried over their involvement in the organization, resulting in the conviction of Teuner and seven others: Eduard Chalupa, Jan Svoboda, Josef Victorin, Karel Žalud, Jiri Málek, Vaclav Krigar, Jaroslav Krigar, and Karel Mihaliče.

Newsreel footage of a Kuratorium youth concert during the 1944 Week of Czech Youth

== Activities ==
According to a 1944 report in The Guardian, the Kuratorium was then putting on "180 theatrical shows a week. In Prague alone its concerts, films, and exhibitions are visited by 13,000 children every day. It has arranged 13 great sports meetings in which 30,000 boys and girls took part. It has taught 80,000 children to swim. Some 200,000 have actively participated in its 'Art for Youth' competition, and 20,000 have been entertained at free holiday camps".

The Kuratorium's nationalist-oriented programming reached a zenith in the summer of 1944 when the "Week of Czech Youth" was staged in Prague, activities during which included thousands of Kuratorium participants attired in Czech national costume singing traditional Czech songs. Observers from the Hitler Youth came to the conclusion that Kuratorium activities had essentially become nothing more than a continuation of the banned Sokol movement and were concerned that "Reich-loyal" Czech nationalism would transform into a dangerous "double-edged sword". On the one hand, the existence of the Kuratorium showcased Germany's supposed tolerance for Czech institutions and helped educate Czech youth towards an anti-communist worldview, however, on the other hand it severely undermined the ultimate goal of Germanizing the population of the Czech lands.

== See also ==
- National Partnership
- Pioneer movement
- Scouting
