= Reiner Schöne =

German actor (born 1942)

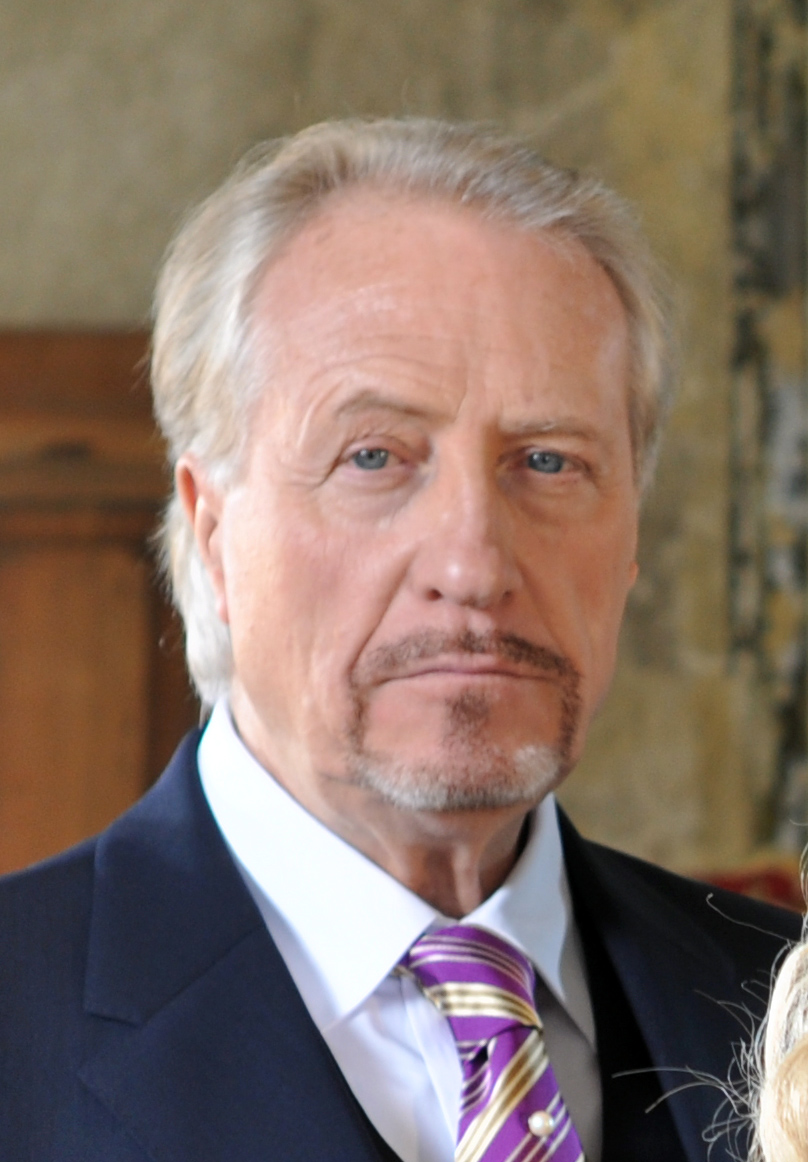
- Schöne in 2010
- Born: 19 January 1942 (age 84); Fritzlar, Germany
- Occupation: Actor
- Years active: 1957–present

Reiner Schöne (born 19 January 1942) is a German actor, known for television roles as Dukhat in the series Babylon 5, Esoqq in the Star Trek: The Next Generation episode "Allegiance", and Kolitar in the series Sliders, as well as film roles that include Karl Freytag in the Clint Eastwood thriller The Eiger Sanction, Shinnok in Mortal Kombat Annihilation, and Green Goblin and Optimus Prime in the German dubs of the live-action Spider-Man and Transformers film series respectively.

== Partial filmography ==
- Wir lassen uns scheiden (1968) - Körner
- 12 Uhr mittags kommt der Boß (1969) - Barmixer Lundas
- Return of Sabata (1971) - Clyde / Lieutenant
- Zwei himmlische Dickschädel (1974) - Vilmos
- The Eiger Sanction (1975) - Karl Freytag
- Change (1975) - Blasius Okopenki
- Anita Drögemöller und die Ruhe an der Ruhr (1976) - Horobin
- Der Winter, der ein Sommer war (1976, TV miniseries) - Hoym, Bandit
- Goetz von Berlichingen of the Iron Hand (1979) - Franz von Sickingen
- Return to Treasure Island (1986, TV series) - Van Der Brecken
- The Rebellion of the Hanged (1986)
- Amerika (1987, TV miniseries) - Major Helmut Gurtman
- The Gunfighters (1987, TV film) - Dutch Everett
- The Handmaid's Tale (1990) - Luke
- Star Trek: The Next Generation - "Allegiance" (1990, TV series episode) - Esoqq
- MacGyver: "The Wall" (1990, TV series episode) - Helmut Weiss
- Nobody's Children (1994) - Sorin Dornescu
- Crash Dive (1997) - Richter
- Babylon 5: Atonement (1997, TV series episode) - Dukhat
- Mortal Kombat Annihilation (1997) - Shinnok
- Babylon 5: In the Beginning (1998, TV film based on the TV series) - Dukhat
- Sliders (1998, TV series) - Kolitar
- Bombs Under Berlin (1999, TV film) - Killer
- Wasted in Babylon (1999) - Roman
- Otto – Der Katastrofenfilm (2000) - Kapitän Lackner
- Stones of Light (2001, TV film) - Cyrus van Hooten
- Ice Planet (2001) - Senator Jeremy Uvan
- Null Uhr 12 (2001) - Kommissar
- Pretend You Don't See Her (2002, TV film) - Jimmy Greco
- Detective Lovelorn and the Revenge of the Pharaoh (2002) - Pharaoh Thutmosis
- Traumschiff Surprise – Periode 1 (2004) - Senator Bean
- This Far from Paradise (2005, TV film) - Max McHenry
- Snowman's Land (2010) - Berger
- Devil's Kickers (2010) - Opa Rudi
- Priest (2011) - Minister
- The Fourth State (2012) - Sokolow
- The Child (2012) - Frederik Losensky
- Der Minister (2013) - Doctoral advisor
- A Heavy Heart (2015) - Specht

=== Voice Acting, Dubbing ===
- Atlantis: The Lost Empire (2001) - Commander Rourke (German version)
- Spider-Man (2002) - Norman Osborn / Green Goblin (German version)
- Spider-Man 2 (2004) - Norman Osborn / Green Goblin (German version)
- Star Wars: Episode III – Revenge of the Sith (2005) - Darth Vader (German version)
- Spider-Man 3 (2007) - Norman Osborn / Green Goblin (German version)
- Transformers (2007) - Optimus Prime (German version)
- Transformers: Revenge of the Fallen (2009) - Optimus Prime (German version)
- Iron Man 2 (2010) - Ivan Vanko / Whiplash (German version)
- Transformers: Dark of the Moon (2011) - Optimus Prime (German version)
- Transformers: Age of Extinction (2014) - Optimus Prime (German version)
- Transformers: The Last Knight (2017) - Optimus Prime (German version)
- Bumblebee (2018) - Optimus Prime (German version)
- Spider-Man: No Way Home (2021) - Norman Osborn / Green Goblin (German version)
