= Hrdějovice =

- Municipality
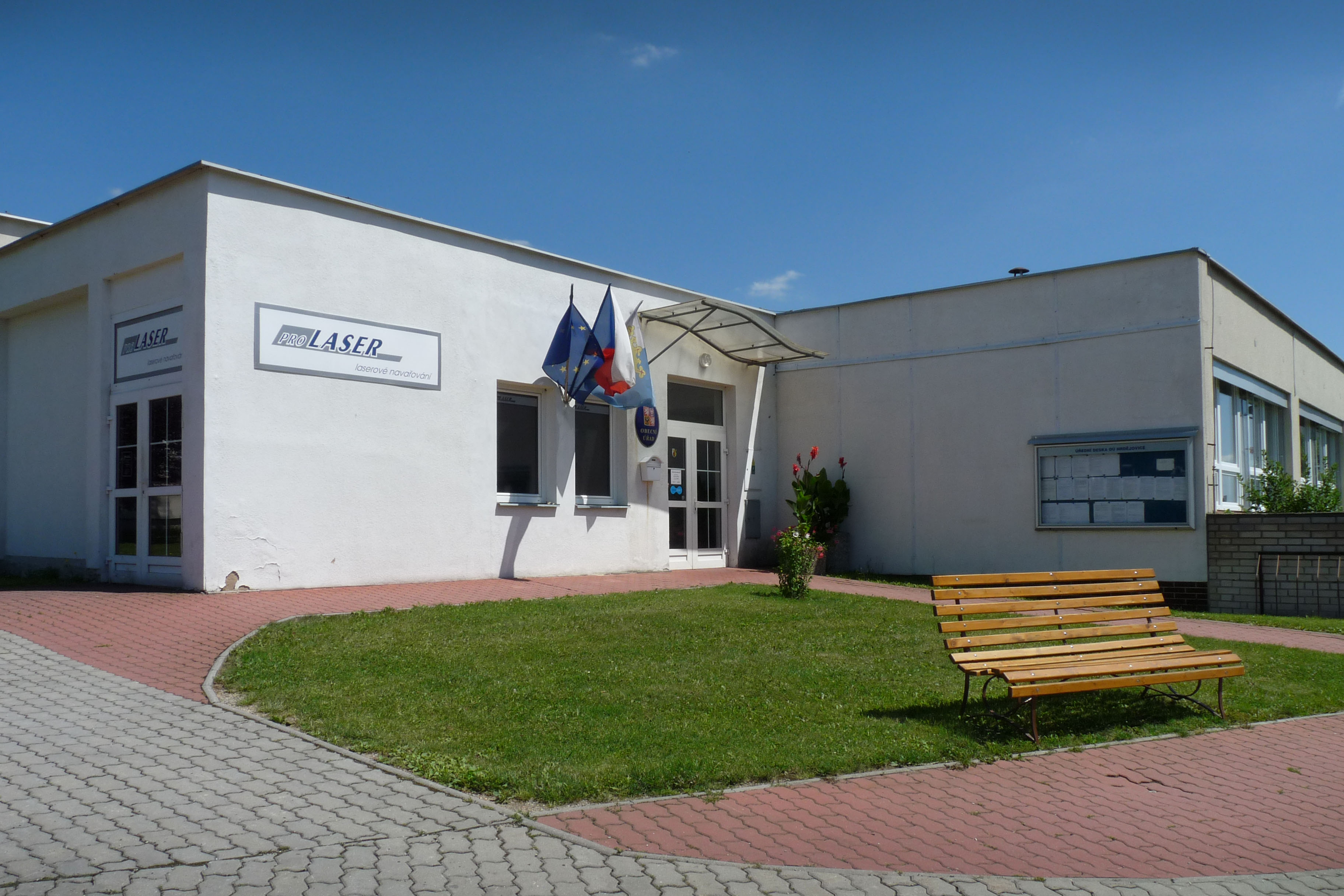
- Municipal office

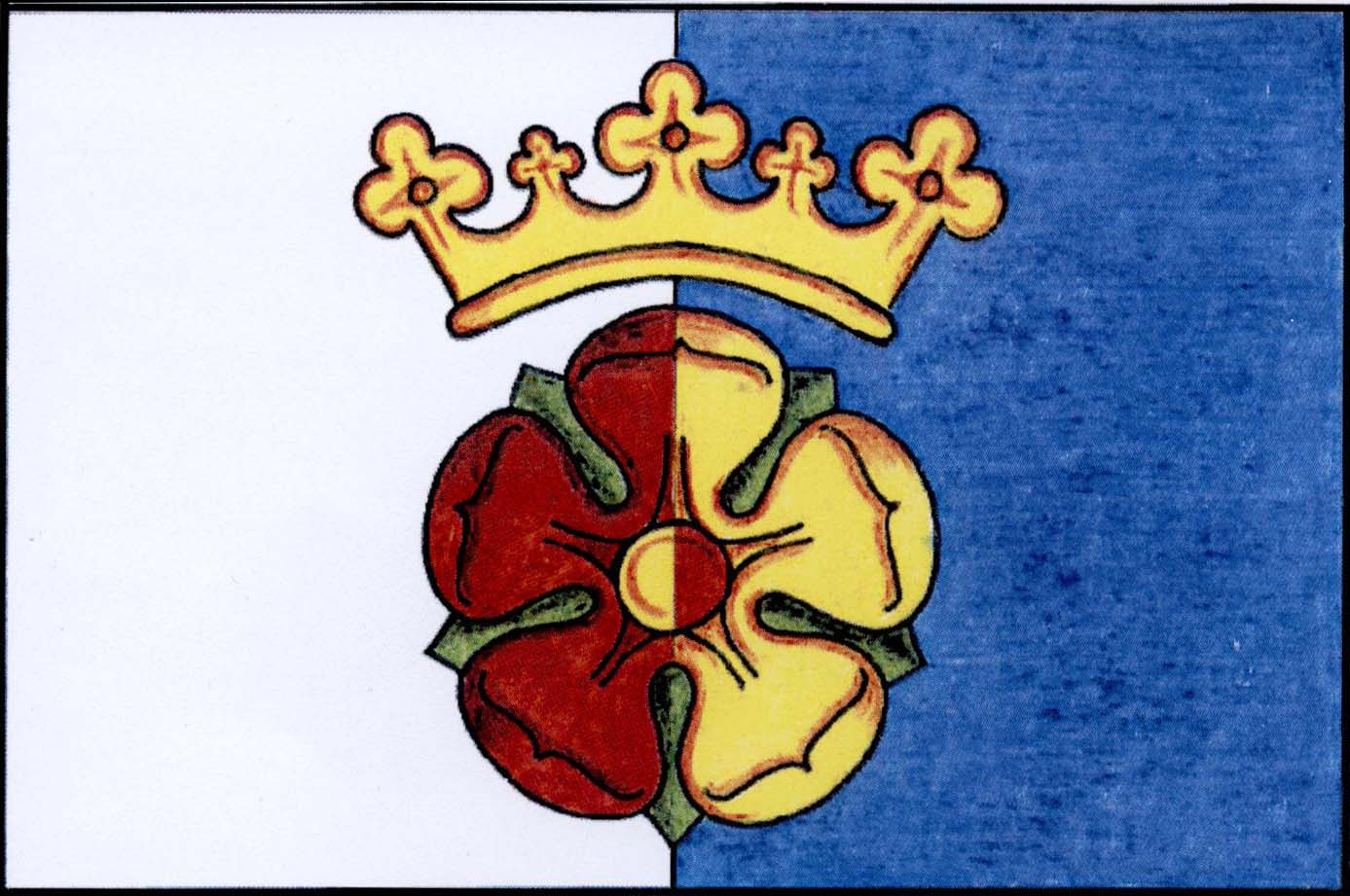
- Flag Coat of arms

- Location in the Czech Republic
- Coordinates: 49°1′8″N 14°28′43″E
- Country: Czech Republic
- Region: South Bohemian
- District: České Budějovice
- First mentioned: 1350

Area
  - Total: 8.82 km^{2} (3.41 sq mi)
- Elevation: 385 m (1,263 ft)

Population (2026-01-01)
  - Total: 1,517
  - Density: 172/km^{2} (445/sq mi)
- Time zone: UTC+1 (CET)
  - Summer (DST): UTC+2 (CEST)
- Postal code: 373 61
- Website: www.hrdejovice-opatovice.cz

Hrdějovice (German: Hartowitz) is a municipality and village in České Budějovice District in the South Bohemian Region of the Czech Republic. It has about 1,500 inhabitants.

== Administrative division ==
Hrdějovice consists of two municipal parts (in brackets population according to the 2021 census):

- Hrdějovice (1,436)
- Opatovice (49)

== Etymology ==
The name is derived from the personal name Hrděj, meaning "the village of Hrděj's people".

== Geography ==
Hosín is located about 4 km (2 mi) north of České Budějovice. Most of the municipal territory lies in the České Budějovice Basin, but it also extends into a tip of the Třeboň Basin in the north. The western municipal border is formed by the Vltava River. There is a former china clay mine called Orty, protected as a nature monument.

== History ==
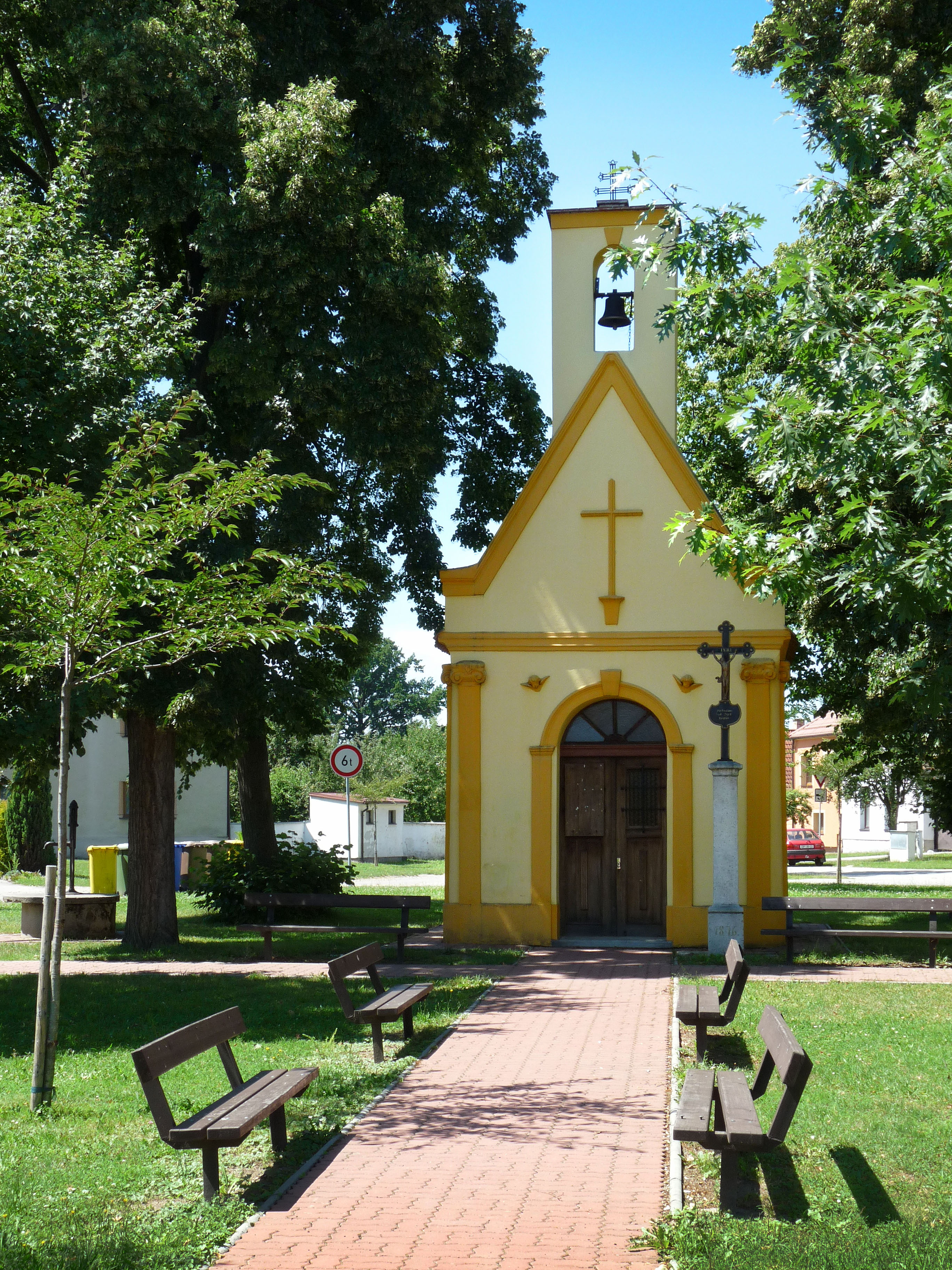
Chapel of the Virgin Mary

The first written mention of Hrdějovice is from 1350. Opatovice was first mentioned in 1378. From 1661 to abolition of serfdom in 1850, it belonged to the Hluboká estate owned by the Schwarzenberg family.

== Demographics ==
Historical population

Year	Pop.	±%
1869	441	—
1880	476	+7.9%
1890	522	+9.7%
1900	747	+43.1%
1910	900	+20.5%

Year	Pop.	±%
1921	1,002	+11.3%
1930	1,302	+29.9%
1950	913	−29.9%
1961	771	−15.6%
1970	692	−10.2%

Year	Pop.	±%
1980	800	+15.6%
1991	945	+18.1%
2001	1,478	+56.4%
2011	1,577	+6.7%
2021	1,485	−5.8%

Source: Censuses

== Transport ==
Hrdějovice is located on the railway line heading from České Budějovice to Tábor and Chotoviny.

== Sights ==
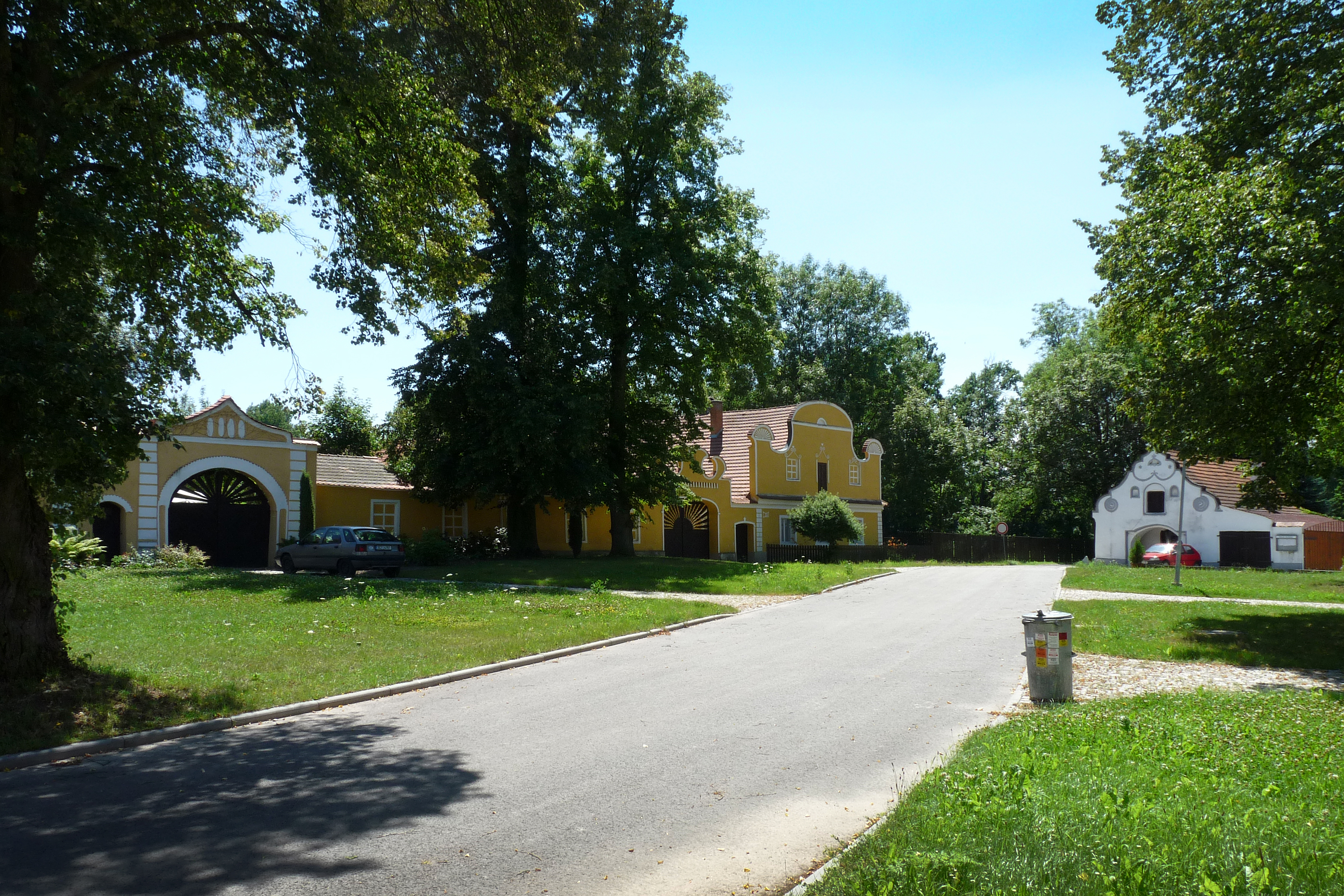
Centre of Opatovice

Among the landmarks of Hrdějovice is the Chapel of the Virgin Mary, built in the Baroque style in the mid-18th century and rebuilt in 1876, and a pilgrimage chapel with a healing well from 1889.

The layout and the folk architecture in Opatovice are well preserved. The village is protected as a village monument zone. The main landmark in Opatovice is the Chapel of the Holy Trinity from 1863.

== Notable people ==
- František Mareš (1857–1942), physiologist, philosopher and politician
