= Bílsko u Hořic =

- Municipality
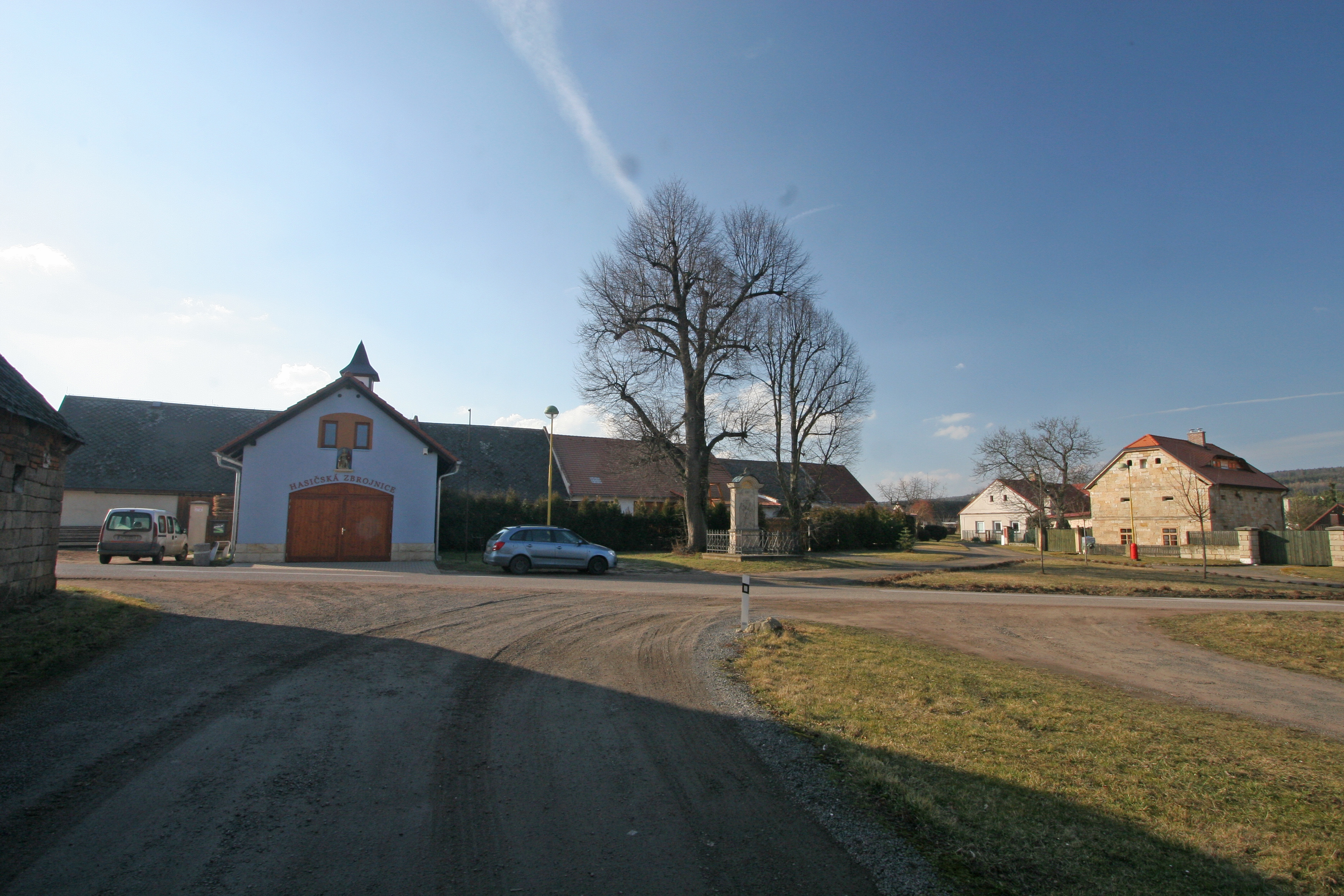
- Centre of the village

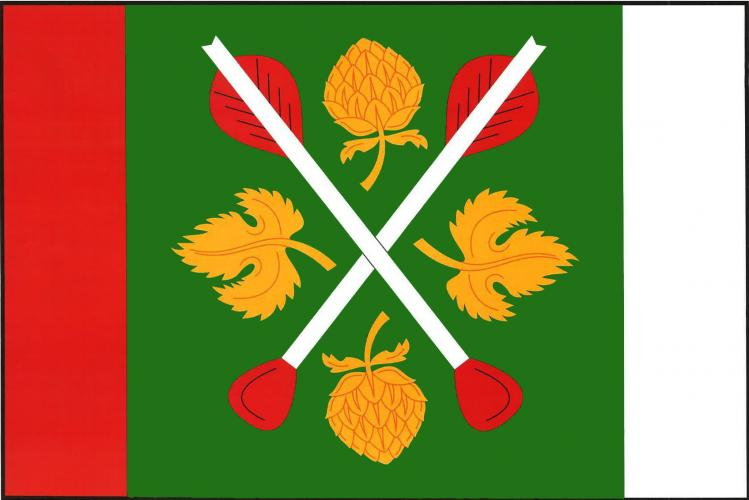
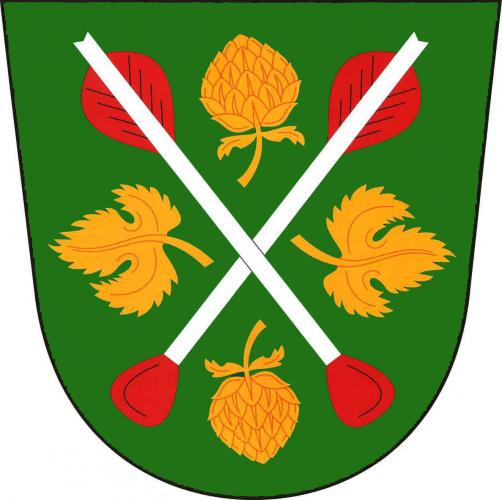
- Flag Coat of arms

- Location in the Czech Republic
- Coordinates: 50°22′10″N 15°36′2″E
- Country: Czech Republic
- Region: Hradec Králové
- District: Jičín
- First mentioned: 1386

Area
  - Total: 2.05 km^{2} (0.79 sq mi)
- Elevation: 250 m (820 ft)

Population (2026-01-01)
  - Total: 118
  - Density: 57.6/km^{2} (149/sq mi)
- Time zone: UTC+1 (CET)
  - Summer (DST): UTC+2 (CEST)
- Postal code: 508 01
- Website: www.bilskouhoric.cz

Bílsko u Hořic is a municipality and village in Jičín District in the Hradec Králové Region of the Czech Republic. It has about 100 inhabitants.

== Demographics ==
Historical population
| Year | Pop. | ±% |
|---|---|---|
| 1869 | 188 | — |
| 1880 | 195 | +3.7% |
| 1890 | 193 | −1.0% |
| 1900 | 173 | −10.4% |
| 1910 | 220 | +27.2% |
| 1921 | 213 | −3.2% |
| 1930 | 221 | +3.8% |
| 1950 | 153 | −30.8% |
| 1961 | 194 | +26.8% |
| 1970 | 158 | −18.6% |
| 1980 | 136 | −13.9% |
| 1991 | 95 | −30.1% |
| 2001 | 110 | +15.8% |
| 2011 | 120 | +9.1% |
| 2021 | 125 | +4.2% |
Source: Censuses

== Notable people ==
- Jan Rys-Rozsévač (1901–1946), journalist and politician
