= Petrovice (Bruntál District) =

- Municipality
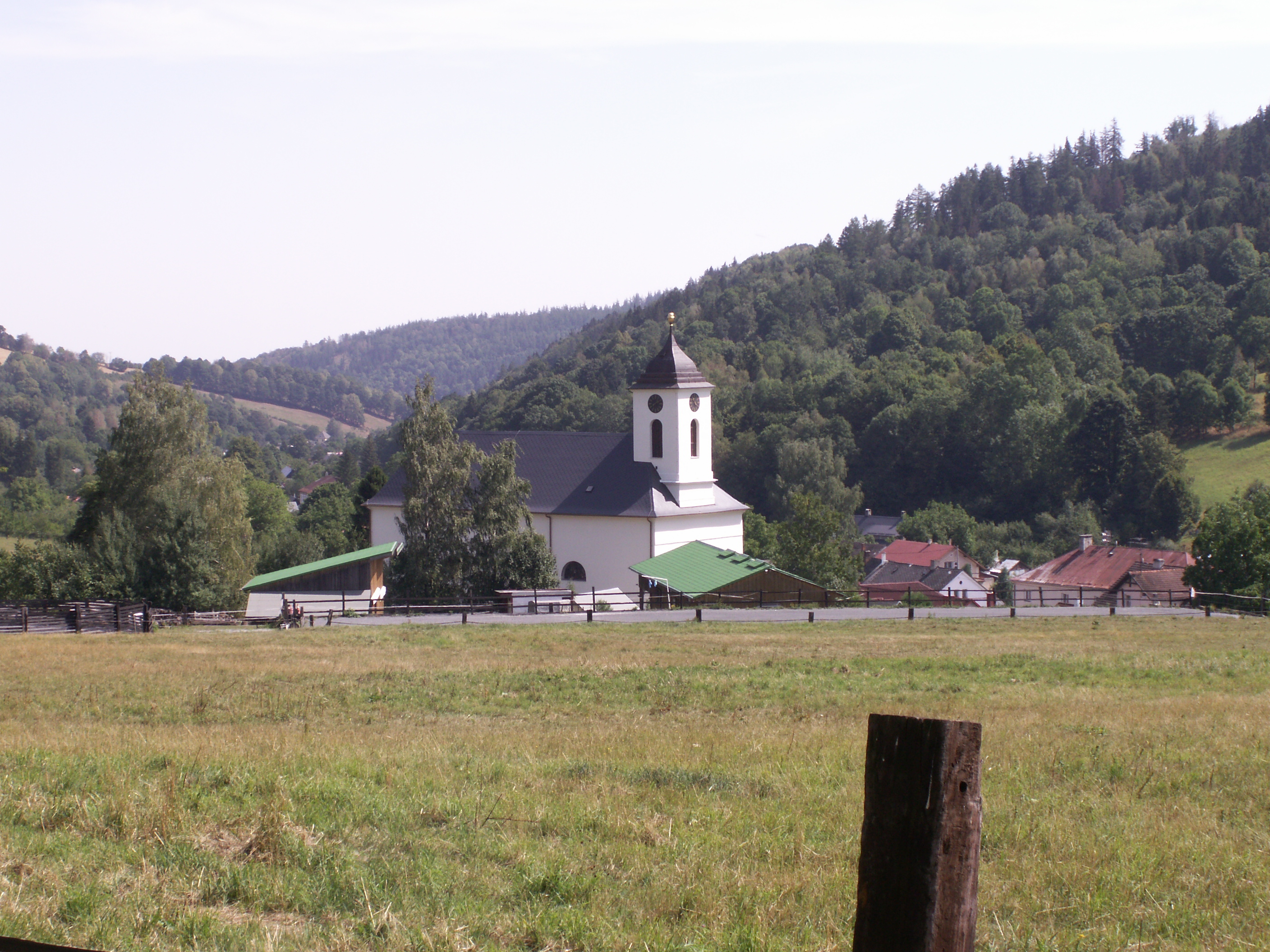
- Church of Saint Roch

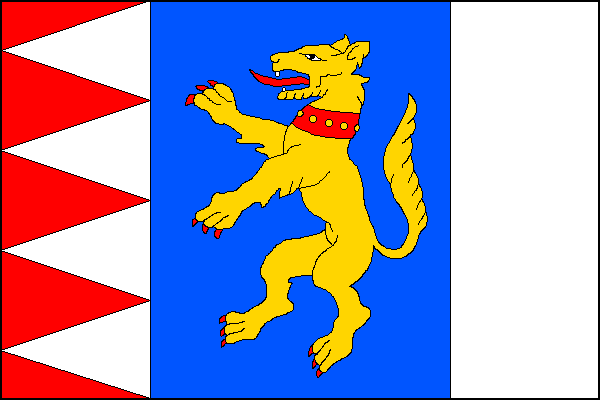
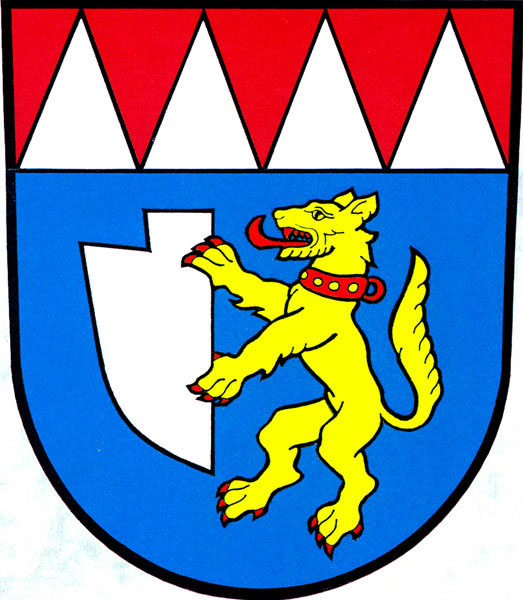
- Flag Coat of arms

- Location in the Czech Republic
- Coordinates: 50°14′20″N 17°26′54″E
- Country: Czech Republic
- Region: Moravian-Silesian
- District: Bruntál
- First mentioned: 1267

Area
  - Total: 11.07 km^{2} (4.27 sq mi)
- Elevation: 468 m (1,535 ft)

Population (2026-01-01)
  - Total: 137
  - Density: 12.4/km^{2} (32.1/sq mi)
- Time zone: UTC+1 (CET)
  - Summer (DST): UTC+2 (CEST)
- Postal code: 793 84
- Website: www.petrovicebr.cz

Petrovice (German: Petersdorf) is a municipality and village in Bruntál District in the Moravian-Silesian Region of the Czech Republic. It has about 100 inhabitants. The village is well preserved and is protected as a village monument zone.

== Etymology ==
The name is derived from the personal name Petr. He was probably the leader of the colonisers who came here in the 13th century.

== Geography ==
Petrovice is located about 27 kilometres (17 mi) north of Bruntál and 70 km (43 mi) north of Ostrava. The municipality is located in the Osoblažsko microregion on the border with Poland.

Petrovice lies in the Zlatohorská Highlands. The highest points are the slopes of Biskupská hora (at 872 m (2,861 ft) above sea level) in the northern part, and the peaks of Kutný vrch (869 m (2,851 ft)) and Solná hora (868 m (2,848 ft)) on the southern municipal border. The built-up area is located in the valley of the Osoblaha River, which originates in the territory of Petrovice.

== History ==
The first written mention of Petrovice is from 1267. The village was founded by bishop Bruno von Schauenburg, probably between 1250 and 1252.

== Demographics ==
Historical population

Year	Pop.	±%
1869	1,327	—
1880	1,320	−0.5%
1890	1,301	−1.4%
1900	1,169	−10.1%
1910	1,024	−12.4%

Year	Pop.	±%
1921	806	−21.3%
1930	749	−7.1%
1950	267	−64.4%
1961	365	+36.7%
1970	306	−16.2%

Year	Pop.	±%
1980	237	−22.5%
1991	167	−29.5%
2001	141	−15.6%
2011	141	+0.0%
2021	122	−13.5%

Source: Censuses

== Transport ==
There are no railways or major roads passing through the municipality.

== Sights ==
The main landmark of Petrovice is the Church of Saint Roch. It is a typical rural single nave church, which was built in the Neoclassical style in 1826–1830.

== Notable people ==
- Josef Pfitzner (1901–1945), German politician and writer, executed for war crimes
