= Pracejovice =

- Municipality
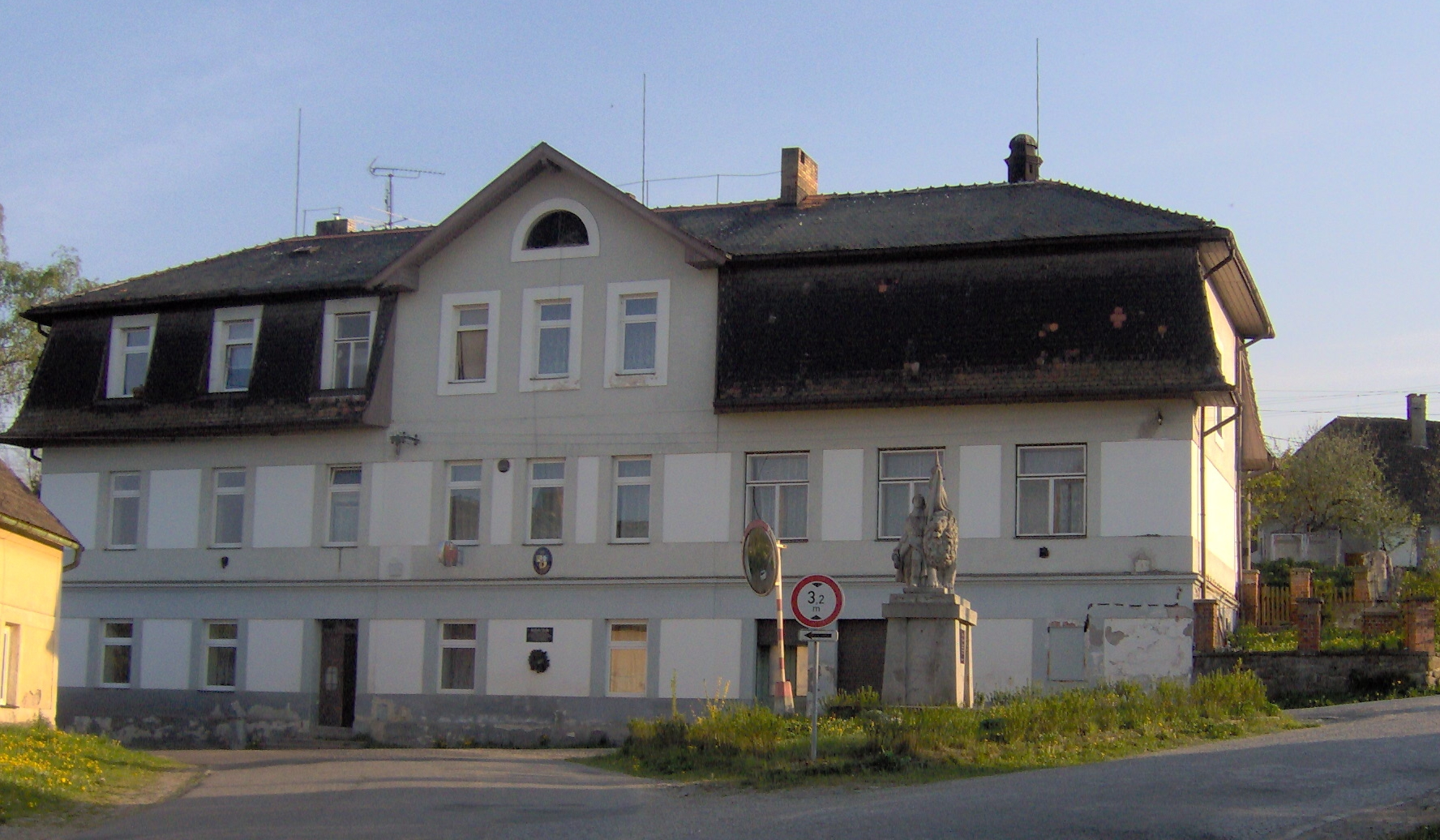
- Birthplace of Rudolf Beran

- Flag Coat of arms

- Location in the Czech Republic
- Coordinates: 49°15′26″N 13°50′57″E
- Country: Czech Republic
- Region: South Bohemian
- District: Strakonice
- First mentioned: 1308

Area
  - Total: 8.00 km^{2} (3.09 sq mi)
- Elevation: 400 m (1,300 ft)

Population (2026-01-01)
  - Total: 319
  - Density: 39.9/km^{2} (103/sq mi)
- Time zone: UTC+1 (CET)
  - Summer (DST): UTC+2 (CEST)
- Postal codes: 386 01, 387 16
- Website: www.pracejovice.cz

Pracejovice (German: Pratzowitz) is a municipality and village in Strakonice District in the South Bohemian Region of the Czech Republic. It has about 300 inhabitants.

Pracejovice lies approximately 4 kilometres (2 mi) west of Strakonice, 55 km (34 mi) north-west of České Budějovice, and 102 km (63 mi) south-west of Prague.

== Administrative division ==
Pracejovice consists of two municipal parts (in brackets population according to the 2021 census):

- Pracejovice (274)
- Makarov (44)

== Demographics ==
Historical population
Year	Pop.	±%
1869	386	—
1880	389	+0.8%
1890	373	−4.1%
1900	388	+4.0%
1910	386	−0.5%
1921	371	−3.9%
1930	359	−3.2%
1950	292	−18.7%
1961	328	+12.3%
1970	301	−8.2%
1980	294	−2.3%
1991	302	+2.7%
2001	305	+1.0%
2011	298	−2.3%
2021	318	+6.7%
Source: Censuses

== Notable people ==
- Rudolf Beran (1887–1954), politician, prime minister of Czechoslovakia
