= Jan Rys-Rozsévač =

- Born: Jan Rozsévač; 1 November 1901; Bílsko u Hořic, Bohemia, Austria-Hungary
- Died: 27 June 1946 (aged 44); Prague, Czechoslovakia
- Cause of death: Execution by hanging

Jan Rys-Rozsévač (1 November 1901 – 27 June 1946) was a Czech journalist and politician. He was the leader of fascist organisation Vlajka.

== Life ==
Jan Rozsévač began to study medicine at a university but did not finish his studies. In 1936 he joined Vlajka (lit. 'flag'), a nationalistic organisation founded in 1930. At the time he adopted the pen name Jan Rys. Under this name he published books Židozednářství - metla lidstva ('Jewish freemasonry - the scourge of humankind', 1938) and Hilsneriáda a TGM ('Hilsner Affair and Tomáš Garrigue Masaryk', 1939). After the Munich Agreement in 1938, Vlajka was officially disbanded and Rys-Rozsévač imprisoned. He was released just before the rest of Czechoslovakia was occupied (15 March 1939) to become leader of Vlajka.

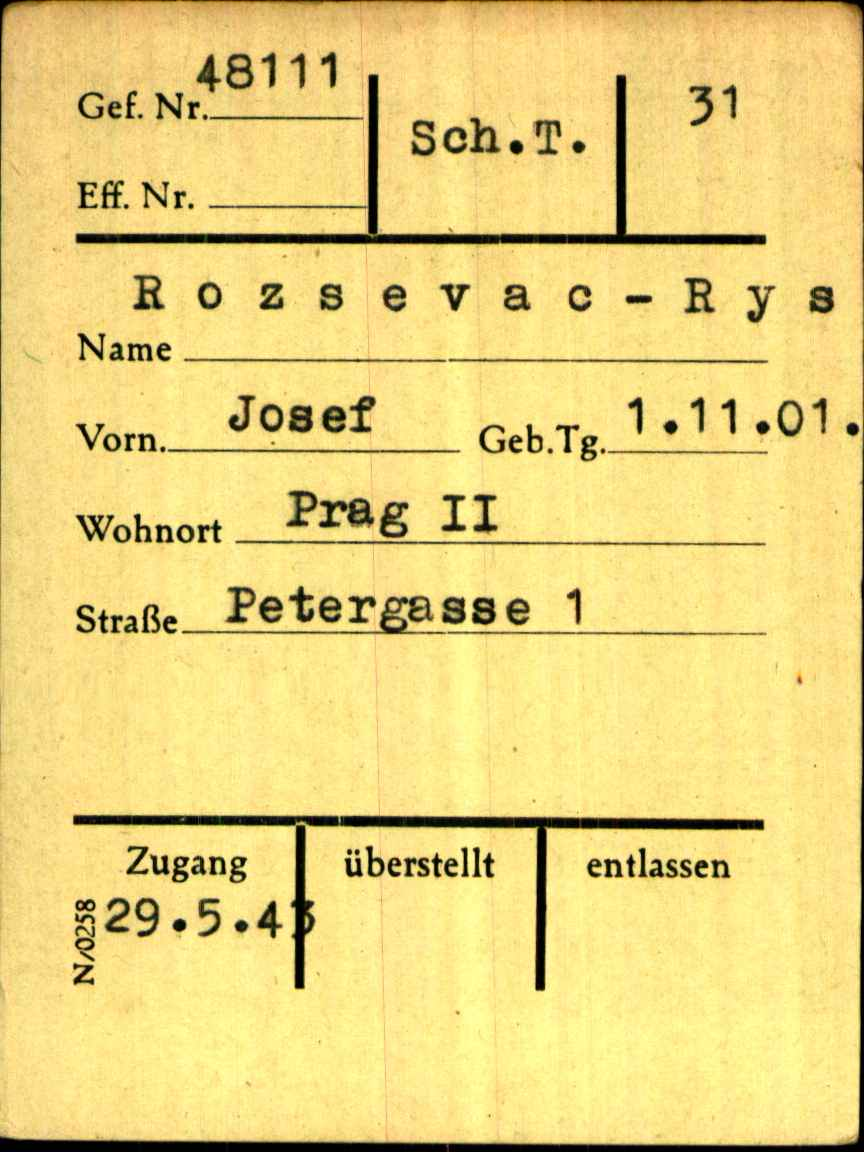
Registration card of Jan Rys-Rozsévač as a prisoner at Dachau Nazi Concentration Camp

Rys-Rozsévač attempted to establish a mass fascist organization and helped to move Vlajka from traditional anti-German chauvinism to collaboration with Nazis and Gestapo. During 1939–1940, Vlajka organized mass meetings against politicians of the First Republic of Czechoslovakia as represented by Masaryk and Beneš. The German occupational authorities nevertheless decided to support a group of collaborators around Emanuel Moravec, his political competitor. Because of constant propaganda attacks on Moravec, Vlajka was disbanded at the end of 1942 and the leaders, including Rys-Rozsévač, were sent as privileged prisoners into the Dachau concentration camp and transferred to Tyrol at the end of the war, where he was liberated in early May 1945. After the war Rys-Rozsévač and three his coworkers (Josef Burda, Jaroslav Čermák and Otakar Polívka) were sentenced to death, and several others to were sentenced to long term imprisonment. Rys-Rozsévač was hanged in Pankrác Prison on 27 June 1946.

== Literature ==
- Milan Nakonečný: Vlajka, 2001, ISBN 80-86183-24-6. Republished as Český fašismus (Czech fascism), 2006, ISBN 80-86226-73-5. Narrative description of Czech fascism and its reprezentants.
