= Snowman's Land (2010 film) =

- Directed by: Tomasz Thomson
- Written by: Tomasz Thomson
- Starring: Jürgen Rißmann, Thomas Wodianka, Reiner Schöne
- Cinematography: Ralf M. Mendle
- Edited by: Tomasz Thomson
- Music by: Luke Lalonde
- Production company: Noirfilm Filmproduktion
- Distributed by: Music Box Films
- Release date: January 22, 2010 (Max Ophüls Festival)
- Running time: 95 minutes
- Country: Germany
- Language: German

Snowman's Land (also known under the working title of Freed Pigs) is a 2010 German comedy crime film that was directed by Tomasz Thomson. The movie had its world premiere on January 22, 2010 at the Max Ophüls Festival in Germany, and stars Jürgen Rißmann as a hit-man sent into exile after he kills the wrong person.

== Synopsis ==
In a German city, a hit-man called Walter kills the wrong man. His boss suggests an immediate and prolonged holiday in a remote place. Walter fancies Mexico but instead is sent to protect a gang boss called Berger, who is hiding out in an isolated mountain hotel somewhere in East Europe. On his way he meets another gangster called Micky, who has been hired for the same job. When the two reach the hotel, having had to leave the car in deep snow, the only occupant is Berger's blonde moll Sibylle, who promptly goes off to a party. Snooping around, they find she is a porn model and has her own drug laboratory. When she gets back, high on narcotics and alcohol, she requires sex from Micky, but during the act his gun goes off and kills her. Walter leaves Micky to dispose of her body and car.

When Berger arrives with his Russian bodyguard Kazik, he becomes suspicious over Sibylle's continued absence. Unhappy at the evasive answers he gets, he and Kazik submit the two to prolonged torture. This ends when they find the car and corpse that Micky had ineptly concealed. Berger believes it was the locals who had done the deed, being anxious to get rid of him. As he gets increasingly paranoiac about intruders, Kazik ties him up and takes charge. The two Germans have no desire to stay, but when Walter goes to his abandoned car it will not start. Then Micky obtains the keys to Berger's car, but Kazik shoots him dead. After burying Micky, Walter trudges off through the snow and is last seen working as a gardener in a place that looks like Mexico.

== Cast ==
- Jürgen Rißmann as Walter
- Thomas Wodianka as Micky
- Reiner Schöne as Berger
- Eva-Katrin Hermann as Sibylle
- Waléra Kanischtscheff as Kazik
- Luc Feit as François
- Detlef Bothe as Harry
- Andreas Windhuis as Waffenhändler
- Anton Weber as Kalle

== Reception ==
On Rotten Tomatoes the film has a rating of 33% based on 12 reviews. On Metacritic it has a score of and 52% based on reviews from 6 critics, indicating "mixed or average reviews".

The New York Times gave a mixed review, praising the cinematography and acting, but stating that the film's storyline was "too pitted with holes and loose ends to permit the film a bump from meh to marvelous." Roger Ebert of the Chicago Sun-Times gave the movie 2 1/2 stars and expressed similar issues, noting that they "can see what Thomson is getting at and even sort of appreciate it at times; the movie isn't boring, but it meanders and loses track of plot threads."
