= Detlef Bothe (actor) =

German actor and filmmaker

- Born: 24 July 1965 (age 61); Braunschweig, West Germany
- Occupations: Actor, director, producer
- Years active: 1990–present

Detlef Bothe (born 24 July 1965) is a German actor, screenwriter, film director and producer. Since the early 1990s, he has appeared in numerous film and television productions, both German and international. In 2015, he appeared in the James Bond film Spectre as a henchman, in a scene where he and Q (Ben Whishaw) are seen riding a cable car in the Austrian Alps.

Bothe became a prominent on-screen representative of the Nazi leader Reinhard Heydrich as he has portrayed Heydrich in three films pertaining to his assassination: the 2011 Czech film Lidice, the 2016 British film Anthropoid, and the 2020 Czech film Betrayer. He also played this role in 2005 in the documentary series Auschwitz: The Nazis and the 'Final Solution'. Bothe is often praised as "dead ringer" of Heydrich.

== Selected filmography ==
- 1993: Tatort (TV Series) – Hubert
- 1992: Der Knappe des Kreuzes
- 1995: Brother of Sleep – Lukas
- 1996: After Hours
- 1996: Gegen den Wind (TV Series) – Eric
- 1997: 14 Days to Life – Rudi
- 1997: Ballermann 6 – René
- 1998: Balko (TV Series) – Richie Schwingbrodt
- 1998: Appetite – Godfrey
- 1999: Sara Amerika – Jim J.
- 1999: Bang Boom Bang – Arne
- 1999: After the Truth – Siebert
- 1999: Schmetterlinge der Nacht – Killer's Helper
- 2000: The Calling – Scouser
- 2001: Himmlische Helden – Flex
- 2001: A Goddamn Job – Orkton
- 2001: 99euro-films – (segment "Ich schwöre") (segment "Loreley S.")
- 2001: Sass – Ede
- 2002: Feiertag (also writer, director and producer) – Ingo
- 2002: Vienna – Thomas
- 2002: Extreme Ops – Ratko
- 2003: Cologne's Finest 3 (TV Movie) – Fliege
- 2003: Baltic Storm – Victor Renko
- 2003: Gone – Eine tödliche Leidenschaft – Mike
- 2004: Abgefahren – Matador
- 2004: Vinzent – Vinzent / Olaf Podesch
- 2004: Meine Frau, meine Freunde und ich (also writer, director and co-producer) – Richard Wippe
- 2005: Speer und Er (TV Mini-Series)
- 2005: Rose – Steve
- 2006: Die Rosenheim-Cops (TV Series) – Konrad Rottmann
- 2006: The Wild Soccer Bunch 3 – Bodyguard Ö
- 2006: FC Venus – Louis Doderer
- 2007: Tour Excess (also writer, director and co-producer) – Dieter
- 2008: The Charlemagne Code (TV Movie) – Richter
- 2009: Mine (also writer, director and co-producer) – Klaus
- 2010: Snowman's Land – Harry
- 2010: Alles Liebe (TV Movie) – Mann aus Plattenladen
- 2010: Max Schmeling – Referee Arthur Donovan
- 2010: Murder Is No Fairy Tale (TV Movie) – Biedermeyer
- 2011: Lidice – Reinhard Heydrich
- 2011: Men in the City 2 – Rocker
- 2011: Anonymus – John De Vere
- 2011: Pilgerfahrt nach Padua (TV Movie) – Mechaniker
- 2012: Nemez – Pfarrer
- 2012: Rommel – Carl Oberg
- 2012: Ludwig II – Bote
- 2013: Tatort (TV Series) – Volker Zahn
- 2013–2017: Hammer & Sichl (TV Series) – Apostolos
- 2014: Into the Suite (also writer, director and producer) – Paul Heitmann
- 2015: Ü 30 Paradiso (also writer, director and producer)
- 2015: Spectre – henchman in Cable Car #1 (Austria)
- 2016: Anthropoid – Reinhard Heydrich
- 2017: Die Vierhändige – Klinger
- 2020: Anatomie Zrady (Anatomy of Betrayal, Czech television film)- Reinhard Heydrich
