= Czech traditional clothing =

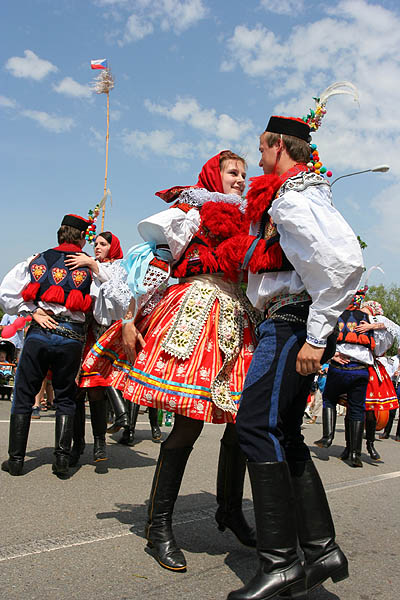
Folk costumes worn during the Jízda králů Festival, held annually in the village of Vlčnov in Moravian Slovakia Vaclav Maly - Girl in Folk Costume Girls in Czech folk costume

Czech traditional clothing expresses Czech history relative to Czech culture and behaviour. Czech folk clothing may be divided into two groups: the Western style in Bohemia and mid-Moravia, and the Eastern style in Moravia and Silesia. In both regions, clothes were made from wool and homespun linen (good for winter). During summer, Czechs wore lightweight fabrics such as silk. Women’s traditional clothing consisted of two aprons, tied in the front and back, and a white blouse. For men, a typical outfit included long breeches and a loose jacket.

== History ==
Antonín Dvořák - Portrét matky (1845)

Information became available during the fifteenth century about styles, accessories and materials used. Under serfdom valuable materials (such as silk and velvet) were prohibited, and farmers wore simple clothing. The sixteenth century was a time of development of textile and sewing technologies; for example, women's clothing was fitted at the waist.

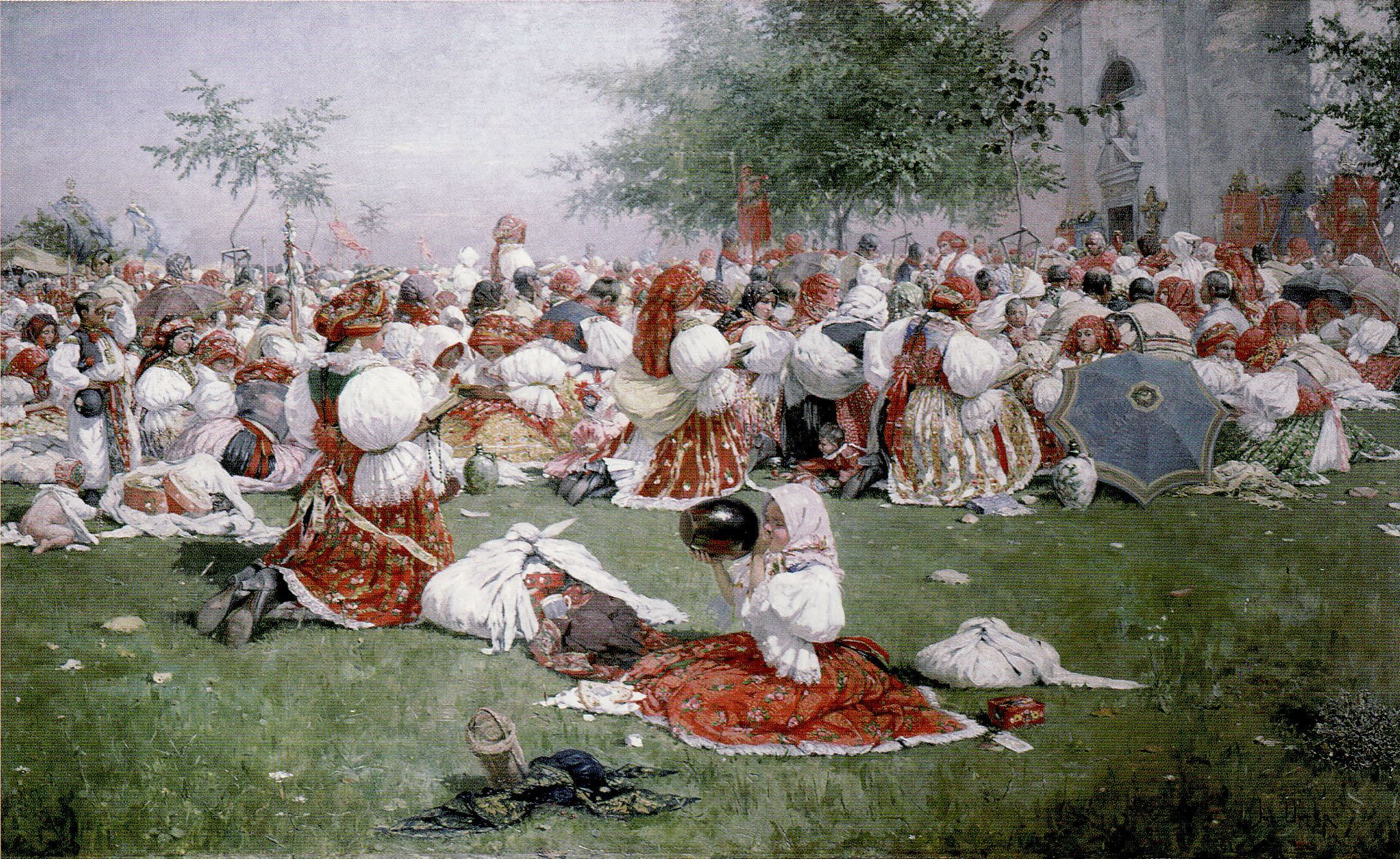
Joža Uprka - Pouť u sv. Antonínka (Brno secesní)

== Regional varieties ==
=== Bohemia ===
Residents of Plzeň wore traditional Slavic clothing until the late nineteenth century. Women in the city wore several layers of thin skirts, a distinguishing feature. The primary fabric was cotton, decorated with ribbons and a silk scarf tied across the chest.

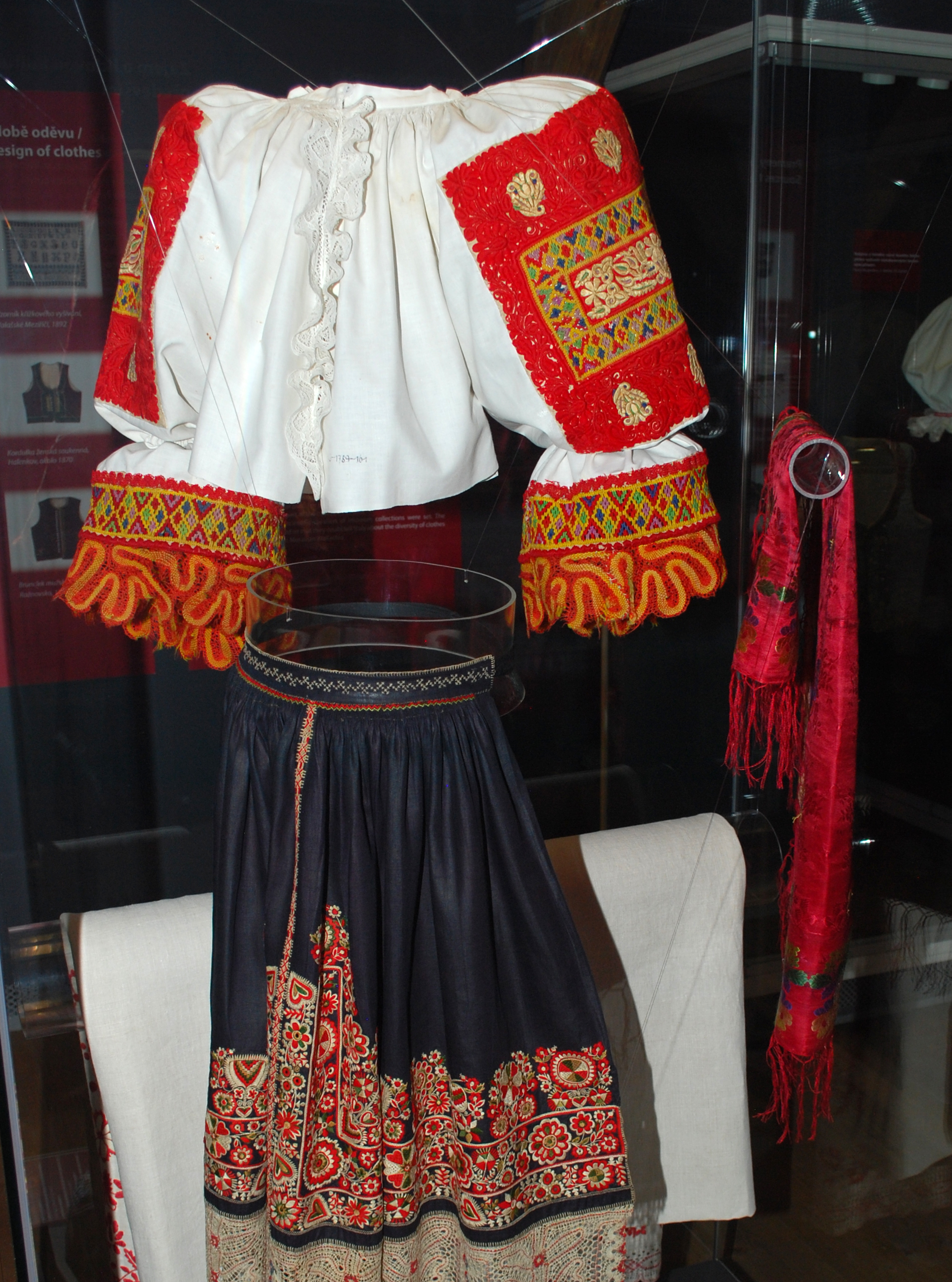
Woman`s attire from Vallachian area.

Dress in the Prácheňsko region differed by generation. Typical dress for a teenaged boy would include a short jacket, narrow trousers and high boots. Older men wore long coats instead of jackets. Women's clothing had a number of differences between the young and old. Married woman wore long skirts (indicating their status), and a white scarf was tied around the head. The caftan consisted of a skirt and bodice.

=== Bohemian-Moravian Highlands ===
Residents of the Bohemian-Moravian Highlands dressed more simply. Young boys wore short undershirts, and the most elaborate element of traditional male clothing was a fur coat.

=== Moravia ===
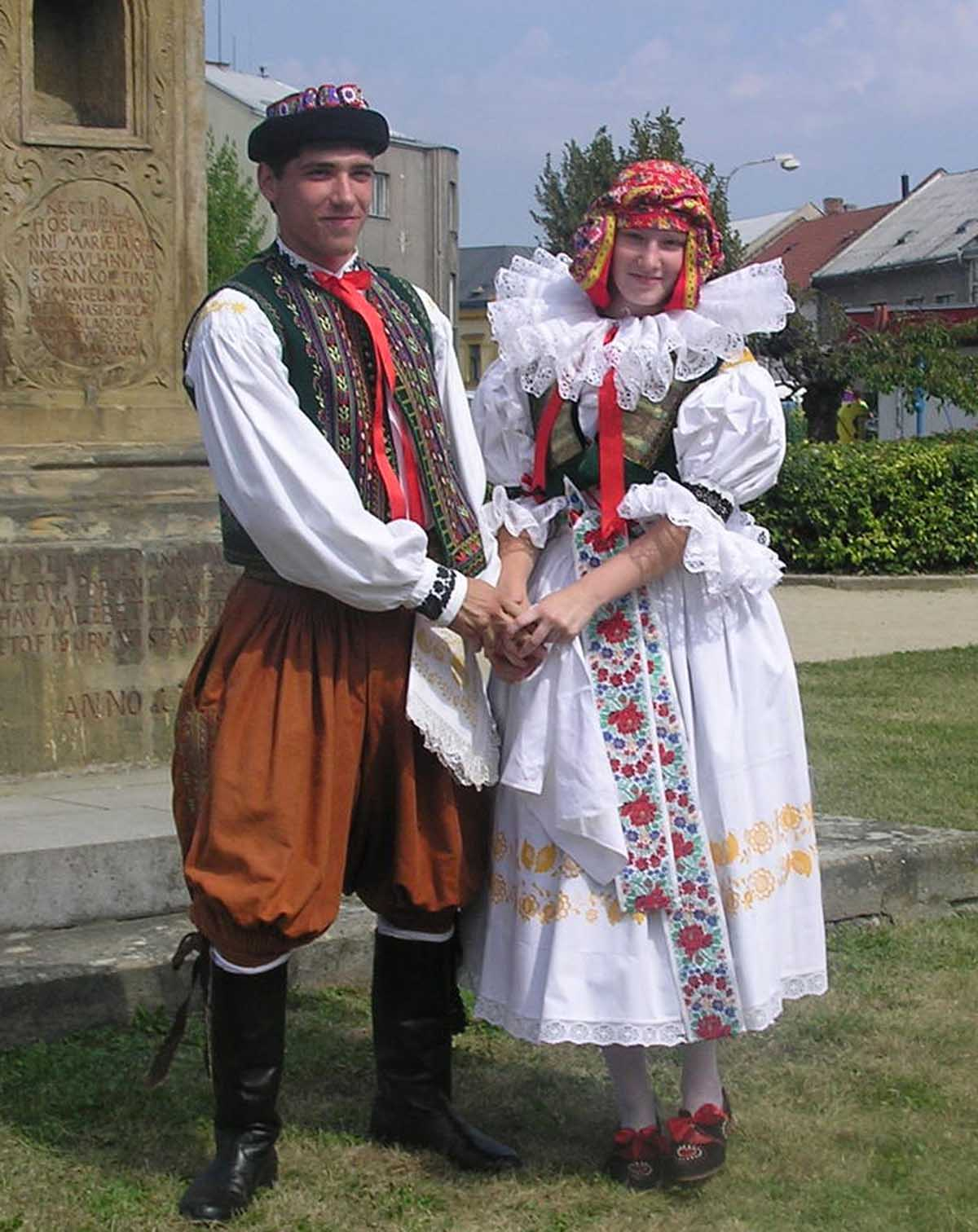
Haná folk costume

In Haná, folk dress was traditional and indicated occupation; dark, simple colors were worn by working people. Women wore a long dress or a high-belted skirt (oplicko) with a short bolero jacket with a stand-up collar. Hanakian women wore a coloured scarf (uvodnice) on special occasions. Like many areas of the Czech Republic, white (sometimes black or yellow) wool coats were popular. Men wore narrow breeches (cervenice), made of yellow leather in the rural districts near Brno. In cool weather a long, white coat was worn, followed by a dark cloth coat in cold weather. For holidays and festivals, coats with wide, gathered collars were worn. Fine clothing featured yellow, white or black embroidery.

=== Moravian Czech Republic ===
Compared to other Czech traditional costumes, clothing in the Moravian Czech highlands was simple.

Rozka Falešníková in folk costume

== Contemporary folk costumes ==
Contemporary dress in the Czech Republic does not differ from that of other Western countries. The shift from traditional to modern clothing occurred during the second half of the nineteenth century, with location playing an important role. Prague is a metropolis with many different Slavic nationalities (Russian, Slovak, Ukrainian, Polish), and the city changed to modern dress earlier than other parts of the Czech Republic; residents of small Bohemian and Moravian villages still wear Slavic folk dress.

Although traditional folk costumes have fallen out of contemporary fashion, many painters, sculptors and writers use them to symbolize the history of the Czech Republic and pride of Slavic culture; painter Mikoláš Aleš depicts traditional Czech clothing, particularly that of his hometown Mirotice.

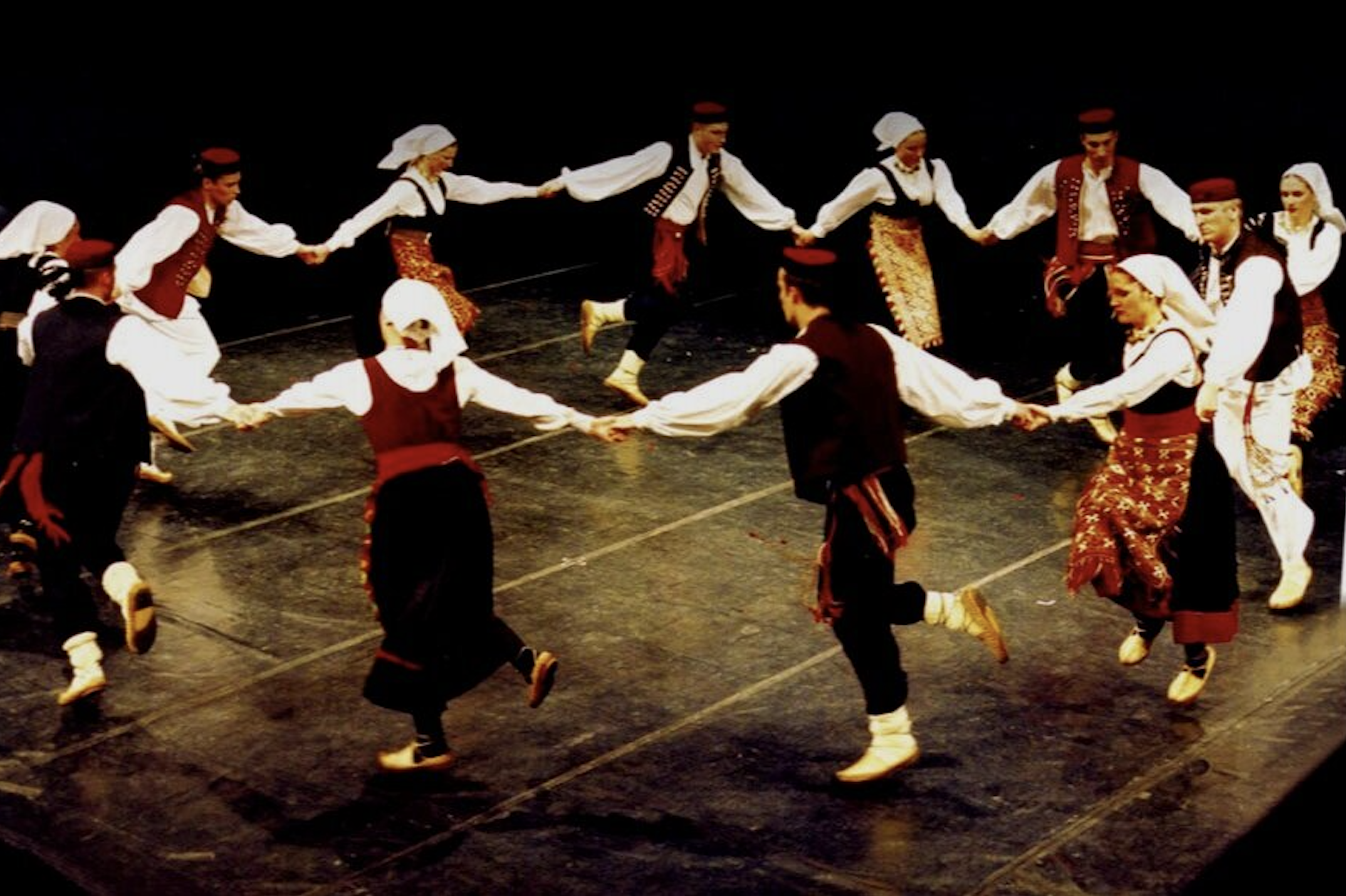
Traditional Czech Folk Dance Girls in traditional costumes of Moravia

== Sources ==
- Langhammerova, J. (2001). Lidove Kroje z Ceske Republiky.
