= František Mareš =

Czech professor of physiology

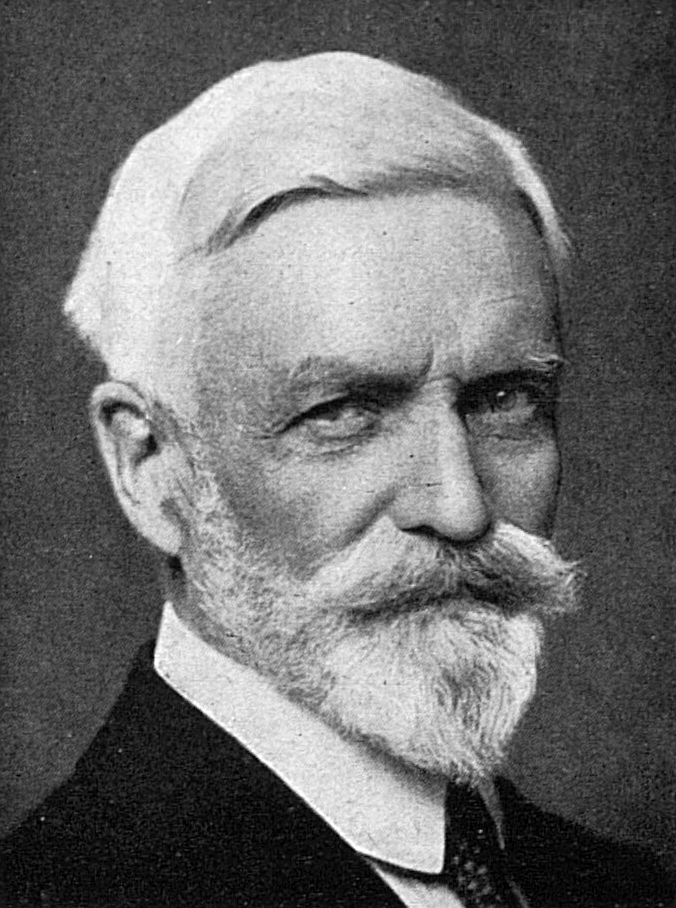
- Mareš in c. 1927

Member of the Senate
- In office 1920–1925

Personal details
- Born: 20 October 1857 Opatovice, Bohemia, Austrian Empire
- Died: 6 February 1942 (aged 84) Hluboká nad Vltavou, Protectorate of Bohemia and Moravia
- Party: National Democratic Party
- Occupation: professor, politician

František Mareš (20 October 1857 – 6 February 1942) was a Czech physiologist, philosopher and nationalist politician. He was a university professor of the Charles University and was rector of the university in 1920–1921, and a member of the Czechoslovak National Democratic Party.

== Life ==
Mareš was born in Opatovice in Bohemia (today part of Hrdějovice, Czech Republic. He studied philosophy and medicine in Prague (postgraduate in Vienna), graduating in 1886. He became a professor in 1890. He became a chairman of the Physiology Institute of the Charles University in 1895, continuing in that capacity until 1928. In 1914 and 1920, he was appointed rector of the Charles University for one year. He was many times appointed dean of Faculty of Medicine. He held an honorary doctorate from the Mayo clinic.

During the war and after the independence of Czechoslovakia from Austria-Hungary in 1918, Mareš became active in the Czechoslovak nationalist movement. He was an active member of the National Democrats, and became a member of the Revolutionary National Assembly of Czechoslovakia in 1918. In 1920, he was elected to the Senate, until the next election of 1925. At that time he became influenced by fascism, much to the dismay of the National Democratic leadership. In 1934, he was part of the leadership of the National Front (Národní fronta), later National Unity (Národní sjednocení). He was also a contributor to Vlajka.

He died in Hluboká nad Vltavou.

== Work ==
Mareš published his research papers mainly in German and French journals. The papers were oriented on metabolism, neurophysiology and winter dormancy in rodents. For medical students he prepared textbooks Všeobecná fysiologie and Fysiologie I-IV. His philosophy was briefly based upon the Vitalism of Henri Bergson and Hans Driesch. He was a critic of positivism, reflected in his book Idealism and Realism in Natural Sciences (1903). He also defended the Manuscript of Dvůr Králové, which were later exposed as forgeries by scientific dating methods.
