= Vlajka =

Vlajka Vlajka
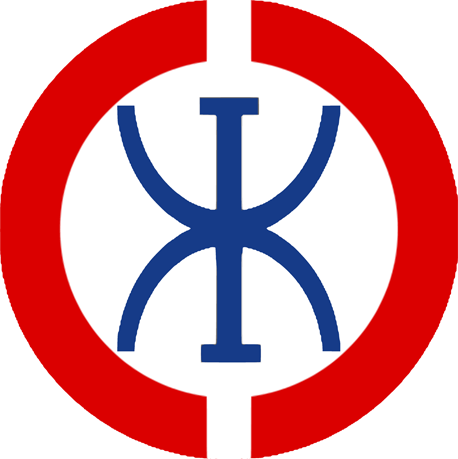
- Leader: Jan Rys-Rozsévač
- Founder: Miloš Maixner
- Founded: 1928
- Banned: 1942
- Newspaper: Vlajka, Arijský boj
- Paramilitary wing: Svatopluk's Guard
- Ideology: Czech nationalism Nazism; Fascism; Germanophile
- Political position: Far-right
- Colours

Party flag

Český národně socialistický tábor — Vlajka (Czech National Socialist Camp — The Flag) was a Czech fascist, antisemitic and nationalist movement. Vlajka's eponymous newspaper was founded in 1928, its first editor being Miloš Maixner. During the time of German occupation, the organisation collaborated with the Nazis, for which it was banned and its members were punished after the liberation.

== History of Vlajka ==
The movement became politically active in the 1930s in the period of the Great Depression, but never gained popularity as there were more established fascist parties in Czechoslovakia, such as the NOF, which even gained some seats in Parliament.

During the Second Czechoslovak Republic, the organization planned bomb attacks against Jewish organizations in revenge for the supposed dominance of Jews in the economy, and the Beran government's supposed willingness to allow Jews to transfer their property abroad. The first bombing, against the synagogue in Hradec Králové, was in January 1939. These attacks continued even after the March 1939 German occupation, because Vlajka was disappointed with their lack of prominence in the Protectorate of Bohemia and Moravia and felt that anti-Jewish policies were not severe enough. The only deaths in these attacks were Vlajka members (two were killed due to inept handling of explosives), but property damage was significant.

After the German occupation the organisation closely collaborated with the Nazi police institutions, such as the Gestapo and Sicherheitsdienst in order to eliminate communists, Jews and people closely connected with the previous Czechoslovak establishment. For that the organisation's existence was tolerated by Germans until 1942, even though there was only one officially permitted Czech political organisation, the National Partnership. The Vlajka became politically unacceptable after another collaborationist, Emanuel Moravec, was appointed the Minister of Education in the government of the Protectorate in January 1942. He was often and openly criticized and fiercely denounced by Vlajka members for being a former legionary, an officer of the Czechoslovak Army and an alleged Freemason. At the end of 1942, Vlajka was disbanded and some of its leaders, including Jan Rys-Rozsévač, were held in the Dachau concentration camp as privileged prisoners.

Though the party no longer existed, its former members continued to collaborate with the Gestapo and SD. Towards the end of the war they even formed the so called Voluntary Company of St. Wenceslaus, the only Waffen-SS unit composed of volunteers of Czech ethnicity (which nevertheless was never involved in any fight).

After the war, the leaders of Vlajka were subject to punishment of 5–20 years of imprisonment according to Beneš decree No. 16/1945 Coll.; mere membership was punishable by up to 1 year of imprisonment according to decree No. 138/1945 Coll. Four leaders of Vlajka and many other Vlajka members who caused the death of people through denunciation, were executed.

== See also ==
- Viktor Dyk, romantic poet and Vlajka contributor
- František Mareš, philosophy professor
- Jan Rys-Rozsévač, leader of the group
- National Fascist Community, competing movement of Radola Gajda
