= Rudolf Beran =

Czech politician

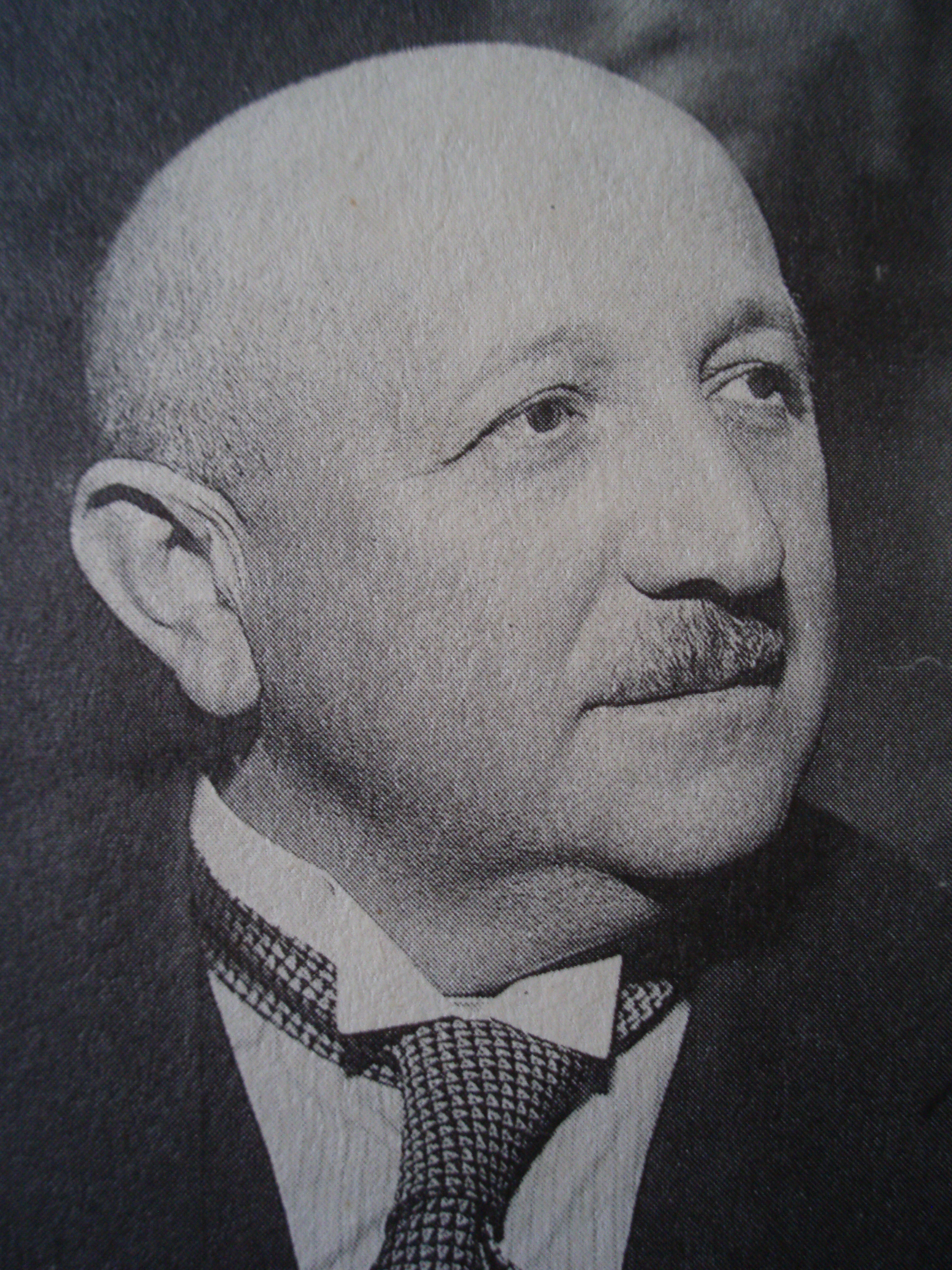

Prime Minister of the Protectorate of Bohemia and Moravia
- In office 16 March 1939 – 27 April 1939
- President: Emil Hácha
- Preceded by: Position established
- Succeeded by: Alois Eliáš

Prime Minister of Czechoslovakia
- In office 1 December 1938 – 15 March 1939
- President: Emil Hácha
- Preceded by: Jan Syrový
- Succeeded by: Jan Šrámek (in exile)

Personal details
- Born: 28 December 1887 Pracejovice, Austria-Hungary
- Died: 23 April 1954 (aged 66) Leopoldov Prison, Czechoslovak Socialist Republic
- Party: Agrarian Party; Party of National Unity; National Partnership
- Spouse: Marie Pilařová

Rudolf Beran (28 December 1887 – 23 April 1954) was a Czech politician who served as Prime Minister of the Second Czechoslovak Republic and Protectorate of Bohemia and Moravia from 1938 to 1939. After World War II he was convicted for collaborating with Nazi Germany and died in prison.

== Early life ==
Rudolf Beran was born in Pracejovice, Austria-Hungary, on 28 December 1887.

== Career ==
Beran was the leader of the Republican Party of Farmers and Peasants.

President Emil Hácha appointed Beran as prime minister on 30 November 1938, and he formed his cabinet on 1 December. Beran dismissed his entire cabinet, except for two members, on 9 March 1939.

On 14 December 1938, Beran stated that he would "solve the Jewish problem". He proposed creating labor camps for Romani people and other groups on 6 February 1939, and the first labor camps were approved by his cabinet on 2 March.

The country was occupied by Nazi Germany, which created the Protectorate of Bohemia and Moravia. Alois Eliáš succeeded Beran as prime minister on 28 April. Beran was arrested in May 1941 by the Germans and spent years in various concentration camps. While he was in custody of the Gestapo in Prague, he had to answer several written questions submitted to him by K. H. Frank, Hitler's Staatsminister of the Protectorate of Bohemia and Moravia.

== Death and legacy ==
Beran was convicted for his collaboration with the Nazis and sentenced to twenty years in prison. He died at the Leopoldov Prison on 24 April 1954. In 2022, the High Court in Prague reopened the case against Beran and Jan Syrový for review.

== Works cited ==
=== Books ===
- Kerner, Robert, ed. (1949). Czechoslovakia. University of California Press.
- Rich, Norman (1974). Hitler's War Aims: The Establishment of the New Order. W. W. Norton & Company. ISBN 0393055094.

=== Magazines ===
- "Milestones". Time. Time Inc. 3 May 1954. Archived from the original on 26 June 2025.

=== News ===
- "Czechoslovakia Aims to Solve Jewish Problem, "premier Beran States". Jewish Telegraphic Agency. 14 December 1938. Archived from the original on 26 June 2025.
- Asiedu, Dita (20 April 2007). "Ghetto No. 1: new Czech film documents life at country's biggest Roma ghetto". Radio Prague. Archived from the original on 26 June 2025.
- McEnchroe, Thomas (4 April 2022). "Court reopens treason case against Czechoslovakia's Munich-era prime minister". Radio Prague. Archived from the original on 26 June 2025.

=== Newspapers ===
- "Former Czech Premier Nazi Collaborator, Dies". Montreal Star. 24 April 1954. p. 41 – via Newspapers.com.
- "Gets Bohemia Post". Lincoln Journal Star. 28 April 1939. p. 14 – via Newspapers.com.

=== Web ===
- "Rudolf Beran". Brockhaus Enzyklopädie. Archived from the original on 26 June 2025.
