= Emanuel Moravec =

Czech military officer, writer, and politician (1893–1945)

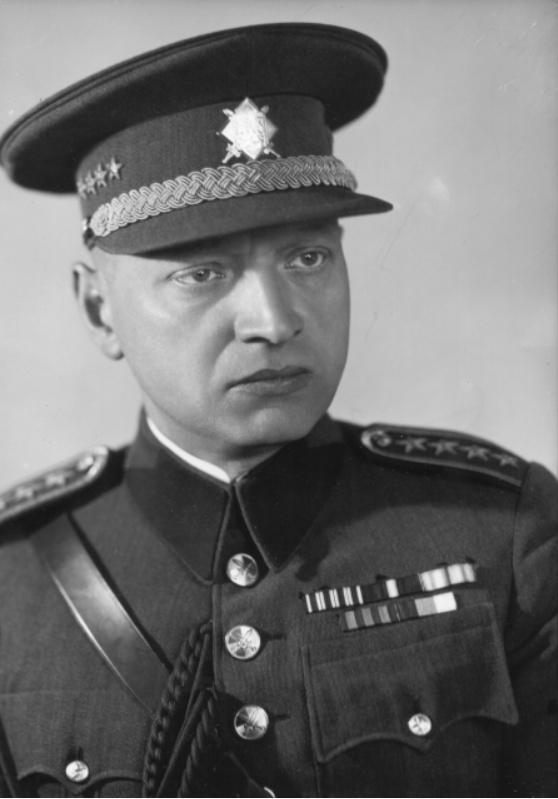
- Moravec in 1932

Minister of Education of the Protectorate of Bohemia and Moravia
- In office January 1942 – May 1945
- President: Emil Hácha
- Prime Minister: Jaroslav Krejčí (1942–1945); Richard Bienert (1945)
- Preceded by: Jan Kapras
- Succeeded by: Position abolished

Personal details
- Born: 17 April 1893 Prague, Austria-Hungary
- Died: 5 May 1945 (aged 52) Prague, Bohemia and Moravia
- Education: War School
- Occupation: Politician; soldier; author

Military service
- Allegiance: Austria-Hungary (1914); Russian Empire (1915–1917); Czechoslovakia (1917–1938)
- Branch/service: Czechoslovak Army
- Years of service: 1914–1938
- Rank: Colonel
- Commands: 1st Field Battalion, 21st Infantry Regiment

Emanuel Moravec (Czech pronunciation: [ˈmoravɛts]; 17 April 1893 – 5 May 1945) was a Czech army officer and writer who served as the collaborationist Minister of Education of the Protectorate of Bohemia and Moravia between 1942 and 1945. He was also chair of the Board of Trustees for the Education of Youth, a fascist youth organisation in the protectorate.

In World War I, Moravec served in the Austro-Hungarian Army, but following capture by the Russians he changed sides to join Russian-backed Serbian forces and then the Czechoslovak Legion, which went on to fight on the side of the White Army in the Russian Civil War. During the interwar period he commanded an infantry battalion in the Czechoslovak Army. As a proponent of democracy during the 1930s, Moravec was outspoken in his warnings about the expansionist plans of Germany under Adolf Hitler and appealed for armed action rather than capitulation to German demands for the Sudetenland. In the aftermath of the German occupation of the rump Czechoslovakia, he became an enthusiastic collaborator, realigning his political worldview towards fascism. He committed suicide in the final days of World War II.

Unlike some officials of the short-lived protectorate government, whose reputations were rehabilitated in whole or in part after the war, Moravec's good reputation did not survive his tenure in office and he has been widely derided as a "Czech Quisling".

== Early life and education ==
Emanual Moravec was born in Prague, the son of a modest merchant family originally from Kutná Hora. (Note: Prague in Danger: The Years of German Occupation, 1939–45: Memories and History, Terror and Resistance, Theater and Jazz, Film and Poetry, Politics and War by Peter Demetz consists of "political and cultural history [interspersed] with snippets of memoir". References to this volume used in this article do not draw on the book's "snippets of memoir".) He graduated from a vocational school and found employment as a clerk at a Prague company. At the outbreak of World War I, Moravec was conscripted into the Austro-Hungarian Army and dispatched with his unit to the Carpathian Front.

Moravec was captured by the Imperial Russian Army in 1915 and held at a prisoner-of-war camp in Samarkand. He was subsequently paroled and given command of a machine-gun platoon in the First Serbian Volunteer Division; a unit consisting of former prisoners of war, including Serbs and other Slavs from the countries of the Austro-Hungarian Empire, fighting on the Russian side. (Note: Many Czech prisoners held by Russia volunteered for service in the Czechoslovak Legion. At the time Moravec was captured, the Legion had yet to be formed and he eagerly enlisted with the Serbian unit instead.) In September 1916, following fierce action against Bulgarian forces along the Dobrudzha Front, Moravec was hospitalized with shell shock. Upon his release, he joined the Czechoslovak Legion, falsely claiming to hold an engineering degree to receive an officer's commission.

The Czechoslovak Legion, a volunteer unit composed of diaspora Czechs and Slovaks as well as deserters from the Austro-Hungarian Army, had been formed in 1917 to support the Allies; it later became involved in the Russian Civil War, fighting on the side of the White Russians. Over the next two years, Moravec saw combat with the Legion in Russia.

== Career ==
=== First Czechoslovak Republic ===
Moravec returned to a newly independent Czechoslovakia at the end of World War I with the legionary rank of captain. He was accepted into Prague's War School and, upon graduation, commissioned as a major in the Czechoslovak Army. He ultimately came to command the 1st Field Battalion of the 21st Infantry Regiment in Znojmo. Simultaneous with his military career, Moravec contributed to newspapers and magazines, including Lidové noviny, on political and military matters. Writing under the pen name Stanislav Yester, he won the Baťa Prize for Journalism.

In 1931 Moravec was appointed an instructor at the War School and promoted to colonel. In his writings, Moravec had become increasingly emphatic about the growing ambitions of Nazi Germany. He called for Czechoslovakia to form an alliance with Poland and Italy against what he saw as a rising German threat. Moravec came to be seen as one of Czechoslovakia's leading geopolitical strategists and caught the attention of President Tomáš Garrigue Masaryk. Moravec wrote the preface to a printed edition of one of Masaryk's addresses to the Czechoslovak Army. In it, he signaled his support for the creation of the democratic state of Czechoslovakia that had come out of World War I, as well as his personal loyalty to Masaryk:

The age of democracy has given us a new man, who has spoken and demanded to be heard in every field of human activity. This new man has given us also a new soldier with new tasks and duties ... No one ... has said so much healthy about the new soldier as President Masaryk.

When Masaryk died in 1937, Moravec served as one of the pallbearers at his funeral. In 1938 Moravec warned that "if Czechoslovakia should fall, France would find herself politically on the European periphery". Moravec argued that the head of the Danube Basin was guarded by what he described as the "fortress of Bohemia" – the land barrier that marked the natural border between eastern and western Europe. If a state were to take Czechoslovakia it would, therefore, control the head of the Danube basin and be free to strike against either France or Poland with ease. Although Moravec was concerned with German political and military aims he generally rejected some of the more extreme aspects of anti-German thought, taking a cautiously receptive approach to Emanuel Rádl's thesis which posited the existence of an irrational Czech racism towards Germans.

==== Munich Agreement ====
In 1938 German demands for the Sudetenland came to a head. In September, General Jan Syrový, inspector-general of the Czechoslovak Army, was installed by President Edvard Beneš as prime minister. In response to the German ultimatum, Syrový declared that "further concessions from our side are no longer possible"; 42 Czechoslovak divisions were mobilized in preparation for an expected German invasion. By the end of September, with Czechoslovakia abandoned by France and Britain, and territorial demands piled on from Poland, Beneš backtracked on Czechoslovakia's refusal to accept further German requests.

At this time, as well as holding his army post, Moravec was serving as a member of the Committee for the Defense of the Republic, a nationalist pressure group led by the son of the former Czechoslovak finance minister Alois Rašín. In that capacity he sought an audience with Beneš during the last week of September, on the eve of the Munich ratification. During a two-hour confrontation with Beneš, Moravec pleaded with the president to declare war against Germany, and not capitulate to German demands. His pleas went unheeded.

=== Second Czechoslovak Republic ===
The Munich Agreement left Moravec disillusioned with both Western democracies and Beneš' diplomatic competence. According to Moravec, "apostles without courage" had led Czechoslovakia to capitulation. He expressed anger at the government's evocation of national ideals in its announcement of the agreement, declaring that a state unwilling to defend its ideals should not boast of them in the same way "a whore has no right to boast of her honor". As a further expression of his contempt for the government, he mockingly requested leave to join the army of El Salvador.

During the short-lived Second Czechoslovak Republic, with Prague actively seeking to appease Germany to avoid further territorial losses, Moravec was forced to quit teaching at the military academy. Moreover, he found himself prohibited by the government from writing for newspapers due to concerns that the incendiary, anti-German nature of his editorials would be unduly provocative.

=== Protectorate of Bohemia and Moravia ===
An excerpt from a newsreel showing Moravec at the 1944 Week of Czech Youth in Prague.

Excerpt from a radio broadcast by Emanuel Moravec

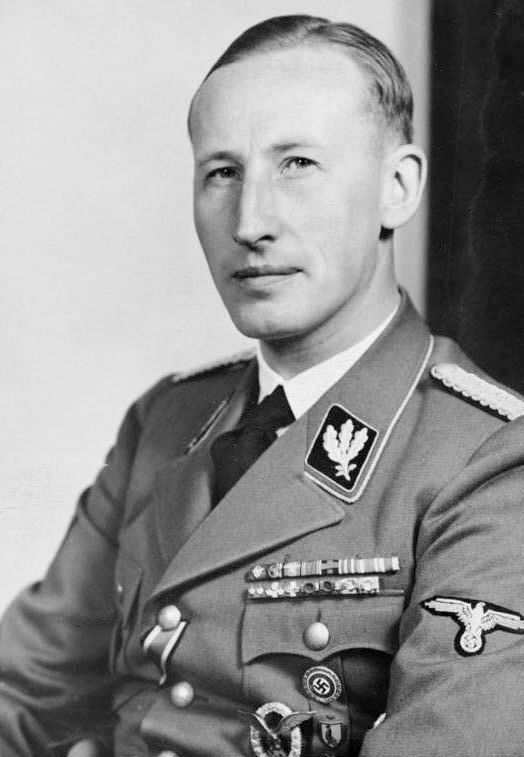
Emanuel Moravec was the original target of what became known as Operation Anthropoid, but Reinhard Heydrich (pictured) was ultimately selected for assassination.

On 16 March 1939, Germany occupied the rump Czechoslovak state and the German-controlled Protectorate of Bohemia and Moravia was declared. According to František Moravec, (Note: František Moravec bore no relation to Emanuel Moravec.) Emanuel Moravec attempted to leave the Czech lands prior to the German arrival and join the military cadre being sent abroad. (Note: Czechoslovak agents within the Wehrmacht alerted the military to the coming German annexation several days in advance. Hours before the arrival of German forces, a cadre of Czechoslovak Army intelligence personnel were ordered to evacuate the country to preserve the continuity of the intelligence service. Operations centers were subsequently established in London and Paris.) His offer of service was rejected. Moravec was particularly concerned that his earlier denunciations of Germany, and his reputation as a strident anti-German polemicist, might make him a target of the new regime. He was surprised, therefore, when the new German authorities informed him he could resume writing books and newspaper columns. Moravec returned to writing with gusto and a reoriented editorial line, declaring "our nation could have died in war [with Germany]. Now the whole nation will die of fright and fear".

Writing in V úloze mouřenína – Československá tragedie 1938, the most popular of his works, Moravec sought to more fully reconcile his support for the Germans with his earlier calls for resistance. He indicted Beneš and the intelligentsia for Czechoslovakia's defeat and declared it was the unwillingness of the elite to confront Germany militarily that demonstrated democracy's moral decay, thereby ultimately justifying its termination:

... the mottoes humanism and democracy were fluttering about everywhere, but the Czech nation was actually living off its great military tradition of Hussitism and revolutionary armies. All attempts to smother the old-soldierly character that was in the blood of this people led nowhere. The soppy lemonade of moribund pacifism offered in the fragile glass of the League of Nations (that was after 1919 already cracked) was enjoyed only by a group of the intelligentsia that had a particularly girlish character.

In 1941 Moravec helped found the Board of Trustees for the Education of Youth, a fascist youth group, and served as its chairman. The following year, Reinhard Heydrich who, in his role as the Berlin-appointed Deputy Protector of Bohemia and Moravia held penultimate day-to-day authority in the protectorate, compelled President Emil Hácha to appoint Moravec as the protectorate's education minister. Unlike other protectorate ministries, the education ministry under Moravec was given a measure of autonomy and not required to report to an overseer in the office of the Reich Protector. As with all protectorate ministers, Moravec's mandate to hold office was at the pleasure of the Reich Protector, as set-out in the 16 March 1939 decree of the German government.

==== Policies and initiatives as Minister of Education ====
By the time Moravec was given authority for the education ministry, Czech universities had been closed, school textbooks revised, and more than 1,000 student leaders deported to Sachsenhausen concentration camp.

In his new post as minister of education, Moravec instituted the study of German as a compulsory subject in schools, explaining that it would become a lingua franca of Europe: "[e]very Czech who desires to excel in the future must acquire the German language so that work opportunities in all fields are open to them not only in the Reich, but also in Europe and the whole world ... learn German in order that the Czechs' good reputation can spread way beyond the frontiers of Bohemia and Moravia". He also promoted the idea of Czech culture as a historic component of Germanic culture. The Czech Women's Center, originally founded during the Second Republic as a group of professional women seeking greater gender equality, operated under Moravec's auspices. It was at his suggestion that it became a leading advocate for nutritional education.

Moravec did not limit himself to educational questions. In 1943 he advanced a proposal to deploy the Army of the Protectorate to the Eastern Front in support of German operations. Hácha discussed the proposal with Reich Minister for Bohemia and Moravia Karl Hermann Frank who ultimately decided not to forward it to Adolf Hitler.

Moravec reportedly offered the noted Czech journalist Ferdinand Peroutka release from Buchenwald concentration camp in exchange for accepting a position writing for the newspaper Lidové noviny, an offer Peroutka declined.

==== Anti-Semitism ====
During his tenure as education minister, Moravec adopted an anti-Semitic worldview that largely mirrored that of the Nazi Party. It positioned Germany as fighting a war to save humanity from Judaism. Moravec publicly blamed Jews for pre-war tensions between the former Czechoslovakia and Germany. He claimed that "Jewish capitalist interests hitched themselves to Anglo-French strategic interests and, entirely artificially and cunningly, escalated Czech hatred of the German nation to a state of unbounded fury." In Tatsachen und Irrtümer ("Facts and Errors") Moravec declared that the annexation of the Czech lands to Germany would benefit Czechs "because the Jews have been excluded from the German nation, the agents of capitalism have been rendered powerless in Germany".

==== Assassination target ====
In the winter of 1939–40, the Czechoslovak resistance group known as the Three Kings attempted to kill Moravec with a letter bomb. The Czechoslovak government-in-exile also considered targeting Moravec for assassination, but decided to go after Heydrich instead in what became known as Operation Anthropoid. Following Heydrich's death, Moravec was a keynote speaker at several mass rallies throughout the Protectorate. These were intended to demonstrate the opposition of ordinary Czechs to Heydrich's killing.

== Death ==
During the Prague Uprising of May 1945, Moravec attempted to drive to a radio station under German control in the hope of broadcasting an appeal for calm. When the vehicle he was traveling in ran out of fuel Moravec dismounted and shot himself in the head with a pistol, presumably to avoid capture. He died four days before the liberation of Prague.

== Personal life ==
Moravec was a Master Mason, a fact that earned him contempt from some in the pre-Protectorate Czech fascist community such as the Vlajka. (Note: Nazi hostility to Freemasonry originated in a belief by Hitler that "through it, Jews sidestepped the racial and legal barriers that marginalized them in European society". Because Freemasonry had no biological component, it was not unusual for Masons to simply stop self-identifying as such as a means of demonstrating regime loyalty.)

Both Moravec and his private secretary, Franz Stuchlik, were keen rock collectors. After Moravec's death, his collection was confiscated by the Czechoslovak state and donated to the National Museum. As of 2015, 107 mineral samples from Moravec's private collection were still held by the museum.

=== Marriages ===
Moravec was married three times. His first wife, Helena Georgijevna Beka, whom he met while a prisoner of war in Samarkand, was a close relative of the prominent Bolshevik Alexei Rykov. With her he had two sons, Igor (1920-1947) and Jurij (1923-1964). In 1932 he was divorced and, in April that year, married Pavla Szondy, who gave birth to Moravec's third son, Pavel. This marriage also ended in separation, Moravec and Szondy divorcing in 1938. In 1942 Moravec married Jolana Emmerová, his housemaid, who was only sixteen when their relationship caused the end of his previous marriage.

=== Children ===
Igor fought on the Eastern Front as a volunteer with the 3rd SS Panzer Division Totenkopf. His younger brother, Jurij, served in the Wehrmacht's 137th Infantry Division and unlike Igor was privately critical of his father's political views. While serving in France, Jurij was caught drunk on guard duty and sentenced to six months imprisonment and a one grade demotion. At the request of Emanuel Moravec, Frank personally appealed to OKW operations chief Generaloberst Alfred Jodl in the matter and the younger Moravec's sentence was quashed.

Pavel was sent to school in Salzburg after the establishment of the Protectorate and died in an air raid in 1944. Igor was arrested and executed by hanging at the end of the war on charges of murder and treason. Jurij was arrested and sentenced to a prison term at the end of the war and upon release emigrated to West Germany.

== Legacy ==
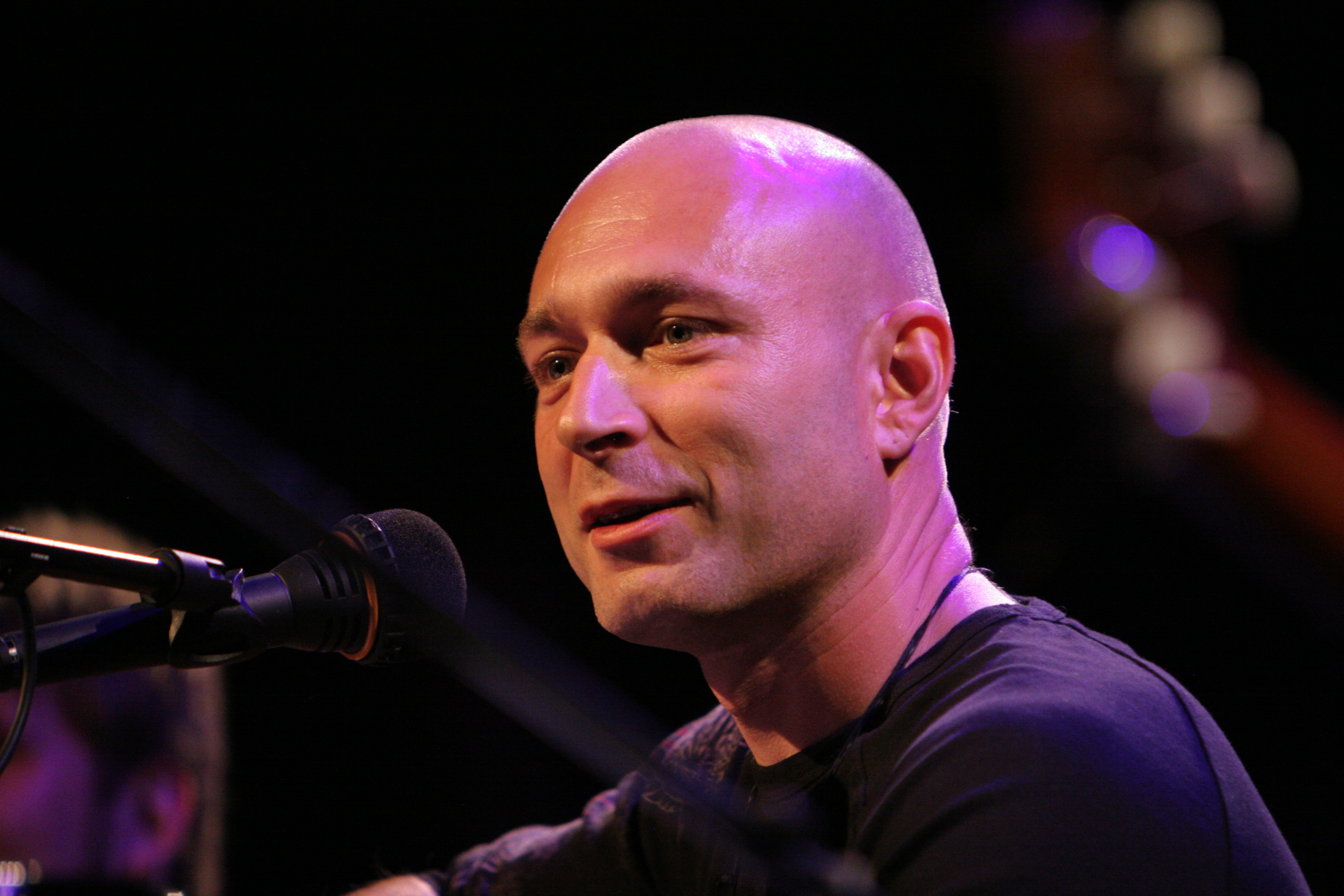
In the Czech television series České století, Moravec is portrayed by Daniel Landa (pictured).

Denounced by the Allies and the Czech government-in-exile during World War II as a "Czech Quisling", Moravec has been described by John Laughland as "an enthusiastic collaborator" with Nazi Germany. This contrasts with other protectorate-era officials like Emil Hácha, whom Laughland calls "a tragic figure", or Jaroslav Eminger, who was later completely exonerated for his service in the Protectorate government. During the 2006 presentation of the Gratias Agit Award, given annually by the Czech Ministry of Foreign Affairs to recognize those who promote the Czech Republic, foreign minister Cyril Svoboda declared that "... we are also a country of those who have deformed our good name, people [such] as Emanuel Moravec, Klement Gottwald".

Czech historian Jiří Pernes has argued that if Moravec had died before March 1939, he would have been remembered as a well-regarded Bohemian patriot; his pre-war record was sufficiently distinguished to earn him a place in history.

In 1997, Pernes published a biography of Moravec. He was later criticized for the volume which, it was alleged, was heavily plagiarized from a doctoral dissertation on Moravec's life written by Josef Vytlačil.

In 2013, Daniel Landa portrayed Moravec in an episode of the Czech historical drama television series České století (lit. 'Czech Century'), titled "Den po Mnichovu (1938)" (lit. 'The Day after Munich'). The episode centres on Moravec' fierce opposition to president Beneš' capitulation to the invading German forces, ending with their face-to-face discussion. A mid-credits scene then reveals Moravec' later conversion to Nazi ideology. The episode suggests an ambivalence between genuine and pathological national pride, also by casting Landa, himself a known and controversial nationalist.

== Publications ==
- Moravec, Emanuel. (1936). Obrana státu ("National Defence"). Prague: Svaz čs. důstojnictva.
- Moravec, Emanuel. (1936). Válečné možnosti ve střední Evropě a válka v Habeši ("Military Capabilities in Central Europe and the Abyssinian War") Prague: Svaz čs. důstojnictva.
- Moravec, Emanuel. (1939). Válečné možnosti ve střední Evropě a válka v Habeši ("Military Capabilities in Central Europe and the Abyssinian War") Prague: Orbis Verlag.
- Moravec, Emanuel. (1940). Děje a bludy ("Ideas and Delusions") Prague: Orbis Verlag.
- Moravec, Emanuel. (1941). O smyslu dnešní valky; cesty současné strategie. ("The Meaning of Today's War") Prague: Orbis Verlag.
- Moravec, Emanuel. (1941). V úloze mouřenína: Československá tragedie 1938 ("In the Role of the Moor: the Czechoslovak Tragedy of 1938") Prague: Orbis Verlag.
- Moravec, Emanuel. (1942). Tři roky před mikrofonem. ("Three Years in Front of the Microphone") Prague: Orbis Verlag.
- Moravec, Emanuel. (1942). Tatsachen und Irrtümer ("Facts and Errors") Prague: Orbis Verlag.
- Moravec, Emanuel. (1943). O český zítřek. ("About Tomorrow's Czechia") Prague: Orbis Verlag.

== See also ==
- Josef Ježek, interior minister of the Protectorate of Bohemia and Morava

== Notes ==
Political offices
Preceded by Jan Kapras	Minister of Education of Bohemia and Morava; 1942–1945	Succeeded by Position abolished
