= The Holocaust in Bohemia and Moravia =

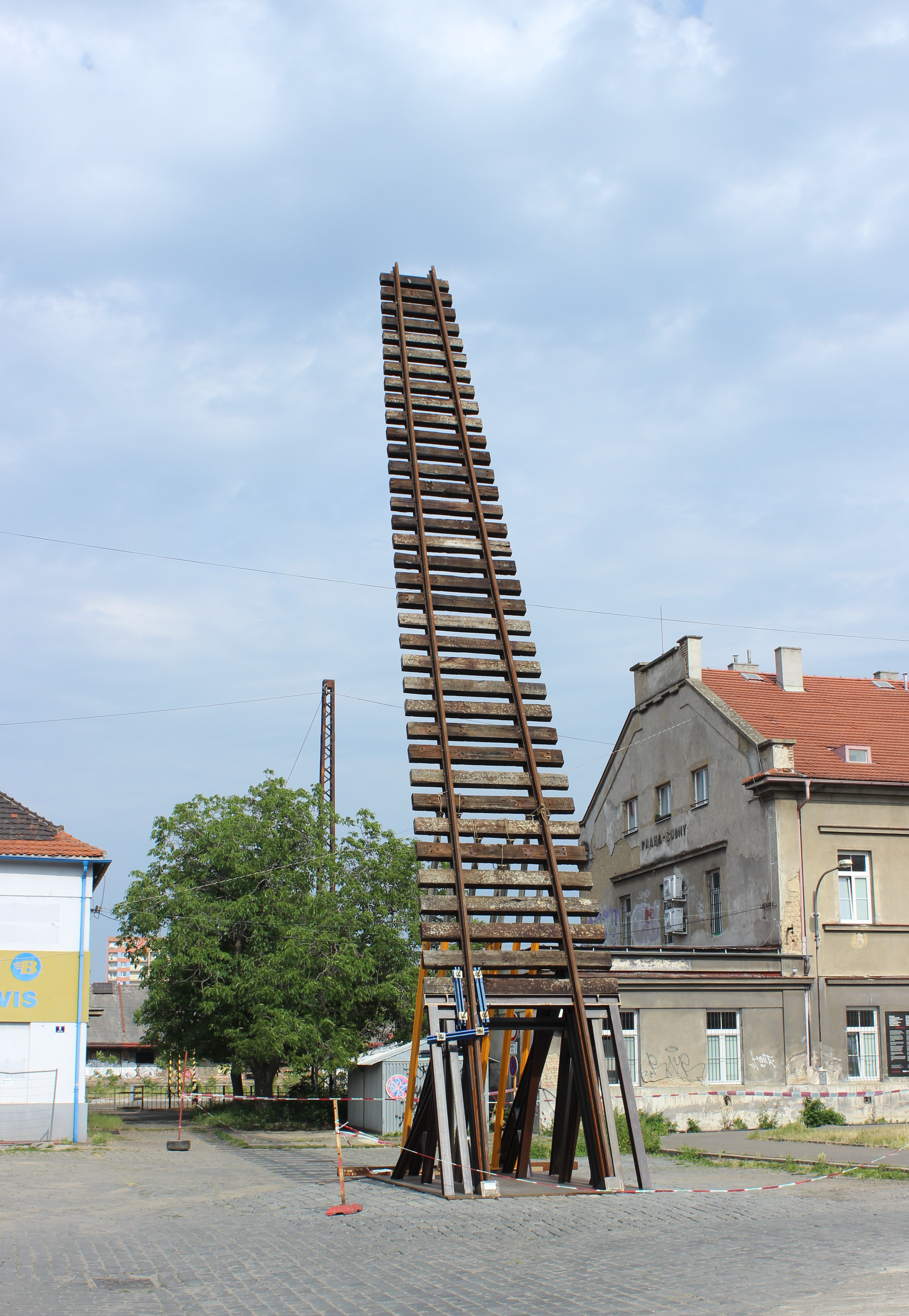
Gate of No Return, a memorial at Praha–Bubny railway station commemorating the deportation of tens of thousands of Jews via the station

The Holocaust in Bohemia and Moravia resulted in the deportation, dispossession, and murder of most of the pre-World War II population of Jews in the Czech lands that were annexed by Nazi Germany between 1939 and 1945. By 1946, only about 14,000 of the pre-war population of 118,000 remained.

Before the Holocaust, the Jews of Bohemia were among the most assimilated and integrated Jewish communities in Europe; antisemitic prejudice was less pronounced than elsewhere on the continent. The first anti-Jewish laws in Czechoslovakia were imposed following the 1938 Munich Agreement and the German occupation of the Sudetenland. In March 1939, Germany invaded and partially annexed the rest of the Czech lands as the Protectorate of Bohemia and Moravia. More anti-Jewish measures followed, imposed mainly by the Protectorate administration (which included both German and Czech officials). Jews were stripped of their employment and property, required to perform forced labor, and subject to discriminatory regulations, including, in September 1941, the requirement to wear a yellow star. Many were evicted from their homes and concentrated into substandard housing.

About 30,000 Jews, from the pre-invasion population of 118,310, managed to emigrate. Most of the remaining Jews were deported to other Nazi-controlled territories, starting in October 1939 as part of the Nisko plan. In October 1941, mass deportations of the Protectorate Jews began, initially to Łódź Ghetto. Beginning in November 1941, the transports departed for Theresienstadt Ghetto in the Protectorate, which was, for most, a temporary stopping-point before deportation to other ghettos, extermination camps, and other killing sites farther east. By mid-1943, most of the Jews remaining in the Protectorate were in mixed marriages and therefore exempt from deportation.

About 80,000 Jews from Bohemia and Moravia were murdered in the Holocaust. After the war, surviving Jews—especially those who had identified as Germans before the war—faced obstacles in regaining their property and pressure to assimilate into the Czech majority. Most Jews emigrated; a few were deported as part of the expulsion of Germans from Czechoslovakia. The memory of the Holocaust was suppressed in Communist Czechoslovakia, but resurfaced in public discourse after the fall of the Iron Curtain in 1989.

== Background ==
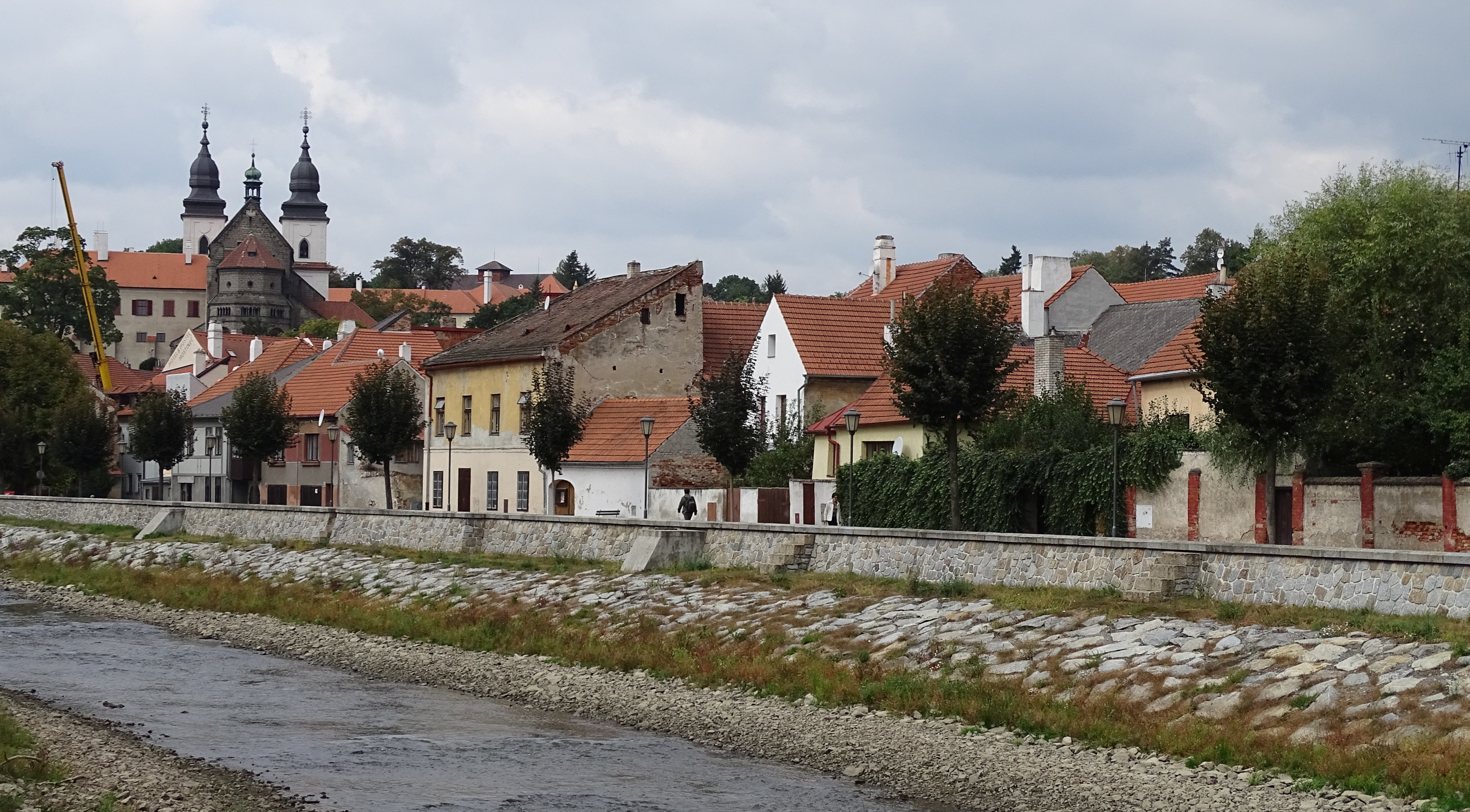
Jewish Quarter of Třebíč, Moravia, recognized as a UNESCO World Heritage Site

The first Jewish communities in Bohemia and Moravia were probably established by the eleventh century, under the rule of the Přemyslid dynasty. Jews were expelled from most of the royal cities in the fifteenth and sixteenth centuries at the demand of burghers because of economic rivalries and religious tensions. From 1526, Bohemia and Moravia were under the rule of the Habsburg monarchy. In 1557, Ferdinand I expelled the Jews from Bohemia, but not Moravia, although this decree was never fully enforced. Full freedom of residence was granted in 1623, but reversed by the Familiants Law (in effect 1726 to 1848) that restricted Jewish settlement to 8,541 families in Bohemia and 5,106 families in Moravia. Some Jews emigrated and others dispersed to small villages to evade the restrictions. Legal equality of the Czech Jews was granted in a series of reforms between 1841 and 1867. In the late nineteenth and early twentieth century, thousands of Jews came to Prague and other large cities in Bohemia and Moravia from small villages and towns.

Most Jews in Bohemia and Moravia spoke German as their primary language and identified with German culture at a time of increasing national conflict between Germans and Czechs in the nineteenth century. Over time, many Jews in Bohemia switched to Czech, which was the majority by the 1910 census, but German remained preferred by Jews living in Moravia and Czech Silesia. Following the end of World War I in 1918, Bohemia and Moravia – including the border Sudetenland, which had an ethnic-German majority – became part of the new country of Czechoslovakia. Of the 10 million inhabitants of the Czech lands, including the Sudetenland, Jews composed about 1 per cent (117,551) according to the 1930 census. At this time, most Jews lived in large cities such as Prague (35,403 Jews, who made up 4.2 per cent of the population), Brno (11,103, 4.2 per cent), and Moravská Ostrava (6,865, 5.5 per cent).

Between 1917 and 1920, anti-Jewish rioting occurred and many Jews experienced prejudice in their daily life. Antisemitism in the Czech lands was lower than elsewhere in Central and Eastern Europe and was a marginal phenomenon after 1920. Following a steep decline in religious observance in the nineteenth century, most Bohemian Jews were indifferent to religion, although this was less true in Moravia. Secularism among both Jews and non-Jews facilitated integration. The Jews of Bohemia had the highest rate of intermarriage in Europe; between 1928 and 1933, 43.8 per cent of Bohemian and 30 per cent of Moravian Jews married a non-Jewish partner. The high rate of integration later led to difficulties identifying Czech Jews for deportation and murder.

== German annexation ==
German occupation of Czechoslovakia in 1938 and 1939

Czechoslovakia accepted thousands of German Jews fleeing Germany after the Nazi seizure of power in 1933. Right-wing politics led to immigration restrictions, and after 1935 racial persecution was no longer regarded as a reason for granting asylum. At the same time, antisemitism was on the rise in Czechoslovakia. In February 1938, many Jews with Polish citizenship, including long-term residents, were expelled to Poland from Moravská Ostrava. Some of them were immediately sent back by the Polish police; others were left stranded along the border, where some died. After the German annexation of Austria in March 1938, all Austrian refugees were denied entry. Polish Jews deported from Austria were shuttled to the Polish border.

In September 1938, the Munich Agreement resulted in the annexation of the Sudetenland by Germany. About 200,000 people fled or were expelled from the annexed areas to the remainder of Czechoslovakia, including more than 90 percent of the 30,000 resident Jews. The Czechoslovak authorities tried to prevent Jews from crossing the new border even though the Munich Agreement gave these Jews the option to retain their Czechoslovak citizenship. Some of the Jewish refugees had to wait for days along the border. Although ethnically Czech refugees were welcomed and integrated, Jews and antifascist Germans were pressured to immediately leave. The arrival of German-speaking Jewish refugees contributed to a rise in antisemitism in the rump state of Czechoslovakia, tied up with a changing definition of nationality and citizenship that became ethnically exclusive.

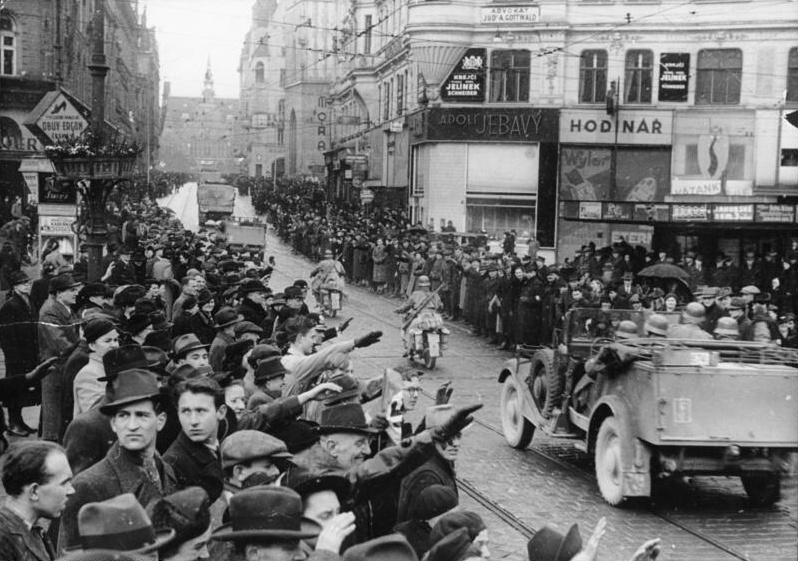
German troops greeted by civilians making Nazi salutes in Freedom Square, Brno, 16 March 1939

In mid-December, Rudolf Beran, prime minister of the authoritarian, ethnonationalist government of the Second Czechoslovak Republic, announced that he intended to "solve the Jewish question". In January 1939, Jews who had immigrated to Czechoslovakia after 1914, including naturalized citizens, were ordered to be deported from the country. Foreigners who were not ethnically Czech, Slovak, or Rusyn were required to leave the country within six months, and the Czechoslovak citizenship of Jewish refugees from the Sudetenland was systematically denied. This denaturalization was halted in mid-1939 by the German occupation authorities, because it hampered Jews from emigrating abroad. Jews were banned from the civil service and excluded from professional associations and educational institutions; state hospitals dismissed Jewish doctors, and Jewish army officers were put on leave. The Second Republic's persecution of Jews had domestic origins and did not result from external pressure.

On 14 March 1939, the Slovak State declared independence with German support. Germany invaded the Czech rump state, establishing the Protectorate of Bohemia and Moravia. This nominally autonomous protectorate was partially annexed into the Greater German Reich. The Protectorate was allowed to govern itself, within the parameters set by the German occupiers. The Second Republic administration largely remained in place, although it only had jurisdiction over Czechs and Jews, who were counted as Protectorate subjects, a second-class status. Ethnic Germans were granted Reich citizenship and were accountable only to German authorities. Both the Protectorate's Prime Minister Alois Eliáš (starting in April) and President Emil Hácha were conservative Catholics who approved anti-Jewish measures while retaining contact with the Czechoslovak government-in-exile; the Protectorate justice minister, Jaroslav Krejčí, was known for his pro-Nazi sentiments. In March, Hácha formed the National Partnership, a political organization to which all adult male Czech Protectorate subjects were required to belong – women and Jews were forbidden from joining. The German administration was controlled by Reich Protector Konstantin von Neurath, former foreign minister of Germany, and Karl Hermann Frank, formerly the deputy chairman of the Sudeten German Party.

== Persecution of Jews ==
The gradual persecution of Jews created a "ghetto without walls" and conditions that later enabled their deportation and murder. The phases of persecution before mass deportation were primarily carried out by the Protectorate administration, especially by local authorities, with some intervention from Berlin. Both German and Czech officials were involved. The historian Benjamin Frommer contends that the archival record shows that in some cases the participation of Czech local authorities in anti-Jewish measures far exceeded passive compliance with orders from above. He also found that in other cases local authorities reluctantly responded to demands to persecute Jews. According to the historian Wolf Gruner, careerism and potential for material gain were likely motives for Czech bureaucrats to implement anti-Jewish regulations. Some initiatives first applied in the Protectorate, such as the freezing of Jews' bank accounts, were later rolled out in other parts of Greater Germany.

=== Initial measures ===
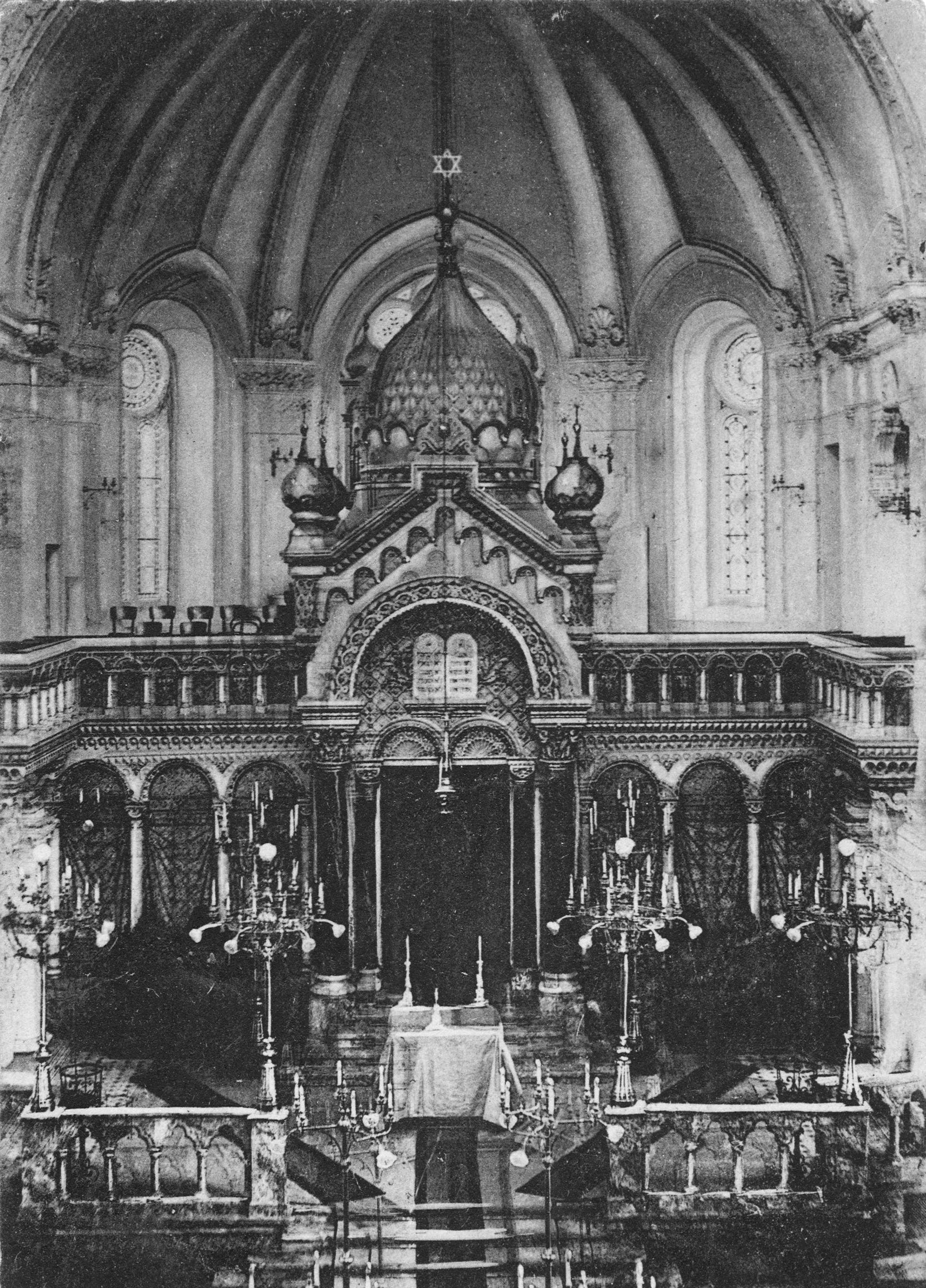
Interior of the Olomouc Synagogue, burned in March 1939

On 15 March 1939, 118,310 Jews were reported to be living in 136 recognized communities in the Protectorate. During the annexation, anti-Jewish riots occurred in several locations. In Olomouc, Vsetín, and Moravská Ostrava, synagogues were burned by German and Czech rioters. In Jihlava, Jews were prohibited from riding streetcars (trams) and forced to clear snow from the streets. Prague Jewish organizations were shut down or taken over by the Gestapo. In the first week after the annexation there was a wave of suicides among Jews, 30–40 reported each day in Prague. A wave of arrests targeted thousands of left-wing activists and German refugees. More than a thousand were deported to concentration camps in the Reich. In September 1939, another wave of arrests targeted Protectorate citizens who could be used as hostages and those with ties to Poland. These arrests disproportionately targeted Jews, who made up 22 percent of the 8,000 people arrested during the first months of Nazi rule.

Following the establishment of the Protectorate, the Nuremberg Laws were immediately applied to relationships between Jews and German-blooded people, forbidding relationships between them. Marriages between Jews and non-Jewish Czechs were initially still allowed. Professional restrictions imposed under the Second Republic intensified after the takeover. On 17 March, Beran's government announced a ban on Jews practicing a wide range of professions. On 25 March, the German Interior Ministry decided to delegate "whether and what measures it undertakes against the Jews" to the Protectorate government. In the following weeks, professional associations of merchants, lawyers and physicians decided to expel their Jewish members. By June, the umbrella Jewish organization reported that many middle-class Jews had lost their jobs. The Jewish Social Institute, a social welfare organization, was allowed to reopen on 6 April and provided relief to many unemployed Jews as well as refugees.

The Eliáš government drafted anti-Jewish legislation, which would have defined a Jew as someone with four Jewish grandparents who had belonged to a Jewish community after 1918. Jews would be barred from working in public agencies, corporations, schools, administrations, courts, stock exchanges, the arts, and medicine. The Reich Protector's office dismissed the proposal as too mild in its definition of Jew, and therefore issued its own resolution on 21 June adopting the same definition as the Nuremberg Laws—anyone with three Jewish grandparents was a Jew. Part of the Czech government's calculation in arguing for a narrower definition of Jew was to reduce the amount of Jewish property that would be transferred to Germans as a result of Aryanization. Little irregular anti-Jewish violence took place during much of 1939, with the exception of a second wave of arson attacks against synagogues in May and June—in Brno, Olomouc, Uherský Brod, Chlumec, Náchod, Pardubice, and Moravská Ostrava.

=== Emigration ===
Fourteen thousand Jews, disproportionately those from the Sudetenland, emigrated after the Munich Agreement and before the March 1939 invasion. Many Jews were reluctant to leave family members behind or try to start a new life in a country where they did not know the language. Another challenge was that most Jews were unable to emigrate because of immigration restrictions, and other countries' quotas were already filled by German and Austrian Jews. Some desperate parents agreed to send their children to the United Kingdom on the Kindertransport, which took 669 Jewish children from Bohemia and Moravia before the outbreak of war. The growing poverty among Jews caused by anti-Jewish restrictions was another barrier to their emigration, which was banned by the Security Service (SD) in May 1939 to prioritize the emigration of German Jews. The emigration ban was lifted in July and a Prague branch of the Central Office for Jewish Emigration was set up the same month. The Central Office initially only had jurisdiction over Prague and its surroundings, and in March 1940 it was extended to the entire Protectorate.

Proportionately fewer Jews were able to escape from the Protectorate than from prewar Germany or Austria, due to the narrower window for legal emigration. According to official figures, 26,111 emigrated, almost half of these for other European destinations, where some were killed in countries that were later occupied by Germany. An unknown number fled illegally to Poland in 1939 or to Germany's allies Slovakia and Hungary. The historian Hillel J. Kieval estimates that this illegal emigration amounted to several thousand Jews, many of whom joined Czechoslovak military formations abroad. In February 1940, working-age Jews were barred from emigrating from the Protectorate; by this time, hardly any destinations were open except Shanghai. All Jewish emigration was banned throughout the Reich on 16 October 1941.

=== Nisko Plan ===
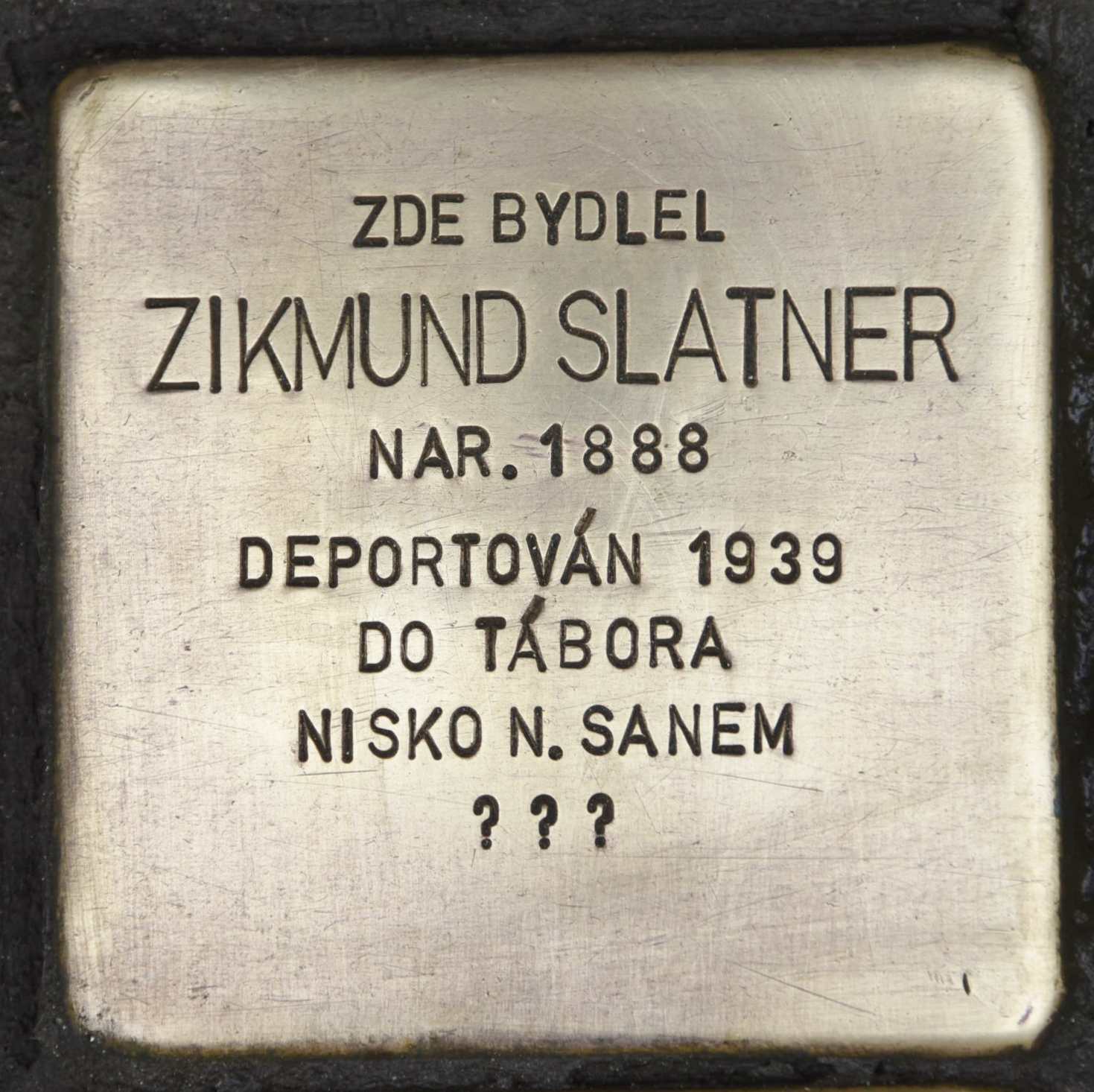
Stolperstein for a deportee from Moravská Ostrava

The outbreak of World War II with the September 1939 invasion of Poland dramatically changed the situation of Czech Jews. The Nisko Plan was a scheme to concentrate Jews in the Lublin District, at the time the most remote area of German-occupied Europe and adjacent to the new border with the Soviet Union created by the partition of Poland. The Nisko operation targeted the border areas as a first step toward the deportation of all 2 million Jews in Greater Germany to be completed by April 1940.

On 18 October 1939, 901 men were deported from Moravská Ostrava to Nisko. Border police and SS personnel accompanied the transport. A second transport carried 400 Jewish men from Moravská Ostrava and was accompanied by a demonstration of Czechs. A third took 300 men from Prague on 1 November, and was also protested by Czechs. The train was turned around in Sosnowiec and its passengers returned home when the Nisko Plan was cancelled. SS chief Heinrich Himmler called off the deportation because it conflicted with the higher-priority goal of resettling ethnic Germans in the Warthegau and West Prussia in German–occupied Poland. Instead, the Jewish population of Greater Germany was to be reduced through forced emigration. The deportees were dumped in and around Nisko to fend for themselves. Harsh conditions prompted some to flee across the border into the Soviet Union; 123 deportees returned to Czechoslovakia in 1945 with Svoboda's Army. In April 1940, the camp was dissolved and the 460 survivors from the Protectorate were allowed to return home.

=== Property confiscation ===
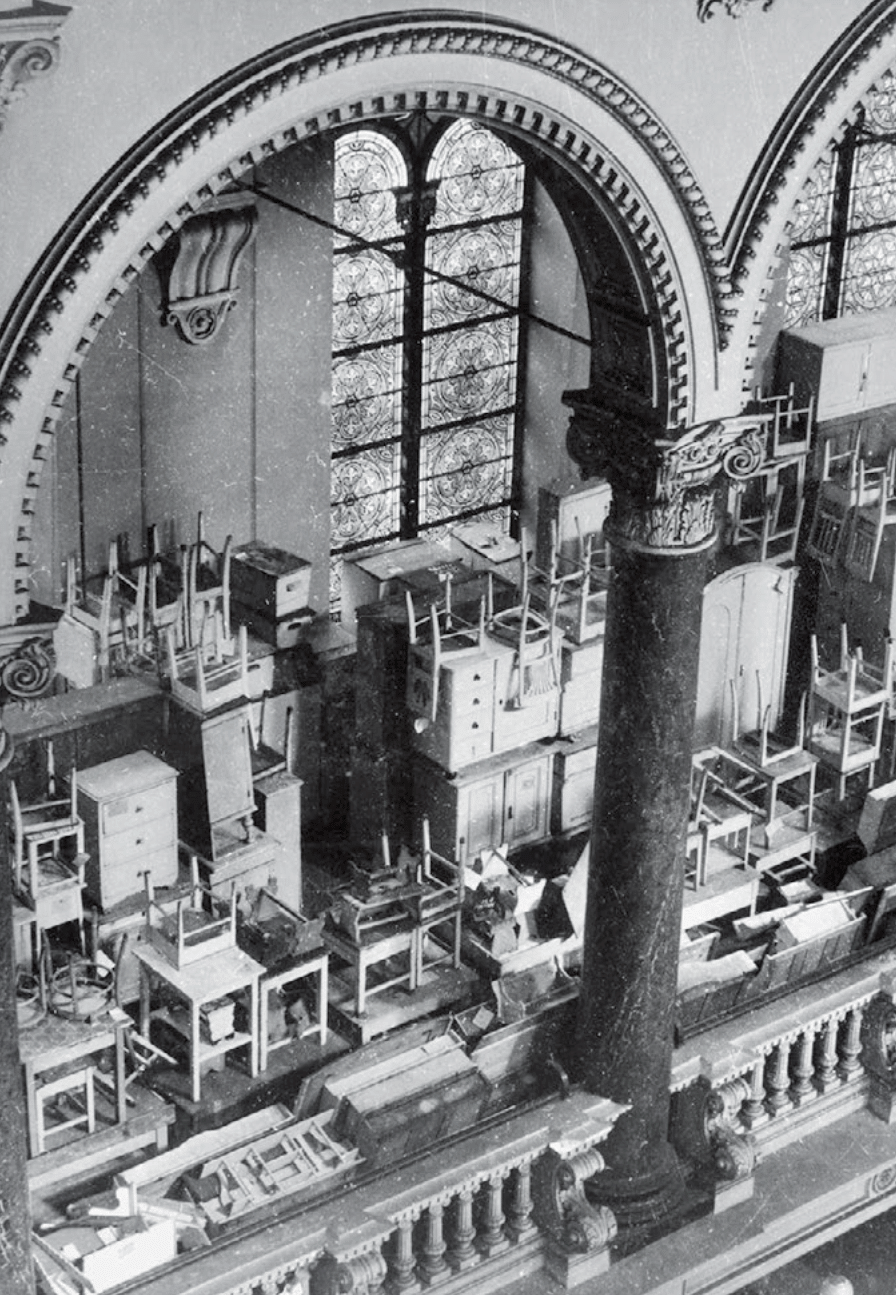
Furniture confiscated from deported Jews in a synagogue, 1944

To avoid chaotic property transfers as had taken place in Vienna after the German annexation of Austria, all property confiscation (known as Aryanization) from Jews in the Protectorate was required to take place with the approval of the Reich Ministry of the Economy. After the foundation of the Protectorate, Jews were forbidden to sell companies and real estate. Czechs and Germans fought over who would have the right to take over the 30,000 Jewish-owned businesses in the Protectorate. The Germans were favored and property confiscation was even extended to some businesses owned by Czechs, leading Hácha to complain of "Germanization under the cloak of Aryanization". On 21 June, simultaneously as the occupiers decided to establish the Central Office, the Reich Protector announced that all Jewish property was claimed by Germany. Sales of property were used to fund emigration of Jews; the decree also frustrated Czech efforts to seize Jewish-owned businesses.

In early 1940, the elimination of Jewish businesses accelerated with new ordinances from the Reich Protector preventing Jews from running businesses in several sectors of the economy and requiring all Jewish-owned businesses to register their assets. Some businesses were sold to non-Jews, often for a fraction of their value, and others were closed down. The Protectorate police began to shut down Jewish-owned stores. By this time, most Jewish businesses were run by trustees.

Jews' bank accounts were frozen on 25 March 1939 by Protectorate finance minister Josef Kalfus. All private property had to be registered by 1 August 1939. Initially estimated at 14 billion koruna the value of Jewish property had fallen to 3 billion koruna by that time according to contemporary newspaper reports. (Note: Equivalent to $350 million and $75 million US dollars at the time or $8 billion and $2 billion today.) By 1940 an increasing number of Jews were selling their property because of poverty or as a first step towards emigration. Couples in which one partner was Jewish, especially those in which the other was an ethnic German, faced pressure to divorce. Some opted for a paper divorce to preserve the family property under the non-Jewish partner's name, or the job of the non-Jewish partner, while continuing to live together. The divorce removed the Jewish partner's exemption from deportation.

Before the Nazi occupation, many municipalities wanted to acquire Jewish synagogues, cemeteries, and other community property for public use or housing. The Nazi authorities were disappointed that some Czech municipalities were able to acquire this property at a low or null price and insisted that municipalities seeking to acquire Jewish property pay the full value to the Central Office for Jewish Emigration. Despite this cost, some municipalities went ahead with these acquisitions; selling Jewish gravestones as building material was common. The confiscation of Jewish property was mostly complete by 1941.

=== Employment and forced labor ===
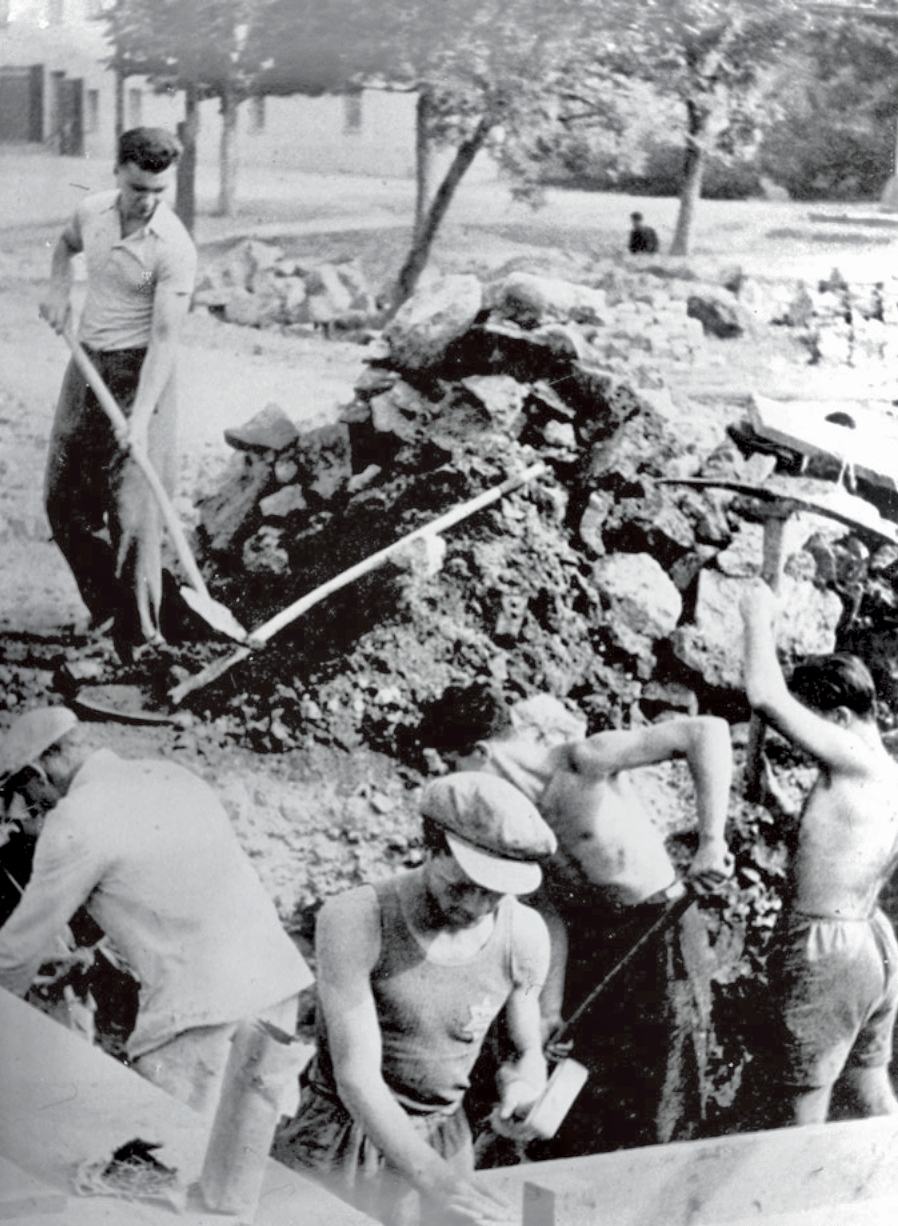
Forced labor of roadbuilding, 1943

By mid-1939, their exclusion from state employment and professional associations left few jobs open to Jews besides manual labor. At the time, 25,458 men and 24,028 women were of working age (18–45 years). On 23 October, another order from the Reich Protector barred Jews from salaried employment. Further employment regulations were announced on 26 January 1940, with the result that Jews were banned from all management positions among other provisions. Increasing numbers of Jews were without employment or income. On 24 April Jews were barred from working in law, education, pharmacies, medicine, or publishing. The forced unemployment of Jews led to tremendous pressure on the Jewish community's welfare rolls, which it attempted to counter by retraining Jews in agriculture and skilled crafts via the Protectorate labor offices.

In mid-1940, despite the increasing unemployment among Jews, the central authorities did not introduce any generalized forced labor program. Instead, municipalities took the initiative and developed a forced labor program similar to that in Germany and Austria, but organized locally. In early July 1940, the town of Holešov requested permission to conscript its Jews into forced labor. A report in Neuer Tag magazine encouraged other localities to follow this practice. By July, 60 percent of Jewish men in the Protectorate were employed in forced labor projects and the remainder were in independent employment that had not yet been barred to them. Unlike in Germany and Austria, Jews were initially not segregated from Czechs when undertaking forced labor, as both were considered inferior to Germans.

In early 1941 forced labor intensified as many municipalities, including Prague, hired Jews at minimal wages to clear snow. The Jewish communities were ordered to judge the fitness for work of all men aged 18 to 50. By mid-1941, more than 11,700 of the 15,000 eligible Jewish men were engaged in a variety of forced labor projects, initially focused on agriculture and construction and later on industry and forestry. Segregated labor details were introduced in the first half of 1941. Forced labor deployments were further intensified in early 1942 despite the beginning of systematic deportation from the Protectorate. The forced laborer population peaked in May 1942, at which point 15,000 men and 1,000 women were deployed. After that, increasing recruitment of women and the less physically able was not able to compensate for the losses to deportation. Many forced laborers did not receive sufficient wages to cover their basic needs, and therefore still required welfare paid by the Jewish community. Many Jews suffered health problems as a result of poor conditions and insufficient nutrition.

=== Restrictions on civil rights ===
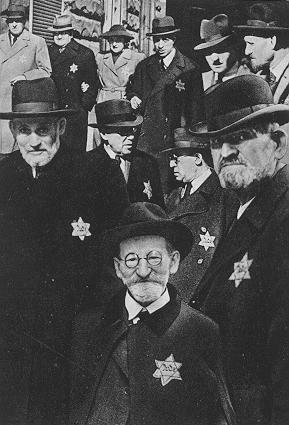
Jews wearing yellow badges in Prague, c. 1942

In January 1940, the remit of the Prague Central Office was extended to the entire Protectorate. In March, it obtained control of all Jewish communities, to which all those classified as Jewish according to the Nuremberg Laws were ordered to report even if they were not members of the Jewish community. Jews' freedom of movement was restricted by the Hácha government with a curfew imposed at 20:00, and a ban on visiting cinemas and theaters. Protectorate identification cards for Jews were stamped with the red letter "J". In August 1940, Jews were banned by order of the Reich Protector from all voting rights and public office, all positions involving the media and public opinion, and all Czech associations. Jews were also restricted from shopping except for a few hours of the day from mid-1940, and eventually businesses had to choose whether to serve exclusively Jewish or non-Jewish customers. Jews were banned from attending German schools in March 1939, and in August 1940 the Czech government banned Jewish students from the Czech schools as well. Prohibition of private tutoring of Jewish students followed, and in July 1942 all education for Jewish students was banned.

From 1939, the Reich Protector received many petitions demanding that Jews be required to wear special markings such as a yellow star or armband. Even though Jews were so marked in the former Polish regions annexed into Nazi Germany, this was not initially approved for Bohemia and Moravia. The yellow star was introduced in Bohemia and Moravia at the same time as in Germany, in September 1941. Earlier, lack of distinction between Jews and other residents made it difficult to enforce anti-Jewish laws; the enforced wearing of the star made it easier to target Jews for antisemitic violence. The wearing of the star was the most vigorously enforced anti-Jewish law, and violators could be deported to a concentration camp. Later in September, high-ranking SS functionary Reinhard Heydrich was appointed Reich Protector and deposed the Czech government under Eliáš, replacing him with the hardliner Krejči. One of Heydrich's first actions as Reich Protector, on 1 October, was to shut down all synagogues.

Because the Nazis viewed Jews in racial terms, individuals of Jewish ancestry who did not identify as Jews were forced to register with the Jewish community as B-Jews. In March 1941 there were 12,680 B-Jews living in the Protectorate, the majority of them Christians. In November 1940, the Hácha government passed a ban on marriages between ethnic Czechs and Jews. The Nazi authorities repeatedly refused to publish the decree, which did not go into effect until March 1942. In late 1941 and early 1942, some Jews took advantage of this loophole to evade deportation by marrying a Czech. The longer that the war went on, the longer and more bizarre the list of prohibitions intended to make life difficult for Jews became.

=== Ghettoization ===
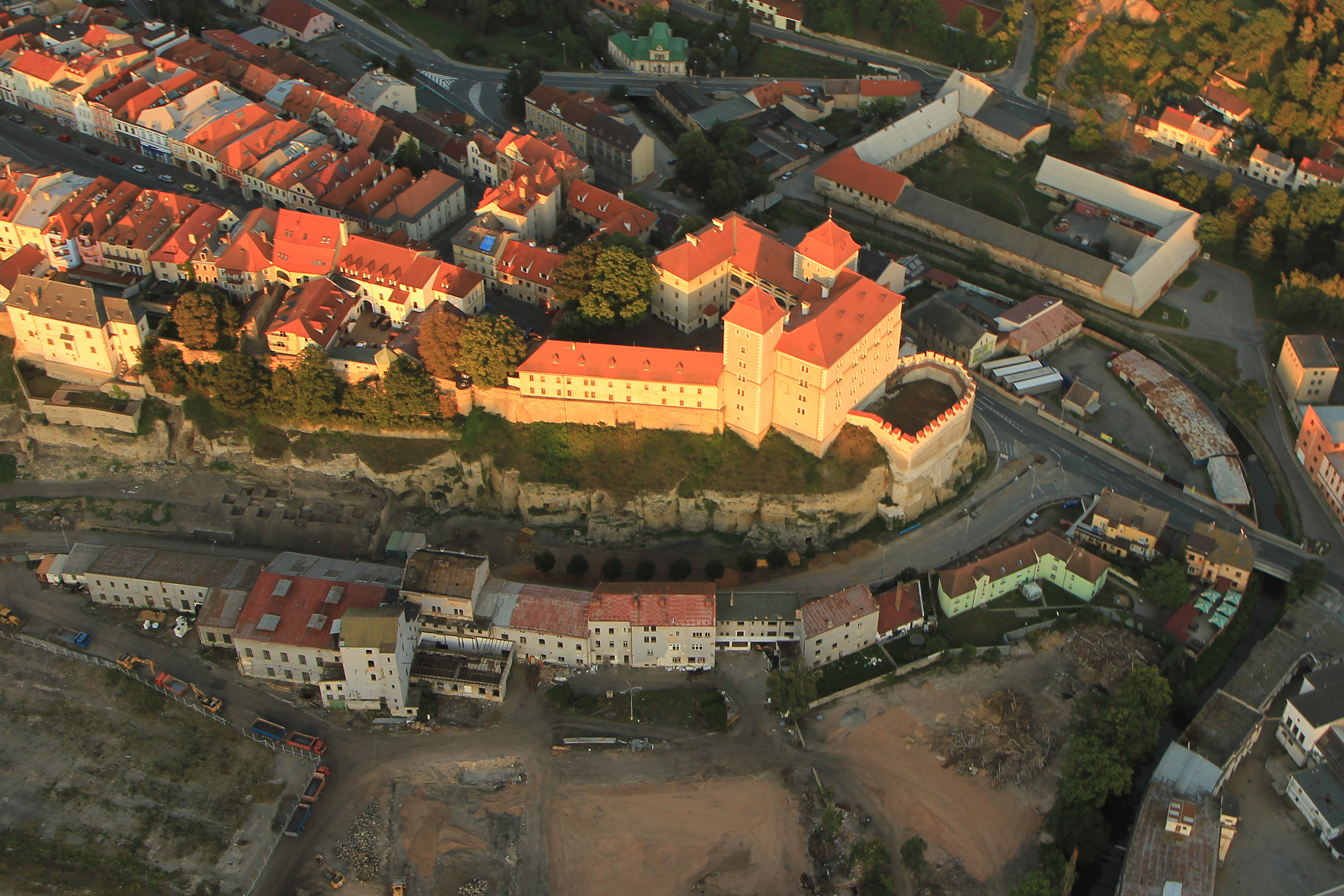
Mladá Boleslav castle (center), where 250 Jews were imprisoned in 1940

During the first years of the German occupation, many Jews moved to Prague to apply for visas to foreign countries, and others headed to the countryside to evade anti-Jewish restrictions or obtain goods on the black market. In 1940 and 1941, public transit restrictions were imposed both in Prague and other municipalities. Jews were either restricted to the last car of streetcars or banned from public transport entirely. Restrictions were also imposed on leaving the municipality of residence or moving to a different address without the permission of the authorities.

In mid-1939, it was first proposed by German officials (Oberlandräte) that parts of Bohemia and Moravia be made Jew-free, by deporting Jews to Prague. Later that year, Jews from Německý Brod, Pelhřimov, Kamenice nad Lipou, Humpolec, Ledeč nad Sázavou, České Budějovice, and other municipalities were expelled to Prague on short notice. In early 1940, municipalities began to pressure Jews to vacate their homes and relocate to less desirable housing in the same town. The first internal expulsion of Jews was in 1940 from Mladá Boleslav when at the orders of the Oberlandrat of Jičín 250 Jews were imprisoned in a nearby castle. Later expulsions targeted Jews living in the city of Jihlava and the Zlín region outside of Uherský Brod, where Jews were forced into a ghetto. In late 1940, twenty-five municipalities forced their Jewish residents to leave their homes and live in abandoned castles or factories. Forced relocation disrupted prewar social ties with non-Jews and reduced the ability to cope with anti-Jewish regulations. Due to increasing poverty, by 1940 Czech Jews were suffering from tuberculosis at ten times the average rate for Central Europe.

In late 1940, Jewish-owned housing in Prague and Brno was registered by the Central Office. By early the next year, Jews were being concentrated into Judenhäuser (lit. 'Jew houses') in Prague, a joint initiative by the city government, the Central Office, and the Nazi Party. This primarily entailed moving Jews from peripheral districts of Prague into older housing, already occupied by other Jews, in the center of the city, especially Josefov and the Old Town. Thousands of Jews were evicted from flats around the city and most had to resettle in one-room sub-tenancies. By September 1941, there were an average of twelve people living in each two-room apartment. That month, Heydrich launched the final phase of the ghettoization, forcing Jews into a smaller number of towns and cities to make it easier to deport them. The National Partnership demanded further ghettoization of Jews; in October 1941, Hácha presented such demands to the Reich Protector. These were rejected as the Germans were already planning the systematic deportation of Jews.

== Responses to persecution ==
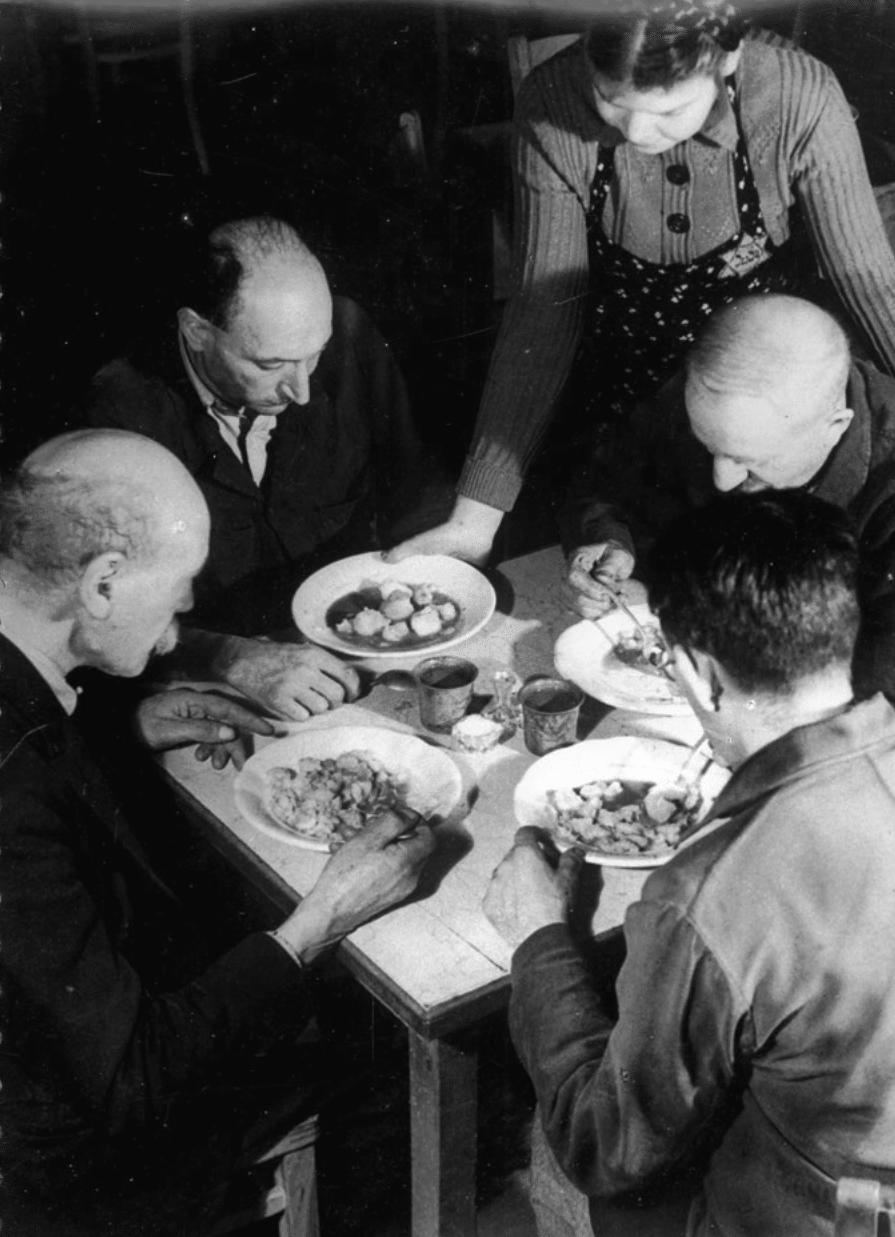
Jews eating at a community soup kitchen, 1943 or earlier

The majority of non-Jewish Czechs felt sympathy for Jews and did not collaborate with the Nazis, which was repeatedly emphasized in the wartime Western press. In 1940, an antisemitic faction took over the leadership of the National Partnership and issued decrees that forbade non-Jewish Czechs from associating with Jews, but the decrees were widely ignored and most were repealed following a public outcry. Defiance of antisemitic decrees, as well as the public protests against the Nisko deportations in 1939, was closely related to opposition to the German occupation. Non-Jewish Czechs worried that after the Jews were eliminated, they would be next. The Security Service reported that during 1941, "the Czech attitude towards the Jews became a serious problem for the occupation authorities". Even some Czech resistance figures published antisemitic articles.

A minority of Czechs took part in the persecution of Jews. Though committed fascists and antisemites were few, they had a disproportionate influence on the Protectorate's anti-Jewish policy. The Czech fascist newspapers Vlajka and Arijský boj ("Aryan Struggle"—a Czech version of the Nazi newspaper Der Stürmer) were noted for their antisemitic invective and for publishing denunciations of Jews and Jew-lovers. Frommer has argued that these newspapers made it easier for some ordinary Czechs to denounce their neighbors, by providing an alternative to the Nazi authorities. Arijský boj received 60 denunciations daily in October 1941; such denunciations often resulted in the arrest of Jews for breaking the regulations. Those who sent in denunciations helped enforce the laws by reporting alleged violations. The Security Service reported that some non-Jewish Czechs tried to help Jews avoid deportation. In 1943, it reported that attitudes had changed and non-Jewish Czechs were grateful that the occupiers had rid them of the Jewish population. The resistance also reported to the government-in-exile that some Czechs believed that the Jews deserved their fate.

Jewish leaders attempted to mitigate persecution by helping Jews emigrate and providing welfare and labor assignments to those made destitute by confiscation of their property and exclusion from the labor market. The Jewish communities also attempted to mitigate persecution by setting different agencies against each other. Individual Jews resisted in several ways, such as refusing to obey anti-Jewish restrictions, buying goods on the black market, not wearing the yellow star. Some deserted from forced labor or evaded deportation. Others helped Jews emigrate or joined the resistance. Hundreds of Jews were punished for their resistance to persecution, which could range from fines to a prison sentence, deportation to a concentration camp, or execution. More than a thousand people classified as Jews petitioned to be recognized as honorary Aryans, but all these petitions were denied.

== Systematic deportation ==
=== Direct transports ===
On 16 or 17 September 1941, Hitler approved a proposal to deport 60,000 Jews from the Reich and the Protectorate to Łódź Ghetto, in the Warthegau. In preparation for the deportation, another census was carried out. By the criteria of the Nuremberg Laws, 88,000 Jews still lived in the Protectorate, 46,800 in Prague. Heydrich, Frank, Horst Böhme, and Adolf Eichmann met at Prague Castle on 10 October to finalize deportation plans. They decided that 5,000 Jews would be deported from Prague from 15 October, initially to Nazi ghettos where they would perform forced labor. Upon their deportation, Jews' remaining property would be expropriated. Due to overcrowding in the Łódź Ghetto, and partly to make space for the new arrivals, Kulmhof extermination camp was opened in late 1941.

Panic and a wave of suicides broke out in Prague and Brno in early October with the announcement of a mass deportation to an unknown destination. Many deportees were only given one night to report for deportation, and at most a few days. In Prague the deportation of the city's 46,801 Jews stretched over more than two years, but elsewhere in the Protectorate (except for Brno) all Jews were deported from a locality within a few days. In Prague, deportees had to gather in the Trade Fair Palace in Holešovice where they had to sleep on the floor in unheated wooden barracks for several days. The SS stole their remaining belongings and beat some prisoners to death. Transports, each carrying 1,000 Jews, departed from Prague on 16, 21, 26 and 30 October and 3 November, arriving in Łódź the next day. These transports were organized by the Central Office and the Gestapo, the latter being responsible for drawing up transport lists. Hitler designated Minsk and Riga as the destination for subsequent transports due to overcrowding in Łódź; on 16 November, a transport took Jews from Brno to Minsk.

Many deportees to Łódź perished from the poor living conditions in the ghetto. Others died in labor camps in western Poland or after deportation to the extermination camps at Kulmhof, Majdanek or Auschwitz; only around 250 of the 5,000 Jews deported to Łódź survived the war. From the transport to Minsk, about 750 of the deportees were murdered in a mass execution on 27–29 July 1942; only 12 returned after the war. Following the assassination of Reinhard Heydrich on 27 May 1942, martial law was declared in the Protectorate. Hundreds of people, especially Jews, were executed on accusations of sabotage, treason and economic crimes. On 10 June, 1,000 Jews were deported from Prague; some were removed from the transport at Majdanek and others were deported to Ujazdów near Sobibor extermination camp; only one man survived. On 27 October 1944, 18 leaders of the Prague Jewish Community were deported directly to Auschwitz and murdered.

=== Theresienstadt Ghetto ===
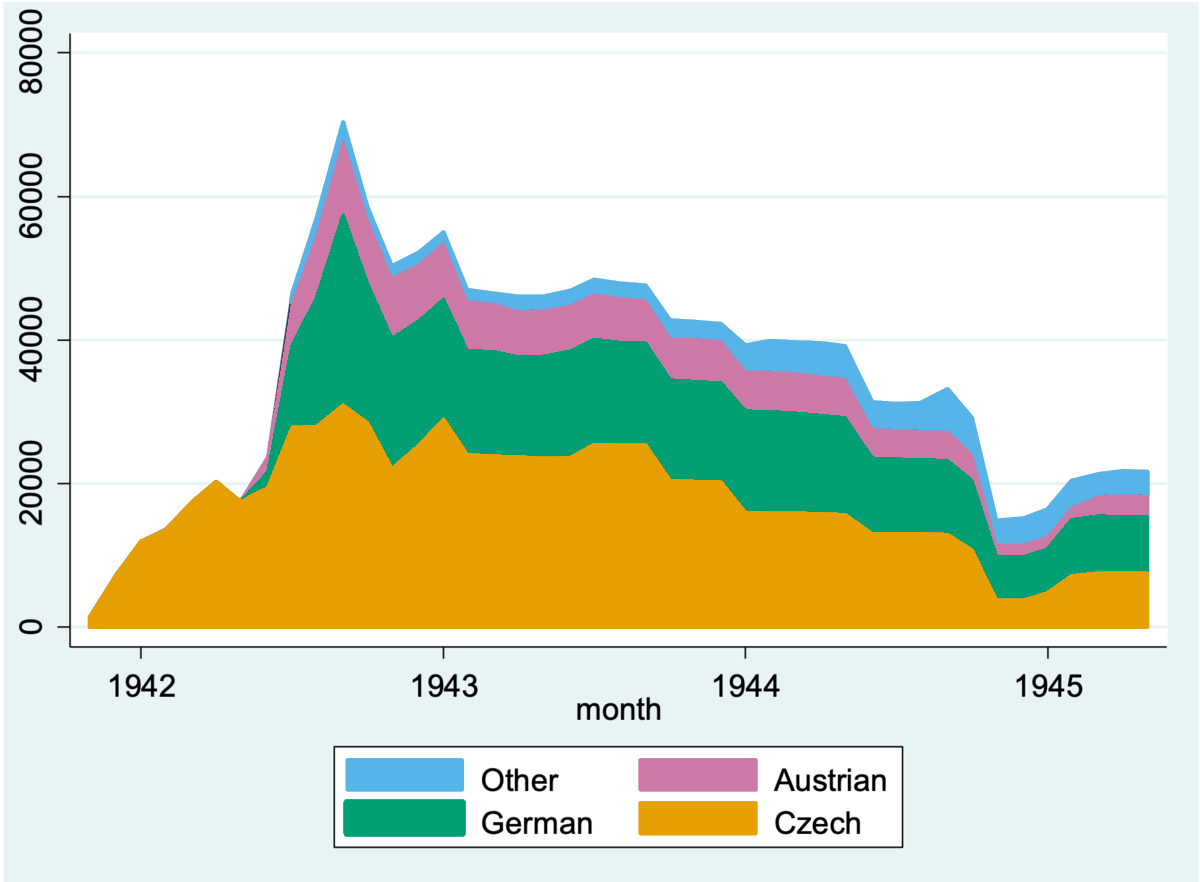
Theresienstadt Ghetto population by country of origin. The original population was 3,500 soldiers and 3,700 civilians.

In October 1941, the Prague Jewish Community was ordered to prepare for the deportation of the remaining Jews to locations within the Protectorate. The site chosen was Theresienstadt (Terezín) a walled fortress town north of Prague on the border with the Sudetenland. Deportation to Theresienstadt began in November 1941 with a transport of 350 men from Prague. The next month, more than 7,000 people were deported to Theresienstadt, from Prague, Pilsen, Brno, and other places. Deportees were permitted to bring only 50 kilograms (110 lb) of personal items, which were ultimately stolen. The ghetto was furnished with property that had earlier been confiscated from Jews and funded by confiscated assets and the proceeds of inmates' forced labor. From the outset, Theresienstadt was designated as a transit ghetto. The first transport from Theresienstadt left for Riga on 9 January 1942.

At the Wannsee Conference on 20 January, Heydrich announced that Theresienstadt was being prepared as an old-age ghetto for German Jews. This decision meant that the Czech Jews transported there had to be deported farther east. The original residents of Theresienstadt were expelled and the Germans among them received compensation from the Central Office out of the fund of confiscated Jewish property. On 29 May, two days after Heydrich's assassination by the Czech resistance, Jewish leaders were told to expect the deportation of all Jews living within Germany, Austria, and Bohemia and Moravia. Those older than 65 would stay in Theresienstadt and younger Jews would be deported to the East. Prisoners at Theresienstadt were used for forced labor inside the ghetto, and outside for projects including forestry, coal mining, and the ironworks in Prague. After the Lidice massacre in June 1942, a work detail of 30 Jews from Theresienstadt was forced to bury the victims.

Out of a total of 141,000 Jews deported to Theresienstadt, 73,608 were from the Protectorate. In the ghetto, about 33,000 people died of starvation and disease, caused by malnutrition and the cramped and unsanitary conditions. Between 9 January 1942 and 28 October 1944, about 60,000 of the Jews from the Protectorate were deported farther east to locations in Eastern Europe, about half to Auschwitz. Transports in September and December 1943 as well as May 1944 brought Jews from Theresienstadt to Theresienstadt family camp, a segregated area of Auschwitz II–Birkenau. On the night of 8–9 March 1944, 3,792 Jews from the family camp were murdered in the gas chambers—the largest single mass execution of Czechoslovak citizens during the war. The family camp was dissolved in July 1944, most prisoners being killed. After the war 10,818 Czech Jews returned from deportation to Theresienstadt, of whom 3,371 had been deported outside the Protectorate.

=== Remaining Jews ===
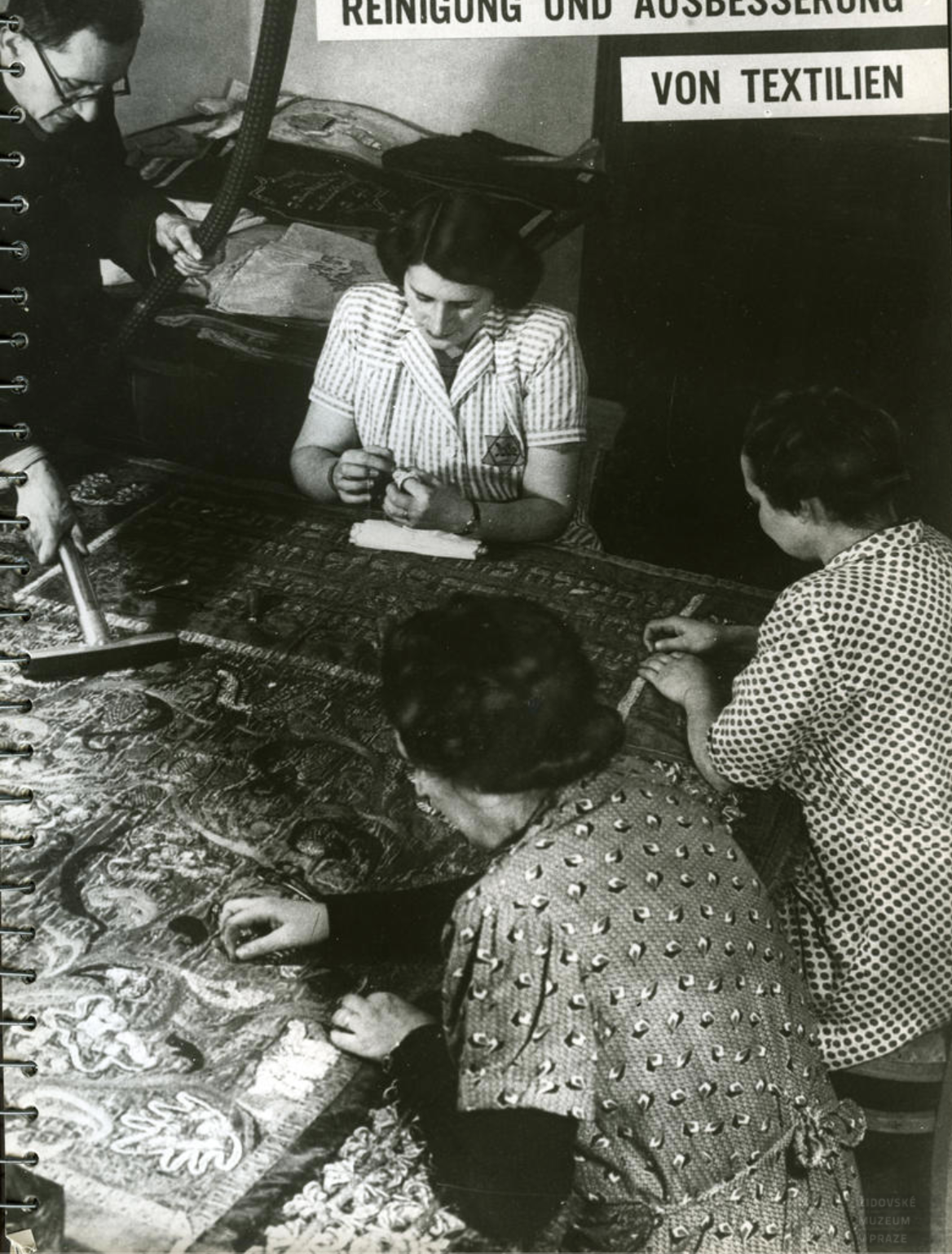
Jewish women sorting confiscated textiles, 1943

Property belonging to deported Jews was collected by the Trustee Office of the Prague Jewish Community for resale. At its height, hundreds of Jews worked for this office, gathering items such as clothing, furniture, tableware, and carpets, as well as hundreds of thousands of books and hundreds of pianos. There were more than fifty branch offices for dealing with the property of Jews outside of Prague. The items were categorized and valued for sale. After the Heydrich assassination, there was an intensified push to confiscate the last remaining property of families that had not yet been deported. In November 1942, a law was passed confiscating all the property of Jews deported from the Protectorate.

By June 1943, almost the entire Jewish population of the Protectorate had been deported; most of those left were in mixed marriages. Jews married to non-Jews and children under 14 with one Jewish parent were largely exempt from deportation. These couples faced increasing persecution and pressure to divorce, but many refused to do so. From March 1943, such Jews were subjected to forced labor duty. By 1944, 83.4 percent of Jews outside Theresienstadt were performing forced labor, the remainder being considered incapable of work. People of partial Jewish descent who were not deported were also drafted into forced labor programs. In mid-1944, non-Jewish husbands of Jewish women were summoned for forced labor. In September all able-bodied Jews from outside Prague were drafted into mica splitting at a camp in Hagibor, and many forced-labor camps outside the city were shut down.

Between June 1943 and January 1945, another 900 people were sent to Theresienstadt in small groups; these were primarily divorcés and widows of mixed marriages and offspring from such marriages who had reached 14 years of age. By the end of 1944, only 6,795 Jews officially lived in the Protectorate. Between January and 16 March 1945, 3,654 intermarried Jews and people of partial Jewish descent were deported to Theresienstadt; 2,803 Jews were allowed to remain in Prague through the end of the war.

Historians consider that hiding was relatively rare in the Protectorate, due to geographic, demographic, and political factors rather than Czech collaboration with the occupation. Czechs caught assisting Jews with forged papers or hiding places were sentenced to death. The exact number of Jews who survived in hiding in the Protectorate is unknown; H. G. Adler estimated it at 424. According to one estimate, some 1,100 Jews acquired false papers, but the majority left the Protectorate, either to be foreign workers in Germany or else to Slovakia or Hungary; not all of these survived the war. Those who had the greatest chance of surviving were the small group who had never been registered as Jews.

== Aftermath ==
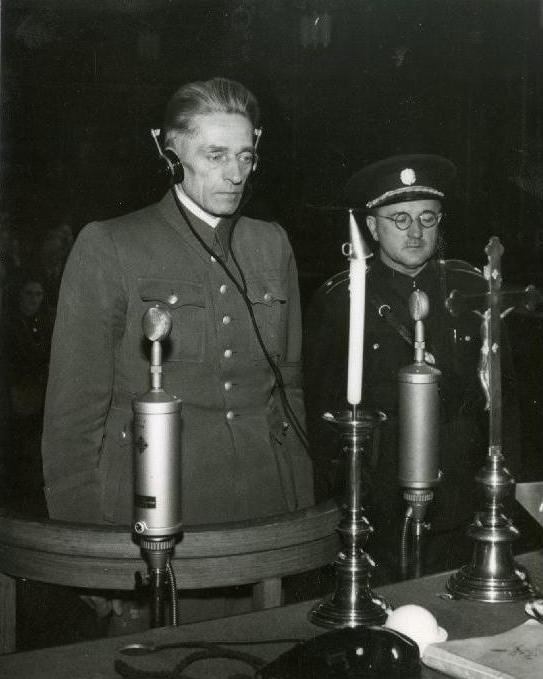
Karl Hermann Frank (left) on trial in Prague, 1946

Bohemia and Moravia were liberated by May 1945 by the Western Allies, who arrived in Pilsen on 5 May, and the Red Army, which captured Prague on 9 May 1945. More than three-quarters of Czechoslovak war deaths were Jews who were murdered in the Holocaust. The total number of Jewish Holocaust victims from the Protectorate was about 80,000, 80 percent of the prewar population. Besides those who emigrated, about 14,000 Jews survived in other ways. A third of Jews who had emigrated returned after the war. In 1946, there were an estimated 23,000 Jews living in the Czech lands, of whom half had lived elsewhere before the war. Emigration to Palestine was not restricted until late 1949, after the 1948 Communist coup. By 1950, only around 14,000 to 18,000 Jews remained in Czechoslovakia.

President Edvard Beneš made it clear that postwar Czechoslovakia was to be a nation of Czechs and Slovaks only. Jews who remained in the country faced pressure to assimilate or leave. Two thousand to three thousand Jews who had identified themselves as Germans on prewar censuses were subjected to the same discrimination as non-Jewish Germans, including deprivation of citizenship, forfeiture of property, and requirement to wear white armbands. Due to discrimination, thousands of Jews applied to leave the country voluntarily. The deportation of Jews as part of the expulsion of Germans was abruptly halted in September 1946 due to media outrage and objections from the military governor of the American occupation zone of Germany. Some Jews were nevertheless deported. Although two thousand Jews counted as Germans were eventually able to regain their Czechoslovak citizenship, most ended up emigrating, primarily to Germany.

Although postwar laws negated property confiscation, most Jews (even those recognized as Czechs) faced severe obstacles in recovering their property. Many Jews were unable to return to their homes, now occupied by non-Jewish Czechs. Being considered German in any way (for example, having attended a German-language school) was a reason not to return a confiscated house to a Jewish survivor. When Jews had left movable property with non-Jewish acquaintances, these were frequently unwilling to return it. Both Communists and some nationalists demanded the nationalization of Jewish property. The majority of confiscated property was not claimed by heirs, and was transferred in 1947 to the Currency Liquidation Fund. In the 1990s, laws enabled survivors and their descendants who were Czech citizens to reclaim properties or their equivalent value. This process excluded most Jews who had emigrated to Israel or the United States. During the years after the war, several Holocaust perpetrators and collaborators were tried and convicted, as part of a purge of collaborators that was one of the most severe in Europe. People who denounced Jews or helped to purge them from associations were punished harshly, unlike those who had financially benefited from property confiscation.

Some Holocaust survivors embraced Communism, hoping to build an entirely new political regime on the basis of equality and social justice. State-sponsored antisemitism was most prominent in the 1950s, manifested especially in the Slánský trial, in which mostly Jewish communists were accused of conspiring on behalf of a worldwide Zionist conspiracy. The trial was accompanied by a nationwide antisemitic campaign; other Jews were prosecuted in politically motivated trials and hundreds of Jews lost their jobs. Many Jewish communists supported the Prague Spring and 6,000 Jews emigrated after the Warsaw Pact invasion of Czechoslovakia to suppress it in 1968. By the 1989 Velvet Revolution, no more than 10,000 Jews lived in Czechoslovakia. As of 2021, about 3,000 people were officially registered with Jewish communities in the Czech Republic, but the Federation of Jewish Communities estimates the number of people with a connection to Judaism at 15,000 to 20,000.

== Legacy ==
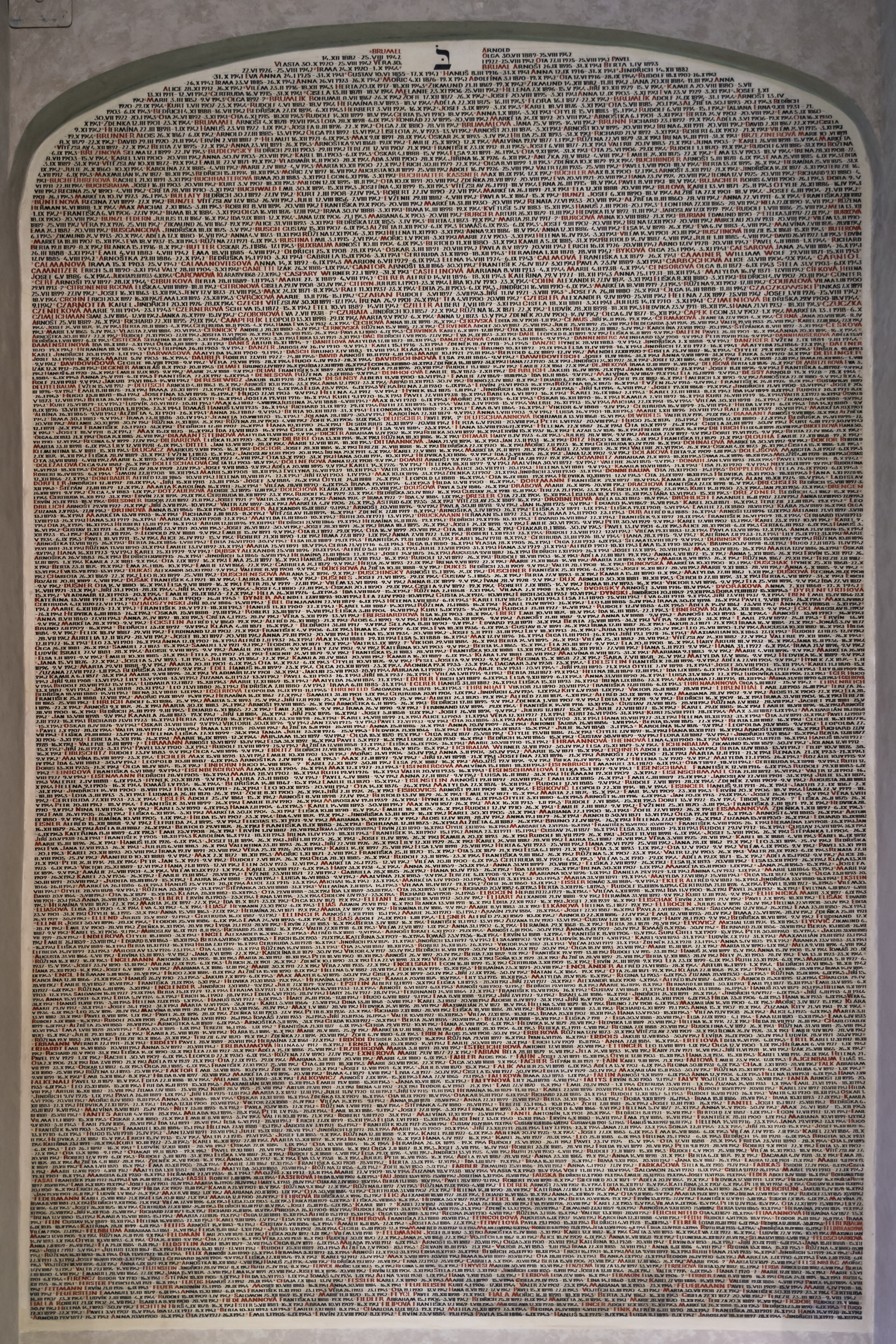
List of victims on the wall of Pinkas Synagogue in Prague, Brumel–Fink

During the Communist rule in Czechoslovakia the Holocaust was mostly ignored in the Communist historical culture. The Lidice massacre became a hegemonic symbol of the German occupation, but the largest massacre of Czechoslovak citizens during the war (on 8–9 March 1944 in Auschwitz) was almost forgotten outside the Jewish community. The tendency to add Jewish victims into the total of Czechoslovak war victims while ignoring the Holocaust was common in Communist historiography, and criticized by opposition group Charter 77. In the 1970s and 1980s, Miroslav Kárný was the first Czech historian to write about the Holocaust in Bohemia and Moravia, primarily on his own initiative as a private citizen.

After the 1989 fall of the Communist regime, scholarly interest in the Holocaust greatly increased, many academic theses relating to the Holocaust being published. This interest peaked around 2000. The Romani genocide triggered heated public debate over the role of the Second Republic and the Protectorate government in setting up concentration camps for Romani and Sinti people at Lety and Hodonin. The expulsion of Germans was also a very controversial issue in historiography and in Czech–German relations. In contrast, the Holocaust has often been perceived as noncontroversial in the Czech Republic. During the late 2010s, some historians began to examine the Holocaust outside of a national framework and research issues such as the role of the Protectorate government and some parts of the Czech population in the persecution of Jews.

The Holocaust also became a subject of Czech popular culture, mostly after 1989. Representation of the Holocaust is greater in soft forms of popular culture (such as literature) than hard forms, such as museums and monuments. The names of 77,297 known victims of the Holocaust from Bohemia and Moravia are written on the walls of Pinkas Synagogue in Prague. Other memorials are located at Terezín and a few other locations. The 1960 film Romeo, Julie a tma was one of the most successful Czechoslovak films abroad and depicts a young man's unsuccessful attempt to hide his Jewish lover. Jiří Weil and Arnošt Lustig, both Holocaust survivors, became known for their literature on the event. In the twenty-first century, an important trend in literature is writers who tie together the Holocaust and the expulsion of Germans, considering both events as part of a ten-year process in which the traditional coexistence of Czechs, Germans, and Jews in the Czech lands was violently destroyed.
