= Stokes interview =

United States immigration aspect

The Stokes interview is a secondary interview conducted on a couple who are trying to obtain an immigration green card in the United States on the basis of their marriage. It occurs when the immigration officer conducting the adjustment of status interview suspects that a couple's marital status is fraudulent. The Stokes interview is offered as a second chance for the couple to prove their marriage's legitimacy. What separates the Stokes interview from the initial adjustment of status interview, which is usually the only interview necessary in the process, is that during the Stokes interview couples are interviewed separately instead of together. The two interviews are recorded and compared for discrepancies. Applicants have a right to have an attorney present throughout both separate interviews. The Stokes interview is also sometimes known as a marriage fraud interview.

== Origin ==
The Stokes interview originated from the Federal District court case of Stokes vs. the INS in 1975. Two U.S. citizens, Charles Cook and Bernard Stokes, who married citizens of Guyana filed a suit challenging the INS procedure for determining whether to grant preferential status on the ground that the two non-citizens were "immediate relative" of U.S. citizens. The couples had been married in civil ceremonies, each man filed a Form I-130 petition for their wives listing them as "immediate relative". The result of this case was that when an immigration officer questions the legitimacy of a couple's marital status they may conduct a secondary interview for investigation. The applicant must be provided a written notice describing the rights of the parties involved. A second attachment of the rights must be provided with the appointment letter, as well as a list of the documents required to be submitted at the time of the interview.

Stokes interviews were originally conducted by the Immigration & Naturalization Service (INS) until it was disbanded in 2003. Its responsibilities were assumed by the United States Citizenship and Immigration Services (USCIS), responsibilities including, Permanent Residence or green cards, the processing of Form I-130s, Adjustment of status and Stokes interviews as well as many others.

== Required documents ==
The documents an applicant must provide at a Stokes interview are as follows:

- Photo identification of the citizen spouse
- Proof of the petitioner's citizenship
- Immigrant spouse's passport
- Marriage certificate
- Employment letters and the last two pay stubs
- Bank account information
- Rent receipts
- Tax returns
- Insurance policies
- Utility bills
- Photo albums

Many other documents may be requested by the immigration officer depending on the particular circumstances of the case.

== Process ==
During a Stokes interview a couple will be interviewed both together and separately. The process often takes several hours to complete. Each member of the couple will be asked many personal and intrusive questions about themselves and their spouse. The spouse will be asked the same questions separately. The two interviews will be recorded and compared for discrepancies. The couple may be allowed a chance to explain discrepancies should they occur. It is recommended that applicants answer the questions as honestly and truthfully as possible. If an applicant does not know the answer to a question or has forgotten, it is recommended that they say "I don't know" or "I don't remember" rather than attempting to make something up.

Very few couples seeking the citizenship or status adjustment of a partner undergo the Stokes interview. Most couples applying for citizenship will only undergo the Adjustment of Status interview after filing their form Form I-130 petition.

== See also ==
- Form I-130
- Adjustment of status
