= Arijský boj =

Fascist Czech newspaper (1940–1945)

Arijský boj (Aryan Struggle)
- "Proti Židům pravdou a činy!" (Against the Jews with truth and deeds)
- Cover of the newspaper, 4 March 1944
- Type: Weekly newspaper
- Format: Tabloid
- Owner: Jan Vladimír Břetenář
- Editor-in-chief: Rudolf Novák
- Founded: May 1940
- Ceased publication: 5 May 1945
- Political alignment: Vlajka
- Language: Czech language
- Headquarters: Protectorate of Bohemia and Moravia
- City: Prague
- Country: Protectorate of Bohemia and Moravia
- Circulation: 16,000
- OCLC number: 767652142

Arijský boj ("Aryan Struggle") was a pro-Nazi Czech-language weekly tabloid newspaper published between May 1940 and May 1945 in the Protectorate of Bohemia and Moravia. Inspired by the Nazi newspaper Der Stürmer, the newspaper made antisemitism its main theme and was also critical of the Czechoslovak government-in-exile. Denunciations published by the newspaper contributed to the isolation of Jews during the first years of the Holocaust in Bohemia and Moravia.

== Background ==
Antisemitism and fascism, as represented in the newspaper, were the fringe of opinion among Czechs, but gained in popularity after the 1938 Munich Agreement forced Czechoslovakia to cede the Sudetenland to Nazi Germany. The paper's antecedent was another newspaper Štít národa (Shield of the Nation), which started to publish soon after the German occupation of the Czech rump state in March 1939, which established the Protectorate of Bohemia and Moravia. Arijský boj began to publish in May 1940, in tabloid format, publishing weekly on Saturdays. Its slogan was "Proti Židům pravdou a činy!" (Against the Jews with truth and deeds). Inspired by Der Stürmer, the newspaper made antisemitism its main theme. In a letter to Emanuel Moravec, editor-in-chief Rudolf Novák stated: "Our paper spreads throughout the Czech countryside an antidote against Benešite whispered propaganda... In a reporting fashion... we expose local Jew-lovers, Benešites, and the like." It was the official organ of the Vlajka Czech fascist movement.

== Contributors ==
Rudolf Novák (1890–1947), who had been imprisoned in Austria-Hungary for his activism in the Czech National Social Party and served in the Czechoslovak Legion, was the editor-in-chief of the newspaper from early 1941. Novák managed to increase the newspaper's circulation to 16,000 by employing a "ruthless, tabloid writing style". Jan Vladimir Břetenář, another ex-legionnaire fascist, was originally the publisher. However, he was arrested by the Gestapo in December 1940 and deported to Dachau concentration camp; ownership passed to his daughter, Olga. Other contributors included Vladimír Krychtálek, Karel Lažnovský, and Emanuel Vajtauer.

== Content ==
The main theme of the newspaper was antisemitism and criticism of "Jew-lovers". It also promoted Nazism and collaboration with the Nazis and criticized both the interwar Czechoslovak government and the Czechoslovak government-in-exile. In practice, this was two sides of the same coin because Arijský boj claimed that the democratic Czechoslovak government had been nothing more than "little Palestine" and had been preceded by "Jew-Habsburg Austria". The government-in-exile was supposedly dominated by Jews, such as Jaroslav Stránský, the minister of justice, whose grandfather had converted to Christianity. Arijský boj attacked celebrities and organizations which it felt were insufficiently enthusiastic about the German occupation, accusing other newspapers of keeping "two irons in the fire". Those with a "Janus head" were threatened with denunciation. Simultaneously, the newspaper promoted fascist and antisemitic associations.

The first page contained criticism of the Czechoslovak government-in-exile, often employing fabricated stories involving fictional mistresses. The article "Alice Masaryk's Harem" accuses the former president Tomáš Garrigue Masaryk's daughter of being a lesbian who kept a harem in Carpathian Ruthenia, while simultaneously having a fetish for Jewish men. The newspaper also published "bizarre antisemitic ramblings"; headlines included "Stalin: 'Slavic' Jew", "Jews – parasites", and "The Jew wanted this war". Blood libel allegations were resuscitated, and antisemitic theories of individuals such as Houston Stewart Chamberlain were profiled. The newspaper also agitated for anti-Jewish measures.

In December 1942, following the Joint Declaration by Members of the United Nations against Nazi Germany's ongoing extermination of European Jews, Arijský boj claimed in an article title that "The Jewish Mischling [half-breed] Masaryk, Jr., threatens from London". In another article two weeks later, the paper recommended continued support for the persecution of Jews despite the threat of prosecution after the war and information from foreign radio that the Jews deported from the Protectorate were being systematically murdered. The antisemitic content and promotion of collaboration did not decrease, even after it became clear that Germany would lose the war. In 1944, several contributors to the magazine, including Novák, published a book titled "Protižidovská čítanka" (Anti-Jewish Reader). In March 1945, Novák claimed that antisemitism was victorious and that "The great significance of 15 March 1939 [German occupation of Czechoslovakia] lies... in the fact that we got rid of the Jews forever!"

== Denunciations ==
The "Floodlight" section on the third page was dedicated to insults and denunciations against specific Jews and non-Jews, usually with addresses and threats. The newspaper solicited denunciations of Jews and non-Jews who failed to follow anti-Jewish regulations or were insufficiently pro-Nazi from its readership, making it easier for Czechs to make denunciations without going directly to Nazi institutions. "Write us, call (our telephone number is 313-75), visit us. Take part actively in the purifying anti-Jewish struggle." In his postwar trial for collaboration, Novák estimated that he had received 60 such letters daily and it was not possible to print them all. The Czech police investigated all of these denunciations and some of the victims of denunciations were arrested by the Gestapo and deported to concentration camps. Not all victims survived the experience. Its role in printing denunciations meant that Arijský boj and similar newspapers played a key role in the isolation of the Jewish population during the first years of the German occupation. People—especially sympathizers of National Partnership—denounced others that they knew, claiming that they aided Jews or continued to associate with them. Denunciations also affected Czechs who were accused of sympathy to Jews, preventing those inclined from offering aid.

Not all denunciations targeted individuals: one anonymous letter alleged: "For its Jewish politics the former state paid the highest price: collapse and destruction... never forget the period of Jewish rule." Most correspondents had specific complaints, such as the fact that the synagogue at Moravské Budějovice, though it had been shuttered, still had Hebrew signage; or that Jews had not yet been banned "from going to the market in the morning". In one complaint against a baker selling bread to a Jew, the writer said, "It's high time for the Czech person to understand that the Jew is his greatest enemy." Some denunciations shed light not just on the willingness of antisemites to report on their neighbors, but also the resistance to Nazi edicts among other Czechs. According to one writer from the town of Čáslav:

That some of our people provocatively overlook the regulations for Jews is evident from the fact that they over-respectfully greet Jews on the street and often stop and have friendly conversation with them. If they continue to repeat such improper conduct then those apprehended will also be marked... as apparent Jew-lovers and humiliated friends of Jews!

== Aftermath ==
The last issue was published 4 May 1945, the day before the Prague uprising. Novák was arrested eleven days later by the Allied authorities. In 1947, he was convicted of collaboration and sentenced to death by hanging. Václav Píš, the regional editor in Čáslav, was also convicted, sentenced to death, and executed in 1947. In his editing, Píš had focused on attacking specific Czech "Jew-lovers" rather than political writing on the Reich or the exile government. Although dozens of people were tried for denunciations to Arijský boj and the similar newspaper Vlajka, denunciations were difficult to prove and typically initiated by Holocaust survivors. However, most Czech Jews did not survive in order to testify; in Novák's trial, most evidence was given by Jews who had been in mixed marriages.

In 2012, former Prime Minister Miloš Zeman claimed that the campaign in the Czech Republic against restitution to churches for communist confiscations resembles Arijský boj.
