= Sham marriage =

False marriage of convenience for gain

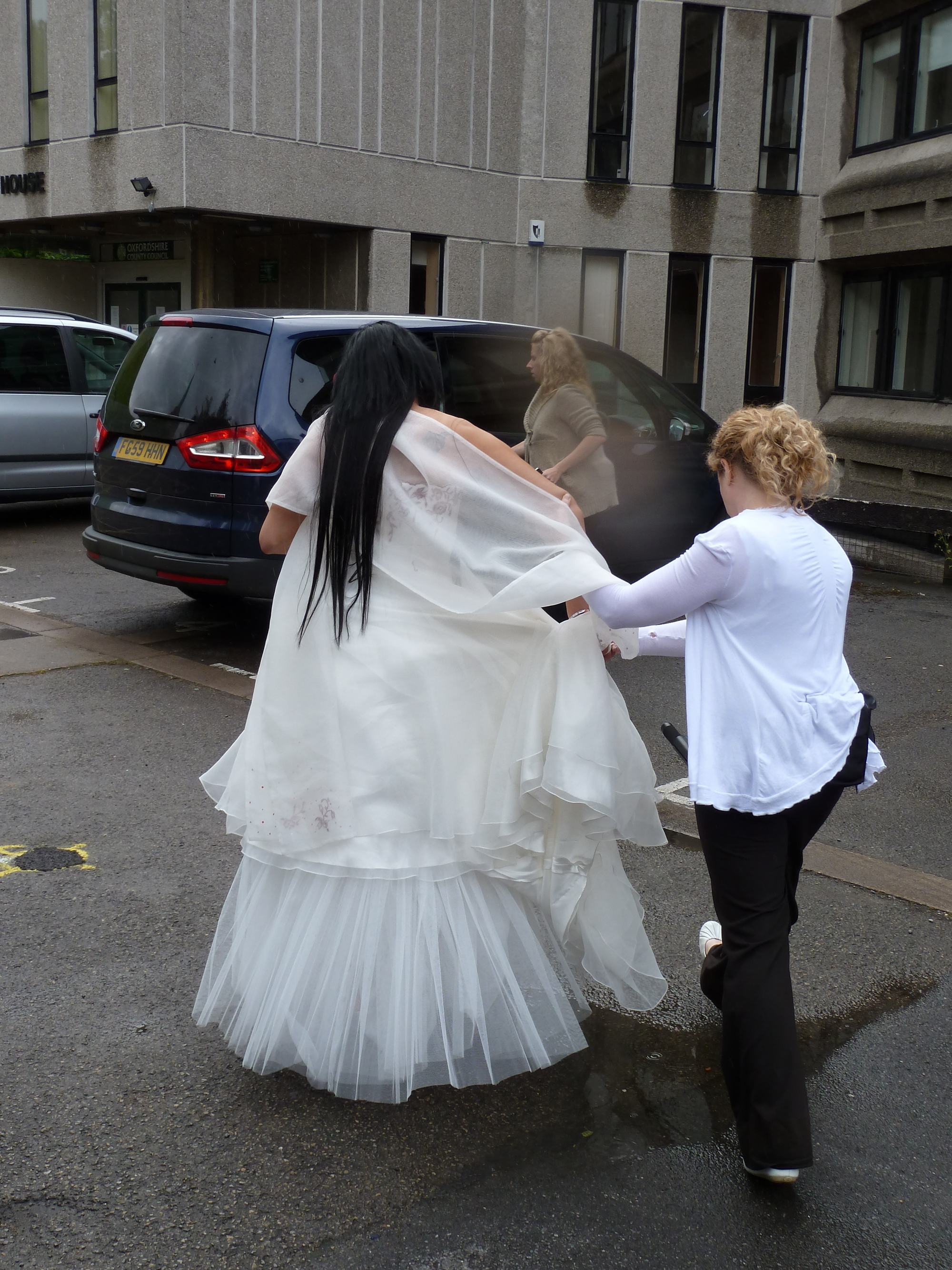
Officers from the UK Border Agency lead away the would-be bride in an operation to prevent a suspected sham marriage.

A sham marriage or fake marriage is a marriage of convenience entered into without intending to create a real marital relationship. This is usually for the purpose of gaining an advantage from the marriage.

Definitions of sham marriage vary by jurisdiction, but are often related to poverty, residence permits or citizenship. The essential point in the varying definitions is whether the couple intend to live in a real marital relationship, to establish a life together. A typical definition by the UK Home Office in 2015:

A sham marriage or civil partnership is one where the relationship is not genuine but one party hopes to gain an immigration advantage from it. There is no subsisting relationship, dependency, or intent to live as husband and wife or civil partners.

While referred to as a "sham" or "fake" because of its motivation, the union itself is legally valid if it conforms to the formal legal requirements for marriage in the jurisdiction. Arranging or entering into such a marriage to deceive public officials is in itself a violation of the law of some countries, for example the US.

After a period, couples often divorce if there is no purpose in remaining married. The reverse situation, in which a couple gets a divorce while continuing to live together, is called paper divorce.

Sham marriages are sometimes considered distinct from a marriage fraud, which is a type of romance scam, in which one spouse is unwittingly taken advantage of by the foreign spouse who feigns romantic interest, typically in order to obtain a residence permit or for money.

== Background ==
Common reasons for sham marriages are to gain immigration, residency, work, or citizenship rights for one of the spouses.

There have been cases of people entering into a sham marriage to avoid suspicion of homosexuality, bisexuality, etc. For example, Hollywood studios had allegedly requested homosexual/homoromantic actors, such as Rock Hudson, to conceal their homosexuality in a so-called lavender marriage.

Sham marriages have also been used to avoid military conscription in the US and Israel.

== Fraud ==
Since the intersection of citizenship-by-marriage laws and affordable international travel in the latter half of the 20th century, sham marriages have become a common method to allow a foreigner to reside, and possibly gain citizenship, in the country of the spouse. The couple marries with knowledge that the marriage is solely for the purpose of obtaining the favorable immigration status, and without intending to live as a couple. This is frequently arranged as a business transaction with payment of a sum of money, and occurs more commonly with foreigners already in the country.

=== United Kingdom ===
In the UK, sham marriage is a form of immigration fraud undertaken to gain legal immigrant status. The fraud is investigated mostly by the UK Border Force and previously by the UK Border Agency.

Suspected sham marriages rose sharply in the UK between 2001 and 2004, from around 700 marriages per year to 3,500. The number fell back under 500 in 2005, when the government began to require foreigners to get permission from the UK Home Secretary before they could get married. Increases in sham marriage were reported in London boroughs such as Wandsworth in 2010.

In April 2011, the Border Agency issued guidance to clergy to help prevent sham marriages intended only to gain the right to reside. English and Welsh clergy had to perform a marriage, according to the law, and were advised not to offer to publish banns for any marriage where one partner was from outside the European Union. Instead, the couple were to be asked to apply for a licence; if a member of the clergy was not satisfied that a marriage was genuine, they had to make that clear to the person responsible for granting the licence.

Since the Home Office hostile environment policy started in 2012, there has been criticism in the UK of heavy-handed action affecting genuine marriages. Genuine weddings have been interrupted, and dawn raids have been made to check whether couples are sharing a bed. People have been detained for months on wrongly being accused of being in a sham marriage.

In 2013, the Home Office estimated that between 4,000 and 10,000 marriages per year were sham marriages entered for the purpose of gaining legal immigration status for the non-EU partner. In 2018, 1,618 marriages reported by registrars as being suspicious were investigated; the Home Office refused to say how many were found to be sham.

=== United States ===
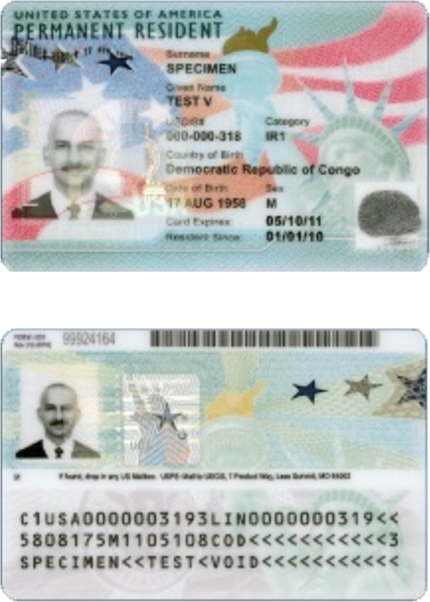
A US green card

A green card marriage is a marriage of convenience between a legal resident of the United States of America and a person who would be ineligible for residency if they were not being married to the resident. The term derives from the availability of permanent resident documents ("green cards") for spouses of legal residents in the United States, where marriage is one of the fastest and surest ways to obtain legal residence. Marriages, if legitimate, entitle the spouse to live and work in the United States, as in most other countries. In the United States, 2.3 million marriage visas were approved from 1998 through 2007, representing 25% of all green cards in 2007. Even if the non-resident spouse was previously an illegal immigrant, marriage entitles the spouse to residency.

Most marriages between residents and non-residents are undertaken properly, for reasons other than or in addition to residency status. That said, the practice of obtaining residency through marriage is illegal in the United States if the marriage itself is fraudulent. A marriage that is solely for purposes of obtaining legal residence is considered a sham, and is a crime in the United States for both participants.

Many of the arrangements are simple transactions between two individuals, often in exchange for money paid to the legal resident. In other cases the legal resident is an unwitting victim of a fraudulent marriage. In yet other cases the marriages are arranged by criminal enterprises, sometimes involving the complicity of corrupt immigration officials who accept payment for describing the marriage as legitimate in immigration paperwork.

=== Switzerland ===
In Switzerland, sham marriages are punished with a monetary punishment or prison if crucial information is intentionally withheld from immigration authorities, or if somebody is married to circumvent immigration laws. Before 2005, being involved in a sham marriage was not punished, but the marriage was dissolved anyway if it manifested an abuse of rights – with the usual consequence that the foreigner lost his permit and had to leave the country. Marriages for any other purpose than circumventing immigration laws (e.g. avoiding inheritance taxes) are legal.

=== India ===
Matrimonial fraud is heavily increasing in India. Some women have been convicted of honey-trapping men into marriages, and later filing fraudulent complaints, with the goal of taking money.

== Legislation and investigation ==
In United States immigration law, marriage not made in good faith and for purposes of immigration fraud is a felony, subject to a penalty of a US$250,000 fine and five-year prison sentence on the citizen, and deportation of the foreigner. In the 2009 fiscal year, 506 of the 241,154 petitions filed were denied for suspected fraud, a rate of only 0.2%. U.S. Citizenship and Immigration Services typically conducts an interview of marriage-based green card applicants, with additional scrutiny if they are from a developing country, have a different ethnicity or religion from their sponsor, have a large age gap with their sponsor, or have a history of prior marriage-based green card applications.

In Canada, legislation on sham marriages was strengthened in 2012. Continuous controversy arose regarding the issue; Canadian officials have been accused both of being too harsh and harassing couples and of being too lenient in deciding what is a genuine relationship. In addition, there have been objections to the policy from women's organizations, which argued that the new policy which requires the sponsor and the new spouse to live in a "genuine relationship" for two years endangers women who are victims of domestic violence. Although there is an exception to this rule in cases of abuse, the policy has been accused of being too weak (as abuse is difficult to prove).

== See also ==
- Arranged marriage
- Beard (companion)
- Bogus colleges in the United Kingdom
- Green Card (film)—in which a sham marriage is the main plot
- Heqin
- Hollywood marriage—including marriages entered into and promoted primarily for their publicity value
- Legal consequences of marriage and civil partnership in England and Wales
- Mail-order bride—often involving brides wishing to get immigration access to a mate's country
- Mariage blanc—a marriage without consummation
- Marriage of convenience—of which "sham" marriages are a subgroup
- Marriage in the United Kingdom
- National Border Targeting Centre
- The Proposal (film)—a romantic comedy set around what is initially a fake marriage
- U.S. Diplomatic Security Service (DSS) § Passport and visa fraud
- Void marriage—an attempted marriage which does not even meet the legal requirements for a marriage
- In episode 10 "A Legal Matter" of season 6 of That '70s Show, Fez carelessly reveals that his marriage is a sham to an immigration officer, as well as in episode 16 "My Fairy King" of season 8, Hyde finds out that Samantha lead him on in a fake marriage.
- Jus soli – Birthright of anyone born in the territory of a state to nationality or citizenship
