= Aktion Gitter (1939) =

Aktion Gitter (Czech: Akce Mříže) was the March 1939 arrest of thousands of anti-Nazi activists by the Gestapo in the Protectorate of Bohemia and Moravia based on lists that had been drawn up before the occupation by the Czechoslovak police.

== Sources ==
- Stolina, Radim. "Počátek okupace v Táboře" (in Czech). Husitské muzeum v Táboře.
- Adamec, Václav (2016). "Akce referátu II A brněnské řídící úřadovny Gestapa proti levicovému odboji na Moravě v letech 1939–1943". Securitas Imperii (in Czech) (28): 60–95. ISSN 1804-1612.
- Wünschmann, Kim (2015). Before Auschwitz. Harvard University Press. pp. 215–. ISBN 978-0-674-96759-5.
- "Březen 1939: Akce Mříže. První vlna zatýkání odpůrců nacismu". Plus (in Czech). 19 March 2019.
- Demetz, Peter (2009). Prague in Danger: The Years of German Occupation, 1939-45: Memories and History, Terror and Resistance, Theater and Jazz, Film and Poetry, Politics and War. Farrar, Straus and Giroux. ISBN 978-1-4299-3035-2.
