= Paper divorce =

Case in which a couple obtains a legal divorce but continues to live together

A paper divorce is a case in which a couple obtains a legal divorce but continues to live together as before. It may be done for financial reasons, such as to isolate medical debts to only fall on the ill partner. If the divorce is fraudulent, it is called a sham divorce.
