= Karel Pavlík =

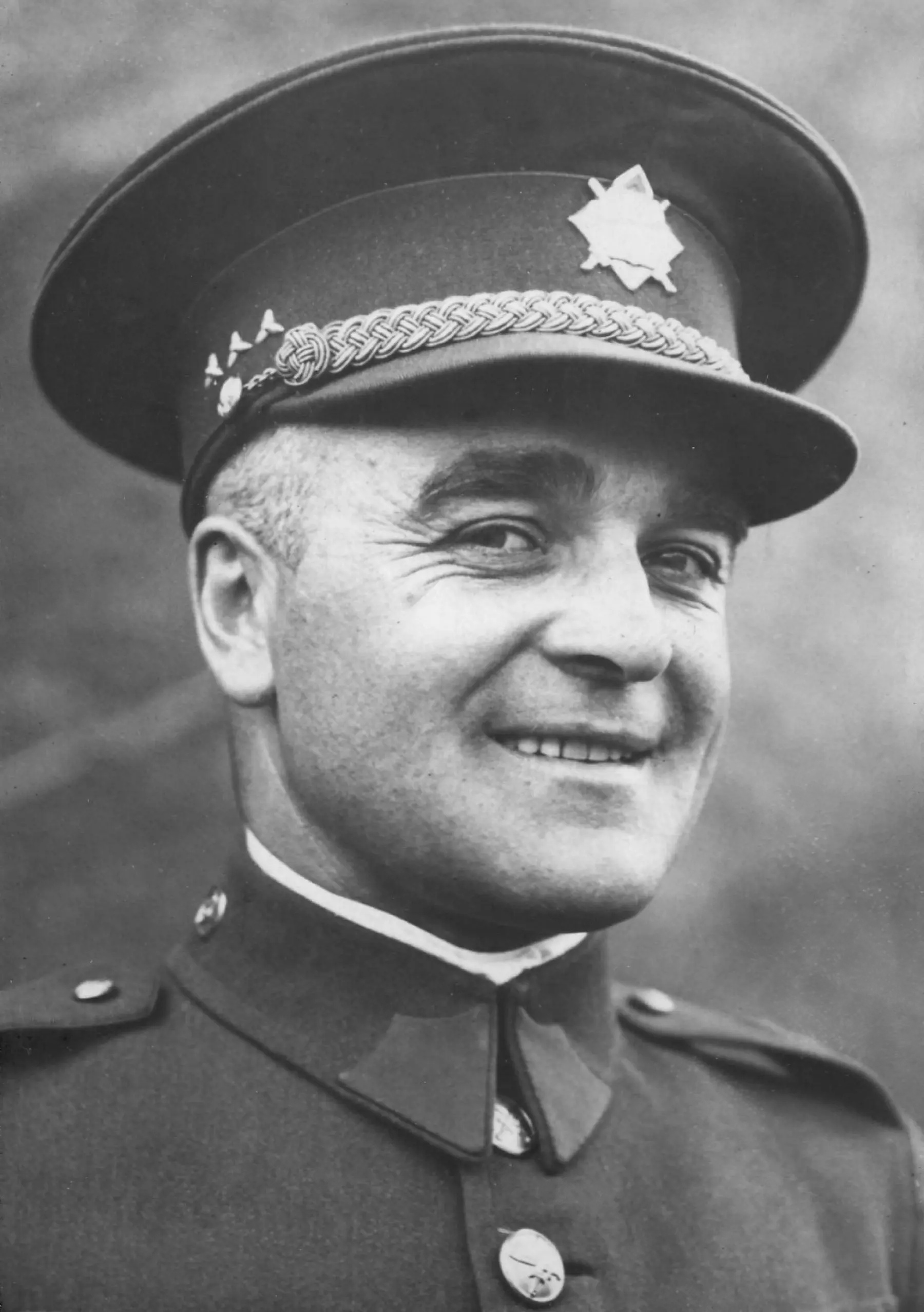
Karel Pavlík

Karel Pavlík (19 October 1900 in Hradové Střímelice – 26 January in 1943 Mauthausen) was a Czechoslovak Army captain (posthumously promoted to colonel) and decorated hero of Czechoslovakia.

Captain Pavlík was a commander of a company that resisted the German occupation. On 14 March 1939 when German troops invaded Czechoslovakia, Pavlík was the Officer Commanding of the 12th machine-gun company of the 8th Infantry Regiment housed in Czajánek's barracks in the town of Místek.

After the battle, Pavlík was forced to surrender, and soon the rest of Czechoslovakia fell peacefully to the Germans. Pavlík joined a resistance group called Za Vlast ("For the country"), which helped Czechoslovak pilots flee to Allied nations. Then he moved to Prague where he joined another resistance group, Obrana národa, and cooperated with Václav Morávek. After the betrayal of Ladislav Vaněk in the group Jindra, Pavlík was captured by the Gestapo and imprisoned at Mauthausen. After torture and questioning he was shot. His body was never found and his symbolic grave is in Kostelec nad Černými lesy.

== Honours ==
- Medal of Heroism (1999)
