= Occupation of Czechoslovakia (1938–1945) =

Period of Czechoslovak history

Protectorate of Bohemia and Moravia German occupation of Czechoslovakia
- German military occupation
- 1938/1939–1945
- Flag Coat of arms

- Capital: Prague
- Government
  - Type: Military administration Puppet government
- Historical era: Second World War
  - Established: 30 September/16 March 1938/1939
  - Disestablished: 11 May 1945
Preceded by	Succeeded by
Second Czechoslovak Republic	Third Czechoslovak Republic

The military occupation of Czechoslovakia by Nazi Germany began with the German annexation of the Sudetenland in 1938, followed by the invasion of Prague and the remainder in March 1939, along with the creation of a puppet state in Slovakia. Czechoslovakia maintained a government in exile in London throughout the war, and was liberated in 1945.

Following the Anschluss of Austria in March 1938 and the Munich Agreement in September of that same year, Adolf Hitler annexed the Sudetenland from Czechoslovakia on 1 October, giving Germany control of the extensive Czechoslovak border fortifications in this area. The incorporation of the Sudetenland into Germany left the rest of Czechia ("Rest-Tschechei" (Note: ""Tschechei" is a German linguistic clipping of Tschechoslovakei)) with a largely indefensible northwestern border. Also a Polish-majority borderland region of Trans-Olza which was annexed by Czechoslovakia in 1919, was occupied and annexed by Poland following the two-decade long territorial dispute. Finally the First Vienna Award gave to Hungary the southern territories of Slovakia and Carpathian Ruthenia, mostly inhabited by Hungarians.

On 14 March 1939, the Slovak parliament voted unanimously to establish an independent Slovak state and German troops preemptively marched into Ostrava to prevent the Poles from occupying the region. The following day, during a visit to Berlin, the Czechoslovak president Emil Hácha was coerced into signing away his country's independence as Hungary annexed the remainder of Carpathian Ruthenia. On 16 March, Hitler proclaimed the Protectorate of Bohemia and Moravia from Prague Castle, leaving Hácha as the nominal, but almost powerless, State President. Czechoslovakia was occupied by the Wehrmacht, and real power was vested in Hitler's personal representative, the Reichsprotektor.

During the occupation, between 294,000 to 320,000 citizens were murdered, the majority of them Jews. Reprisal killings were especially harsh after the assassination of Reinhard Heydrich, including the infamous Lidice massacre. Large numbers were drafted for slave labour in Germany.

In March 1944 Germany extended the occupation of Czechoslovakia to Hungary in Operation Margarethe, then to Slovakia in August 1944 following the Slovak National Uprising. The occupation ended with the surrender of Germany at the end of World War II.

== The economic crisis in Germany ==
Hitler's interest in Czechoslovakia was largely economic. Germany had the second-largest economy in the world, but German agriculture was not capable of feeding the population, and there was also a lack of many raw materials, which had to be imported. The Four-Year Plan that Hitler had launched in September 1936 to have the German economy ready for a "total war" by 1940 had seriously strained the German economy by 1937 as German government was forced to use up its foreign exchange reserves both to feed its own people and to import various raw materials to achieve the ambitious armament goals of the Four Year Plan. Though the Four Year Plan aimed at autarky, there were certain raw materials such as high-grade iron, oil, chrome, nickel, tungsten, and bauxite that Germany did not have and had to be imported. The need to import food and raw materials made Germany into Europe's second largest importer, being exceeded only by Great Britain. Moreover, hundreds of millions of Reichsmarks were spent on immense armament works such as the Reichswerke steel complex, an expensive program to develop synthetic fuel, as well as various costly chemical and metallurgical programs, all of which strained the German economy. The Great Depression was an era beset by trade wars and protectionism, which put further straining on the German export market and ability to generate foreign exchange. Moreover, the Four Year Plan with its aim of autarky led to Germany increasing its tariffs, which led other nations to do likewise in retaliation. The British historian Richard Overy wrote the huge demands of the Four Year Plan "...could not be fully met by a policy of import substitution and industrial rationalisation", thus leading Hitler to decide in November 1937 that to stay ahead in the arms race with the other powers that Germany had to seize Czechoslovakia in the near-future.

At the Hossbach conference on 5 November 1937, Hitler announced that seizing Czechoslovakia would increase the supply of food under German control, which in turn would lessen the need to import food, thereby freeing up more foreign exchange to import raw materials necessary for the Four Year Plan's targets. The Hossbach conference was largely taken up with an extended discussion about the necessity of bringing areas adjunct to Germany under German economic control, by force if necessary, as Hitler argued that this was the best way to win the arms race. Hitler stated: "areas producing raw materials can be more usefully sought in Europe, in immediate proximity to the Reich". Overy wrote about Hitler's attitude to the Reich's economic problems that: "He simply saw war instrumentally, as the Japanese had done in Manchuria, as a way to expand the German resource base and to secure it against other powers".

At the time, Czechoslovakia had Europe's 7th largest economy, and easily the most modern, developed, and industrialized economy in Eastern Europe. The former Austrian provinces of Bohemia, Moravia and Silesia that now comprise the modern Czech Republic had been the industrial heartland of the Austrian empire, where the majority of the arms for the Imperial Austrian Army were manufactured, most notably at the Škoda Works. One consequence of this legacy was that Czechoslovakia was the only nation in Eastern Europe besides the Soviet Union that manufactured its own weapons instead of importing them, and Czechoslovakia was the world's 7th largest manufacturer of arms, making Czechoslovakia an important player in the global arms trade.

== Demands for Sudeten autonomy ==
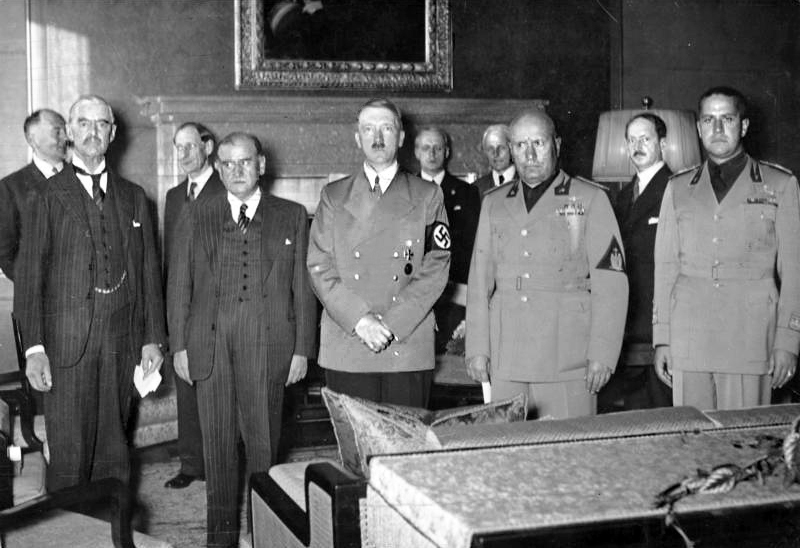
From left to right: Chamberlain, Daladier, Hitler, Mussolini, and Ciano pictured before signing the Munich Agreement, which gave the Sudetenland to Germany

Sudeten German pro-Nazi leader Konrad Henlein offered the Sudeten German Party (SdP) as the agent for Hitler's campaign. Henlein met with Hitler in Berlin on 28 March 1938, where he was instructed to raise demands unacceptable to the Czechoslovak government led by president Edvard Beneš. On 24 April, the SdP issued the Karlsbader Programm, demanding autonomy for the Sudetenland and the freedom to profess National Socialist ideology. If Henlein's demands were granted, the Sudetenland would be an autonomous state aligned with Nazi Germany.

I am asking neither that Germany be allowed to oppress three and a half million Frenchmen, nor am I asking that three and a half million Englishmen be placed at our mercy. Rather I am simply demanding that the oppression of three and a half million Germans in Czechoslovakia cease and that the inalienable right to self-determination takes its place.

— Adolf Hitler's speech at the NSDAP Congress 1938

== Munich Agreement ==
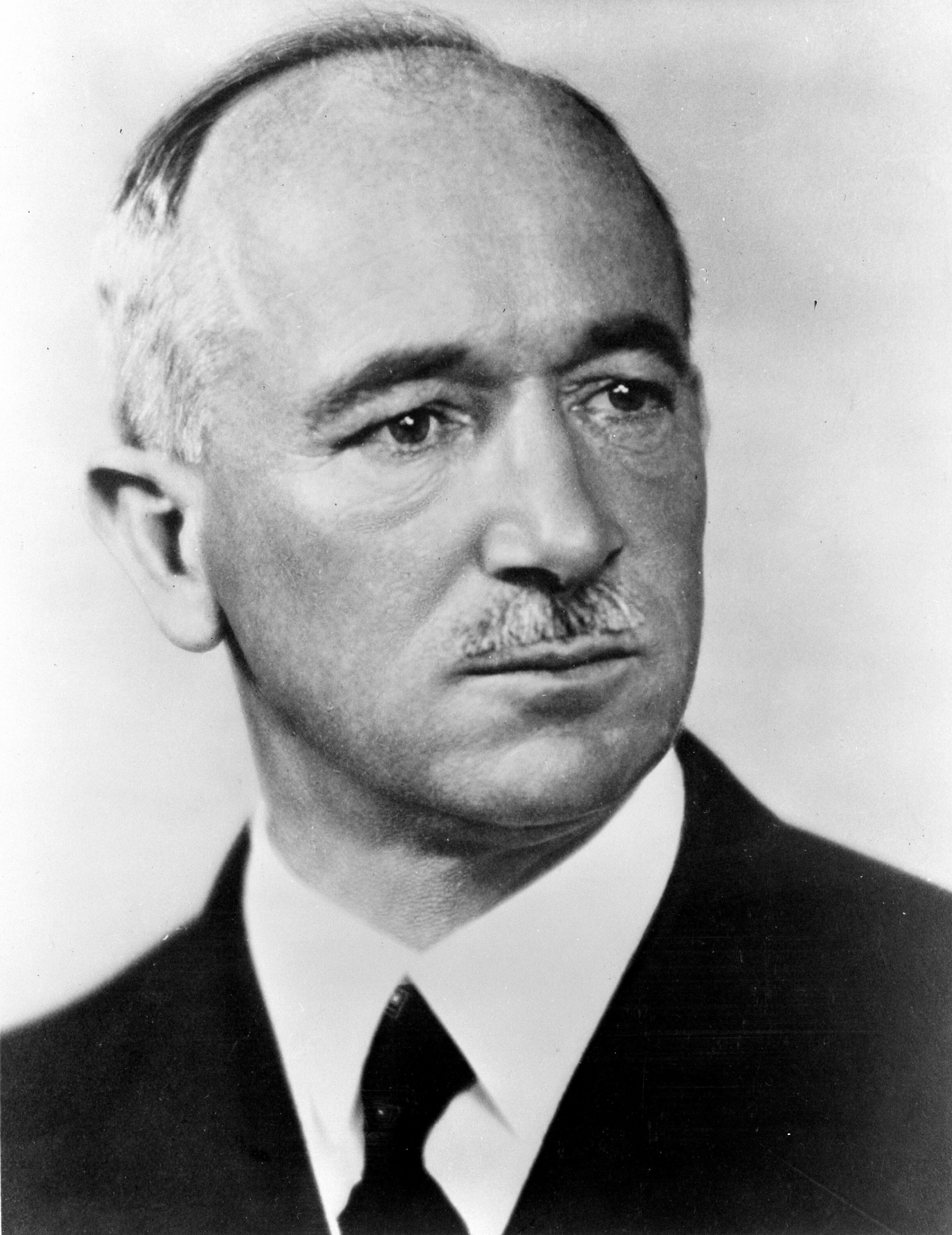
Edvard Beneš, the second President of Czechoslovakia and leader of the Czechoslovak government-in-exile

As the tepid reaction to the German Anschluss with Austria had shown, the governments of France, the United Kingdom and Czechoslovakia were set on avoiding war at any cost. The French government did not wish to face Germany alone and took its lead from the British government, led by Prime Minister Neville Chamberlain. He contended that Sudeten German grievances were justified and believed that Hitler's intentions were limited. That made Britain and France advise Czechoslovakia to concede to the German demands. Beneš resisted, and on 20 May 1938, a partial mobilisation was under way in response to the possible German invasion. It is suggested that the mobilisation could have been launched on basis of Soviet misinformation about Germany being on verge of invasion, which aimed to trigger war in Western Europe.

On 30 May, Hitler signed a secret directive for war against Czechoslovakia to begin no later than 1 October.

In the meantime, the British government demanded for Beneš to request a mediator. Not wishing to sever his government's ties with Western Europe, Beneš reluctantly accepted. The British appointed Lord Runciman and instructed him to persuade Beneš to agree to a plan acceptable to the Sudeten Germans. On 2 September, Beneš submitted the Fourth Plan, which granted nearly all of the demands of the Karlsbader Programm. Intent on obstructing conciliation, however, the SdP held demonstrations that provoked the police in Ostrava on 7 September. The Sudeten Germans broke off negotiations on 13 September, and violence and disruption ensued. As Czechoslovak troops attempted to restore order, Henlein flew to Germany, and on 15 September, he issued a proclamation demanding the takeover of the Sudetenland by Germany.

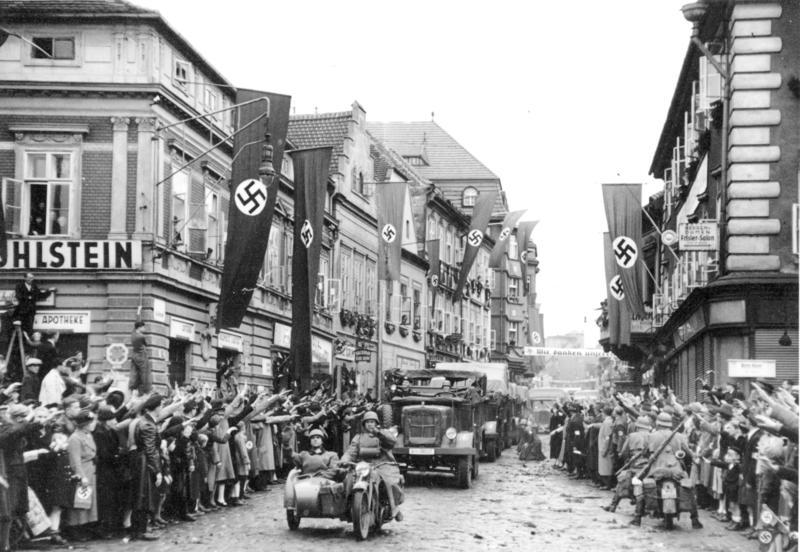
Ethnic Germans in Saaz, Sudetenland, greet German soldiers with the Nazi salute, 1938.

The same day, Hitler met with Chamberlain and demanded the swift takeover of the Sudetenland by Nazi Germany under threat of war. Czechoslovakia, Hitler claimed, was slaughtering the Sudeten Germans. Chamberlain referred the demand to the British and French governments, both of which accepted. The Czechoslovak government resisted by arguing that Hitler's proposal would ruin the nation's economy and ultimately lead to German control of all of Czechoslovakia. The United Kingdom and France issued an ultimatum and made a French commitment to Czechoslovakia contingent upon its acceptance. On 21 September, Czechoslovakia capitulated. The next day, however, Hitler added new demands that insisted for the claims of Poland and Hungary to be satisfied as well. Romania was also invited to share in the division of Carpathian Ruthenia but refused because it was an ally of Czechoslovakia (see Little Entente).

The Czechoslovak capitulation precipitated an outburst of national indignation. In demonstrations and rallies, Czechs and Slovaks called for a strong military government to defend the integrity of the state. A new cabinet, under General Jan Syrový, was installed, and on 23 September 1938, a decree of general mobilization was issued. The Czechoslovak Army was modern, had an excellent system of frontier fortifications and was prepared to fight. The Soviet Union announced its willingness to come to Czechoslovakia's assistance. Beneš, however, refused to go to war without the support of the Western powers.

How horrible, fantastic, incredible it is that we should be digging trenches and trying on gas masks here because of a quarrel in a far-away country between people of whom we know nothing.

— Neville Chamberlain, 27 September 1938, 8 p.m. radio broadcast

Hitler gave a speech in Berlin on 26 September 1938 and declared that the Sudetenland was "the last territorial demand I have to make in Europe". He also stated that he had told Chamberlain, "I have assured him further that, and this I repeat here before you, once this issue has been resolved, there will no longer be any further territorial problems for Germany in Europe!"

On 28 September, Chamberlain appealed to Hitler for a conference. Hitler met the next day at Munich with the chiefs of governments of France, Italy and Britain. The Czechoslovak government was neither invited nor consulted. On 29 September, the Munich Agreement was signed by Germany, Italy, France and Britain. The Czechoslovak government capitulated on 30 September, despite the army's opposition, and agreed to abide by the agreement, which stipulated that Czechoslovakia must cede Sudetenland to Germany. The German occupation of the Sudetenland would be completed by 10 October. An international commission representing Germany, Britain, France, Italy and Czechoslovakia would supervise a plebiscite to determine the final frontier. Britain and France promised to join in an international guarantee of the new frontiers against unprovoked aggression. Germany and Italy, however, would not join in the guarantee until the Polish and Hungarian minority problems were settled.

On 5 October 1938, Beneš resigned as president since he realised that the fall of Czechoslovakia was a fait accompli. After the outbreak of World War II, he would form a Czechoslovak government-in-exile in London.

== First Vienna Award ==
The partition of Czechoslovakia. First Vienna Award in red.

In early November 1938, under the First Vienna Award, which was a result of the Munich agreement, Czechoslovakia—which had failed to reach a compromise with Hungary and Poland—had to cede after the arbitration of Germany and Italy awarded southern Slovakia and Carpathian Ruthenia to Hungary, while Poland invaded Trans-Olza territory shortly after.

As a result, Bohemia, Moravia and Silesia lost about 38% of their combined area to Germany, with some 3.2 million German and 750,000 Czech inhabitants. Hungary, in turn, received 11,882 km^{2} (4,588 sq mi) in southern Slovakia and southern Carpathian Ruthenia; according to a 1941 census, about 86.5% of the population in this territory was Hungarian. Meanwhile, Poland annexed the town of Český Těšín with the surrounding area (some 906 km^{2} (350 sq mi)), some 250,000 inhabitants, Poles making up about 36% of population, and two minor border areas in northern Slovakia, more precisely in the regions Spiš and Orava. (226 km^{2} (87 sq mi), 4,280 inhabitants, only 0.3% Poles).

Soon after Munich, 115,000 Czechs and 30,000 Germans fled to the remaining rump of Czechoslovakia. According to the Institute for Refugee Assistance, the actual count of refugees on 1 March 1939 stood at almost 150,000.

On 4 December 1938, there were elections in Reichsgau Sudetenland, in which 97.32% of the adult population voted for the National Socialist Party. About 500,000 Sudeten Germans joined the National Socialist Party, which was 17.34% of the German population in Sudetenland (the average National Socialist Party participation in Nazi Germany was 7.85%). This means the Sudetenland was the most pro-Nazi region in Nazi Germany. Because of their knowledge of the Czech language, many Sudeten Germans were employed in the administration of the Protectorate of Bohemia and Moravia and in Nazi organizations such as the Gestapo. The most notable was Karl Hermann Frank, the SS and police general and Secretary of State in the Protectorate.

== History ==
=== Second Republic (October 1938 to March 1939) ===
The greatly weakened Czechoslovak Republic was forced to grant major concessions to the non-Czechs. The executive committee of the Slovak People's Party met at Žilina on 5 October 1938, and with the acquiescence of all Slovak parties except the Social Democrats formed an autonomous Slovak government under Jozef Tiso. Similarly, the two major factions in Subcarpathian Ruthenia, the Russophiles and Ukrainophiles, agreed on the establishment of an autonomous government, which was constituted on 8 October. Reflecting the spread of modern Ukrainian national consciousness, the pro-Ukrainian faction, led by Avhustyn Voloshyn, gained control of the local government and Subcarpathian Ruthenia was renamed Carpatho-Ukraine. In 1939, during the occupation, the Nazis banned Russian ballet.

A last-ditch attempt to save Czechoslovakia from total ruin was made by the British and French governments, who on 27 January 1939, concluded an agreement of financial assistance with the Czechoslovak government. In this agreement, the British and French governments undertook to lend the Czechoslovak government £8 million and make a gift of £4 million. Part of the funds were allocated to help resettle Czechs and Slovaks who had fled from territories lost to Germany, Hungary, and Poland in the Munich Agreement or the Vienna Arbitration Award.

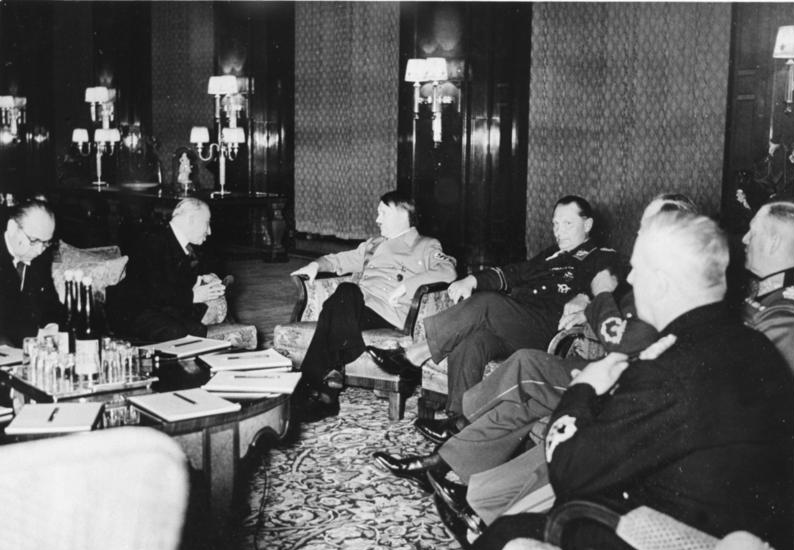
Hácha, Hitler and Göring meeting in Berlin, 14/15 March 1939

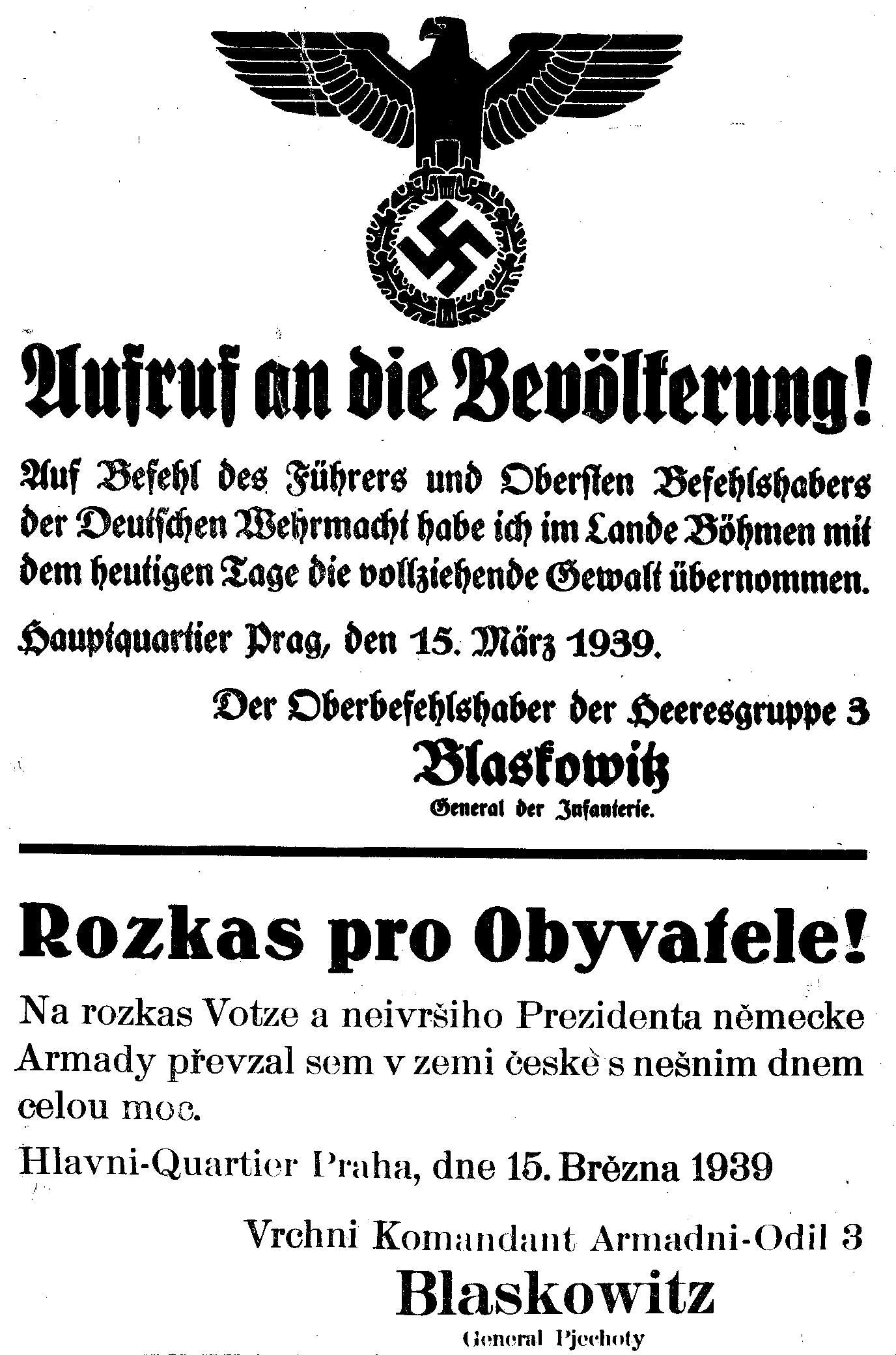
First German poster in Prague, 15 March 1939. English translation: "Notice to the population. By order of the Führer and Supreme Commander of the German Wehrmacht. I have taken over, as of today, the executive power in the Province of Bohemia. Headquarters, Prague, 15 March 1939. Commander, 3rd Army, Blaskowitz, General of infantry." The Czech translation includes numerous grammatical errors.

In November 1938, Emil Hácha, who succeeded Beneš, was elected president of the federated Second Republic, renamed Czecho-Slovakia and consisting of three parts: Bohemia and Moravia, Slovakia, and Carpatho-Ukraine. Lacking its natural frontier and having lost its costly system of border fortification, the new state was militarily indefensible. Without the natural defensive barrier of the mountains of the Sudetenland, Hácha carried out a foreign policy that was slavishly pro-German as he felt this was the best way to preserve his nation's independence.

In late 1938 – early 1939, the continuing economic crisis caused by problems of rearmament, especially the shortage of foreign hard currencies needed to pay for raw materials Germany lacked, together with reports from Hermann Göring that the Four Year Plan was hopelessly behind schedule forced Hitler in January 1939 to reluctantly order major defense cuts. The Wehrmacht had its steel allocations cut by 30%, aluminum by 47%, cement by 25%, rubber by 14%, and copper by 20%. On 30 January 1939, Hitler made his "Export or die!" speech calling for a German economic offensive or "export battle" to use Hitler's term to increase German foreign exchange holdings to pay for raw materials for the Four Year Plan without cutting back on food imports. Hitler's wish to occupy Czechoslovakia was primarily caused by the foreign exchange crisis as Germany had run down its foreign exchange reserves by early 1939, and Germany urgently needed to seize the gold of the Czechoslovak central bank to continue the Four Year Plan. In addition, this allowed Germany to gain control of Czech armament (particularly, the Škoda Works), and get rid of the threat of the Czech army and airfields, which were easily in range of Germany. On 8 March 1939, Hitler met with Wilhelm Keppler, the NSDAP's economic expert, where he spoke about his wish to occupy Czecho-Slovakia for economic reasons, saying that Germany needed its raw materials and industries.

Hitler totally ignored the agreements of the Munich Agreement and scheduled a German invasion of Bohemia and Moravia for the morning of 15 March. In the interim, he negotiated with the Slovak People's Party and with Hungary to prepare the dismemberment of the republic before the invasion. On 13 March, he invited Tiso to Berlin and on 14 March, the Slovak Diet convened and unanimously declared Slovak independence. Carpatho-Ukraine also declared independence but Hungarian troops occupied and annexed it on 15 March and a small part of eastern Slovakia as well on 23 March.

==== 14 March ====
Following the secession of Slovakia and Ruthenia, British Ambassador to Czechoslovakia Basil Newton advised President Hácha to meet with Hitler. When Hácha arrived in Berlin on 14 March, he met with the German Foreign Minister, Joachim von Ribbentrop prior to meeting with Hitler. Von Ribbentrop testified at the Nuremberg trials that during this meeting, Hácha had told him that "he wanted to place the fate of the Czech State in the Führer's hands." Hácha later met with Hitler, where Hitler gave the Czech President two options: cooperate with Germany, in which case the "entry of German troops would take place in a tolerable manner" and "permit Czechoslovakia a generous life of her own, autonomy and a degree of national freedom..." or face a scenario in which "resistance would be broken by force of arms, using all means." Minutes of the conversation noted that for Hácha this was the most difficult decision of his life but believed that in only a few years this decision would be comprehensible and in 50 years would probably be regarded as a blessing. After the negotiations had finished, Hitler told his secretaries, "It is the greatest triumph of my life! I shall enter history as the greatest German of them all."

According to Joachim Fest, Hácha suffered a heart attack induced by Hermann Göring's threat to bomb the capital and by four o'clock he contacted Prague, effectively "signing Czechoslovakia away" to Germany. Göring acknowledged making the threat to the British ambassador to Germany, Nevile Henderson, but said that the threat came as a warning because the Czech government, after already agreeing to German occupation, could not guarantee that the Czech army would not fire on the advancing Germans. Göring, however, does not mention that Hácha had a heart attack because of his threat. French Ambassador Robert Coulondre reported that according to an unnamed, considered a reliable source by Coulondre, by half past four, Hácha was "in a state of total collapse, and kept going only by means of injections."

==== 15–16 March ====
On the morning of 15 March, German troops entered the remaining Czech parts of Czechoslovakia (referenced as "Rest-Tschechei" by Nazi Germany), meeting practically no resistance (the only instance of organized resistance took place in Místek where an infantry company commanded by Karel Pavlík fought invading German troops). The Hungarian invasion of Carpatho-Ukraine encountered resistance but the Hungarian army quickly crushed it. On 16 March, Hitler went to the Czech lands and from Prague Castle proclaimed the German protectorate of Bohemia and Moravia. The British historian Victor Rothwell wrote that the Czechoslovak reserves of gold and hard currency seized in March 1939 were "invaluable in staving off Germany's foreign exchange crisis". In addition, the Germans seized all of the factories for making weapons, mines that provided crucial raw materials for the armament program of the Four Year Plan and a "huge weapons haul, including nearly 500 tanks and nearly 1600 aircraft".

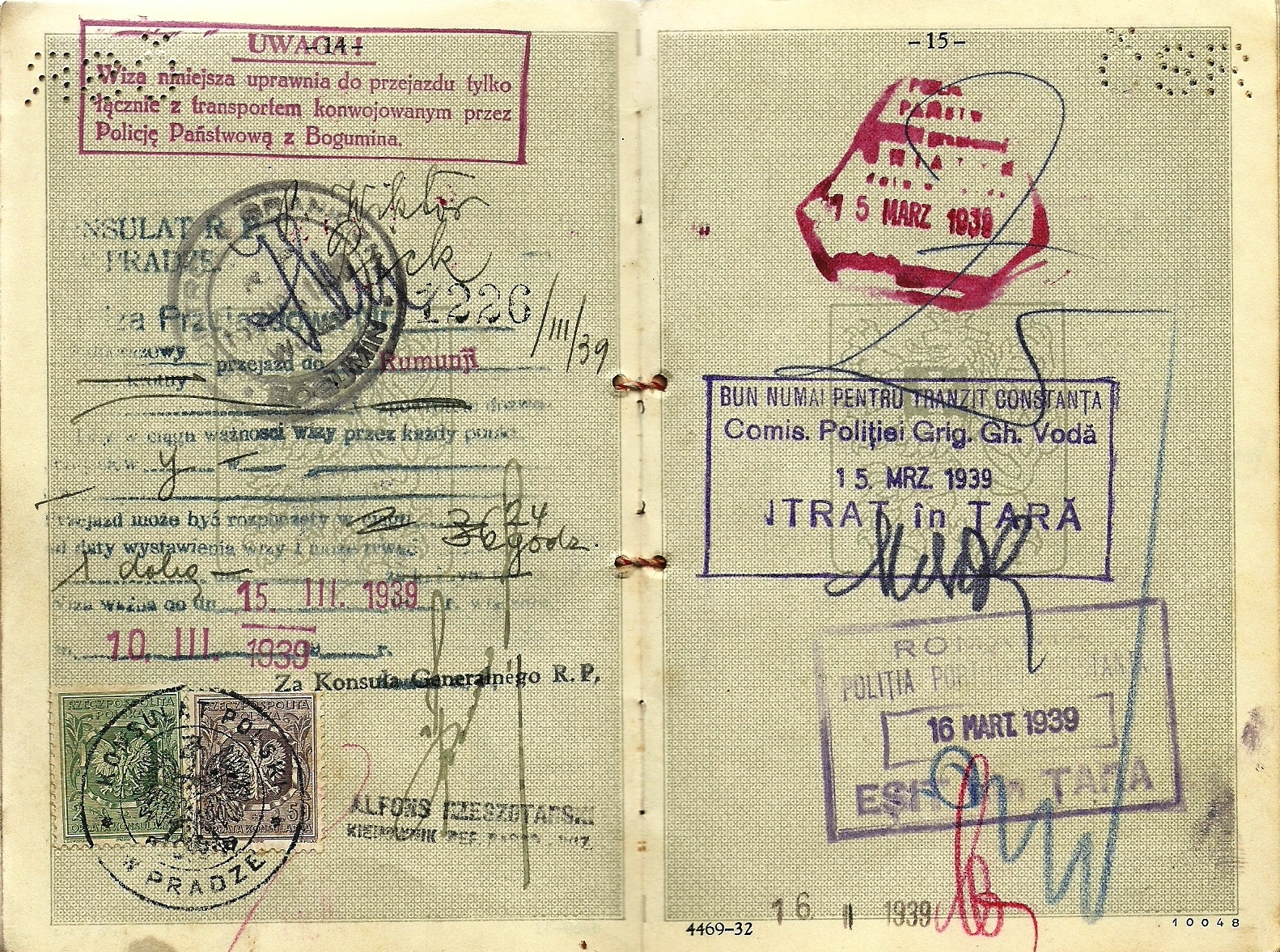
Viktor Pick's 1939 visa used to escape Prague on the last train out on 15 March. Later, he arrived safely in British Palestine.

Besides violating his promises at Munich, the annexation of the rest of Czechoslovakia was, unlike Hitler's previous actions, not described in Mein Kampf. After having repeatedly stated that he was interested only in pan-Germanism, the unification of ethnic Germans into one Reich, Germany had now conquered seven million Czechs. Hitler's proclamation creating the protectorate on 16 March claimed that "Bohemia and Moravia have for thousands of years belonged to the Lebensraum of the German people". British public opinion changed drastically after the invasion. Chamberlain realised that the Munich Agreement had meant nothing to Hitler. Chamberlain told the British public on 17 March during a speech in Birmingham that Hitler was attempting "to dominate the world by force".

=== Second World War ===
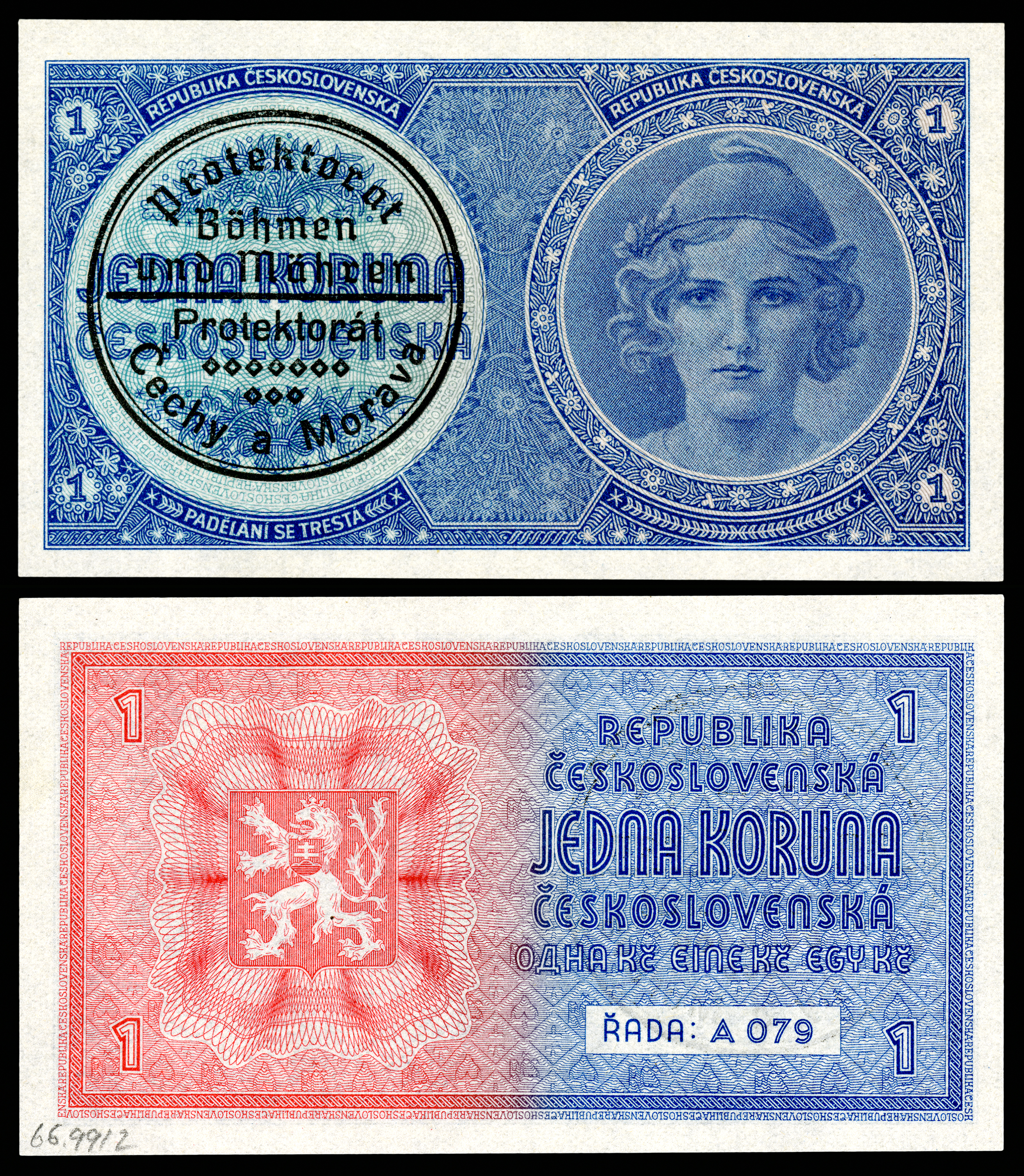
First issue of a Protectorate of Bohemia and Moravia 1 koruna note (1939). An unissued series of 1938 Republic of Czechoslovakia notes were marked with an identifying oval stamp on the front left side until regular issue could be circulated.

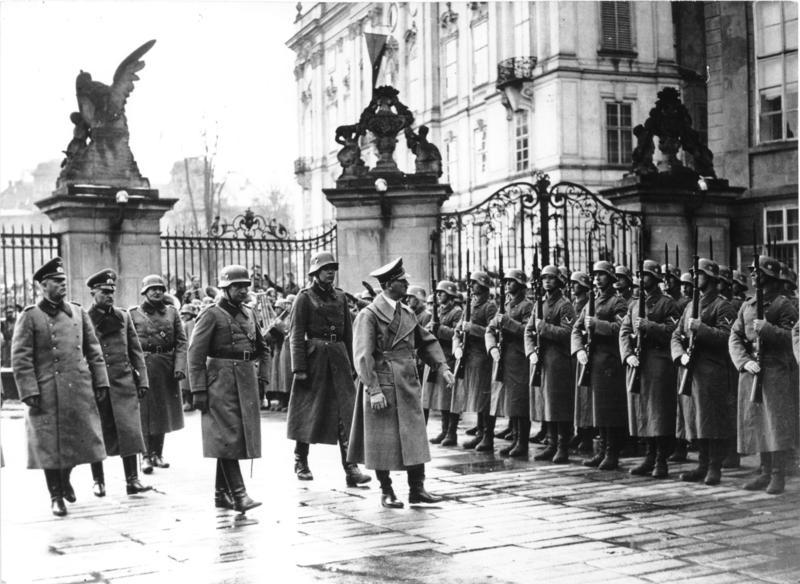
Adolf Hitler at Prague Castle

==== The Arsenal of the Reich ====
Shortly before World War II, Czechoslovakia ceased to exist. Its territory was divided into the Protectorate of Bohemia and Moravia, the newly declared Slovak State and the short-lived Republic of Carpathian Ukraine. While much of former Czechoslovakia came under the control of Nazi Germany, Hungarian forces swiftly overran the Carpathian Ukraine. Hungary annexed some areas (e.g., Southern Slovakia and Carpathian Ruthenia) in the autumn of 1938. Poland reclaimed Zaolzie previously annexed by the Czechs during the Polish-Soviet war in 1920. The Zaolzie region became part of Nazi Germany after the German invasion of Poland in September 1939.

The German economy—burdened by heavy militarisation—urgently needed foreign currency. Setting up an artificially high exchange rate between the Czechoslovak koruna and the Reichsmark brought consumer goods to Germans (and soon created shortages in the Czech lands).

Czechoslovakia had fielded a modern army of 35 divisions and was a major manufacturer of machine guns, tanks, and artillery, most of them assembled in the Škoda factory in Plzeň. Many Czech factories continued to produce Czech designs until converted to German designs. Czechoslovakia also had other major manufacturing companies. Entire steel and chemical factories were moved from Czechoslovakia and reassembled in Linz (which incidentally remains a heavily industrialized area of Austria). In a speech delivered in the Reichstag, Hitler stressed the military importance of occupation, noting that by occupying Czechoslovakia, Germany gained 2,175 field cannons, 469 tanks, 500 anti-aircraft artillery pieces, 43,000 machine guns, 1,090,000 military rifles, 114,000 pistols, about a billion rounds of ammunition and three million anti-aircraft shells. This amount of weaponry would be sufficient to arm about half of the then Wehrmacht. Czechoslovak weaponry later played a major part in the German conquests of Poland (1939) and France (1940).

Heydrich during his time as Reichsprotektor brought about increases in rations for workers in the armaments industry, improved welfare services, free shoes and for a short time, a five-day work week as Saturday was made a holiday. The National Union of Employees was remolded in the style of the Nazi pseudo-union, the German Labour Front, to provide free sports events, films, concerts and plays for the workers. Heydrich sought to portray himself as the friend of the Czech working class, even meeting a group of selected Czech workers on 24 October 1941 in a photo-op to show his supposed concern for the Czech workers. Heydrich cynically called his policy "optical effects" as he believed that mere gestures such as free showings of films at the local cinemas and free sports matches could win the support of the working class and increase productivity in the war industries. However, inflation was rampant and wage increases failed to keep up with the cost of living, causing the workers to frequently grumble about their conditions.

==== Czechoslovak resistance ====
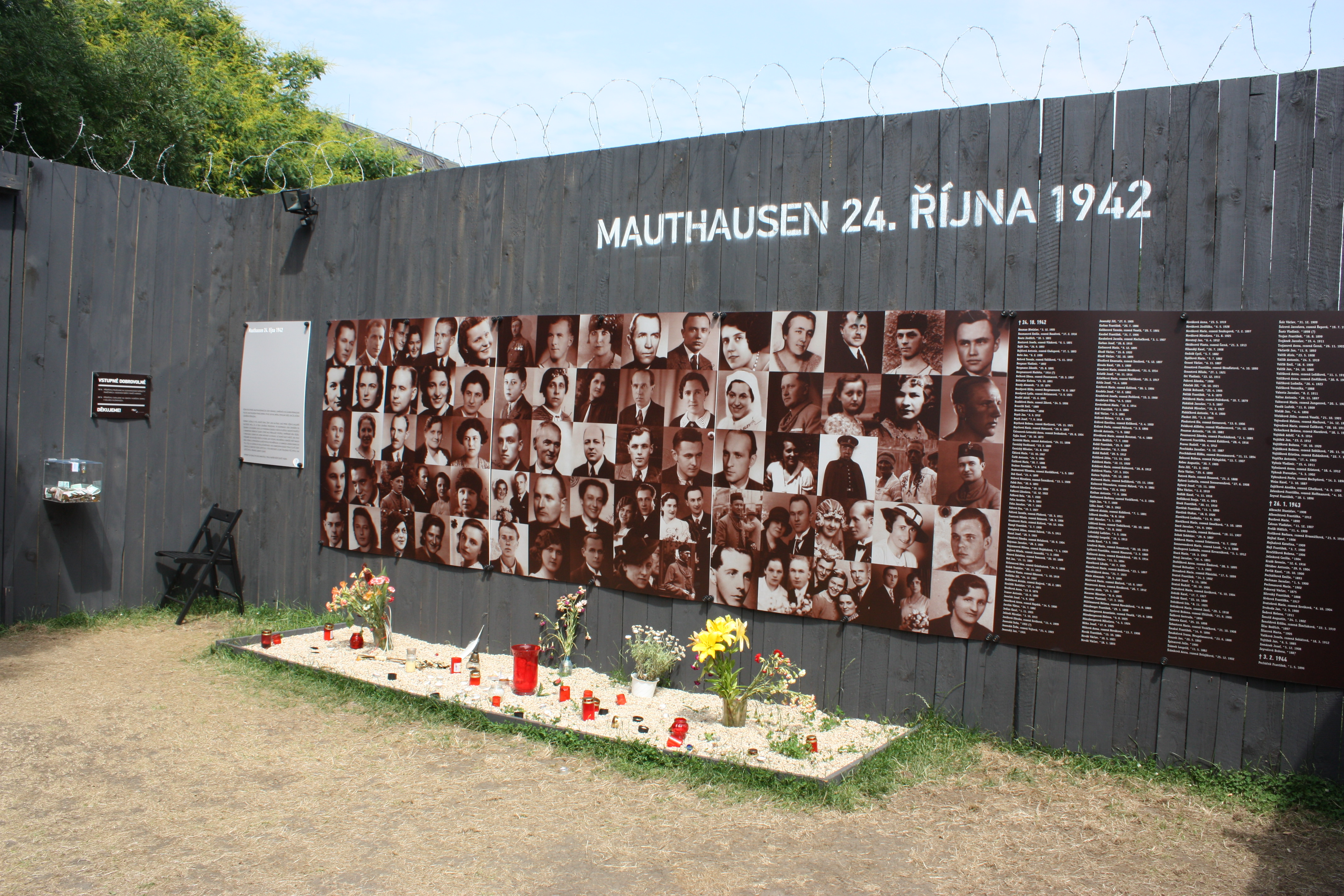
The relatives of Czech paratroopers Jan Kubiš and Josef Valčík and their fellows, in total 254 people, were executed en masse on 24 October 1942 in Mauthausen concentration camp.

Beneš—the leader of the Czechoslovak government-in-exile—and František Moravec—head of Czechoslovak military intelligence—organized and coordinated a resistance network. Hácha, Prime Minister Alois Eliáš, and the Czechoslovak resistance acknowledged Beneš's leadership. Active collaboration between London and the Czechoslovak home front was maintained throughout the war years. The most important event of the resistance was Operation Anthropoid, the assassination of Reinhard Heydrich, SS leader Heinrich Himmler's deputy and the then Protector of Bohemia and Moravia. Infuriated, Hitler ordered the arrest and execution of 10,000 randomly selected Czechs. Over 10,000 were arrested, and at least 1,300 were executed. According to one estimate, 5,000 were killed in reprisals. The assassination resulted in one of the most well-known reprisals of the war. The Nazis completely destroyed the villages of Lidice and Ležáky; all men over 16 years from the village were murdered, and the rest of the population was sent to Nazi concentration camps where many women and nearly all the children were killed.

The Czechoslovak resistance comprised four main groups:

- The army command coordinated with a multitude of spontaneous groupings to form the Defense of the Nation (Obrana národa, ON) with branches in Britain and France. Czechoslovak units and formations with Czechs (c. 65–70%), and Slovaks (c. 30%) served with the Polish Army (Czechoslovak Legion), the French Army, the Royal Air Force, the British Army (the 1st Czechoslovak Armoured Brigade), and the Red Army (I Czechoslovak Corps). Two thousand eighty-eight Czechs and 401 Slovaks fought in 11th Infantry Battalion-East alongside the British during the war in areas such as North Africa and Palestine. Among others, Czech fighter pilot, Sergeant Josef František was one of the most successful fighter pilots in the Battle of Britain.
- Beneš's collaborators, led by Prokop Drtina, created the Political Center (Politické ústředí, PÚ). The PÚ was nearly destroyed by arrests in November 1939, after which younger politicians took control.
- Social democrats and leftist intellectuals, in association with such groups as trade unions and educational institutions, constituted the Committee of the Petition that We Remain Faithful (Petiční výbor Věrni zůstaneme, PVVZ).
- The Communist Party of Czechoslovakia (KSČ) was the fourth major resistance group. The KSČ had been one of over 20 political parties in the democratic First Republic, but it had never gained sufficient votes to unsettle the democratic government. After the Munich Agreement, the leadership of the KSČ moved to Moscow and the party went underground. Until 1943, however, KSČ resistance was weak. The 1939 Molotov–Ribbentrop Pact, a non-aggression agreement between Nazi Germany and the Soviet Union, had left the KSČ in disarray. But ever faithful to the Soviet line, the KSČ began a more active struggle against the Germans after Operation Barbarossa, Germany's attack on the Soviet Union in June 1941.

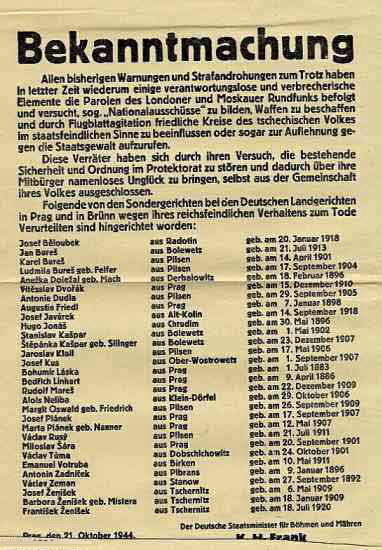
The names of executed Czechs, 21 October 1944

The democratic groups—ON, PÚ, and PVVZ—united in early 1940 and formed the Central Committee of the Home Resistance (Ústřední výbor odboje domácího, ÚVOD). Involved primarily in intelligence gathering, the ÚVOD cooperated with a Soviet intelligence organization in Prague. Following the German invasion of the Soviet Union in June 1941, the democratic groups attempted to create a united front that would include the KSČ. Heydrich's appointment in the fall thwarted these efforts. By mid-1942, the Germans had succeeded in exterminating the most experienced elements of the Czechoslovak resistance forces.

Czechoslovak forces regrouped in 1942–1943. The Council of the Three (R3)—in which the communist underground was also represented—emerged as the focal point of the resistance. The R3 prepared to assist the liberating armies of the U.S. and the Soviet Union. In cooperation with Red Army partisan units, the R3 developed a guerrilla structure.

Guerrilla activity intensified with a rising number of parachuted units in 1944, leading to the establishment of partisan groups such as 1st Czechoslovak Partisan Brigade of Jan Žižka, Jan Kozina Brigade or Master Jan Hus Brigade, and especially after the formation of a provisional Czechoslovak government in Košice on 4 April 1945. "National committees" took over the administration of towns as the Germans were expelled. More than 4,850 such committees were formed between 1944 and the end of the war under the supervision of the Red Army. On 5 May, a national uprising began spontaneously in Prague, and the newly formed Czech National Council (cs) almost immediately assumed leadership of the revolt. Over 1,600 barricades were erected throughout the city, and some 30,000 Czech men and women battled for three days against 40,000 German troops backed by tanks, aircraft and artillery. On 8 May, the German Wehrmacht capitulated; Soviet troops arrived on 9 May.

==== German policy ====
There are sources that highlighted the more favorable treatment of the Czechs during the German occupation in comparison to the treatment of the Poles and the Ukrainians. This is attributed to the view within the Nazi hierarchy that a large swath of the populace was "capable of Aryanization," hence, the Czechs were not subjected to a similar degree of random and organized acts of brutality that their Polish counterparts experienced. Such capacity for Aryanization was supported by the position that part of the Czech population had German ancestry. On the other hand, the Czechs/Slavs were not considered by the Germans as a racial equal due to its classification as a mixture of races with Jewish and Asiatic influences. This was illustrated in a series of discussion, which denigrated it as less valuable and, specifically, the Czechs as "dangerous and must be handled differently from Aryan peoples."

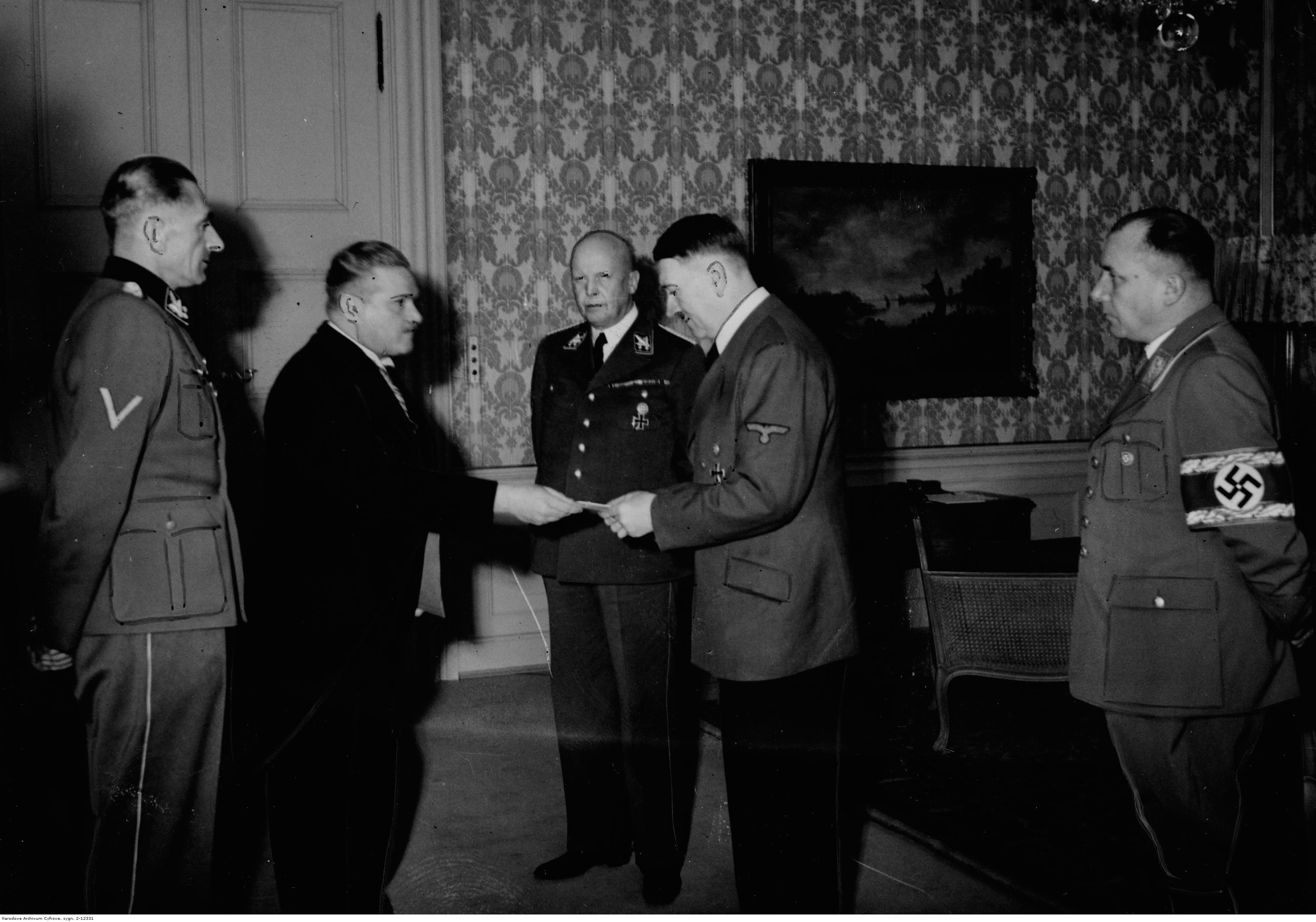
Adolf Hitler and prime minister Jaroslav Krejčí at the celebration of the fifth anniversary of the Protectorate of Bohemia and Moravia held at Klessheim Castle. 15 March 1944

A paradox of German policy was that the collaborators such as Hácha were held in contempt by the Nazis as "riff raff" while those who clung most defiantly to their sense of Czech identity were considered to be the better subjects of Germanizaton. Heydrich in a report to Berlin stated that Hácha was "incapable of Germanization" as "he is always sick, arrives with a trembling voice and attempts to evoke pity that demands our mercy". By contrast, Heydrich had a grudging respect for Elias, noting that he was youthful, healthy, and a determined defender of Czech interests, which led Heydrich to conclude that he must have some German blood.

Aside from the inconsistency of animosity towards Slavs, there is also the fact that the forceful but restrained policy in Czechoslovakia was partly driven by the need to keep the population nourished and complacent so that it can carry out the vital work of arms production in the factories. By 1939, the country was already serving as a major hub of military production for Germany, manufacturing aircraft, tanks, artillery, and other armaments.

==== Slovak National Uprising ====
The Slovak National Uprising ("1944 Uprising") was an armed struggle between German Wehrmacht forces and rebel Slovak troops August–October 1944. It was centered at Banská Bystrica.

The rebel Slovak Army, formed to fight the Germans, had an estimated 18,000 soldiers in August, a total which first increased to 47,000 after mobilisation on 9 September 1944, and later to 60,000, plus 20,000 partisans. However, in late August, German troops were able to disarm the Eastern Slovak Army, which was the best equipped, and thus significantly decreased the power of the Slovak Army. Many members of this force were sent to Nazi concentration camps; others escaped and joined partisan units.

The Slovaks were aided in the Uprising by soldiers and partisans from the Soviet Union, United Kingdom, US, France, the Czech Republic, and Poland. In total, 32 nations were involved in the Uprising.

==== Czechoslovak government-in-exile ====
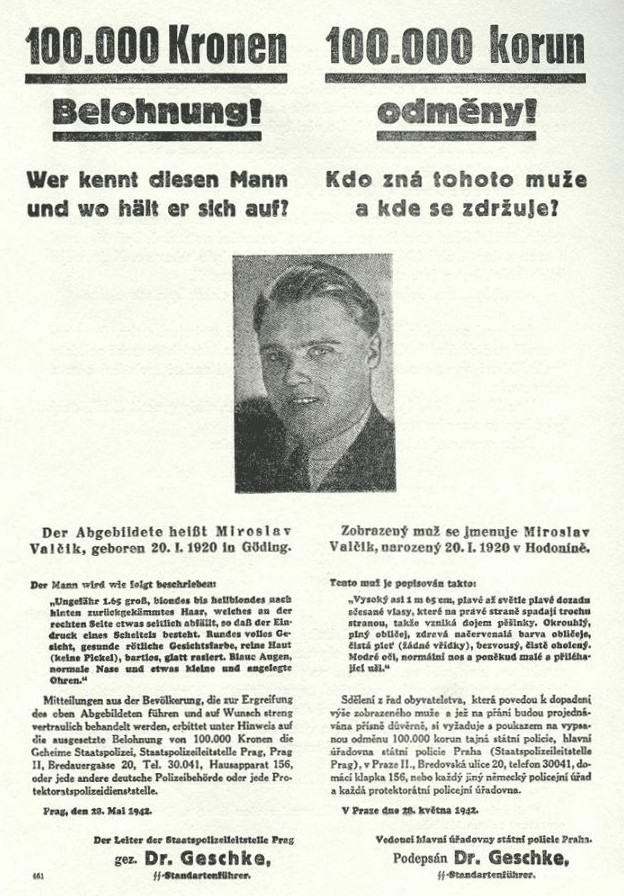
Reward poster for Josef Valčík, one of the assassins of Reinhard Heydrich

Edvard Beneš resigned as president of the First Czechoslovak Republic on 5 October 1938 after the Nazi coup. In London, he and other Czechoslovak exiles organized a Czechoslovak government-in-exile and negotiated to obtain international recognition for the government and a renunciation of the Munich Agreement and its consequences. After World War II broke out, a Czechoslovak national committee was constituted in France, and under Beneš's presidency sought international recognition as the exiled government of Czechoslovakia. This attempt led to some minor successes, such as the French-Czechoslovak treaty of 2 October 1939, which allowed for the reconstitution of the Czechoslovak army on French territory, yet full recognition was not reached. The Czechoslovak army in France was established on 24 January 1940, and units of its 1st Infantry Division took part in the last stages of the Battle of France, as did some Czechoslovak fighter pilots in various French fighter squadrons.

Beneš hoped for a restoration of the Czechoslovak state in its pre-Munich form after the anticipated Allied victory, a false hope. The government in exile—with Beneš as president of republic—was set up in June 1940 in exile in London, with the President living at Aston Abbotts. On 18 July 1940, it was recognised by the British government. Belatedly, the Soviet Union (in the summer of 1941) and the U.S. (in the winter) recognised the exiled government. In 1942, Allied repudiation of the Munich Agreement established the political and legal continuity of the First Republic and de jure recognition of Beneš's de facto presidency. The success of Operation Anthropoid—which resulted in the British-backed assassination of one of Hitler's top henchmen, Reichsprotektor of Bohemia and Moravia Reinhard Heydrich, by Jozef Gabčík and Jan Kubiš on 27 May—influenced the Allies in this repudiation.

The Munich Agreement had been precipitated by the subversive activities of the Sudeten Germans. During the latter years of the war, Beneš worked toward resolving the German minority problem and received consent from the Allies for a solution based on a postwar transfer of the Sudeten German population. The First Republic had been committed to a Western policy in foreign affairs. The Munich Agreement was the outcome. Beneš determined to strengthen Czechoslovak security against future German aggression through alliances with Poland and the Soviet Union. The Soviet Union, however, objected to a tripartite Czechoslovak-Polish-Soviet commitment. In December 1943, Beneš's government concluded a treaty just with the Soviets.

Beneš's interest in maintaining friendly relations with the Soviet Union was motivated also by his desire to avoid Soviet encouragement of a post-war communist coup in Czechoslovakia. Beneš worked to bring Czechoslovak communist exiles in Britain into cooperation with his government, offering far-reaching concessions, including the nationalization of heavy industry and the creation of local people's committees at the war's end. In March 1945, he gave key cabinet positions to Czechoslovak communist exiles in Moscow.

Especially after the German reprisals for the assassination of Reinhard Heydrich, most of the Czech resistance groups demanded, with eerie irony and based on Nazi terror during the occupation, ethnic cleansing or the "final solution of the German question" (Czech: konečné řešení německé otázky) which would have to be "solved" by deportation of the ethnic Germans from their homeland. These reprisals included massacres in villages Lidice and Ležáky, although these villages were not connected with Czech resistance.

These demands were adopted by the government-in-exile, which sought the support of the Allies for this proposal, beginning in 1943. During the occupation of Czechoslovakia, the Government-in-Exile promulgated a series of laws that are now referred to as the "Beneš decrees". One part of these decrees dealt with the status of ethnic Germans and Hungarians in postwar Czechoslovakia, and laid the ground for the deportation of some 3,000,000 Germans and Hungarians from the land that had been their home for centuries (see expulsion of Germans from Czechoslovakia, and Hungarians in Slovakia). The Beneš decrees declared that German property was to be confiscated without compensation. However, the final agreement authorizing the forced population transfer of the Germans was not reached until 2 August 1945 at the end of the Potsdam Conference.

=== End of the war ===
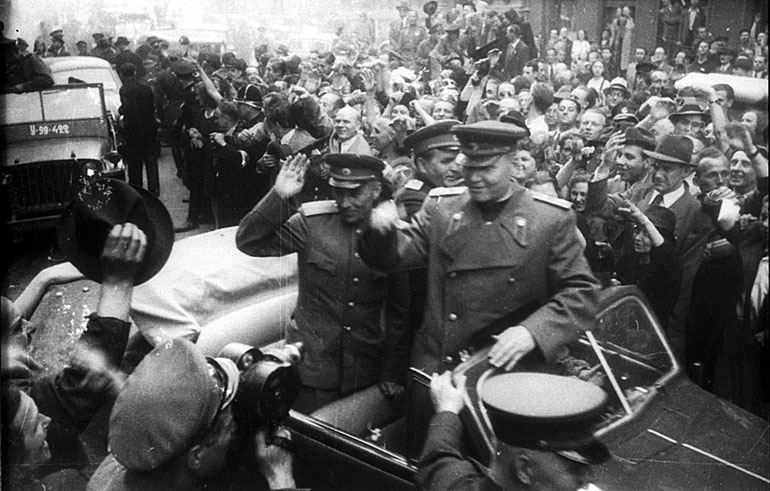
Residents of Prague greet the Marshal of the Soviet Union Ivan Konev.

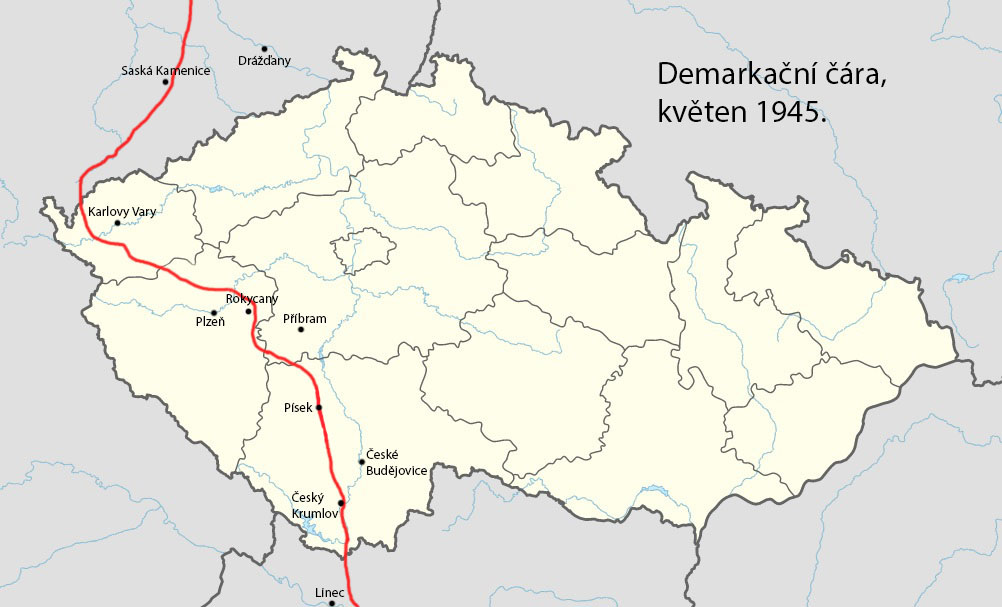
Demarcation line between the Soviet and American armies, May 1945

==== Liberation of Czechoslovakia ====
On 8 May 1944, Beneš signed an agreement with Soviet leaders stipulating that "Czechoslovak territory liberated by Soviet armies" would be placed under Czechoslovak civilian control.

On 21 September, Czechoslovak troops formed in the Soviet-liberated village, Kalinov, which was the first liberated settlement of Slovakia, located near the Dukla Pass in northeastern part of the country. Slovakia and the Czech lands were occupied mostly by Soviet troops (the Red Army), supported by Czech and Slovak resistance, from the east to the west; only southwestern Bohemia was liberated by other Allied troops from the west. Even at the end of the war, German troops massacred Czech civilians; the Massacre in Trhová Kamenice and the Massacre at Javoříčko are examples of this.

A provisional Czechoslovak government was established by the Soviets in the eastern Slovak city of Košice on 4 April 1945. "National committees" (supervised by the Red Army) took over the administration of towns as the Germans were expelled. Bratislava was taken by the Soviets on 4 April.

On April 18th, 1945, elements of the U.S. 90th Infantry Division of General George S. Patton’s U.S. 3rd Army crossed the western border of the former Czechoslovakia border near the town of Cheb, effectively cutting Germany in half. Elements of the 3rd Army would probe the Czech border for the rest of April, moving parallel down the border in an advance towards Linz, Austria. However beginning in the last days of April, into May 1945, elements would begin offensive operations westward into the country towards the city of Prague. Resistance would be fierce in some locations however much the German resistance in the American advance crumbled, the 11th Panzer Division surrendered its complete strength to elements of the U.S. 2nd Infantry Division in the last days of the war near Pilsen. The most notable action of the American liberation of Czechoslovakia was the liberation of the city of Pilsen on May 6th, 1945 where the 16th Armored Division with elements of the 2nd Infantry Division and 97th Infantry Division secured the city with minimal casualties, it was the last city taken by the U.S. Army in the European Theater in WWII.

On 5 May 1945, in the last moments of the war in Europe, the Prague uprising (Czech: Pražské povstání) began. It was an attempt by the Czech resistance to liberate the city of Prague from German occupation during World War II. The uprising went on until 8 May 1945, ending in a ceasefire the day before the arrival of the Red Army and one day after Victory in Europe Day.

Prague was taken on 9 May by Soviet troops during the Prague Offensive which had begun on 6 May and ended by 11 May. When the Soviets arrived, Prague was already in a general state of confusion due to the Prague Uprising. Soviet and other Allied troops were withdrawn from Czechoslovakia in the same year.

It is estimated that about 345,000 World War II casualties were from Czechoslovakia, 277,000 of them Jews. As many as 144,000 Soviet troops died during the liberation of Czechoslovakia.

==== Annexation of Subcarpathian Ruthenia by the Soviet Union ====
In October 1944, Subcarpathian Ruthenia was taken by the Soviets. A Czechoslovak delegation under František Němec was dispatched to the area. The delegation was to mobilize the liberated local population to form a Czechoslovak army and to prepare for elections in cooperation with recently established national committees. Loyalty to a Czechoslovak state was tenuous in Carpathian Ruthenia. Beneš's proclamation of April 1944 excluded former collaborationist Hungarians, Germans and the Rusynophile Ruthenian followers of Andrej Bródy and the Fencik Party (who had collaborated with the Hungarians) from political participation. This amounted to approximately 1/3 of the population. Another 1/3 was communist, leaving 1/3 of the population presumably sympathetic to the Czechoslovak Republic.

Upon arrival in Subcarpathian Ruthenia, the Czechoslovak delegation set up headquarters in Khust, and on 30 October issued a mobilization proclamation. Soviet military forces prevented both the printing and the posting of the Czechoslovak proclamation and proceeded instead to organize the local population. Protests from Beneš's government were ignored. Soviet activities led much of the local population to believe that Soviet annexation was imminent. The Czechoslovak delegation was also prevented from establishing a cooperative relationship with the local national committees promoted by the Soviets. On 19 November, the communists—meeting in Mukachevo—issued a resolution requesting separation of Subcarpathian Ruthenia from Czechoslovakia and incorporation into the Ukrainian Soviet Socialist Republic. On 26 November, the Congress of National Committees unanimously accepted the resolution of the communists. The congress elected the National Council and instructed that a delegation be sent to Moscow to discuss union. The Czechoslovak delegation was asked to leave Subcarpathian Ruthenia. Negotiations between the Czechoslovak government and Moscow ensued. Both Czech and Slovak communists encouraged Beneš to cede Subcarpathian Ruthenia. The Soviet Union agreed to postpone annexation until the postwar period to avoid compromising Beneš's policy based on the pre-Munich frontiers.

The treaty ceding Carpathian Ruthenia to the Soviet Union was signed in June 1945. Czechs and Slovaks living in Subcarpathian Ruthenia and Ruthenians (Rusyns) living in Czechoslovakia were given the choice of Czechoslovak or Soviet citizenship.

==== Expulsion of Germans from Czechoslovakia ====
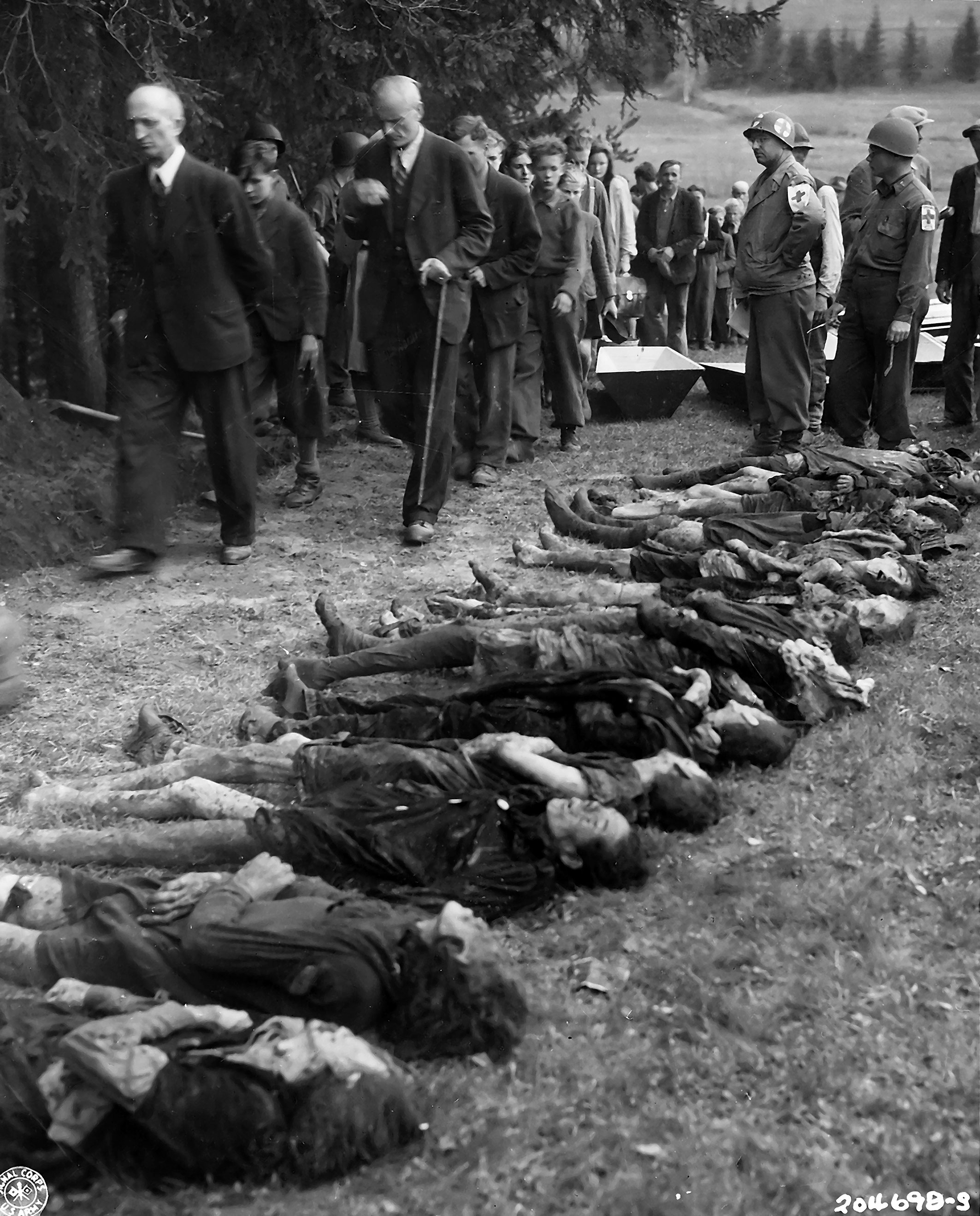
Sudeten Germans are forced to walk past the bodies of 30 Jewish women starved to death by German SS troops.

In May 1945, Czechoslovak troops took possession of the borderland. A Czechoslovak administrative commission composed exclusively of Czechs was established. Sudeten Germans were subjected to restrictive measures and conscripted for compulsory labor. On 15 June, however, Beneš called Czechoslovak authorities to order. In July, Czechoslovak representatives addressed the Potsdam Conference (the U.S., Britain and the Soviet Union) and presented plans for a "humane and orderly transfer" of the Sudeten German population. There were substantial exceptions from expulsions that applied to about 244,000 ethnic Germans who were allowed to remain in Czechoslovakia.

The following groups of ethnic Germans were not deported:

- anti-fascists
- persons crucial for industries
- those married to ethnic Czechs

It is estimated that between 700,000 and 800,000 Germans were affected by "wild" expulsions between May and August 1945. The expulsions were encouraged by Czechoslovak politicians and were generally carried out by the order of local authorities, mostly by groups of armed volunteers. However, in some cases it was initiated or pursued by assistance of the regular army.

The expulsion according to the Potsdam Conference proceeded from 25 January 1946 until October of that year. An estimated 1.6 million ethnic Germans were deported to the American zone of what would become West Germany. An estimated 800,000 were deported to the Soviet zone (in what would become East Germany). Several thousand died violently during the expulsion and many more died from hunger and illness as a consequence. These casualties include violent deaths and suicides, deaths in internment camps and natural causes. The joint Czech-German commission of historians stated in 1996 the following numbers: The deaths caused by violence and abnormal living conditions amount to approximately 10,000 persons killed. Another 5,000–6,000 people died of unspecified reasons related to expulsion making the total number of victims of the expulsion 15,000–16,000 (this excludes suicides, which make another approximately 3,400 cases).

Approximately 225,000 Germans remained in Czechoslovakia, of whom 50,000 emigrated or were expelled soon after.

== See also ==
- Battle of Czajánek's barracks
- British Committee for Refugees from Czechoslovakia
- Czechoslovak border fortifications – built 1935–1938 against Germany
- Fall Grün, the German invasion plan for Czechoslovakia rendered obsolete by the Munich Agreement
- Hodonín concentration camp
- International Students' Day
- Lety concentration camp
- Karel Pavlík
- Western betrayal

== Sources ==
Detlef Prössel : ´Sudeteneinmarsch 1938` - 2023/2024 veröffentlicht - deproe@t-online.de - Brandenburg an der Havel - ISBN : Hardcover 978-3-384-08910-6 - über 1000 Seiten mit detaillierten Überblick der Ereignisse um den Sudeteneinmarsch im Oktober 1938 - BookTitle - treditition6.webShop

- Bryant, Chad (2009). Prague in Black Nazi Rule and Czech Nationalism. Harvard University Press: Cambridge. ISBN 978-0-674-26166-2.
- Gruner, Wolf (2015). "Protectorate of Bohemia and Moravia". The Greater German Reich and the Jews: Nazi Persecution Policies in the Annexed Territories 1935–1945. War and Genocide. Berghahn Books. pp. 99–135. ISBN 978-1-78238-444-1.
- Mahoney, William (2011), The History of the Czech Republic and Slovakia, Santa Barbara: Greenwood Publishing Group, ISBN 978-0-313-36305-4
- Miller, Daniel (2005). "The Czech Republic". In Richard C. Frucht (ed.). Eastern Europe An Introduction to the People, Lands, and Culture. Santa Monica: ABC-CLIO. pp. 203–283. ISBN 978-1-57607-800-6.
- Murray, Williamson (1984). The Change in the European Balance of Power, 1938–1940. Princeton: Princeton University Press.
- Overy, Richard (1999). "Germany and the Munich Crisis: A Multilated Victory?". In Igor Lukes & Erik Goldstein (ed.). The Munich Crisis, 1938, Prelude to World War II. London: Frank Cass. pp. 191–215. ISBN 0-7146-8056-7.
- Rothwell, Victor (2001). The Origins of the Second World War. Manchester: Manchester University Press. ISBN 978-0-7190-5958-2.
- Tooze, Adam (2006). The Wages of Destruction The Making and Breaking of the Nazi Economy. London: Allan Lane. ISBN 978-0-7139-9566-4.
