= Battle of Czajánek's barracks =

1939 battle of the German invasion of Czechoslovakia

Coordinates: 49°40′40.1″N 18°20′40.42″E

- Part of the German invasion of Czechoslovakia
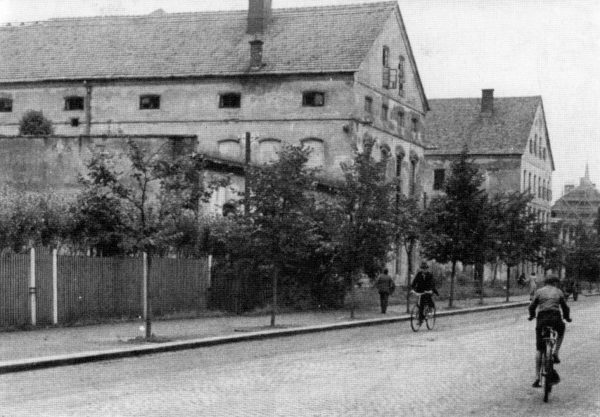
- Čajánek's barracks in 1938
Date	14 March 1939
Location	Frýdek-Místek, Czech Silesia, Czechoslovakia
Result	German occupation of the barracks

Belligerents
Czechoslovakia	Germany

Commanders and leaders
Karel Pavlík	Paul Stoewer

Strength
250–300	1,200

Casualties and losses
3 wounded	6–18 killed
- Battle location in modern Czech Republic

The Battle of Czajánek's barracks (Czech: Bitva o Czajankovu kasárnu) was a confrontation between the Czechoslovak and German armies, which took place on 14 March 1939 in the course of the German occupation of Czechoslovakia. Together with a clash which allegedly took place at Moravská Třebová, this was the only known active Czechoslovak resistance to the German Army during the occupation of Bohemia and Moravia in March 1939. The battle took place simply because German forces cut Czechoslovak communication lines too early, and the army unit stationed in the barracks failed to receive the general order to surrender. 6 to 18 German soldiers were killed in the fighting.

== Background ==
The German invasion of Czechoslovakia started on the evening of 14 March 1939, a day before the original date set by Adolf Hitler. The German goal was to take control of the industrial region of Ostrava as soon as possible, in order to prevent anticipated Polish invasion into the territory. The Czech army was under orders to hand their positions over without resistance.

== Battle ==
The area of Frýdek-Místek was the operational responsibility of the 8th Infantry Division of the Wehrmacht (28th Infantry Division), together with the elite motorized regiment "Leibstandarte SS Adolf Hitler". At 17:30 on 14 March, both units marched from the Sudetenland towards Ostrava. The 84th Infantry regiment led the advance, and by 18:00 they reached Místek.

The barracks in the town had been built at the time of the Austro-Hungarian Empire and housed the 8th Infantry Regiment. The garrison was undermanned at the time since the ethnic German, Hungarian, and Slovak soldiers deserted if they felt that their place was in an independent Slovakia. Most of the Czech soldiers who were left were new recruits; most of them had been in the army for mere 14 days.

The highest-ranking officer at the barracks was captain Karel Pavlík, commander of the 12th machine gun company. His second-in-command was lieutenant Karel Martínek. Pavlík and some 30 other seasoned officers came to the barracks only earlier that day to attend a Polish-language course.

The German military convoy stopped on the road leading to the barracks, and a German officer with a couple of soldiers started walking towards the main gate. A Czech sentry, private first class Bohuslav Přibyla, ordered the German officer to stop, however, he continued forward with his pistol in hand. After this, Přibyla discharged a warning shot in the direction of the officer, who reacted by shooting at the sentry, wounding him slightly on his head. Přibyla returned fire, wounding the officer.

After learning of the German advance, Pavlík had set two improvised trenches in front of the barracks and ordered the deployment of the bulk of the troops on the second store. They were armed with rifles, machine guns and 50 hand grenades.

The Germans formed a skirmish line in front of the barracks and attempted to assault the main entrance with a Sd.Kfz 221 armoured vehicle. The armoured carrier was hit by armour-piercing rounds and disabled. The garrison endured three German assaults before surrender. The second assault was preceded by a megaphone call to surrender from another armoured vehicle. Then, the German infantry, now including an anti-tank company, attacked the barracks with machine gun fire, 50mm and 81mm mortars and a 37mm anti-tank gun.

The Czech trench at the entrance was overrun by the attackers, but the resistance of Pavlík's men inside the building kept them outside the compound after a 40-minute battle. The commander of a German armoured carrier was killed, and two Czech soldiers were seriously wounded during the exchange. Pavlík, who was himself firing from a heavy machine gun positioned on the rooftop, attempted to summon an armoured column from one of the neighbour garrisons, to no avail.

At 7:00, Colonel Eliashberg, the battalion commander, issued orders by phone to cease fire under the threat of court-martial. Initially Pavlík ignored the orders, but the German fire became intense as they poured the barracks with anti-tank cannon and mortar rounds. After a night of fierce fighting, and low on ammunition, Pavlík ordered his men to cease fire.

== Aftermath ==
The Czech troops were disarmed by the Germans at the garrison's courtyard, who marched them into the local police station, where they were eventually dismissed; the Czech Army as a whole had been disbanded by then. Only 5,940 soldiers later re-enlisted into the new Vládní vojsko, the main security force of the Protectorate of Bohemia and Moravia. Karel Pavlík was allowed to retain the command of his men immediately after the surrender, and the German officers did not confiscate his personal weapon.

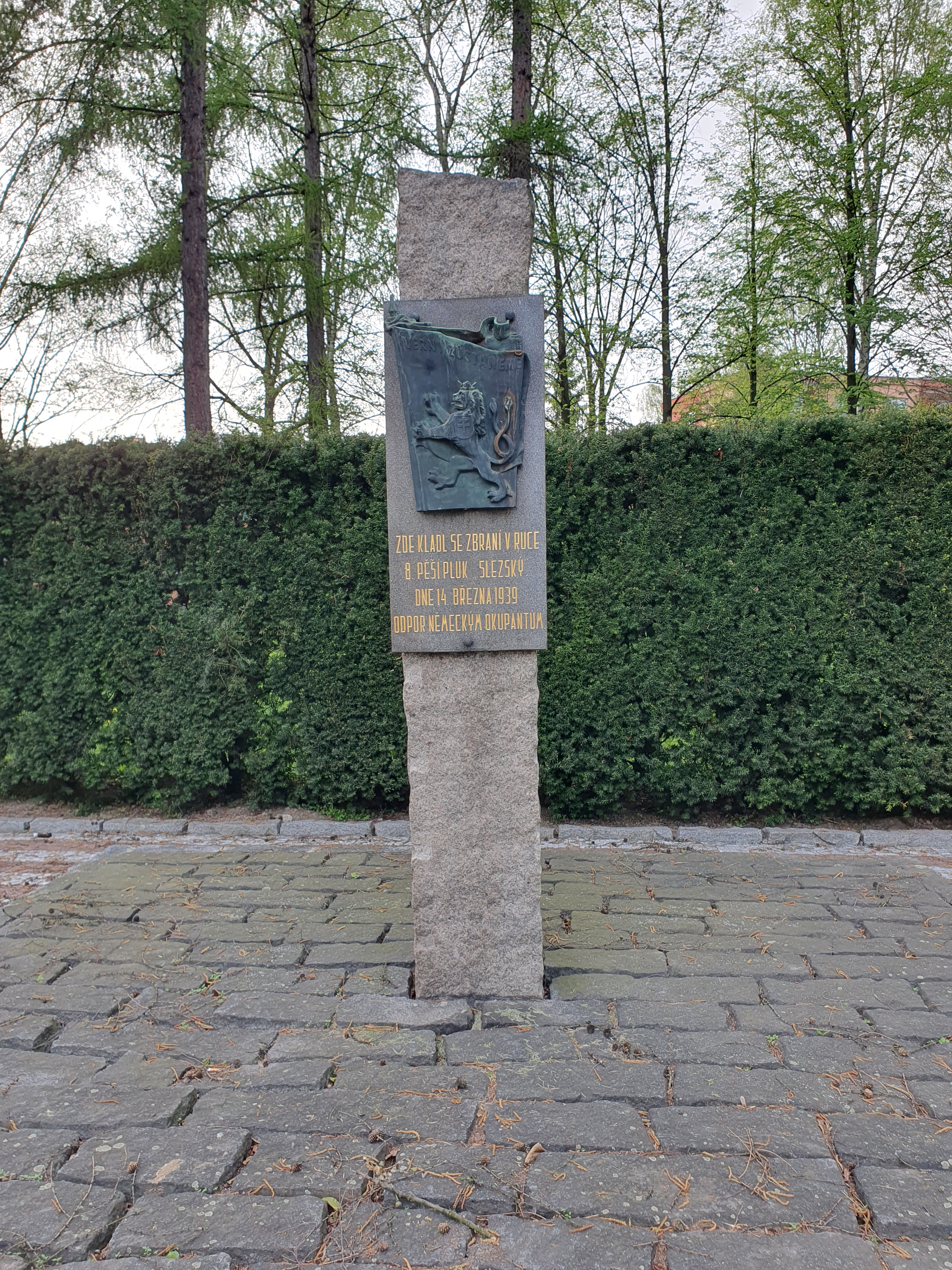
Memorial of the battle

Pavlík and Martínek later joined the Czech resistance; Pavlík began his clandestine activities against the Germans with the group Za Vlast, which helped Czechoslovak pilots run across the border. Then he moved to Prague where he joined the resistance group Obrana národa and cooperated with Václav Morávek. After the betrayal of Ladislav Vaněk in the group Jindra, Pavlík was captured by the Gestapo and later sent to Mauthausen concentration camp. After torture and questioning he was shot. His body was never found, and his symbolic grave is in Kostelec nad Černými lesy.

Martínek also joined the resistance. He carried out several sabotage actions, blowing up a German train at Lískovec, two highvoltage pylons and a number of telephone lines. He was eventually betrayed and handed over to the Germans. Martínek was rescued by American troops from Mauthausen in 1945. He later led an ill-fated anti-communist uprising and was jailed for 15 years. Martínek died of leukemia on 25 February 1975.

Czechoslovak president-in-exile Edvard Beneš often described the skirmish as a symbol of the heroic resistance of Silesian soldiers against the occupants during World War II. On July 18, 1946, Beneš visited the barracks and gave a speech to the surviving members of the battle, praising their actions.

== See also ==
- Sudeten German uprising
