= Hradové Střímelice =

Hradové Střimelice
- Village
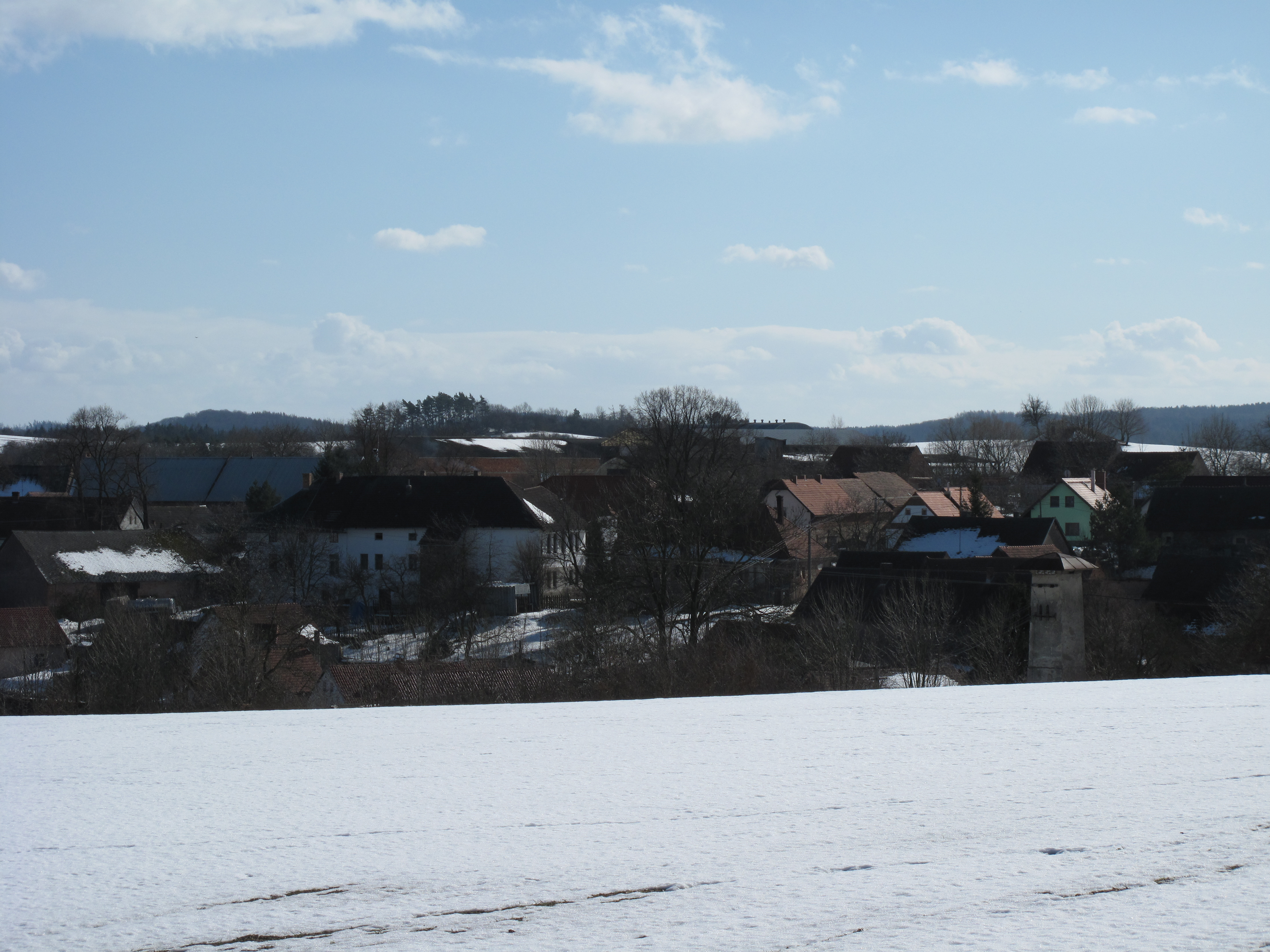
- View from the west
- Interactive map of Hradové Střimelice
- Coordinates: 49°54′8″N 14°49′0″E
- Country: Czech Republic
- Region: Central Bohemian
- District: Prague-East
- Municipality: Hostivice

Area
  - Total: 4.89 km^{2} (1.89 sq mi)
- Elevation: 398 m (1,306 ft)

Population (2011)
  - Total: 153
- Time zone: UTC+1 (CET)
  - Summer (DST): UTC+2 (CEST)
- Postal code: 281 63

Hradové Střímelice is a village and administrative part of Stříbrná Skalice in the Central Bohemian Region of the Czech Republic.

The area of Hradová Střimelice is 4.89 km².

== History ==
The first written mention of Hradové Střímelice is from 1320.

== Landmarks ==
- Defunct castle Hradové Střimelice from the 14th century on the northeastern edge of the village.
