= Carl Diener =

Austrian geographer, geologist and paleontologist

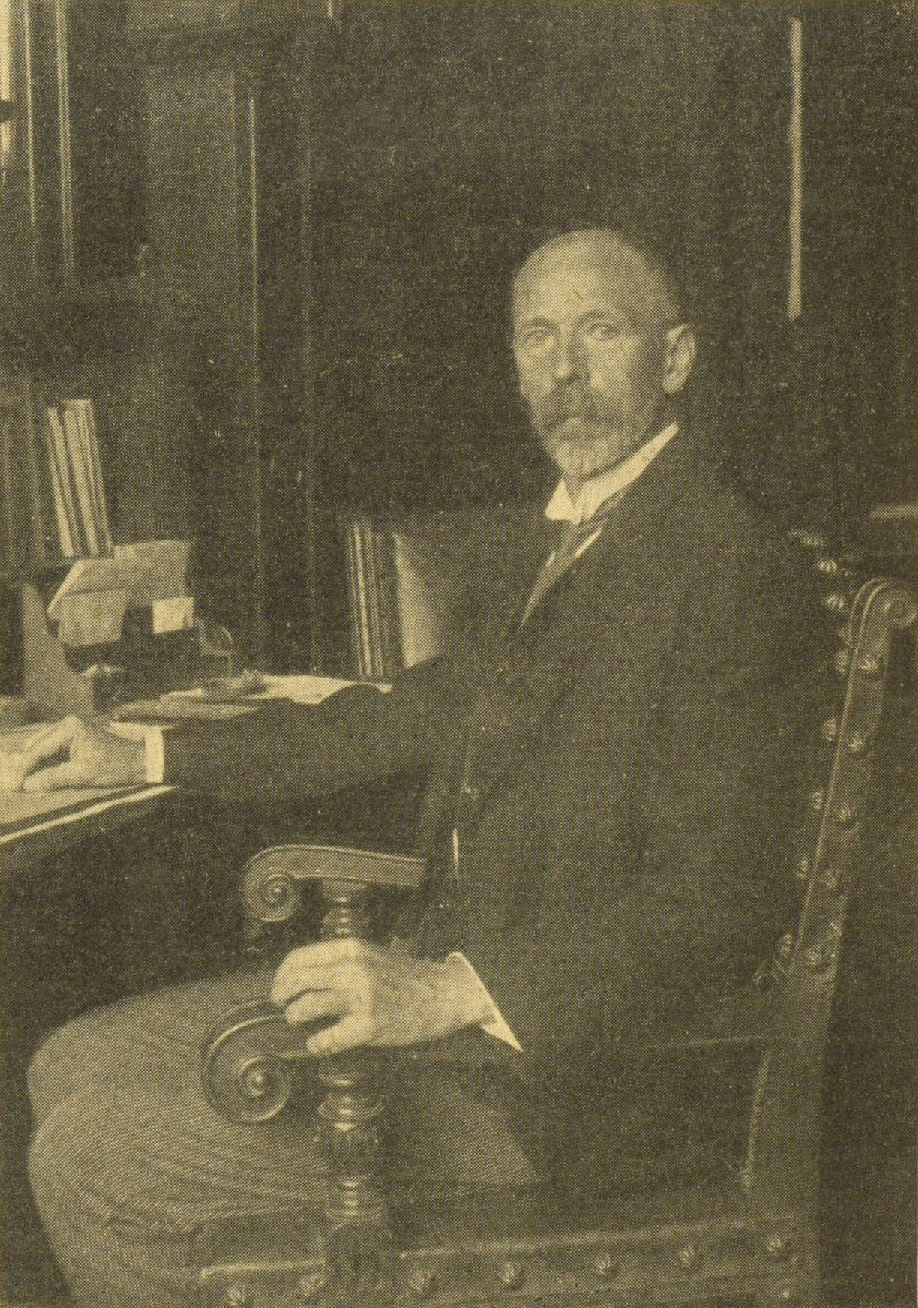
- Carl Diener (1922)
- Born: 11 December 1862; Vienna
- Died: 6 January 1928 (aged 65); Vienna
- Occupations: Geographer, geologist, paleontologist

Carl Diener (11 December 1862 – 6 January 1928) was an Austrian geographer, geologist and paleontologist.

== Biography ==
In 1883, he received his doctorate from the University of Vienna, where his instructors included Eduard Suess and Melchior Neumayr. In 1893, he changed his venia legendi from geography to geology, a subject for which he became an associate professor in 1897. In 1906, he was named a full professor of palaeontology at the University of Vienna.

He is best remembered for his geological (including stratigraphic) and faunistic investigations of the Alps. He also conducted important research on his numerous travels worldwide — Syria and Lebanon (1885), the Pyrenees (1886), the Himalayas (1892), Svalbard (1893), the Urals and the Caucasus (1897), North America (1901), et al. In 1895, with Wilhelm Heinrich Waagen, he proposed the Anisian Stage (a division of the Middle Triassic) as a replacement for the "Alpine Muschelkalk".

He was an avid mountaineer, and for a number of years was president of the Österreichischer Alpenverein (Austrian Alpine Club). He was also a member of the Alpine Club in London.

Diener Creek on Ellesmere Island is named after him, and indirectly the Dienerian substage of the Early Triassic epoch.

== Published works ==
With Viktor Uhlig, Rudolf Hoernes and Eduard Suess, he was co-author of the four-part Bau und bild Österreichs (1903), of which Diener wrote Part 2: Bau und bild der Ostalpen und des Karstgebietes (Construction and image of the eastern Alps and the karst areas). He also made major contributions to the paleontological bibliography, Fossilium Catalogus (1913 –). Diener's other noteworthy written efforts include:

- Libanon. Grundlinien der physischen Geographie und Geologie von Mittel-Syrien, 1886 – Lebanon: Outlines of physical geography and geology of central Syria.
- Der Gebirgsbau der Westalpen, 1891 – The mountain structure of the western Alps.
- Triadische Cephalopodenfaunen der ostsibirischen Küstenprovinz, 1895 – Triassic cephalopodic fauna of the east Siberian coastal region.
- Mittheilungen über einige Cephalopodensuiten aus der Trias der Südalpen, 1901 – On some cephalopod groups from the Triassic strata of the southern Alps.
- "Triassic faunae of Kashmir", 1913.
- Paläontologie und Abstammungslehre, 1920 – Paleontology and evolutionary theory.
- Ammonoidea permiana, 1921 – Permian Ammonoidea.
- Cnidaria triadica, 1921 – Triassic Cnidaria.
- Lamellibranchiata triadica, 1923 – Triassic Lamellibranchiata.
- Grundzüge der Biostratigraphie, 1925 – Outline of biostratigraphy.
