= Frýdek-Místek =

- Statutory city
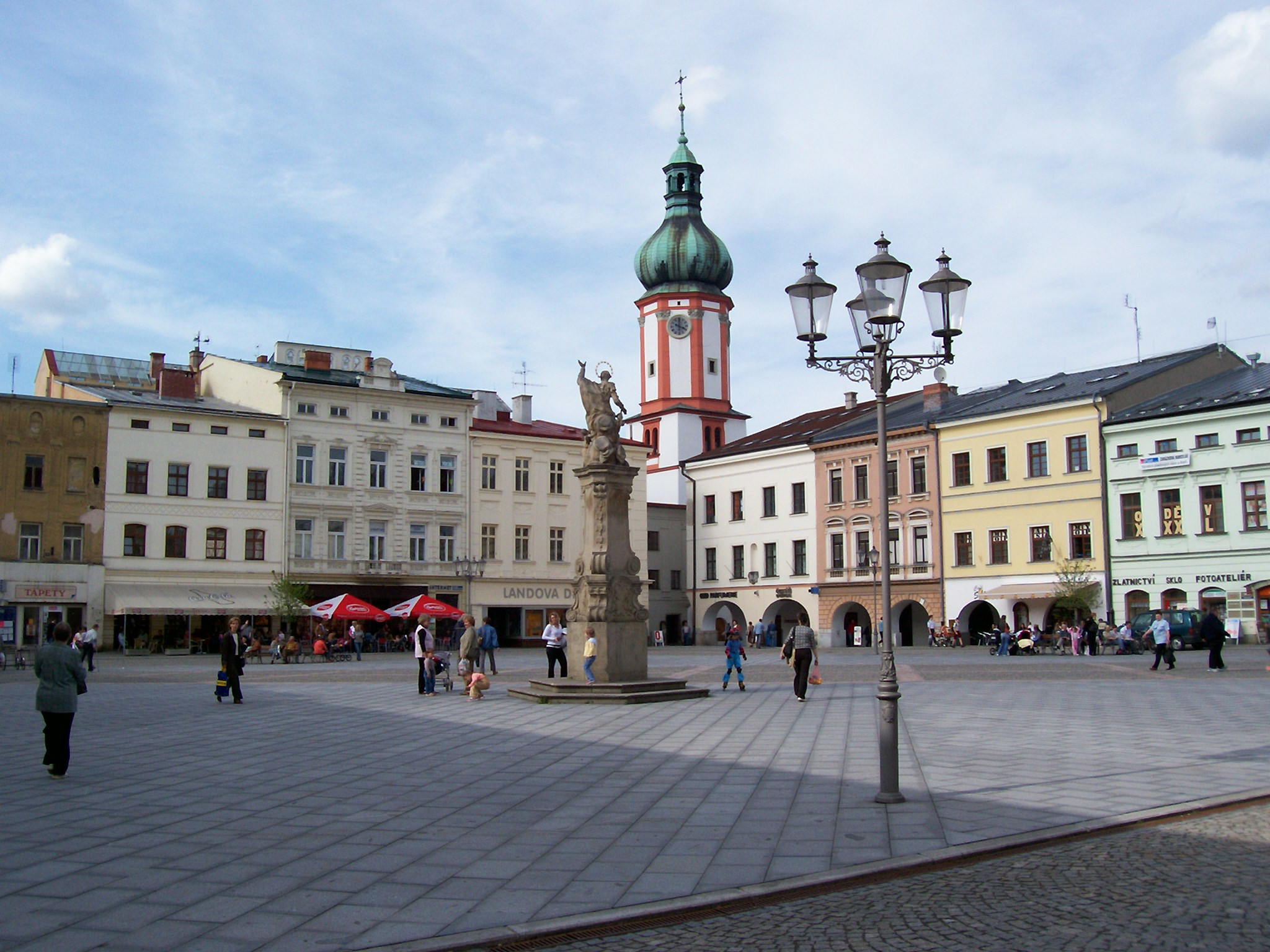
- Náměstí Svobody in Místek

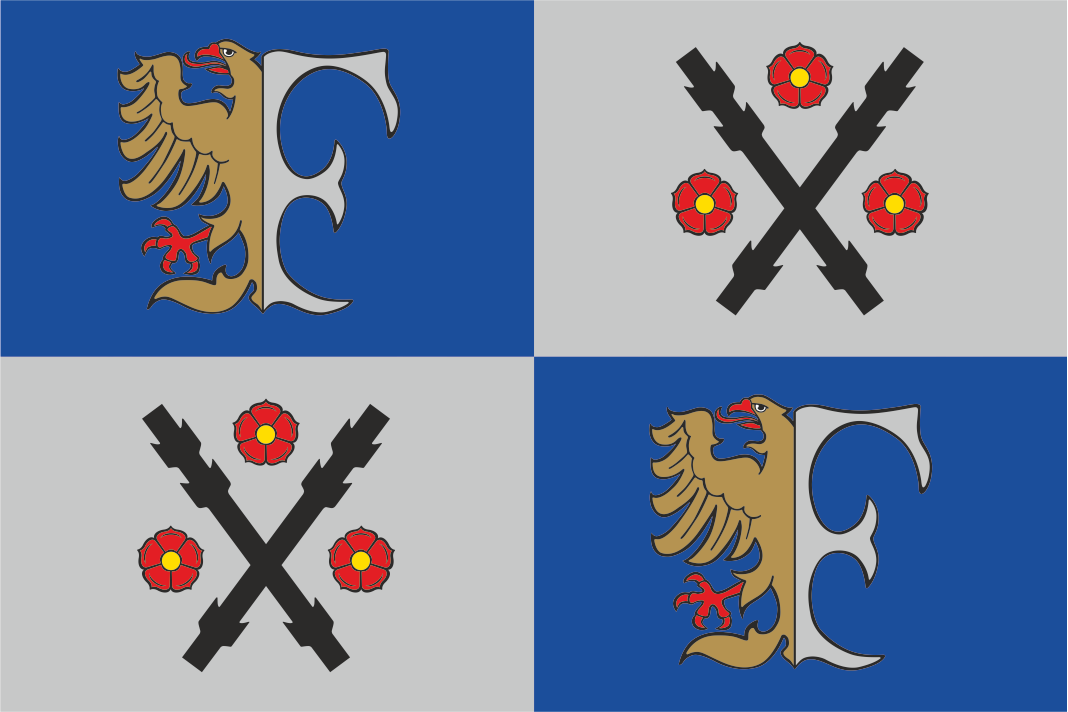
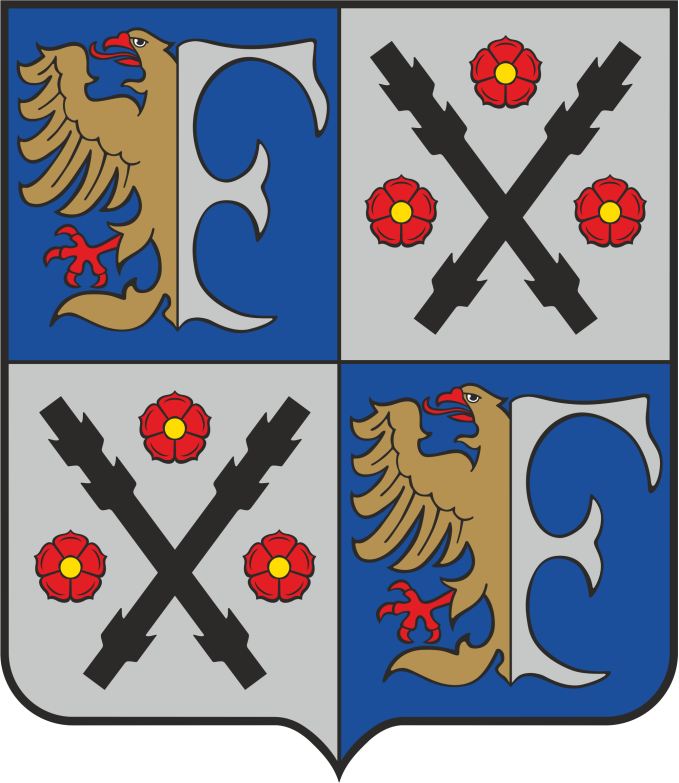
- Flag Coat of arms

- Location in the Czech Republic
- Coordinates: 49°41′17″N 18°21′13″E
- Country: Czech Republic
- Region: Moravian-Silesian
- District: Frýdek-Místek
- First mentioned: 1267
- Towns merged: 1943

Government
  - Mayor: Petr Korč (Naše Město F-M)

Area
  - Total: 51.56 km^{2} (19.91 sq mi)
- Elevation: 291 m (955 ft)

Population (2026-01-01)
  - Total: 53,164
  - Density: 1,031/km^{2} (2,671/sq mi)
- Time zone: UTC+1 (CET)
  - Summer (DST): UTC+2 (CEST)
- Postal code: 738 01
- Website: www.frydekmistek.cz

Frýdek-Místek (Czech pronunciation: [ˈfriːdɛk ˈmiːstɛk], Polish: Frydek-Mistek; German: Friede(c)k-Mistek) is a city in the Moravian-Silesian Region of the Czech Republic. It has about 53,000 inhabitants. It is located in the Moravian-Silesian Foothills, at the confluence of the Ostravice and Morávka rivers.

Frýdek-Místek is an administratively united pair of towns. Frýdek is located in the historical region of Czech Silesia, while Místek is in Moravia, and they are divided by the Ostravice River. They were two separate towns until the merger in 1943.

The historic centres of both Frýdek and Místek are well preserved and are protected as two urban monument zones. The most important historical landmark is a pilgrimage site with the Basilica of the Visitation of Our Lady, which is protected as a national cultural monument.

== Administrative division ==
Frýdek-Místek consists of seven municipal parts (in brackets population according to the 2021 census):

- Frýdek (28,200)
- Místek (20,981)
- Chlebovice (808)
- Lískovec (1,544)
- Lysůvky (331)
- Skalice (1,545)
- Zelinkovice (289)

Skalice forms an exclave of the municipal territory.

== Geography ==
Frýdek-Místek is located about 14 kilometres (9 mi) south of Ostrava. It is situated on the border of two historical regions. Místek lies in Moravia, while Frýdek lies in Czech Silesia, and the Ostravice River forms the border between them. The city is situated relatively close the borders of Poland (20 km or 12 mi) and Slovakia (25 km or 16 mi).

Frýdek-Místek is located at the confluence of the Ostravice and Morávka rivers. The city lies mostly in the Moravian-Silesian Foothills, but a small part in the north also extends into the Ostrava Basin. The highest point of Frýdek-Místek is the hill Ostružná at 616 m (2,021 ft) above sea level, located in the southwestern tip of the municipal territory.

== History ==
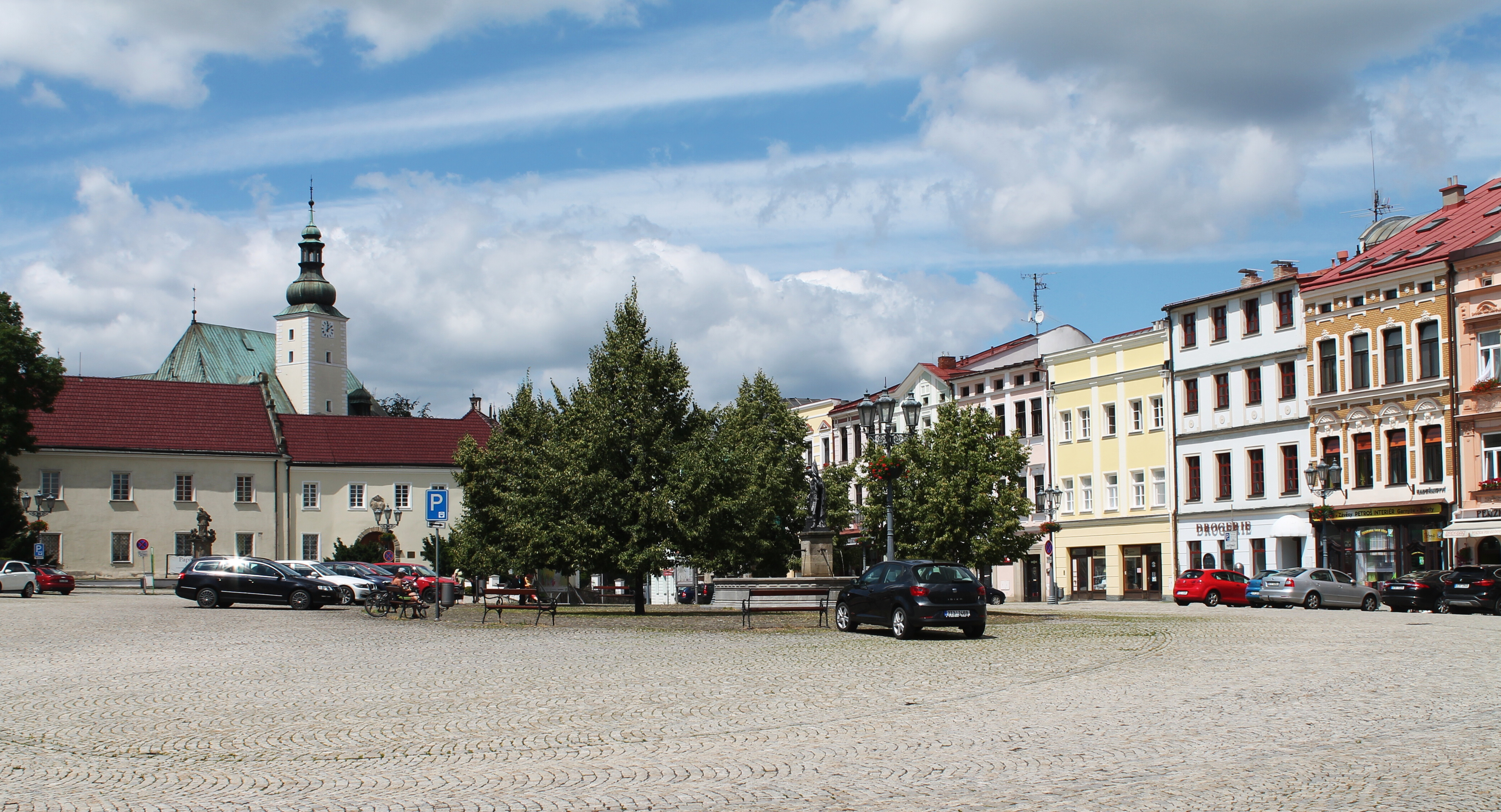
Zámecké náměstí in Frýdek

The first written mention of Frýdek (as Friedberg) is from 1267, when it appeared in the will of bishop Bruno von Schauenburg. It was later renamed Místek, and a new village called Frýdek was founded nearby, probably between 1327 and 1335. In the 16th century, Frýdek and Místek were parts of the Frýdek-Místek estate. The then owner, bishop Stanislav Pavlovský, decided to split the estate and sell Frýdek in 1584, and merged Místek with the Hukvaldy estate. Místek remained part of it until 1850.

The history of both towns includes devastating fires, plague epidemics and war damage. In the 19th century, several textile factories were established in both Frýdek and Místek, and in 1833 an ironworks was established in Lískovec. Industry caused the economic prosperity of both towns, new houses and public buildings were built.

Místek was one of the few places in former Czechoslovakia where the Czech army offered military resistance to the German invaders. An armed engagement took place here on 14 March 1939.

On 1 January 1943, the Germans joined the previously separate towns of Frýdek and Místek into a single town called Frýdek. In 1955, the town was renamed to its current name. In 2006, Frýdek-Místek became a statutory city.

== Demographics ==
Historical population

Year	Pop.	±%
1869	13,617	—
1880	14,989	+10.1%
1890	17,413	+16.2%
1900	20,902	+20.0%
1910	22,914	+9.6%

Year	Pop.	±%
1921	22,473	−1.9%
1930	26,379	+17.4%
1950	27,002	+2.4%
1961	31,364	+16.2%
1970	42,608	+35.9%

Year	Pop.	±%
1980	55,191	+29.5%
1991	63,808	+15.6%
2001	61,400	−3.8%
2011	56,356	−8.2%
2021	53,698	−4.7%

Source: Censuses

== Economy ==
In Frýdek-Místek several conglomerates have its factories, including Korean Hanwha Group, the Dutch company Huisman - producer of lifting equipment, and the Belgian Vyncke, which designs and builds green and clean energy plants.

The food processing industry has a long tradition in the city, led by brands such as Marlenka International (manufacturer of cakes and desserts) or Chodura – Beskydské uzeniny (meat products).

== Transport ==
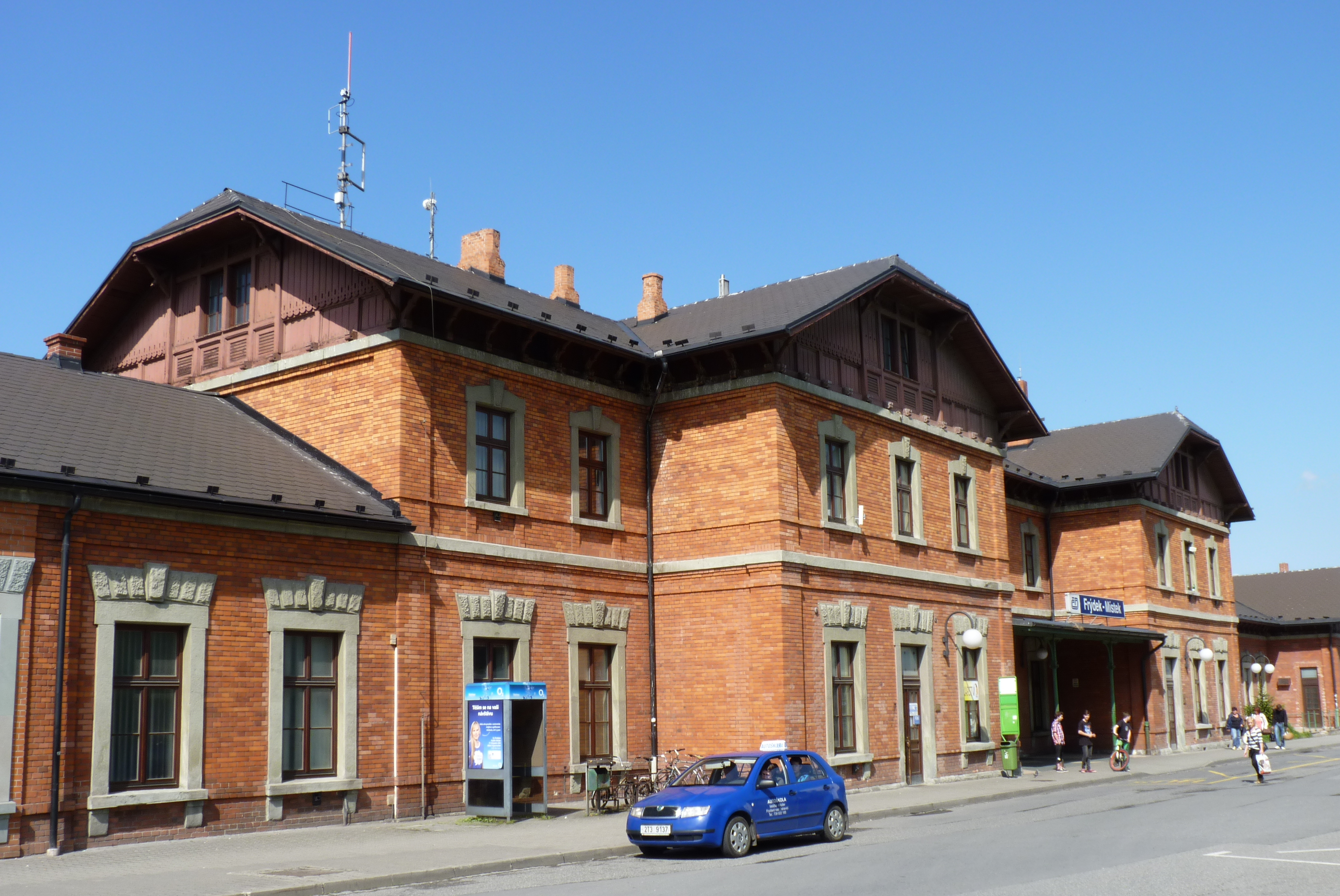
Train station

The D48 motorway (part of the European route E462), which connects the D1 motorway with the Czech–Polish border in Český Těšín, runs through Frýdek-Místek. The D56 motorway splits from it and connects Frýdek-Místek with Ostrava. The I/56 road runs from Frýdek-Místek to the Czech–Slovak border.

Frýdek-Místek is located on the railway lines Ostrava–Frenštát pod Radhoštěm and Frýdek-Místek–Český Těšín.

== Culture ==
The city has a tradition of choral singing, represented by several choirs. Ensembles such as the Frýdek-Místek Symphony Orchestra, the Frýdek-Místek Brass Orchestra, the Ostravica Folk Song and Dance Ensemble and the Ostravička Children's Folklore Ensemble perform concert activities.

The annual cultural events organised by the city are the International Folklore Festival and the Festival of Twin Towns.

== Sport ==
The local ice hockey club is HC Frýdek-Místek. The town hosted also the 1988 IIHF European U18 Championship, 1991 IIHF European Women Championships, and the 1994 World Junior Ice Hockey Championships.

The local association football team is FK Frýdek-Místek.

== Sights ==
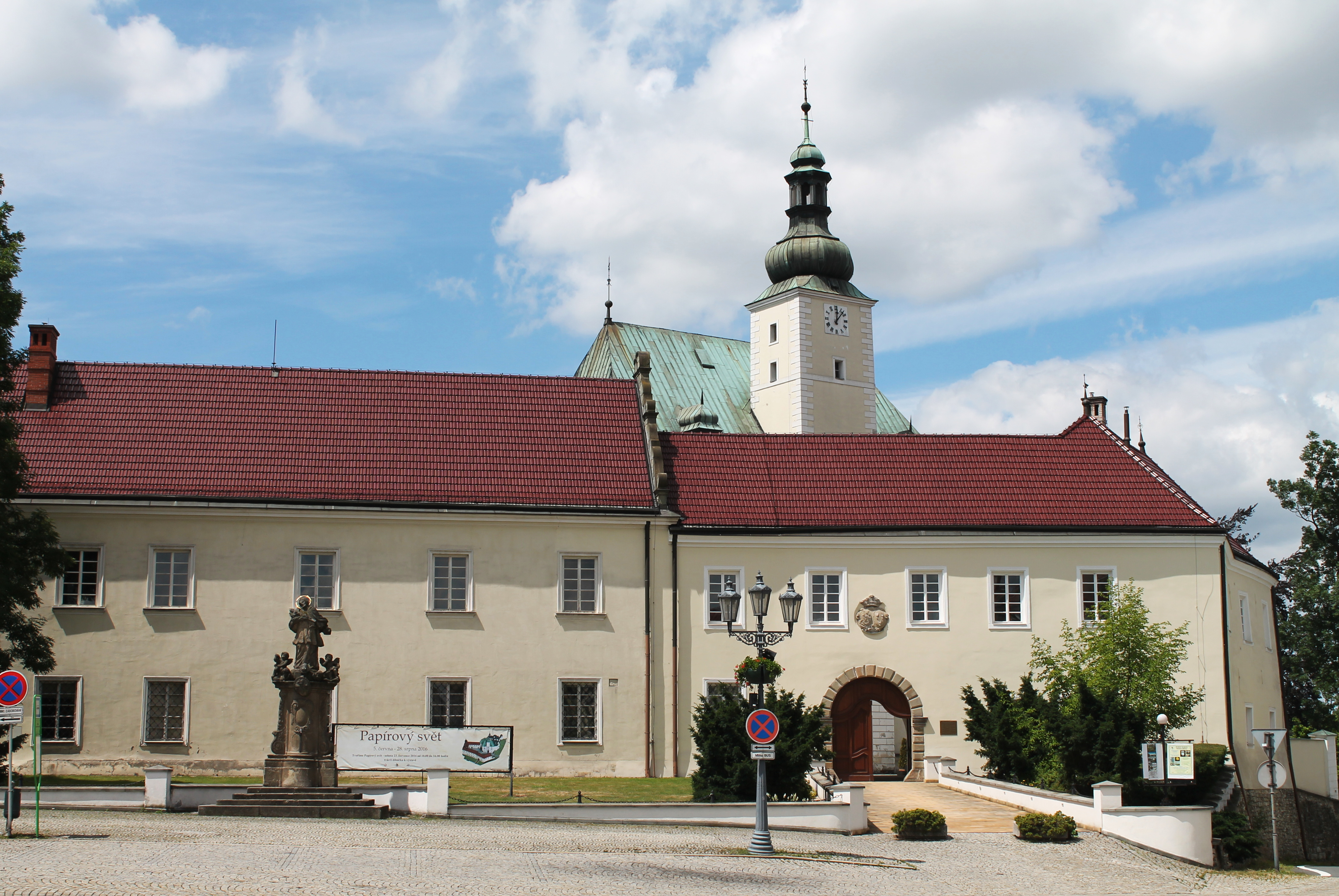
Frýdek Castle as seen from the town square

The historic centre of Frýdek is located around the square Zámecké náměstí with valuable, originally Renaissance houses. By the square is located the Frýdek Castle, originally built in the Gothic style between 1327 and 1339. It was rebuilt in the Renaissance style at the turn of the 16th and 17th centuries. Today the castle houses the Museum of Moravian-Silesian Beskids. Part of the castle is an English-style castle park.

A part of the historic centre of Frýdek is the Church of Saint Judoc. It was built probably in 1612 and at the time of its foundation it was behind the town walls. The Renaissance church is an example of semi-folk architecture.

In Frýdek is located the Basilica of the Visitation of Our Lady. The church was built in 1740–1777 and replaced a wooden chapel, which was a pilgrimage site due to the allegedly miraculous statue of the Virgin Mary. The statue was moved into the new church. In 1999, the church was promoted by Pope John Paul II to a minor basilica. Since 2018, it has been protected as a national cultural monument.

The historic centre of Místek is formed by the square Náměstí Svobody, lined with preserved burgher houses with arcades. Near the square is located the Church of Saint James the Great from 1622–1644. It replaced a wooden church consecrated to Saint Nicholas, which was first mentioned in 1582 and was destroyed by fire in 1602. The tower of the church is a landmark of Místek.

== Notable people ==
- Viktor Uhlig (1857–1911), Austrian geologist and paleontologist
- Petr Bezruč (1867–1958), poet; lived and worked here in 1891–1893
- Benno Landsberger (1890–1968), German assyriologist
- Óndra Łysohorsky (1905–1989), poet
- Miloš Macourek (1926–2002), poet and screenwriter
- František Valošek (born 1937), footballer
- Josef Mikoláš (1938–2015), ice hockey player
- Dan Gawrecki (born 1943), historian
- Jan Keller (born 1955), politician
- Zdeněk Nytra (born 1961), politician
- Martin Říman (born 1961), politician
- Ivana Chýlková (born 1963), actress
- Petr Velička (born 1967), chess player
- Tomáš Galásek (born 1973), footballer
- David Stypka (1979–2021), singer
- Ondřej Palát (born 1991), ice hockey player
- Leoš Petrovský (born 1993), handball player

== Twin towns – sister cities ==
Frýdek-Místek is twinned with:

- Bielsko-Biała, Poland
- Harelbeke, Belgium
- Mysłowice, Poland
- Žilina, Slovakia
- Żywiec County, Poland

== Gallery ==
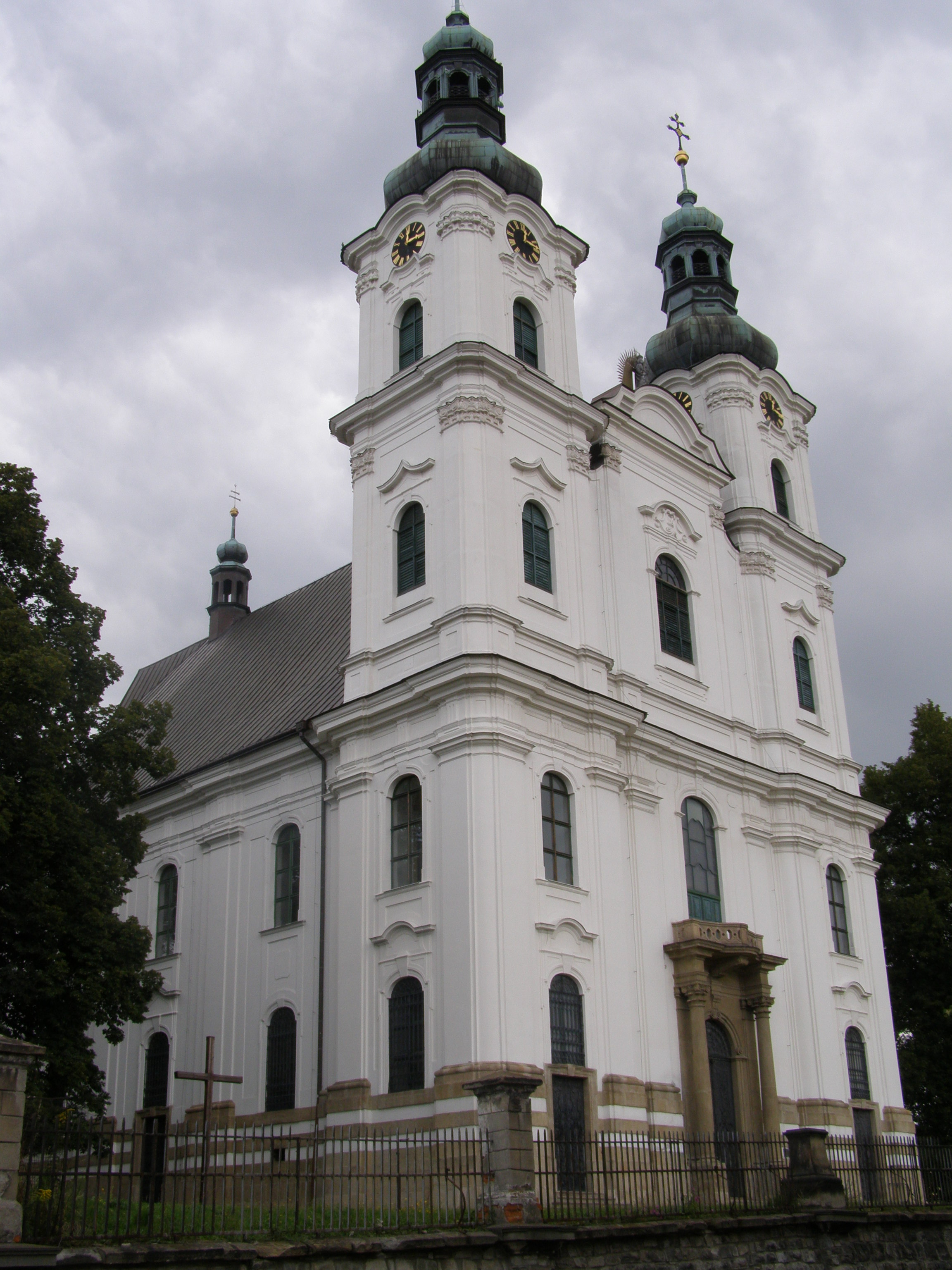
Basilica of the Visitation of Our Lady

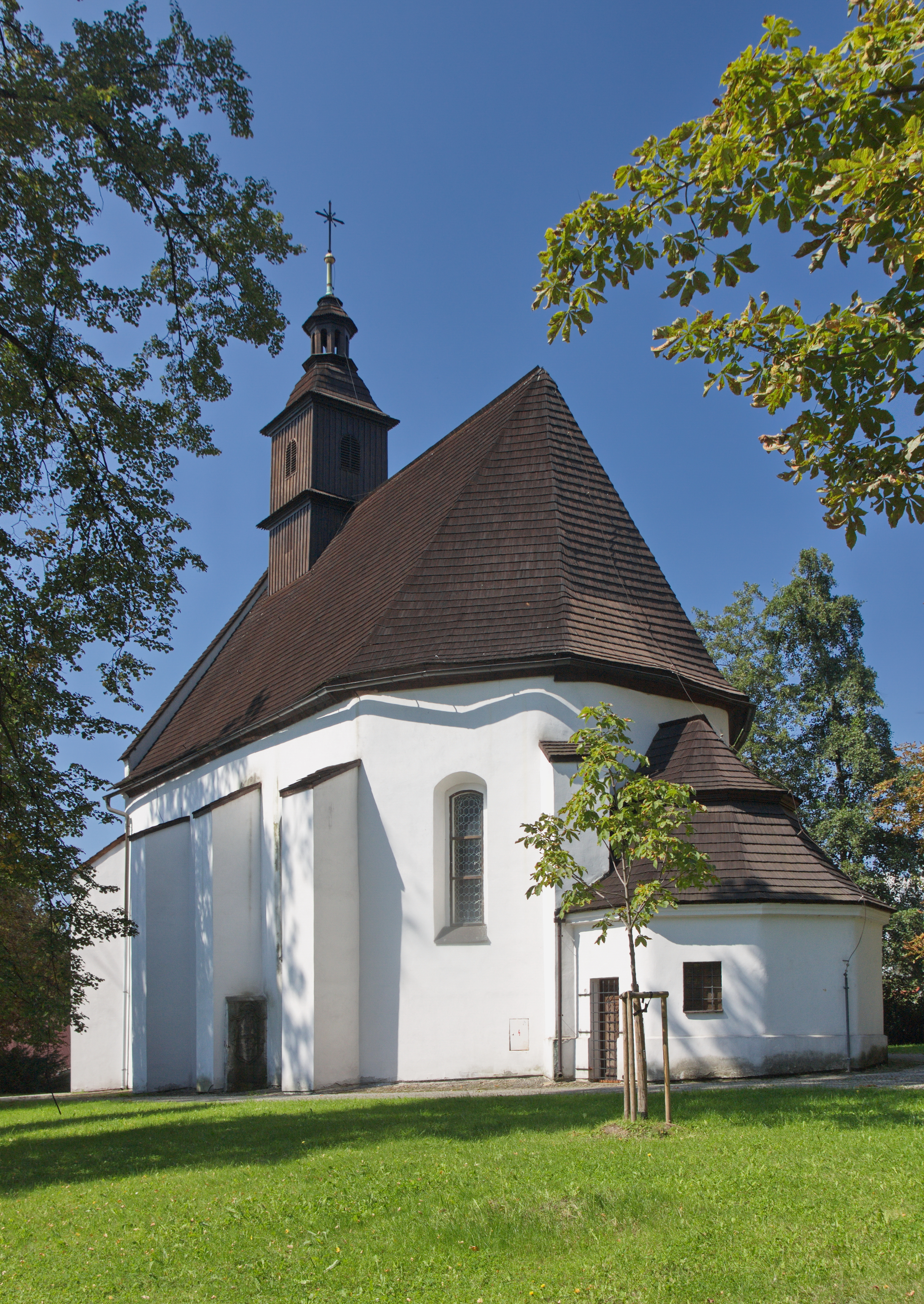
Church of Saint Judoc

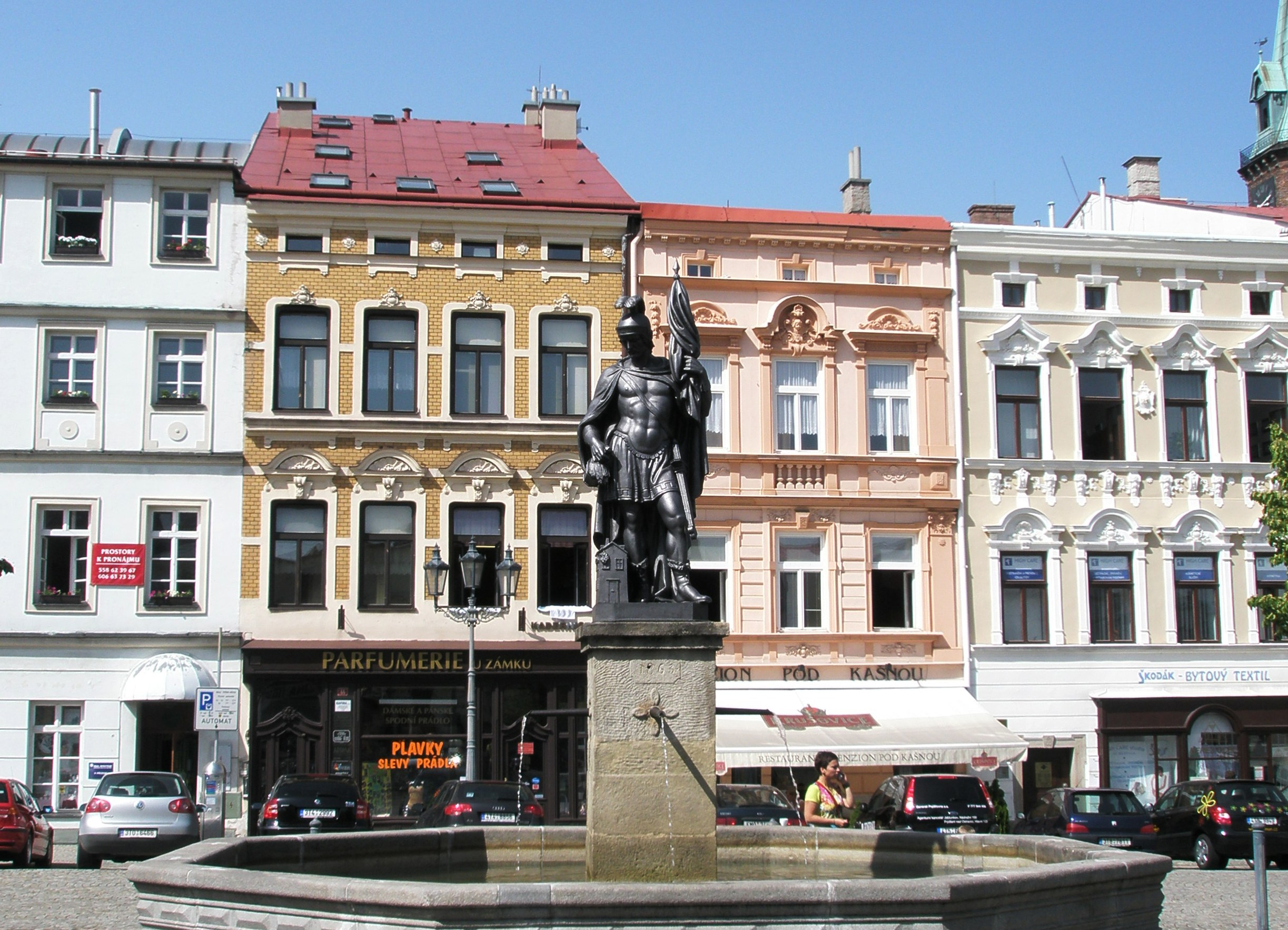
A statue of Saint Florian on the Zámecké náměstí

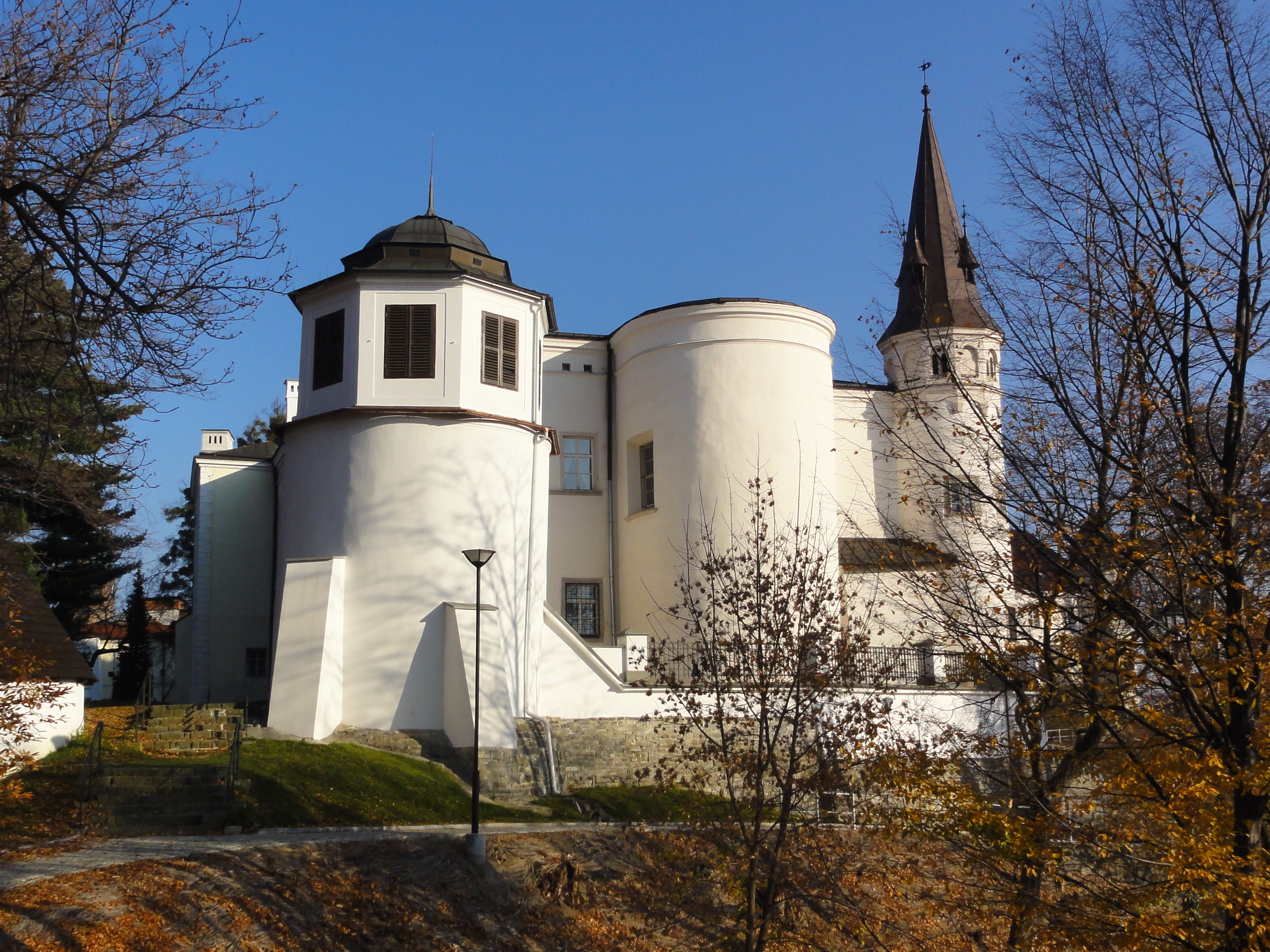
Frýdek Castle

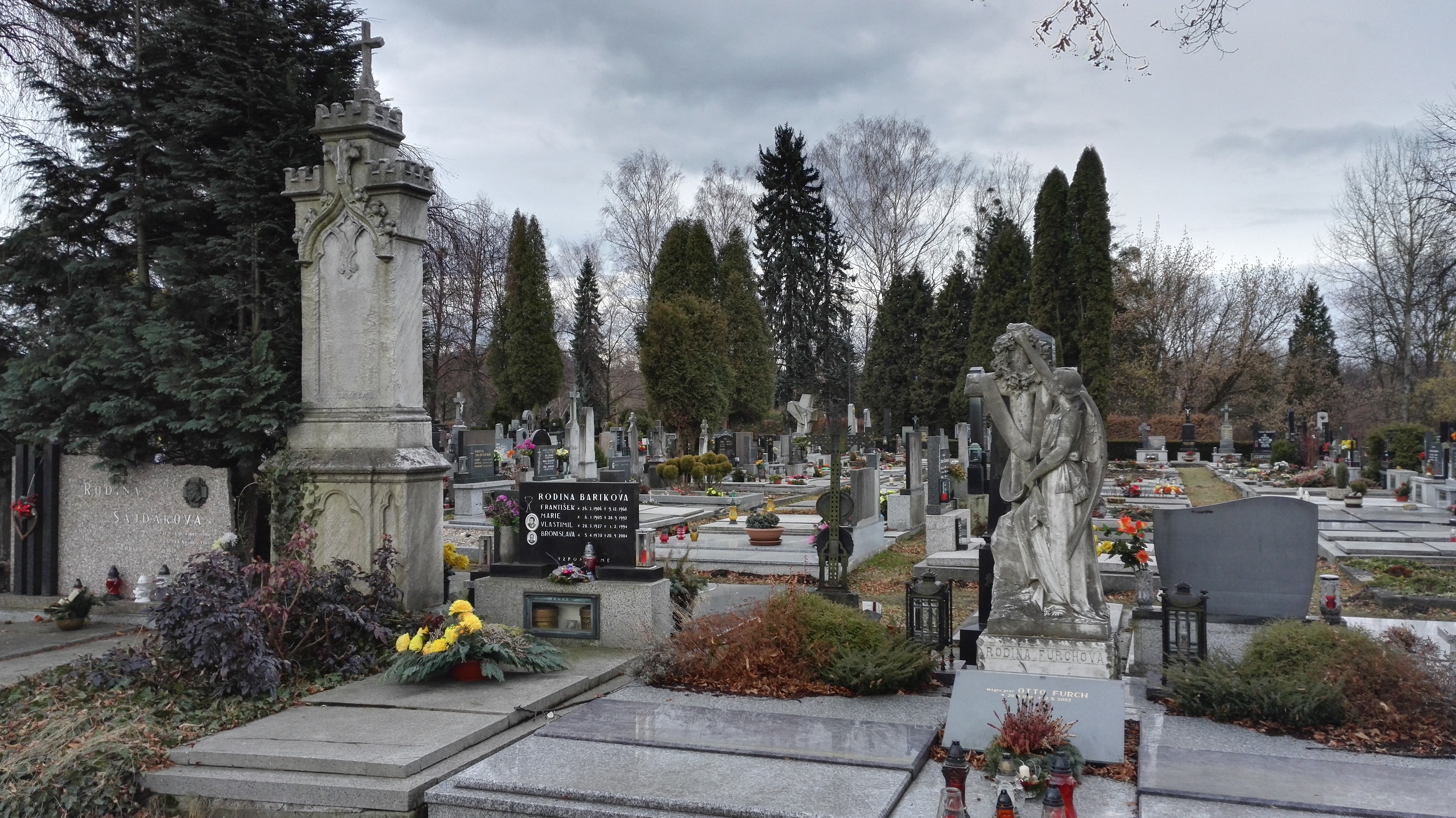
Central cemetery in Frýdek

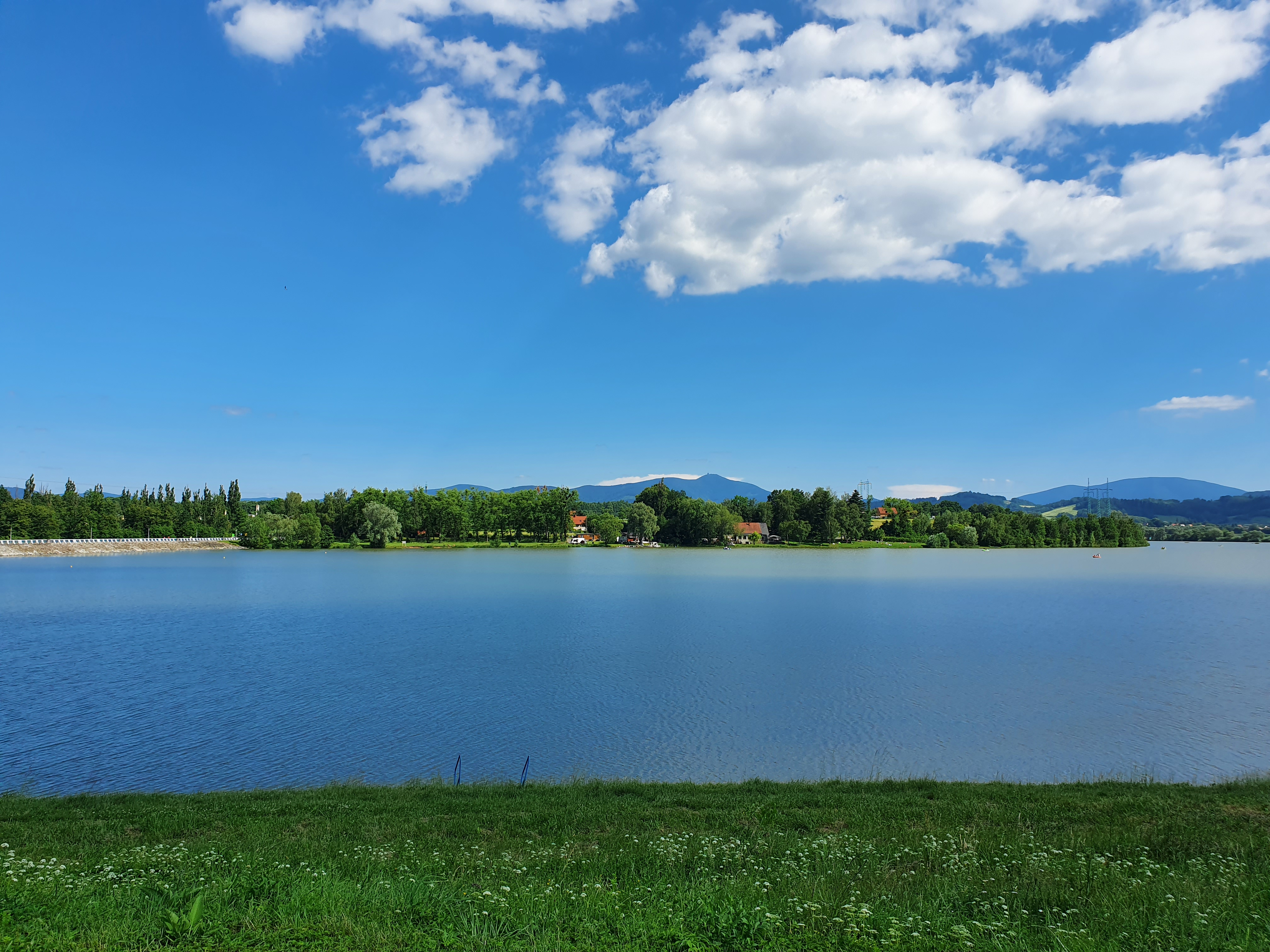
Olešná Reservoir
