= Velička =

Velička may refer to:

- Velička (river), a river in the Czech Republic
- Velička (surname)
