= Vyncke (surname) =

Vyncke is a surname. Notable people with the surname include:

- Camiel Vyncke (born 1940), Belgian racing cyclist
- François Vyncke (1892–?), Belgian long-distance runner
- Peter Vyncke (born 1971), Belgian entrepreneur
