= Forbes Marshall =

Indian engineering company

- Company type: Private Limited
- Industry: Steam engineering and control instrumentation
- Founded: 1926; 100 years ago in Gujarat, India
- Founder: J. N. Marshall, Darius Forbes
- Headquarters: Pune, Maharashtra, India
- Key people: Farhad Forbes (co-chairman), Naushad Forbes (co-chairman)
- Products: Boilers and boiler efficiency systems, steam systems, process analysers, distributed control systems (DCS), compressed air efficiency products, emission monitoring products, control valves, flowmeters, vibration monitoring systems, automation
- Services: Energy audits, plant asset management, compressed air audits, vibration consultancy services, design consultancy
- Subsidiaries: Codel International, UK
- Website: www.forbesmarshall.com

Forbes Marshall is a multinational engineering company. It specializes in and manufactures steam engineering and control instrumentation products.

== History ==
Forbes Marshall (now, Forbes Marshall Group) was originated as a trading company. It was set up by J N Marshall in 1926. It started supplying textile accessories to the textile industry in Ahmedabad, Gujarat, India. It started distribution of steam engineering products in 1946. The first factory for the manufacture of steam products was set up in Kasarwadi, Pune in 1958. In 1962 the company entered the control instrumentation business.

In the 1980s, the company established into two joint ventures - Forbes Marshall Arca (erstwhile Arca Controls), in partnership with Arca Regler, Germany and Krohne Marshall. a joint venture with Krohne Messtechnik, Germany. In 2006, Krohne Marshall set up Asia's largest flowmeter calibration facility. In the early 2000s Forbes Marshall entered into a joint venture with Codel International, UK. Codel is now a Forbes Marshall company. Forbes Vyncke, a joint venture company for manufacture of biomass boilers was formed with Vyncke, Belgium in 2009.

The company set up a new manufacturing plant at Chakan, Pune in 2013.

== Manufacturing ==
The award-winning state-of-the-art manufacturing facility at Chakan near Pune, is spread over 50 acres of land and was designed by Christopher Charles Benninger Architects. The campus has dedicated assembly and test rigs for hydro, seat leak and performance testing to ensure high quality systems.

Flow meters and control valves are manufactured at the Forbes Marshall facilities in Pimpri, Pune. The facility also boasts of a sophisticated calibration rig with the capability to calibrate flowmeters of up to 2000 mm. This NABL accredited rig is the second largest in Asia.

== Products and services ==
- Boilers and boiler efficiency
- Steam systems
- Valves
- Flow and level meters
- Condition monitoring systems
- Automation
- Steam and water analysis systems
- Process analytics
- Emission quality analyzers
- Gauges
- Compressed air efficiency
- Services
- Energy audits
- Plant asset management
- Compressed air audits
- Vibration consultancy services
- Design consultancy

== Industry academia connect ==
Forbes Marshall has partnered with various educational institutions for collaborative training programmes. They have also sponsored projects and training rigs to expose students to practical engineering. The company works closely with several engineering colleges in developing their curriculum and senior members of the company also serve as guest lecturers.

Every year Forbes Marshall conducts a three-day Teacher's Training Programme for faculty of Engineering Colleges.

In 2013, Forbes Marshall Forbes launched its Technology Centre at the IIT Madras Research Park.

Forbes Marshall launched its Energy Efficiency Centre at IIT Bombay in 2016.

Forbes Marshall and University of Peradeniya, Sri Lanka set up a Steam Engineering Centre.

== Corporate social responsibility ==
Forbes Marshall has been known for their social initiatives that broadly focuses on health, education and empowerment. The social initiatives of the organization have been mainly spread in the communities surrounding their factories. Forbes Marshall hosts a full-fledged activity center on its premises along with a play school. The activity centre hosts varied classes for school dropouts, underprivileged children, training for women's groups and meetings.

=== Forbes Healthcare Foundation ===
The Shehernaz Medicare Centre, located on the Forbes Marshall Kasarwadi campus is a full-fledged 25 bed hospital run under the aegis of the Forbes Healthcare Foundation. Free medical aid is provided to the employees and communities from the surrounding areas.

=== Forbes Marshall Foundation ===
Forbes Marshall has set up a Foundation with the objective of supporting projects and communities, located outside of Pune, India. The focus is on supporting sustainable and collaborative projects and initiatives in the state of Maharashtra, with the objective of enhancing impact.
