= Velička (surname) =

Velička (Czech and Slovak feminine: Veličková) is a Lithuanian, Czech and Slovak surname. Notable people with the surname include:

- Andrius Velička (born 1979), Lithuanian football player
- Arnas Velička (born 1999), Lithuanian basketball player
- Martina Veličková (born 1967), Slovak ice hockey player
- Petr Velička (born 1967), Czech chess grandmaster

== See also ==
- Velicka (footballer) (born 1986), Brazilian footballer
