= Peter Vyncke =

Belgian entrepreneur and Co-CEO of the Vyncke company

Peter Vyncke (born January 12, 1971) is a Belgian entrepreneur. He was born in Kortrijk as the son of Dirk and Daisy Vyncke, the oldest of four siblings, and was raised in Harelbeke. Vyncke graduated from KU Leuven University in 1994 with a degree in applied economics.

== Career ==
Between 1996 and 2000 Vyncke led the Asian branch of the family business Vyncke in Kuala Lumpur, Malaysia. Since 2002, Peter and Dieter Vyncke are Co-CEO of Vyncke. Since then, the company expanded internationally. In 2020 he moved to Singapore.

== Awards and membership ==
In 2007, at age 36, Peter was elected as JCI’s Young Flemisch entrepreneur. He is a member of iGMO. Being a member of the management team of Voka, he was nominated as manager of the year in 2015 and 2016. Peter and Dieter Vyncke were nominated Honorary citizen of Harelbeke in 2016. Vyncke is a Flemish nationalist.
