= Viktor Uhlig =

Austrian geologist (1857–1911)

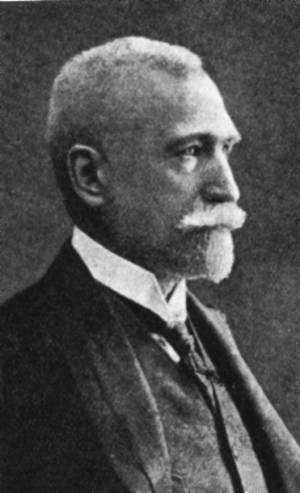
- Born: 2 January 1857; Frýdek-Místek, Austria-Hungary
- Died: 4 June 1911 (aged 54); Karlovy Vary, Austria-Hungary
- Occupation(s): Geologist and paleontologist

Viktor Karl Uhlig (2 January 1857 – 4 June 1911) was an Austrian geologist and paleontologist.

== Biography ==
He studied geology and mineralogy at the universities of Graz and Vienna, receiving his doctorate in 1879. Afterwards he worked as a research assistant under Melchior Neumayr in Vienna, and in 1891 was named an associate professor of geology and mineralogy at the German Polytechnic in Prague. Two years later he became a full professor, and in 1900 returned to Vienna as a professor of geology and paleontology. In 1907 he was a co-founder of the Geologischen Gesellschaft in Wien.

He is best remembered for his geological and tectonic investigations of the Carpathians and for his paleontological work involving ammonites of the Cretaceous period.

== Published works ==
- Die Cephalopodenfauna der Wernsdorfer Schichten, 1883 – Cephalopod fauna of the Wernsdorf stratification.
- Ueber das Vorkommen und die Entstehung des Erdöls, 1884 – On the occurrence and origin of oil.
- Erdgeschichte, 1886-87 (2 volumes), main author: Melchior Neumayr – History of the Earth.
- Die Geologie des Tatragebirges, 1897 – The geology of the Tatra Mountains.
- Über die Cephalopodenfauna der Teschener und Grodischter Schichten, 1900 – On cephalopod fauna of the Teschen and Grodischt strata.
- Bau und Bild der Karpaten, 1903 – Construction and image of the Carpathians.
- Über die Tektonik der Karpaten, 1907 – On the tectonics of the Carpathians.
- "The Fauna of the Spiti Shales", in: Palaeontologia Indica, 1910.
