= Vyncke =

Vyncke NV
- Type: Private
- Industry: Engineering
- Founded: 1912
- Founder: Louis Vyncke
- Headquarters: Harelbeke, Flanders, Belgium
- Number of locations: 8 (2020)
- Area served: Worldwide
- Key people: Peter Vyncke (CEO); Dieter Vyncke (CEO)
- Products: Boilers, steam systems, electricity production equipment
- Services: Green energy
- Number of employees: 350 (2020)
- Parent: Prometheus
- Website: www.vyncke.com

Vyncke NV is a fourth generation Belgian global family business that originated in Flanders. It has over 400 employees in Belgium, Brazil, China, Czech Republic, Germany, Malaysia, Spain, Thailand, and Africa.

The company was founded in 1912 by Louis Vyncke to design and build steam energy plants to burn biomass and waste into thermal energy and electrical power. The energy is delivered as a combination of steam, hot water, thermal oil, hot gas, or electricity, depending on the industrial process.

== Origin ==
In 1912, Louis Vyncke settled as a blacksmith in Gullegem. He invested in a workshop, but in 1914 he had to serve the army during World War I. In his absence, his wife Flavie was left with 2 children. In 1915, Vyncke's workshop burned down. After the war, Louis Vyncke acquired more skills and earnings as an employee in France. By the 1920s, the flax industry in Flanders was flourishing. There was a rising demand for steam boilers to extract flax fibres with hot water. Louis Vyncke used his blacksmith skills to build riveted boilers in a new workshop at the Moorseelse Kassei in Gullegem. Flax was readily available at the time and could easily be transported. The fibres were used in the textile industry and the leftover straw waste was burned in the boilers.

After World War II, flax waste became the raw material for fiberboard production, which attracted new customers and industries. The company expanded rapidly and in 1956, sons Michel and René moved to a new office and factory in Harelbeke (current headquarters).

Michel Vyncke expanded the boiler manufacturing business across West Flanders and the North of France. When Michel died in 1972, the youngest son Dirk Vyncke continued to lead the family company.

The 1973 oil crisis presented an opportunity for Dirk Vyncke to convert the company into a global player, to turn biomass and waste into green and clean energy. In 1992, the enterprise became an NV.

In 2021 Stefaan Lauwers became the CEO of Vyncke NV, with both Peter and Dieter Vyncke deciding to focus on the holding company.

== Current activities ==
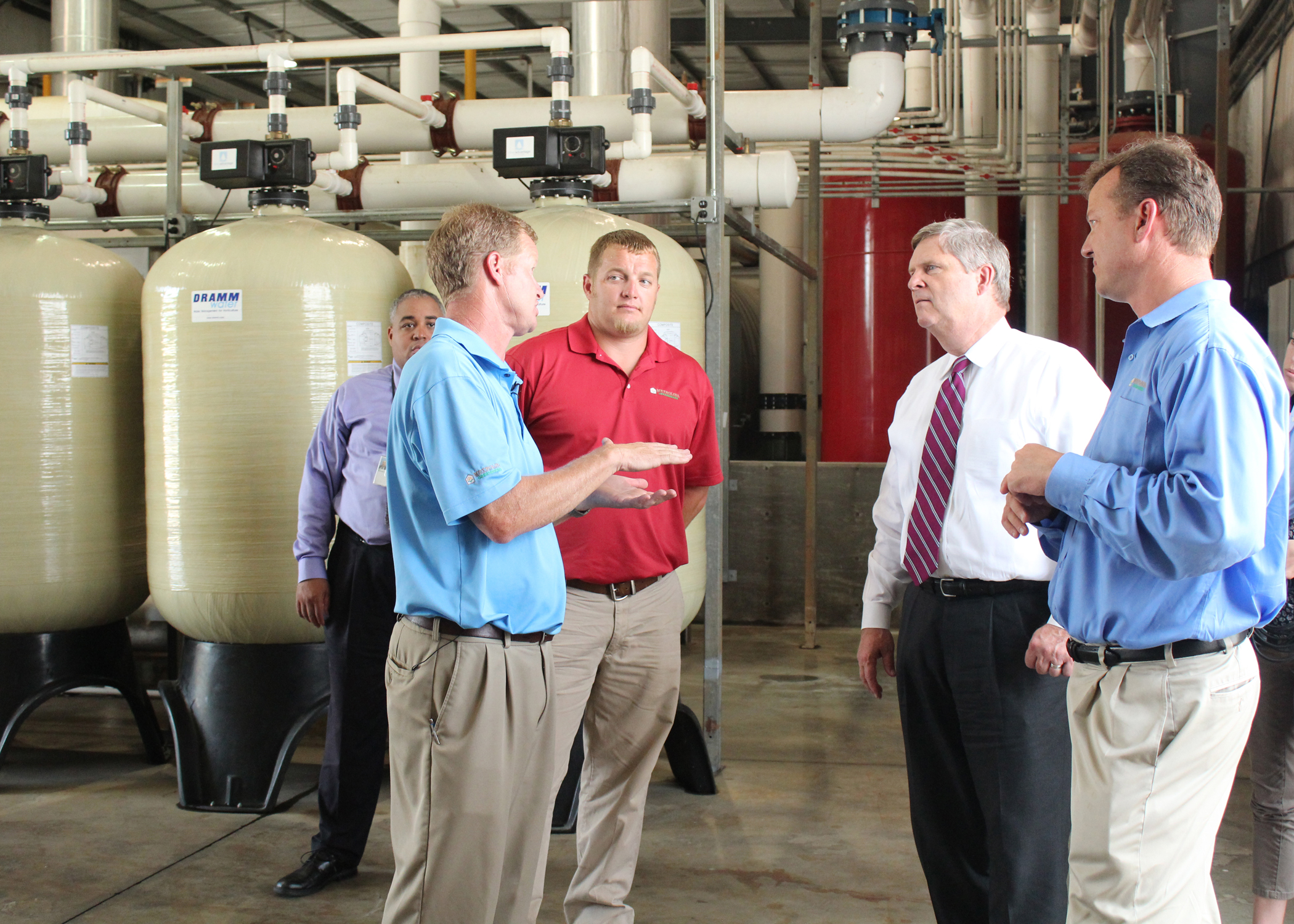
5 micron boiler at Metrolina Greenhouses in Huntersville

The supervisory board consists of Jürgen Ingels, Lieven Danneels and Els Verbraecken.

Vyncke's activities range across three market segments: food and agriculture, wood, and recovered fuels. Its international business is distributed amongst Belgium (3%), Europe (45%), and outside EU (52%) with a strong presence in South America and Asia.

Vyncke participates in several international joint ventures: PetroBio, Forbes Vyncke, Callens Vyncke, Trasmec, and Panel Alliance; all serving in the energy and the processing industry. In 2016, Vyncke was awarded the Enterprise of the year title by the consultancy firm EY in collaboration with the business newspaper De Tijd and the bank BNP Paribas Fortis.

In 2025, Vyncke published its Global Activity Report 2024–2025, featuring the comic “The Fierce Firemakers”, part of the Suske and Wiske series.
