= Petr Velička =

Czech chess player

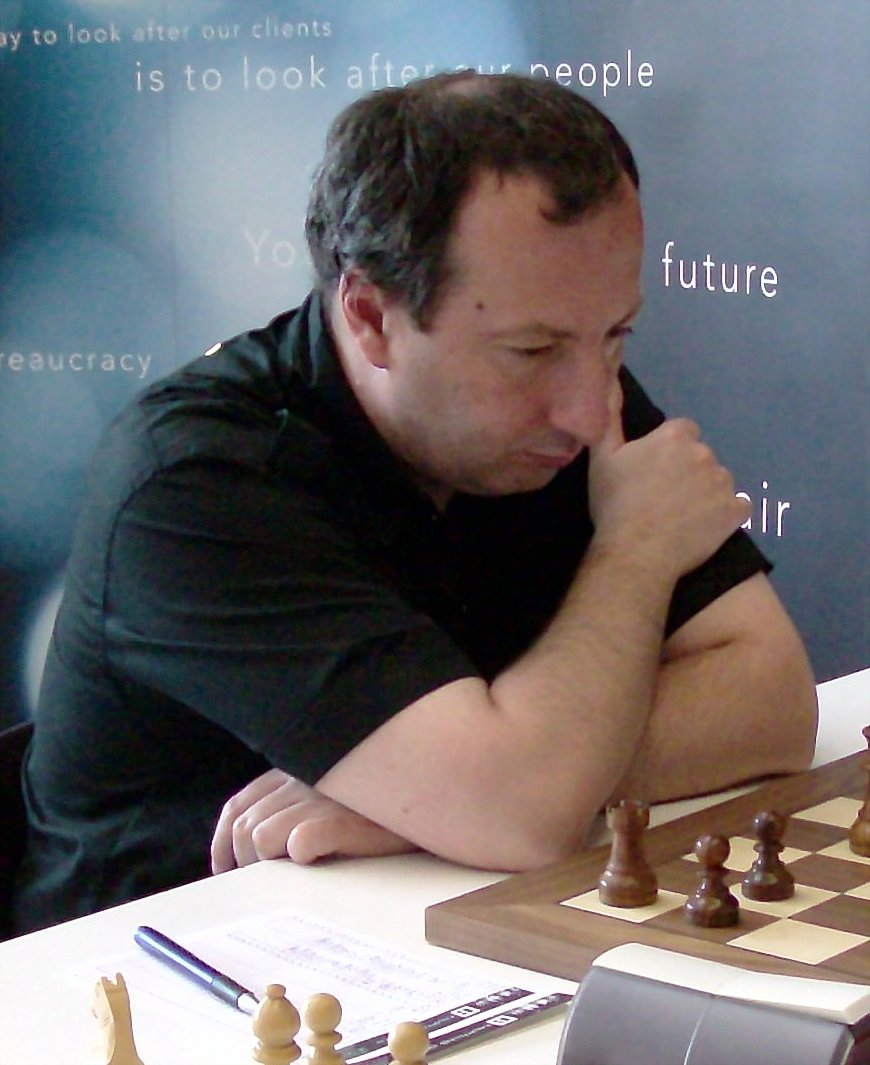
- Velička in 2008

Personal information
- Born: February 26, 1967 (age 59) Frýdek-Místek

Chess career
- Country: Czech Republic
- Title: Grandmaster (2007)
- Peak rating: 2519 (October 2007)

Petr Velička (born 26 February 1967 in Frýdek-Místek) is a Czech chess grandmaster.

He was awarded the GM title in 2007. His best placing in the Czech Chess Championship was a second place in 1999 in Lázně Bohdaneč.
