= No. 73 grenade =

No. 73
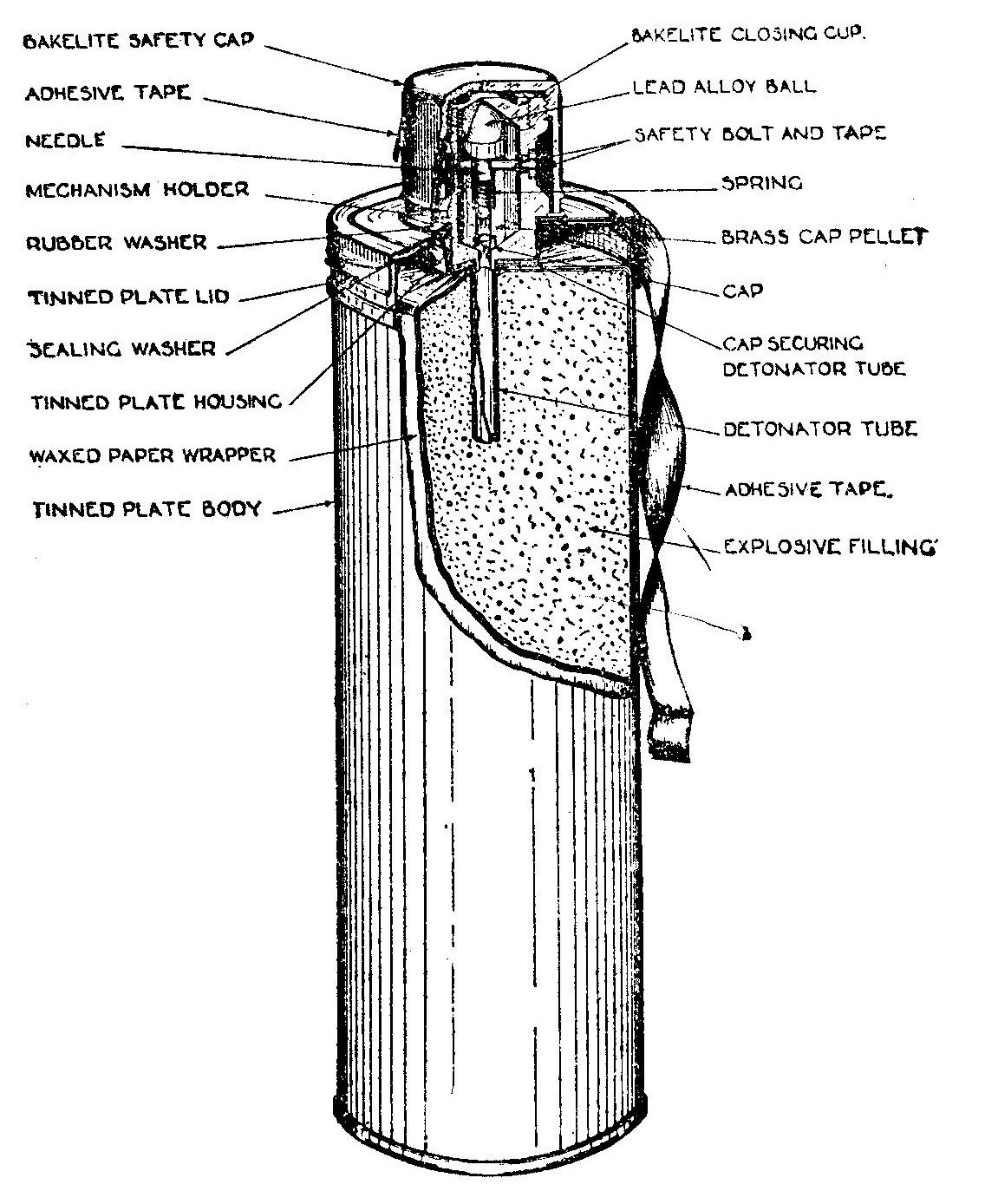
- Hand percussion grenade (anti-tank No. 73 Mark I)
- Type: Anti-tank grenade
- Place of origin: United Kingdom

Service history
- In service: 1940–1941; 1943–?1945
- Used by: United Kingdom
- Wars: Second World War

Specifications
- Mass: 4.5 pounds (2.0 kg)
- Length: 11 inches (280 mm)
- Diameter: 3.5 inches (89 mm)
- Filling: Polar ammonal gelatine dynamite or nitrogelatine
- Filling weight: 3.5 pounds (1.6 kg)
- Detonation mechanism: Impact

The No. 73 grenade, also known as the "Thermos", "Woolworth bomb", or "hand percussion grenade", was a British anti-tank grenade used during the Second World War. It got its nickname from the resemblance to a Thermos flask.

== Development ==
With the end of the Battle of France and the evacuation of the British Expeditionary Force from the port of Dunkirk between 26 May and 4 June 1940, a German invasion of Great Britain seemed likely. The British Army was not well-equipped to defend the country in such an event; in the weeks after the Dunkirk evacuation it could only field twenty-seven divisions. The Army was particularly short of anti-tank guns, 840 of which had been left behind in France leaving only 167 available in Britain; ammunition was so scarce for the remaining guns that regulations forbade any being used for training purposes.

As a result of these shortcomings, new anti-tank weapons had to be developed to equip the British Army and the Home Guard with the means to repel German armoured vehicles. Many of these were anti-tank hand grenades, large numbers of which could be built in a very short space of time and for a low cost. They included the grenade, hand, anti-tank No. 74, also known as the "sticky bomb", which was coated with a strong adhesive and stuck to a vehicle, and the No. 76 special incendiary grenade, essentially a simple white phosphorus incendiary contained in a breakable glass container, like a more sophisticated variation of the Molotov cocktail (which simply uses a flammable liquid such as gasoline and a burning rag as a "fuse"). Ian Hogg states that the simplest of these grenades was the No. 73 grenade.

== Design ==
The No. 73 grenade had a roughly cylindrical shape and plastic screw-on cap, similar to that of a Thermos flask, from which the "Thermos bomb" nickname was derived. It was approximately 3.5 inches (89 mm) in diameter and 11 inches (280 mm) in length, and weighed 4.5 pounds (2.0 kg). Its explosive content consisted of 3.5 pounds (1.6 kg) of polar ammonal gelatine dynamite or nitrogelatine – both of which were highly flammable and could be detonated by the impact of small-arms fire. When thrown at a tank or other vehicle, a weighted tape held in the users hand unravelled and pulled free a safety pin, which was attached to a Type 247 "all-ways" fuze (the same type used in the Gammon bomb and No. 69 grenade); this armed and then detonated the grenade. Its weight meant that it could only be thrown short distances, limiting its range to between 10 and 15 yards (9 and 14 m), and its detonation could injure the user if they did not find cover before it detonated. It was able to penetrate 2 inches (51 mm) of armour, and "damage severely any light tank." It was best used against the tracks of a tank, which it could easily blow off and force its crew to waste time by stopping and repairing it.

== Operational history ==
The No. 73 grenade was first issued in the last months of 1940, but it was rarely used as an anti-tank grenade; instead the fuze was usually removed and it was used as a demolition charge. It was withdrawn from service within a year, and reissued again in 1943 for the express purpose of being used for demolition work. On 27 May 1942, a modified version of the grenade was used in the assassination of SS-Obergruppenführer Reinhard Heydrich, when paratrooper Jan Kubiš threw it at Heydrich's car in Prague. The bomb used for this purpose had been shortened.

== See also ==
- British anti-invasion preparations of the Second World War
- RPG-40 – soviet anti-tank hand-grenade used during the World War Two
- Blacker Bombard – World War II-era British anti-tank weapon invented by Lt Col Stewart Blacker
- Smith Gun – artillery
- Northover Projector – grenade launcher
- PIAT – rocket-propelled grenade

== Bibliography ==
- Bull, Stephen; Dennis, Peter; Delf, Brian; Chappell, Mike; Windrow, Martin (2004). World War II Infantry Tactics. Osprey Publishing. ISBN 1-84176-663-1.
- Hogg, Ian (1995). Tank Killers: Anti-Tank Warfare by Men and Machines. Pan Macmillan. ISBN 0-330-35316-0.
- Lampe, David (1968). The Last Ditch: Britain's Secret Resistance and the Nazi Invasion Plan. Greenhill Books. ISBN 978-1-85367-730-4.
- Longmate, Norman (1974). The Real Dad's Army: The Story of the Home Guard. Hutchinson Library Services.
- Lowry, Bernard; Taylor, Chris; Boulanger, Vincent (2004). British Home Defences 1940–45. Osprey Publishing. ISBN 1-84176-767-0.
- Mackenzie, S.P. (1995). The Home Guard: A Military and Political History. Oxford University Press. ISBN 0-19-820577-5.
- Rottman, Gordon L.; Noon, Steve; Windrow, Martin (2005). World War II Infantry Anti-Tank Tactics. Osprey Publishing. ISBN 1-84176-842-1.
- Rottman, Gordon L.; Dennis, Peter (2008). World War II Infantry Assault Tactics. Osprey Publishing. ISBN 978-1-84603-191-5.
- The Hand Percussion Grenade (Anti-tank No. 73, Mark I). Tank Hunting and Destruction, Military Training Manual No 42, Appendix D. War Office. February 1941.
