= No. 76 special incendiary grenade =

No. 76, self-igniting phosphorus
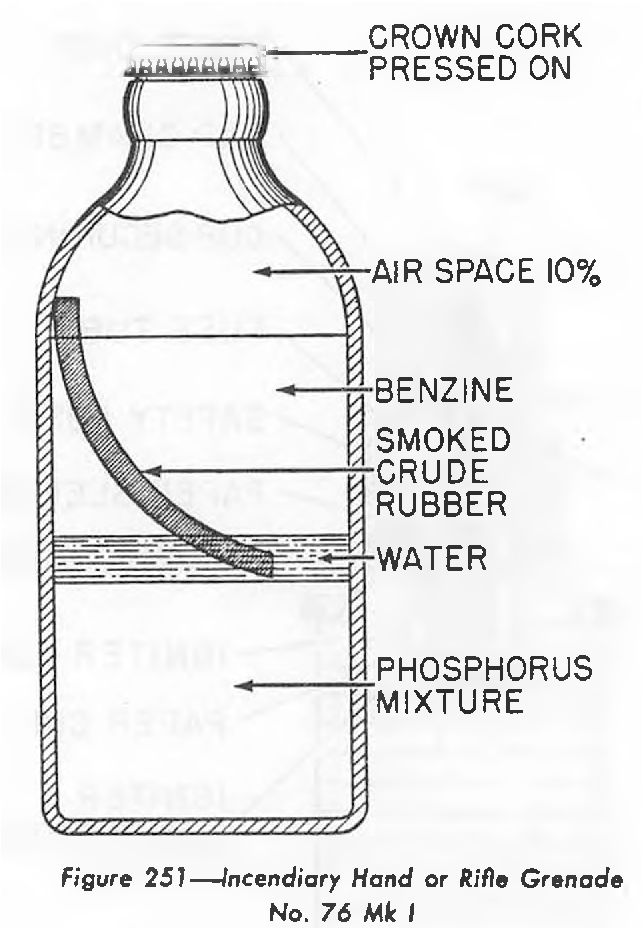
- Type: Incendiary grenade
- Place of origin: United Kingdom

Production history
- No. built: 6,000,000

Specifications
- Filling: phosphorus, benzene
- Detonation mechanism: Impact

The No. 76 special incendiary grenade also commonly known as the A.W. bomb (Albright and Wilson bomb) and SIP grenade (self-igniting phosphorus grenade), was an incendiary grenade based on white phosphorus used during World War II.

On 29 July 1940, manufacturers Albright and Wilson of Oldbury demonstrated to the Royal Air Force how their white phosphorus could be used to ignite incendiary bombs. The demonstration involved throwing glass bottles containing a mixture of petrol and phosphorus at pieces of wood and into a hut. Upon breaking, the phosphorus was exposed to the air and spontaneously ignited; the petrol also burned, resulting in a fierce fire. Because of safety concerns, the RAF was not interested in white phosphorus as a source of ignition, but the idea of a self-igniting petrol bomb took hold. Initially known as an "A.W. bomb" (for the manufacturers, Albright and Wilson), it was officially named the "No. 76 grenade", but was more commonly known as the "SIP" (self-igniting phosphorus) grenade. The perfected list of ingredients was white phosphorus, benzene, water, and a two-inch strip of raw rubber, all in a half-pint bottle sealed with a crown stopper. Over time, the rubber would slowly dissolve, making the contents slightly sticky, and the mixture would separate into two layers; this was intentional, and the grenade was not to be shaken to mix the layers, as this would only delay ignition. When thrown against a hard surface, the glass would shatter and the contents would instantly ignite, liberating choking fumes of phosphorus pentoxide and sulphur dioxide, as well as producing a great deal of heat.

Strict instructions were issued to store the grenades safely, preferably underwater and certainly never in a house. Mainly issued to the Home Guard as an anti-tank weapon, it was produced in vast numbers; by August 1941 well over 6,000,000 had been manufactured. The grenade could either be thrown by hand, or fired from the Northover projector, a simple mortar; a stronger container was needed for the latter, and the two types were colour-coded.

There were many who were sceptical about the efficacy of Molotov cocktails and SIP grenades against the more modern German tanks. Weapon designer Stuart Macrae witnessed a trial of the SIP grenade at Farnborough Airfield: "There was some concern that, if the tank drivers could not pull up quickly enough and hop out, they were likely to be frizzled to death, but after looking at the bottles they said they would be happy to take a chance." The drivers were proved right; trials on modern British tanks confirmed that Molotov and SIP grenades caused the occupants of the tanks "no inconvenience whatsoever".

The Home Guard hid caches of these grenades during the war, for use in the event of an invasion. Not all locations were officially recorded and some caches were lost. Occasionally, the caches are discovered by builders digging foundations. In all cases, the grenades are still found to be dangerous, and are typically destroyed via a controlled explosion.

== See also ==
- No 73 Grenade
- Blacker Bombard
- British anti-invasion preparations of World War II
- Operation Outward
- Smith Gun
- Sticky bomb
