= We Know Our Onions =

- Dad's Army episode
- Episode no.: Series 6 Episode 4
- Directed by: David Croft
- Story by: Jimmy Perry and David Croft
- Original air date: 21 November 1973
- Running time: 30 minutes

Episode chronology
← Previous "The Royal Train"	Next → "The Honourable Man"

"We Know Our Onions" is the fourth episode of the sixth series of the British comedy series Dad's Army. It was originally transmitted on 21 November 1973.

== Synopsis ==
The platoon take part in a Home Guard efficiency test. If the men pass with flying colours, they will be graded a 12-star platoon.

== Plot ==
The platoon are examining their new Smith Gun (an artillery piece unique to the Home Guard), which they have to take on a Home Guard efficiency test for the weekend. Wilson is told off by Mainwaring when he complains "do we have to drag that gun about, what an awful fag". Godfrey and his sisters have also made an inappropriate cover for the gun out of a flowery old sofa cover.

They are going to the test in Jones' van, but Walker has been using it to fulfil a blackmarket order for Warden Hodges, the greengrocer, and has half a ton of onions. These cause the platoon (especially Pike) some discomfort on the journey and Hodges is so incensed about the non-delivery of the onions that he follows them.

Before the start of the test, Wilson shares some information from a friend who previously took part in the test, where the test officer will fire a lot of questions at the platoon and then leave the room, whereby someone else comes in disguise and plants a bomb. Jones shows them his rumāl, a thuggee scarf used to throttle a victim from behind. Meanwhile, Hodges and the Verger appear outside one of the windows, and they constantly pester the platoon over the course of the weekend as they attempt to retrieve Hodges' onions.

The test is supervised by Captain Ramsey, a tough, no-nonsense officer who berates the platoon for their shortcomings, particularly Pike, who is crying from his contact with the onions. Ramsey informs them that they will have to pass tests to be awarded stars, 12 being the maximum that can be earned.

The first test requires the platoon to respond to role-playing scenarios. However, it does not go well for them as Wilson is so indifferent to the role-playing that it loses all effect, Jones attempts to throttle Ramsey when his back is turned (because he had told Jones he was going to be a Gestapo officer) and Wilson ruins Mainwaring's test by pointing out that Mainwaring wouldn't have to push anyone out of a declining hot-air balloon as he could wait for it to land on the ground for the excess passenger to step out.

Ramsey gives up, goes out and sends in an NAAFI canteen girl. Remembering Wilson's advice from before, the platoon grab her, knocking over her trolley and pulling her hair, believing it is a wig, to which she responds, "Oh, you're worse than the Regulars!" Told to get rid of the tea urn, Pike throws it through the (closed) window, where it hits Hodges and the Verger, and empties all over the latter.

The next exercise is to get each man over a tall electric fence in half an hour using only equipment provided to them (mostly wooden planks and oil drums). Jones inevitably volunteers to be the first over the fence, and tries to get Walker to catapult him over, but in doing so they break the only decent long length of wood, thus dooming all other attempts to failure. After half an hour the platoon still have not done it, so they plead for more time. They try until midnight, with no success. Ramsey is not impressed the next morning, revealing that he did not award the platoon any stars for the first test and only one star for the second for "perseverance", despite the fact that their constantly setting the alarm off on the fence kept him awake all night.

The final exercise is using the Smith Gun to repel an assault by Ramsey's regular troops. The three pieces of ammunition for the gun lie behind the same type of electrified fence the platoon were meant to have learnt how to scale in the previous test. Meanwhile, Hodges and the Verger have finally got the key to Jones' van from Walker, and they rush off to transfer the onions to Hodges' van. The platoon suddenly realise that they could use the onions instead of the ammunition for the Smith Gun. They rush to Hodges' van with Mainwaring demanding the onions "in the name of the King", but is forced to buy them off Hodges. They rush back to the Smith Gun, load and fire the onions at the advancing troops, who retreat in confusion. Ramsey is impressed and congratulates Mainwaring, saying he has never seen such initiative displayed by a Home Guard unit and awards them 12 stars outright. The platoon are jubilant and they all rush to retrieve the fallen onions.

== Cast ==
- Arthur Lowe as Captain Mainwaring
- John Le Mesurier as Sergeant Wilson
- Clive Dunn as Lance Corporal Jones
- John Laurie as Private Frazer
- James Beck as Private Walker
- Arnold Ridley as Private Godfrey
- Ian Lavender as Private Pike
- Bill Pertwee as ARP Warden Hodges
- Edward Sinclair as The Verger
- Fulton Mackay as Captain Ramsey
- Alex McAvoy as the Sergeant
- Pamela Manson as the NAAFI Girl
- Cy Town as Mess Steward

== Cultural references and trivia ==
1. This episode uses the historically accurate scarcity of onions in 1942. This fictional story echoes a real incident in which an enthusiastic Home Guard unit involved in an exercise repelled the enemy by discharging small green apples from a Northover Projector..
2. This episode was unique, as it involved virtually no interior television studio recording at BBC Television Centre in London, with nearly the entire episode recorded solely on location. Only one short scene between Jones and Hodges, which lasted 45 seconds, was actually filmed in a studio. This was due to a technicians strike at the BBC, which meant this was the only episode of the entire television series to be produced in this way. To get the laughter for the episode, it was played before an invited audience at BBC Television Centre, and their laughter was played in.
3. This episode was one of several tapes used as backup material for when BBC One television services were disrupted, kept at Pebble Mill, Birmingham. On the 20th June 2000, during a power failure at Television Centre, transmission of BBC One was switched to Birmingham and this programme was shown to the South East region and part broadcast as regional news programmes finished broadcasting.
