= Gammon bomb =

Grenade No. 82 "Gammon bomb"
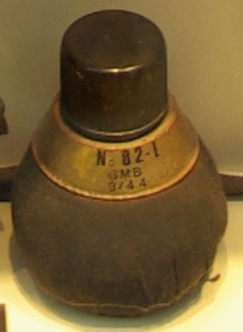
- Gammon Bomb (dated March 1944) shown filled
- Type: Hand grenade
- Place of origin: United Kingdom

Service history
- In service: 1943–1945
- Wars: World War II

Production history
- Designer: R.S. Gammon
- No. built: many thousands
- Variants: No. 82 Mk 1

Specifications
- Mass: 340 grams (empty)
- Filling: Typically composition C
- Filling weight: Variable: up to 900 grams
- Detonation mechanism: Instantaneously, on impact with the target

The Gammon bomb, officially known as the No. 82 grenade was a British hand grenade used during World War II.

== History ==
Designed by Capt. R. S. Gammon of the 1st Parachute Regiment, the Gammon bomb was developed as a replacement for the temperamental and highly dangerous "sticky bomb" grenade.

== Design ==
The Gammon bomb consisted of an elasticized stockinette bag made of dark coloured material, a metal cap, and a Number 247 all ways fuze, the same fuze as was found in the No. 69 grenade and No. 73 grenade. The bag was open at both ends; one end was crimped to the metal fuze assembly, the other was open to allow an explosive filling to be inserted by the user as the grenades were issued without explosive.

The Gammon bomb or grenade was an "improvised hand-thrown bomb used by the Home Guard, the Special Air Service and the Resistance, especially suitable for the destruction of parked aircraft or vehicles. An explosive charge was wrapped in fabric and sewn to an impact fuse that detonated on sharp contact".

Unlike conventional grenades, the Gammon bomb was flexible in the amount and type of munition that could be delivered to a target. For anti-personnel use, a small amount of plastic explosive (about half a stick), along with shrapnel-like projectiles, if available, would be placed in the bag.

Against armoured fighting vehicles or other armoured targets, the bag could be completely filled up with explosives, making an unusually powerful grenade which could only be thrown safely from behind cover.

=== Operation ===
Diagram of a Gammon bomb. British explosive ordnance

Using the Gammon bomb was very simple. After filling the stockinette bag with explosive, the screw-off cap was removed and discarded. Removing the screw-off cap revealed a stout linen tape wound around the circumference of the fuze. The linen tape had a curved lead weight on the end. While holding the lead weight in place with one finger (to prevent the linen tape from unwinding prematurely) the grenade was then thrown at the target.

When the Gammon grenade was thrown, the weighted linen tape automatically unwrapped in flight, pulling out a retaining pin from the fuze mechanism. Removal of the retaining pin freed a heavy ball-bearing and striker inside the fuze, which was then held back from the percussion cap only by a weak creep spring.

In this manner the all ways fuze became armed in flight. Impact with the target gave the heavy ball-bearing a sharp jolt - overcoming the weak resistance of the creep spring - that slammed the striker against the percussion cap. The percussion cap fired directly into the adjacent detonator, which in turn sent a violent shockwave into the main explosive filling contained inside the stockinette bag.

Detonation of a Gammon grenade was instantaneous on impact with the target, i.e. there was no time-delay.

== Adoption ==
Gammon bombs were primarily issued to special forces such as paratroopers who were issued plastic explosive routinely. These units found the Gammon bomb to be particularly useful due to its small size and weight when unfilled, as well as its adaptability.

The Gammon bomb was even effective against armoured vehicles, and paratroopers called it their "hand artillery".

It was also popular as a small amount of the C2 fast-burning explosive could heat a mug of coffee or K-rations without giving off any smoke from the bottom of a foxhole.

Gammon bombs were declared obsolete in the early 1950s, at which point many stocks were destroyed, though some continued in service up to at least 1957, even later in some other countries. Typically, most examples encountered today are in the form of drill, inert or UXO.

== Users ==
- Canada
- United Kingdom
- United States

== See also ==
- Mills bomb
- Stielhandgranate
