= No. 69 grenade =

Hand grenade developed and used during the Second World War

British No. 69
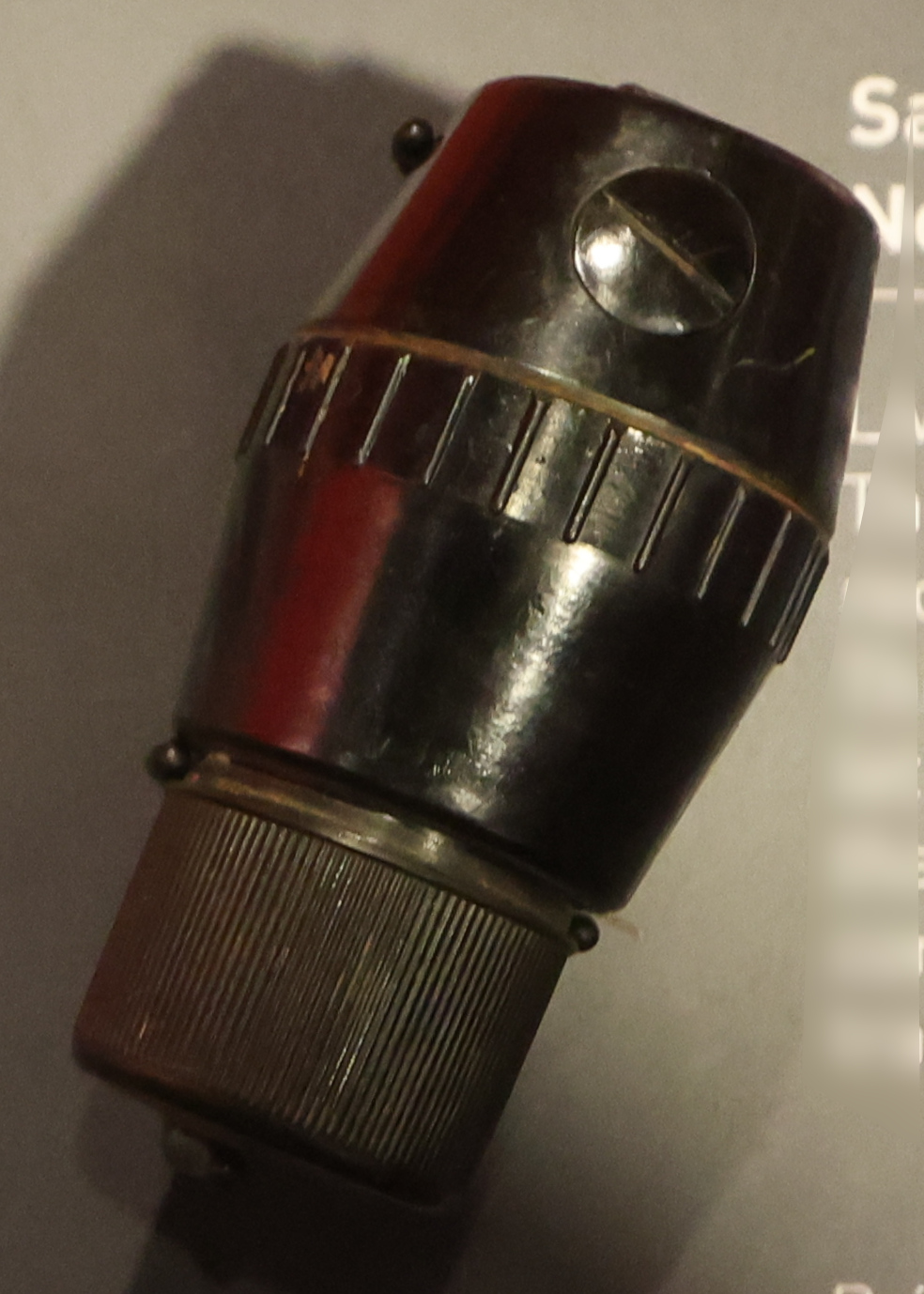
- Type: Hand grenade
- Place of origin: United Kingdom

Service history
- In service: August 1942 - 1947

Production history
- Designed: December 1940
- No. built: Many thousands
- Variants: Mk 1

Specifications
- Mass: 383 g (13.5 oz)
- Length: 114 mm (4.5 in)
- Diameter: 60 mm (2.4 in)
- Filling: High explosive
- Filling weight: 92 g (3.2 oz)
- Detonation mechanism: Impact

The British No. 69 was a hand grenade developed and used during the Second World War. It was adopted into service due to the need for a grenade with smaller destructive radius than the No. 36M "Mills bomb". This allowed the thrower to use a grenade even when there was little in the way of defensive cover. In contrast, the much greater destructive radius of the Mills bomb than its throwing range forced users to choose their throwing point carefully, in order to ensure that they would not be wounded by the shrapnel explosion of their own grenade.

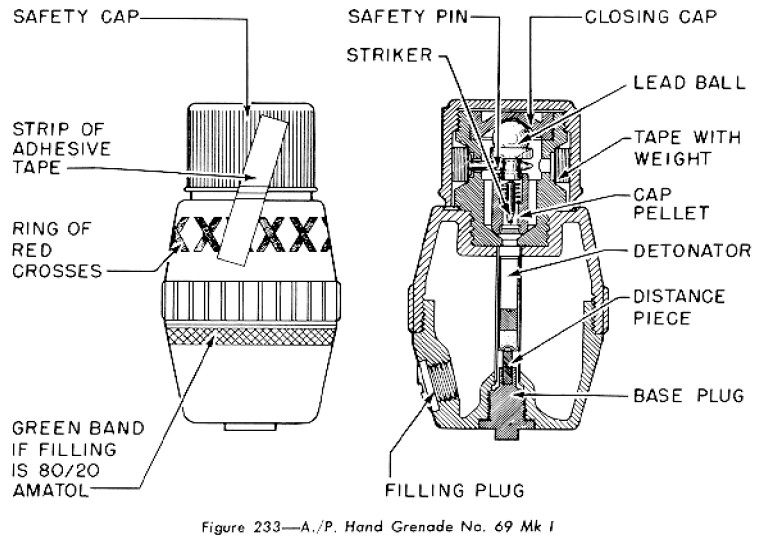
Externals and internals

The shell of the No. 69 grenade was composed entirely of the hard plastic, Bakelite, which shattered without producing fragments like a metal bodied grenade. Metal fragmenting sleeves were available to increase the grenade's lethality.

Using the No. 69 bomb was very simple: the screw-off cap was removed and discarded, and the grenade was then thrown. When the grenade was thrown, a linen tape with a curved lead weight on the end automatically unwrapped in flight, freeing a ball-bearing inside the fuze. In this manner the "all ways" action impact fuze was armed in flight and the grenade exploded on impact; and like the Gammon grenade, which used the same fuze design, it was withdrawn from service soon after the Second World War ended.

== All-ways fuze ==
The No. 69 was the first British device to make use of the "all-ways fuze" later seen in the No. 82 Gammon bomb, the No. 73 Thermos bomb and the No. 77 smoke grenade. The "all-ways" fuze is an impact-only fuze. The term "all-ways" refers to the fact that all of the possible ways in which the grenade could hit a target were guaranteed to trigger detonation. Normally, impact-detonated munitions must hit the target with a particular point of impact (i.e. perpendicular to the fuze mechanism) in order to detonate. In contrast, no matter which way the No. 69 grenade hit the target (e.g. landing on its base, or sideways or upside down) it would still explode.

The all-ways fuze was composed of a free-floating striker and detonator combination held apart by a weak spring. On top of this assembly was a steel ball bearing pressed against a conical housing by the striker. Any impact in the vertical axis would impart acceleration to either the striker or the detonator, causing the firing pin to contact and ignite the detonator. Any impact in the horizontal axis would cause the ball bearing to follow the slope of the conical housing converting the horizontal acceleration into a vertical one, touching off the detonator as before.

The fuze was worked by the user first unscrewing a plastic cap to expose a long, narrow cloth streamer with a curved lead weight attached to the end. Upon release from the hand or projector the weighted streamer, would catch the air and quickly unwind from the top of the grenade, eventually withdrawing a loose safety pin from the fuze. With the pin removed the striker and detonator would be free to come into contact, which would happen due to the force of impact when the grenade struck a hard surface.

The all-ways fuze had a minor design defect in that the hard steel ball bearing would be propelled away from the explosion as a piece of shrapnel. When used in an "offensive" application such as the No. 69 grenade, where the user was not required to take cover before throwing, there was a chance that the user could be struck and injured by the fast-moving ball bearing. According to military author Ian V. Hogg, this problem led to restrictions in the use of the grenade as practice ordnance.

== Markings ==
- A ring of red "X" in the top half between the safety cap and middle indicated that it has a filling suitable for tropical use (humidity).
- A green band just under the middle ring indicated an Amatol 80/20 filling.
- The white letters "BAR" on the green band indicated a Baratol 20/80 filling.
- The white letters "LYD" on the green band indicated a Lyddite filling.
