= Things That Go Bump in the Night (Dad's Army) =

- Dad's Army episode
- Episode no.: Series 6 Episode 6
- Directed by: David Croft
- Story by: Jimmy Perry and David Croft
- Original air date: 5 December 1973
- Running time: 30 minutes

Episode chronology
← Previous "The Honourable Man"	Next → "The Recruit"

"Things That Go Bump in the Night" is the sixth episode of the sixth series of the British television sitcom Dad's Army that was originally transmitted on 5 December 1973. This episode marked the last regular appearance of James Beck (Private Joe Walker) who died on 6 August 1973.

== Synopsis ==
During a stormy night, the platoon get lost in the middle of nowhere. Jones' van has only half a gallon of petrol remaining in its tank. Tired, cold and miserable, the men decide to spend the night in a nearby house. It appears to be deserted, but is it?

== Plot ==
Due to a miscalculation by Sergeant Wilson, the platoon are lost in a thunderstorm miles from anywhere. Jones informs Captain Mainwaring that his van only has half a gallon of petrol left (Walker had been unable to get the ink dry on the petrol coupons in time), so Mainwaring decides to shelter in a house nearby. Mainwaring has a slight head cold, so Jones restrains him from going out in the rain fearing he might catch pneumonia. The platoon march to the house holding a tarpaulin sheet above their heads. However, when Pike rings the doorbell, he lets go of his corner and ends up soaked.

Once at the house, they find that the front door is open, the electricity is off and the fire is still burning. Strangely, the house appears to be completely deserted. Frazer starts to get the impression that it is haunted. Pike has to change out of his wet clothes, so ends up wearing the vest of a flag-bearer's uniform and a bearskin rug (which has a bear's head on it). Suddenly, they hear the sound of hounds howling. Mainwaring tells them not to be worried, and they go upstairs to find somewhere to sleep.

Once in a bedroom, Mainwaring claims a single bed for himself, informing the others to sleep in the main double bed (NCOs at the top, other ranks at the bottom), on the couch and in a chair by the fireplace. However, Jones feels Mainwaring's bed, claims it is damp and refuses to let him sleep there until he has warmed it up. Jones puts a bed warmer in the sheets, but unfortunately sets it on fire. The platoon tries to blow it out with pillows, but just end up with feathers everywhere. Mainwaring tips a basin of water over the bed and Sponge tells Pike to get some more. Mainwaring is annoyed at Jones for ruining his bed and tells Frazer to shut the door. Frazer does so just as Pike is coming through with more water, and he ends up soaked again.

Later, as everybody is asleep, Pike wakes up Wilson (who gets a fright at the sight of the bearskin) and asks him if he can come into bed with him. Wilson says to ask Mainwaring, so Pike wakes up Jones and gets him to ask Mainwaring if he can come into bed; however, Mainwaring refuses because there is no room. Pike then asks Wilson whether he can accompany him to wash his hands and clean his teeth. Wilson reluctantly agrees, but only after Pike threatens to tell his mother if he does not come. Meanwhile, Godfrey wakes up Frazer because he needs to visit the bathroom. Frazer refuses to accompany him due to there being too many "unnatural causes", so Godfrey wakes up Mainwaring, who also refuses, so he wakes up Jones, who agrees, and they set off and meet Pike and Wilson coming back around a corner, frightening both parties.

Later, Pike, still unable to sleep, is woken up by the sound of heavy boots coming up the stairs. He warns the others, and they blow out the candles. The boots come towards the bedroom. The door opens slowly to reveal an upper-class accented officer, Captain Cadbury, who is surprised to find them in his bedroom.

In the morning, the platoon are having breakfast. It turns out that the house is a dog training school, and that Cadbury, the school's administrator, had left to fix the generator. Pike ends up wearing a German uniform that they use for training purposes as his uniform is still wet. Outside, Cadbury shows them the dogs, pointing out one, Prince 439, who is a troublemaker. The platoon set off to get some petrol, each carrying an empty gin bottle.

While out in the countryside, Cadbury informs them that the dogs are only half-trained and that they have not been taught how not to tear their victim to pieces. Walker then notices that the noise of the hounds is getting louder, and they realise the dogs must have got out. Cadbury then realises that they must be tracking them, because Pike's uniform is covered in aniseed. Thus, after Pike nearly rubs the aniseed on Mainwaring, the platoon makes a run for it, carrying Godfrey aboard a sheep hurdle. Once they reach a stream, Mainwaring tells the platoon that dogs cannot follow a scent across water, so Pike is made to cross downstream. Mainwaring refuses to get his feet wet and is carried across on the hurdle. Meanwhile, Pike falls in the river, once again getting soaked.

Once across, the platoon relax. However, Mainwaring's plan has failed as the hounds have followed them and they continue running. In the end, Mainwaring, Wilson, Frazer and Godfrey hide in a tool shed while the others climb trees. Cadbury suggests that Pike should throw his clothes down to the dogs, meaning that Pike is forced by Mainwaring to strip naked or else he will put him on a charge. Pike subsequently covers his genitals and backside with two small bags. This allows the platoon to escape and they continue their walk, with Pike wearing a potato sack and the German helmet.

== Cast ==
- Arthur Lowe as Captain Mainwaring
- John Le Mesurier as Sergeant Wilson
- Clive Dunn as Lance Corporal Jones
- John Laurie as Private Frazer
- James Beck as Private Walker (location scenes only, final appearance)
- Arnold Ridley as Private Godfrey
- Ian Lavender as Private Pike
- Jonathan Cecil as Captain Cadbury
- Colin Bean as Private Sponge

== Notes ==
1. The location scenes were the final appearance of James Beck as Private Joe Walker, as these were filmed earlier in May 1973 before the studio scenes and before Beck's death on 6 August 1973. For the studio scenes Walker is referred to but never seen, with the assumption that he is guarding the outside of the house, whilst Private Sponge was given most of Walker's lines. Walker is mentioned at the beginning and then appears during the scenes when the platoon are trying to evade the dogs.
