= Ampulomet =

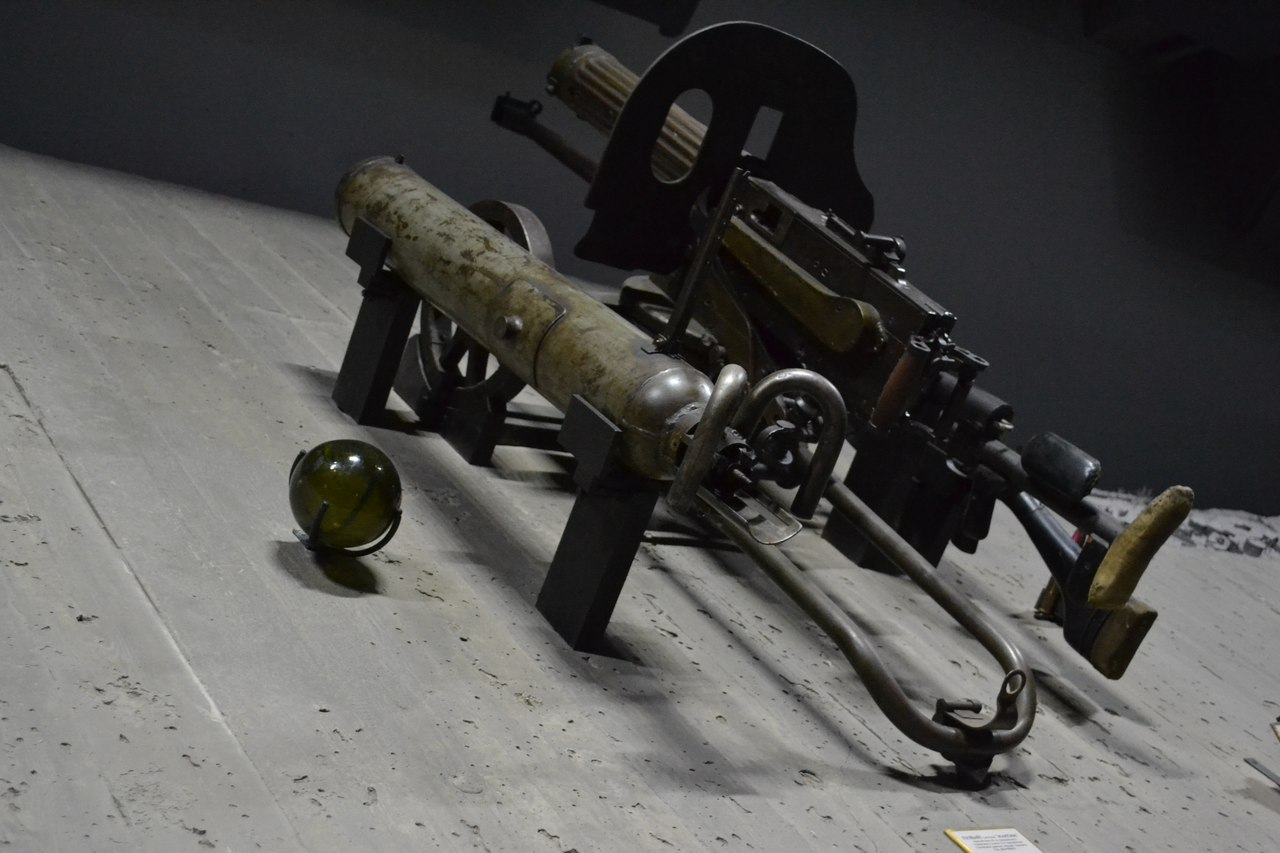
- Ampulomet and PM M1910 machine gun at the Museum of the Battle of Stalingrad.
- Place of origin: Soviet Union

Service history
- In service: 1941–1945
- Used by: Soviet Union; Finland (Captured); Nazi Germany (Captured)
- Wars: World War II

Production history
- Manufacturer: Leningrad
- Produced: 1941–1942

Specifications
- Mass: 26 kg (57 lb 5 oz)
- Length: 1 m (3 ft 3 in)
- Barrel length: .84 m (2 ft 9 in)
- Crew: 3
- Shell: Separate loading black powder charge and AZh-2 projectile containing KS incendiary.
- Shell weight: 1.5 kg (3 lb 5 oz)
- Caliber: 125 mm (4.9 in)
- Recoil: None
- Elevation: 0° to +12°
- Traverse: 360°
- Rate of fire: 8 rpm
- Muzzle velocity: 50 m/s (160 ft/s)
- Maximum firing range: 250 m (820 ft)

The Ampulomet (Russian: 125-мм ампуломёт образца 1941 года, also rendered Ampulomyot, ampulla mortar, etc., lit. "ampule/vial thrower" cf. миномёт) was an expedient anti-tank weapon which launched a 125 mm incendiary projectile made of spherical glass. This weapon was introduced in 1941 and used (to a limited degree) by the Red Army in World War II, but by 1942 was largely obsolete.

== Design ==
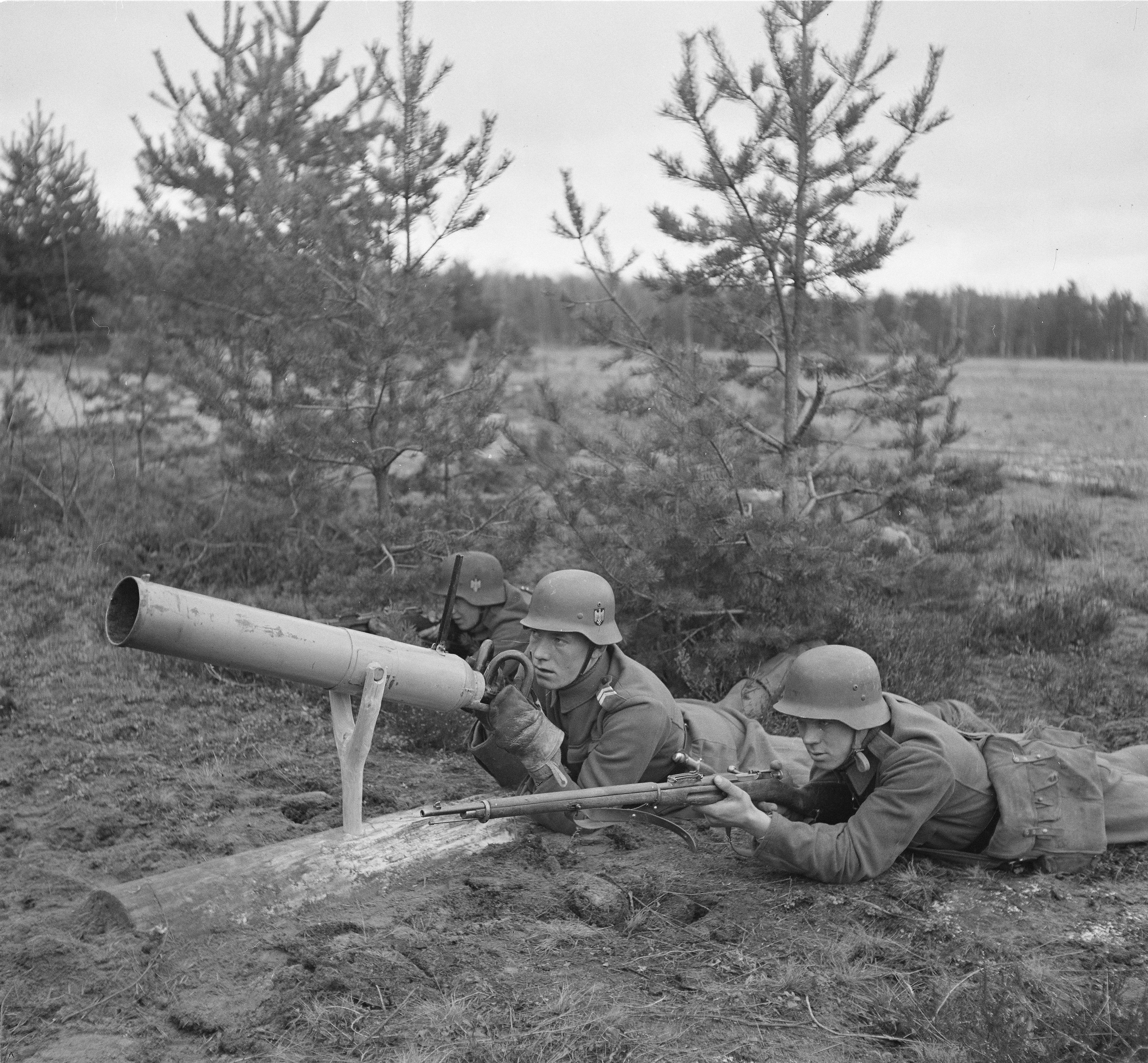
Finnish troops testing a captured Ampulomet in 1942.

The weapon consisted of an unrifled tube with a crude breech mounted on a Y-shaped pedestal which pivoted on trunnions to provide elevation. Two breech mounted inverted horns were provided for traverse/elevation and a simple inclinometer for targeting and range calculation. A black powder charge was inserted into the breech and fired by a percussion cap to propel the AZh-2 glass ampule. The ampules were filled with an incendiary mixture known as KS. KS was a mixture of 80% phosphorus and 20% sulfur which ignited when exposed to air. The burning mixture created a bright flame, thick white smoke and would burn for up to three minutes at temperatures between 800–1,000 °C (1,470–1,830 °F). The burning liquid would seep through vision slots or engine grilles on a tank and ignite ammunition or fuel as well as choke and blind the crew.

== See also ==
Northover Projector — A similar British weapon used by the Home Guard during World War II
