= The Honourable Man =

- Dad's Army episode
- Episode no.: Series 6 Episode 5
- Directed by: David Croft
- Story by: Jimmy Perry and David Croft
- Original air date: 28 November 1973
- Running time: 30 minutes

Episode chronology
← Previous "We Know Our Onions"	Next → "Things That Go Bump in the Night"

"The Honourable Man" is the fifth episode of the sixth series of the British comedy series Dad's Army. It was originally transmitted on 28 November 1973.

== Synopsis ==
When Sergeant Wilson lets it be known that his family has "moved up one place" and that he is now entitled to style himself "The Honourable," he finds himself being courted by the Golf Club and is being proposed as the man to welcome a visiting Soviet VIP. Captain Mainwaring is furious.

== Plot ==
In the church hall, the Town Clerk is opening a meeting. It is to decide on Walmington-on-Sea's welcome to a visiting Russian worker, who has been made Hero of the Soviet Union for building 5,723 tanks. The Town Clerk puts Mainwaring in charge of the committee after a pompous speech, but Warden Hodges objects, thus forcing a vote, which overwhelmingly supports Mainwaring, who therefore takes charge. During this, both Wilson and Corporal Jones arrive late. Frazer suggests that, after a great deal of thought, he would like to offer the Russian a voucher worth £10 towards the cost of a funeral. Walker argues that this is no use as the visitor would have to die to redeem it, whereupon Frazer comments "That's a risk I have to take". Godfrey again expresses his antipathy to "the reds" and so urges that the welcome should not be extravagant, and the vicar refuses to allow his choir to sing "The Red Flag". The committee decides to present a wooden key, representing the freedom of the town.

At the bank, Mainwaring enquires of Pike over Wilson's absence, and is annoyed to hear he is still at lunch, at 2.20pm. Pike finds a letter in Mainwaring's in-tray addressed to "The Honourable Arthur Wilson" and they both assume it is a joke. On Wilson's arrival he surprises Mainwaring and amazes Pike by asserting it is genuine: Wilson's uncle, a peer, has died with no children, thus entitling him to be styled "The Honourable". On being asked where he had been at lunchtime, Mainwaring is furious to hear Wilson has been invited to join the golf club (even though Wilson does not play golf), as he has been "trying to get in for years". Wilson compounds Mainwaring's rage by announcing that they found him some smoked salmon for lunch, whereas Mainwaring had a "snoek fishcake at the British Restaurant". During this discussion Pike has telephoned his mother, who bursts into the office and flings herself all over Wilson, although she does ask "It won't make any difference, will it?", to which Wilson assures her it will not. Pike, however, is too naive to understand the implication.

At the next parade, Jones recounts how the British officers in the Sudan who had the "Honourable" title always had a stiff upper lip, "even after their heads had been blown off". Mainwaring addresses the parade and insists that Wilson must do his motorcycle training on the platoon's motorbike. Then the platoon practise grounding arms and applauding, just as the Town Clerk arrives. In Mainwaring's office he suggests tentatively that "the Honourable Arthur Wilson" should present the key to the Russian instead of Mainwaring. Mainwaring refuses point blank. Back on parade, they are interrupted by the verger and the vicar, who invite Wilson to join the PCC, and also ask if he would like a crest for his own private pew. Mainwaring and Wilson retreat to the office, where Mainwaring again refuses to step aside for Wilson when telephoned by Hodges. Mainwaring finally snaps and reveals his intense jealousy over Wilson's newfound title; Wilson however admits he resents his new social status, as the people of Walmington continually pester him. This only infuriates Mainwaring more, as he fancies that one should prize aristocratic titles, and admits if he had a title he would make himself a director of the bank. He reminds Wilson that, title or not, he is still Mainwaring's employee and that he had better learn his place.

Later, the men are preparing the motorbike for Wilson's training. Wilson comes out dressed in khaki overalls. He wobbles unsteadily down the road, goes in and out of ditches and finally falls off in one; a car is seen coming to a halt to help him.

At the welcoming parade, a band, the Home Guard, the wardens and the nurses are lined up on the green. The visitor, Mr Vladislovski, arrives in his car, and makes his way to the podium. The Mayor makes a one-sentence speech, then Mainwaring makes a much longer one, but Vladislovski, through his interpreter, reacts angrily, accusing the VIPs greeting him of not being genuine workers, with soft, clean, uncalloused hands. He rushes to his car and produces Wilson from inside, whom he insists is a genuine worker, with oily hands, toiling alone in the countryside. He presents Wilson with the key representing the freedom of Walmington, and departs.

== Cast ==
- Arthur Lowe as Captain Mainwaring
- John Le Mesurier as Sergeant Wilson
- Clive Dunn as Lance Corporal Jones
- John Laurie as Private Frazer
- James Beck as Private Walker
- Arnold Ridley as Private Godfrey
- Ian Lavender as Private Pike
- Bill Pertwee as ARP Warden Hodges
- Edward Sinclair as The Verger
- Frank Williams as The Vicar
- Eric Longworth as Mr. Gordon (The Town Clerk)
- Pamela Cundell as Mrs. Fox
- Fred McNaughton as The Mayor
- Gabor Vernon as Mr Vladislovski
- Hana Maria Pravda as Interpreter
- Robert Raglan as Colonel Pritchard

== Notes ==
1. This episode concerns the uneasy alliance formed between the capitalist United Kingdom, its allies and the Communist Soviet Union, from 1941. Many of Walmington's citizens are uneasy about honouring a "red" and having "The Red Flag" sung. This was quite a common sentiment at the time, though as Mainwaring puts it "in time of war, one can't be too choosy about one's bedfellows".
2. Walker lightly references the 1939 Nazi-Soviet Pact, and subsequent Soviet invasion of Poland after Mainwaring mentions in his speech that Britain and the Soviet Union were "allies" even though they were "Poles apart".
3. Of all the episodes of Dad's Army, this is probably the one in which the class conflict between the middle-class Mainwaring and the upper-class Wilson, which is used for comedy throughout the series, is the most explored. In many episodes Mainwaring complains of Wilson's almost relaxed attitude to his duties and his public school education and about how hard he has had to work in comparison, but the deference shown by the townspeople towards Wilson's newly official status allows Mainwaring's chip-on-the-shoulder and Wilson's reticence at being snooty or arriviste about his position to be comprehensively played out on screen.
4. This would be the last complete episode of Dad's Army to feature James Beck as Walker. Beck would record two radio episodes of Dad's Army on Friday 13 July 1973; the following day he attended a school fete where he became ill and was taken home by his wife. He was later rushed to hospital where he died from a combination of heart failure, renal failure, and acute pancreatitis three weeks later on 6 August 1973, aged 44. His character was mentioned in the studio sequences of the following episode ("Things That Go Bump in the Night"), and was seen in the location footage which had been filmed in the spring of 1973. He was written out of the show in the last episode of this series, "The Recruit".
