= White phosphorus munition =

Incendiary munition

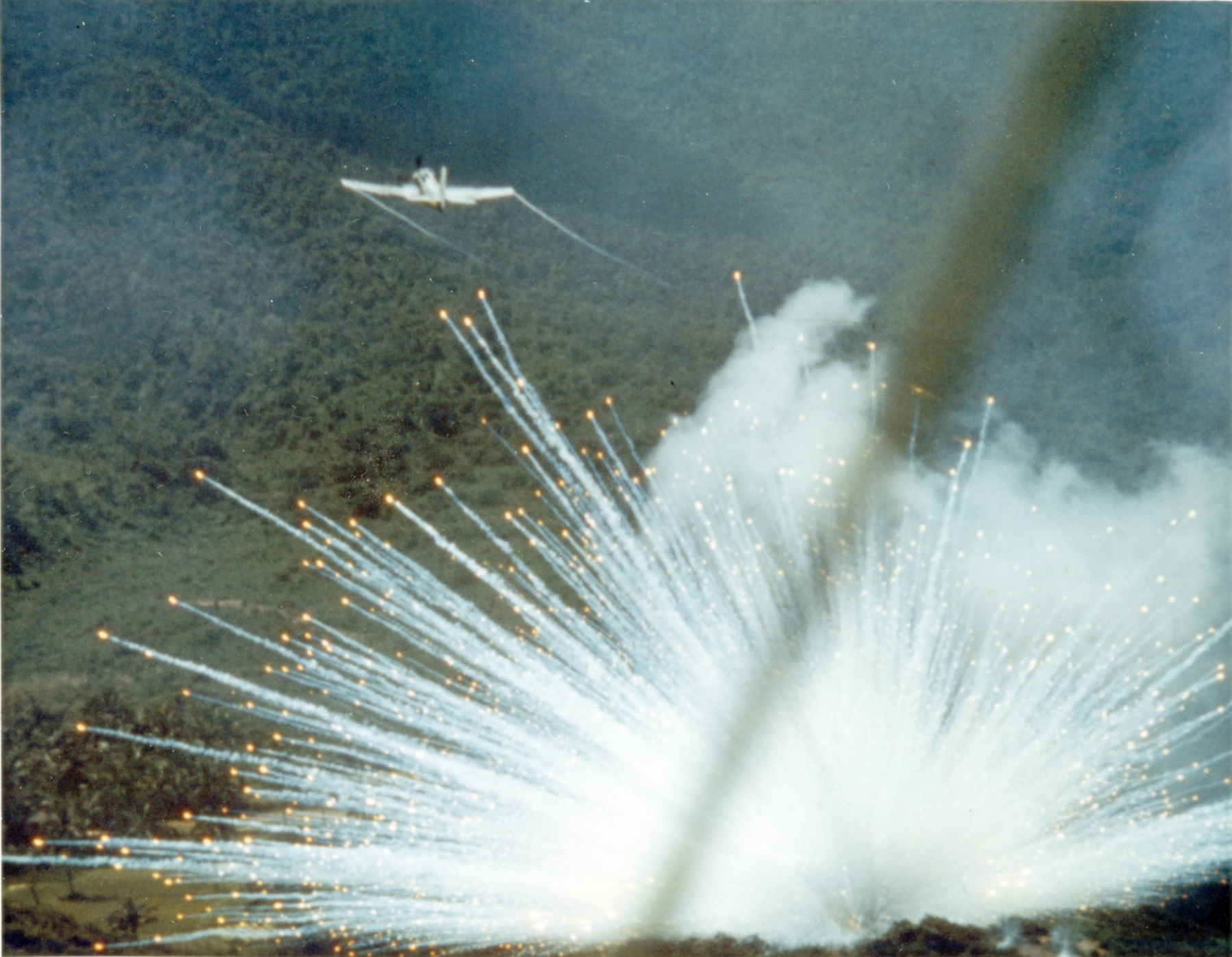
US Air Force Douglas A-1E Skyraider dropping a 100-pound (45 kg) M47 white phosphorus bomb on a Viet Cong position in South Vietnam in 1966

White phosphorus munitions are weapons that use one of the common allotropes of the chemical element phosphorus. White phosphorus is used in smoke, illumination, and incendiary munitions, and is commonly the burning element of tracer ammunition. Other common names for white phosphorus munitions include WP and the slang terms Willie Pete and Willie Peter, which are derived from William Peter, the World War II phonetic alphabet rendering of the letters WP. White phosphorus is pyrophoric (it is ignited by contact with air); burns fiercely; and can ignite cloth, fuel, ammunition, and other combustibles.

White phosphorus is a highly efficient smoke-producing agent, reacting with air to produce an immediate blanket of phosphorus pentoxide vapour. Smoke-producing white phosphorus munitions are very common, particularly as smoke grenades for infantry, loaded in defensive grenade launchers on tanks and other armoured vehicles, and in the ammunition allotment for artillery and mortars. These create smoke screens to mask friendly forces' movement, position, infrared signatures, and shooting positions. They are often called smoke/marker rounds for their use in marking points of interest, such as a light mortar to designate a target for artillery spotters.

== History ==
=== Early use ===
White phosphorus was used by Fenian (Irish nationalist) arsonists in the 19th century in a formulation that became known as "Fenian fire". The phosphorus would be in a solution of carbon disulfide; when the carbon disulfide evaporates, the phosphorus bursts into flames. The same formula was also used in arson in Australia.

=== World War I, the inter-war period and World War II ===
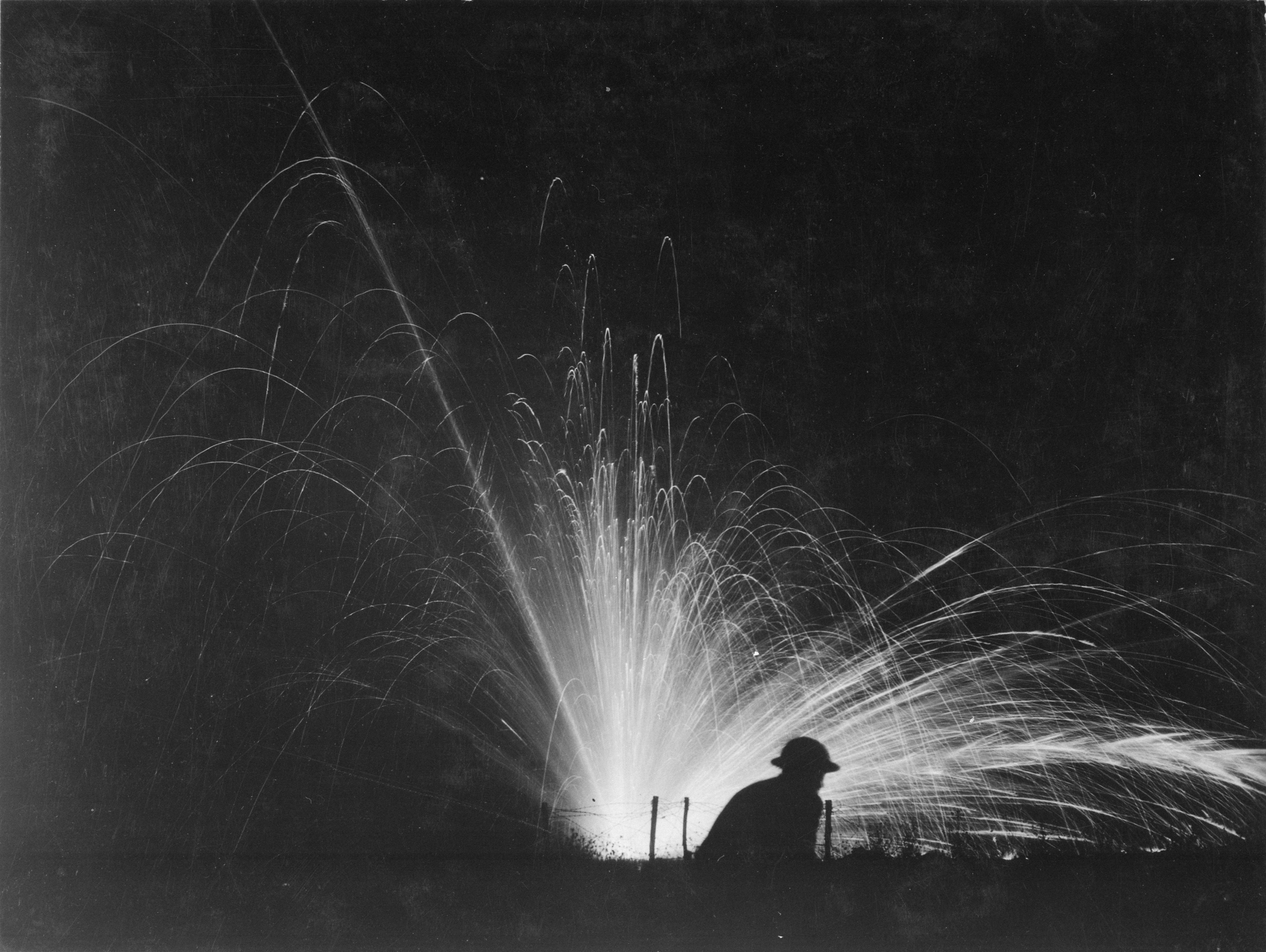
A WP mortar bomb explosion during manoeuvres in France, 15 August 1918

The British Army introduced the first factory-built white phosphorus grenades in late 1916 during the First World War. During the war, white phosphorus mortar bombs, shells, rockets, and grenades were used extensively by American, Commonwealth, and, to a lesser extent, Japanese forces, in both smoke-generating and antipersonnel roles. The Royal Air Force based in Iraq also used white phosphorus bombs in Anbar Province during the Iraqi revolt of 1920.

Among the many social groups protesting the war and conscription at the time, at least one, the Industrial Workers of the World in Australia, used Fenian fire.

In the interwar years, the US Army trained using white phosphorus, by artillery shell and air bombardment.

In 1940, when the German invasion of Great Britain seemed imminent, the phosphorus firm of Albright and Wilson suggested that the British government use a material similar to Fenian fire in several expedient incendiary weapons. The only one fielded was the Grenade, No. 76 or Special Incendiary Phosphorus grenade, which consisted of a glass bottle filled with a mixture similar to Fenian fire, plus some latex. It came in two versions, one with a red cap intended to be thrown by hand, and a slightly stronger bottle with a green cap, intended to be launched from the Northover projector, a crude 64 millimetres (2.5 in) launcher using black powder as a propellant. These were improvised anti-tank weapons, hastily fielded in 1940 when the British were awaiting a potential German invasion after losing the bulk of their modern armaments in the Dunkirk evacuation.

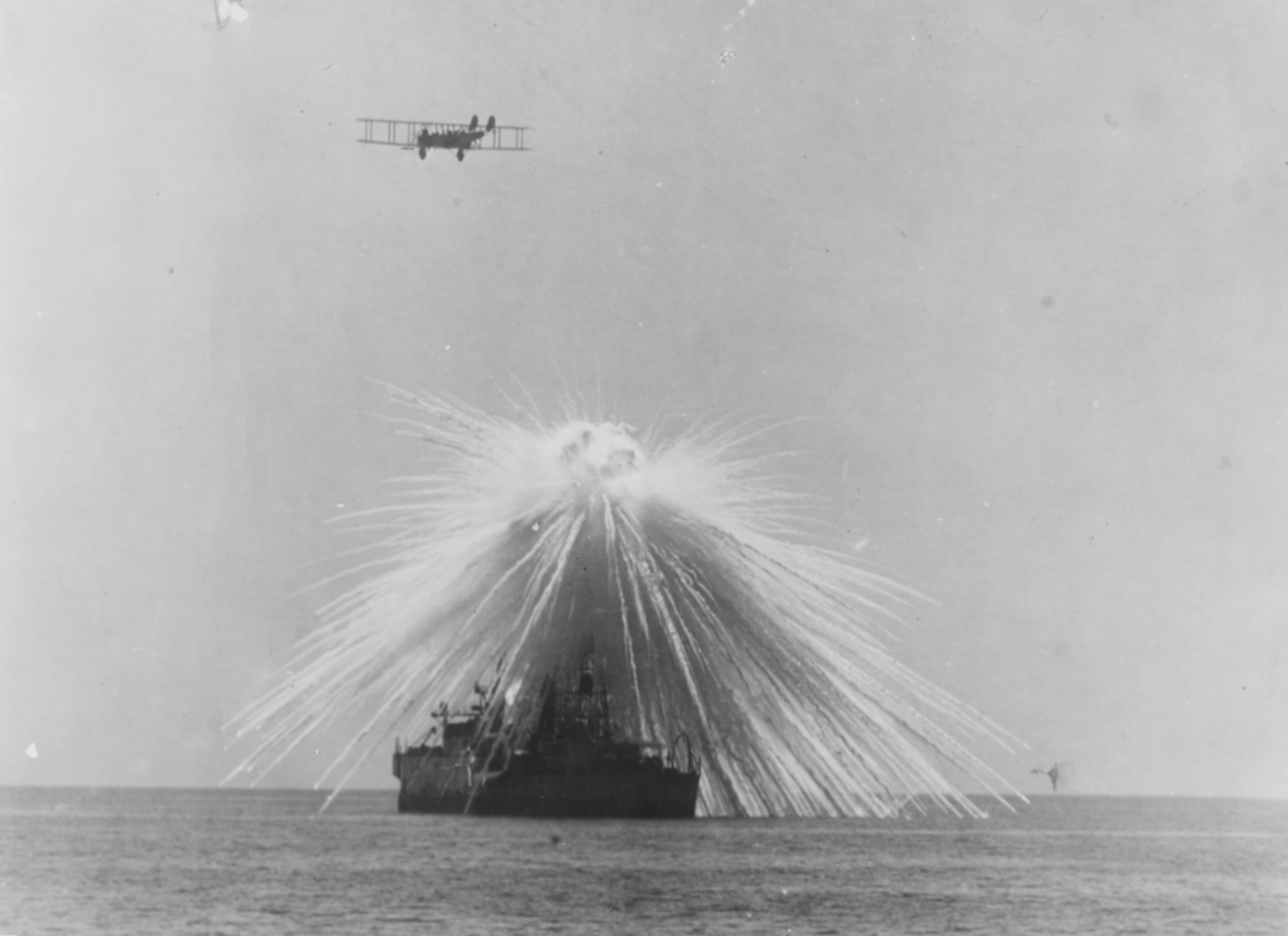
Air burst of a white phosphorus bomb over the USS Alabama during a test exercise conducted by Billy Mitchell, September 1921

At the start of the Normandy campaign, 20% of American 81 mm mortar ammunition consisted of M57 point-detonating bursting smoke rounds using WP filler. At least five American Medal of Honor citations mention their recipients using M15 white phosphorus hand grenades to clear enemy positions, and in the 1944 liberation of Cherbourg alone, a single US mortar battalion, the 87th, fired 11,899 white phosphorus rounds into the city. The US Army and Marines used M2 and M328 WP shells in 107 millimetres (4.2 in) mortars. White phosphorus was widely used by Allied soldiers for breaking up German attacks and creating havoc among enemy troop concentrations during the latter part of the war.

US Sherman tanks carried the M64, a 75mm white phosphorus round intended for screening and artillery spotting, but tank crews found it useful against German tanks such as the Panther that their APC ammunition could not penetrate at long range. Smoke from rounds fired directly at German tanks would be used to blind them, allowing the Shermans to close to a range where their armour-piercing rounds were effective. In addition, due to the turret ventilation systems sucking in fumes, German crews would sometimes be forced to abandon their vehicle: this proved particularly effective against inexperienced crews who, on seeing smoke inside the turret, would assume their tank had caught fire. Smoke was also used for "silhouetting" enemy vehicles, with rounds dropped behind them to produce a better contrast for gunnery.

=== Later 20th century uses ===
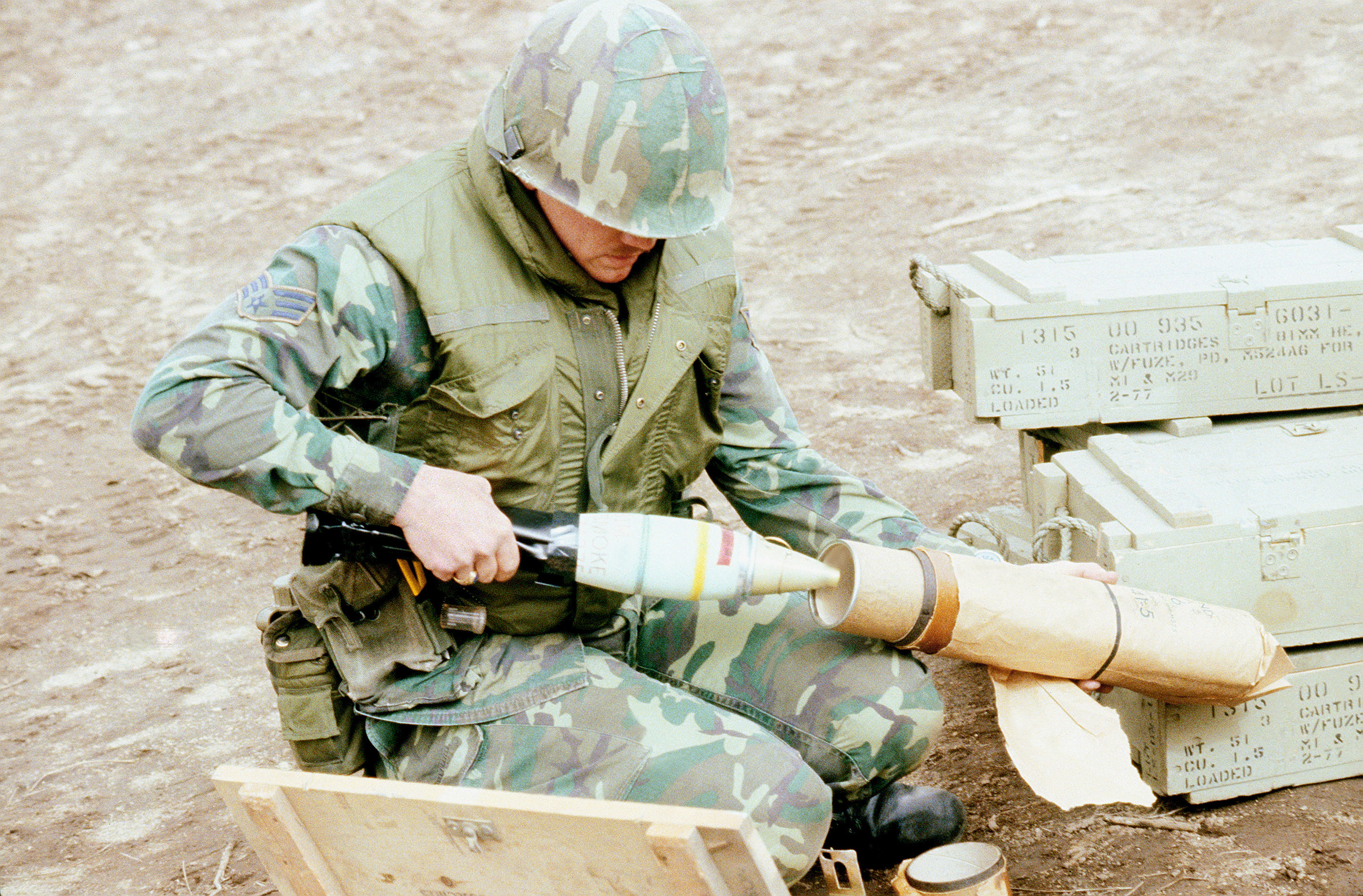
A USAF Security Police Squadron member packs an 81 mm white phosphorus smoke-screen mortar round during weapons training, 1980.

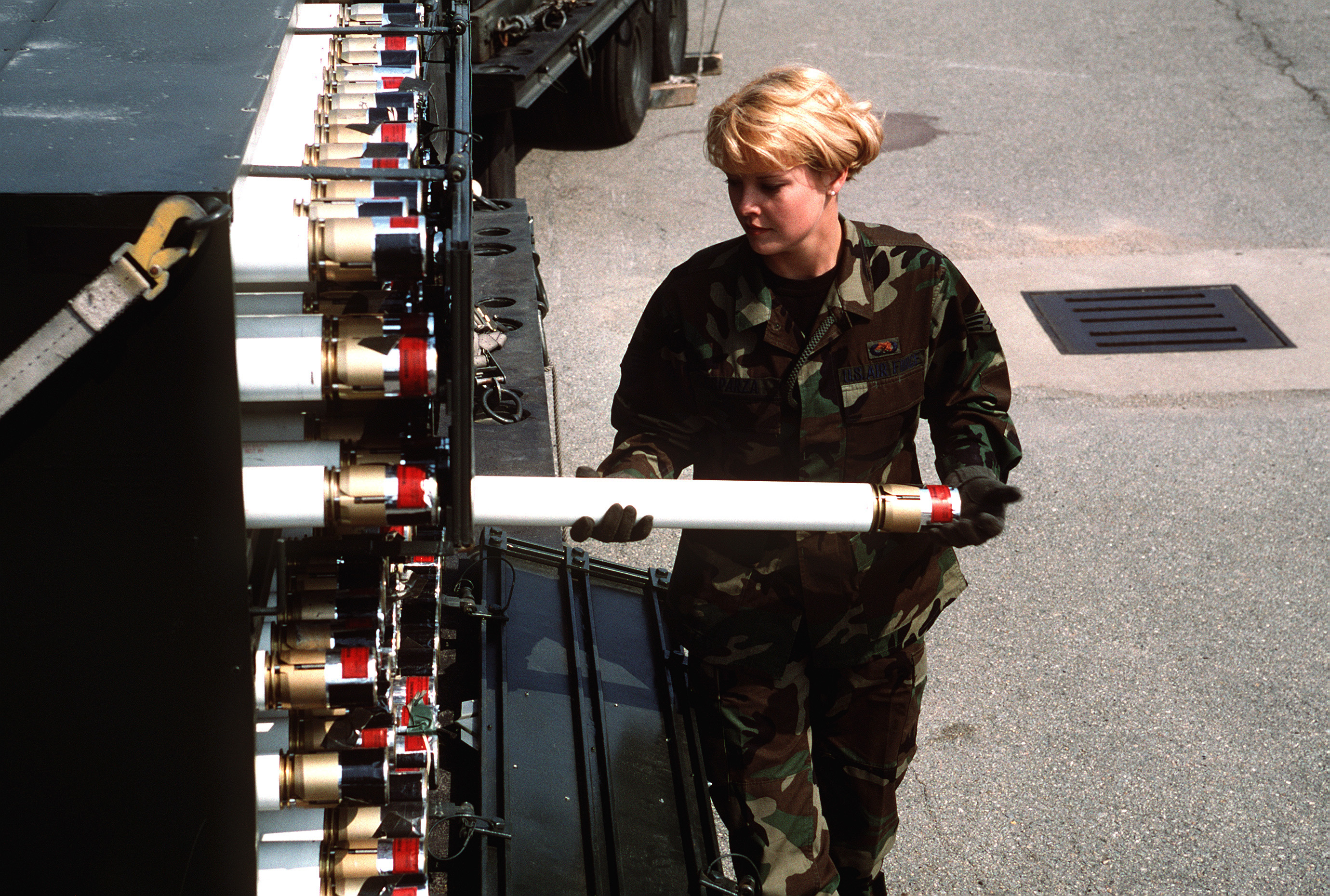
A Senior Airman of the United States Air Force inspects 70 millimetres (2.75 in) white phosphorus marker rockets at Osan Air Base, South Korea, in 1996.

White phosphorus munitions were used extensively by US forces in Vietnam and by Russian forces in the First Chechen War and Second Chechen War. White phosphorus grenades were used by the US in Vietnam to destroy Viet Cong tunnel complexes as they would burn up all oxygen and suffocate the enemy soldiers sheltering inside. British soldiers also made extensive use of white phosphorus grenades during the Falklands War to clear out Argentine positions as the peaty soil they were constructed on tended to lessen the impact of fragmentation grenades.

=== Use by US forces in Iraq ===
In November 2004, during the Second Battle of Fallujah, Washington Post reporters embedded with Task Force 2-2, Regimental Combat Team 7 stated that they witnessed artillery guns firing white phosphorus projectiles, which "create a screen of fire that cannot be extinguished with water. Insurgents reported being attacked with a substance that melted their skin, a reaction consistent with white phosphorous burns." The same article also reported, "The corpses of the mujaheddin which we received were burned, and some corpses were melted." The March/April 2005 issue of an official Army publication called Field Artillery Magazine reported that "White phosphorus proved to be an effective and versatile munition and a potent psychological weapon against the insurgents in trench lines and spider holes. ... We fired 'shake and bake' missions at the insurgents using W.P. [white phosphorus] to flush them out and H.E. [high explosives] to take them out".

The documentary Fallujah, The Hidden Massacre, produced by RAI TV and released 8 November 2005, showed video and photos that they claimed to be of Fallujah combatants and also civilians, including women and children, who had died of burns caused by white phosphorus during the Second Battle of Fallujah.

On 15 November 2005, following denials to the press from the US ambassadors in London and Rome, the US Department of Defense confirmed that US forces had used white phosphorus as an incendiary weapon in Fallujah, in order to drive combatants out of dug-in positions. On 22 November 2005, the Iraqi government stated it would investigate the use of white phosphorus in the battle of Fallujah. On 30 November 2005, the BBC quoted US General Peter Pace saying "It [WP munitions] is not a chemical weapon. It is an incendiary. And it is well within the law of war to use those weapons as they're being used, for marking and for screening." Professor Paul Rodgers from the University of Bradford department of peace and conflict studies said that white phosphorus would probably fall into the category of chemical weapons if it was used directly against people.

=== Use by Israeli forces in Lebanon ===
==== 2006 Lebanon War ====
During the 2006 Lebanon War, Israel said that it had used phosphorus shells "against military targets in open ground" in Southern Lebanon. Israel said that its use of these munitions was permitted under international conventions. However, President of Lebanon Émile Lahoud said that phosphorus shells were used against civilians. The first Lebanese official complaint about the use of phosphorus came from Information Minister Ghazi Aridi.

==== 2023 Israel–Lebanon border clashes and 2024 invasion ====
Amnesty International and Human Rights Watch accused Israel of using white phosphorous artillery shells indiscriminately in its attack in Dhayra, Lebanon on October 16, that injured at least nine civilians, and that it was unlawful. Amnesty is investigating this and other potential violations of international humanitarian law by all parties in the region. The claim was confirmed by The Washington Post, which identified two white phosphorus shell casings made in the United States.

By 6 March, the National Council for Scientific Research in Lebanon said 117 white phosphorous bombs had been dropped on southern Lebanon. Israel says that they have been using the substance to create a smokescreen on the battlefield; however, it has been alleged that its use was an attempt by Israel to make the land uninhabitable in the future.

According to a confidential report prepared by the government of one of United Nations Interim Force in Lebanon's contributing countries that was reviewed by the Financial Times, on 13 October multiple white phosphorus munitions were fired within 100 metres of a UNIFIL base, injuring 15 peacekeepers, after an incident where Israeli Merkava tanks had broken into the base and stayed for 45 minutes.

==== 2026 Israeli assault on Lebanon ====
On March 9, 2026, Human Rights Watch reported that Israel had used white phosphorus in its attacks on Lebanon, in violation of international law. Human Rights Watch verified and geolocated eight images showing white phosphorus being deployed on a residential part of town.

=== Use by Israeli forces in Gaza ===
Al Jazeera video showing airbursts from Israeli shelling and smouldering M825A1 WP submunitions in the streets of Gaza, 11 January 2009

In its early statements regarding the Gaza War of 2008–2009, the Israeli military denied using WP entirely, saying "The IDF acts only in accordance with what is permitted by international law and does not use white phosphorus." However, numerous reports from human rights groups during the war indicated that WP shells were being used by Israeli forces in populated areas.

On 5 January 2009, The Times of London reported that telltale smoke associated with white phosphorus had been seen in the vicinity of Israeli shelling. On 12 January, it was reported that more than 50 patients in Nasser Hospital were being treated for phosphorus burns.

On 15 January, the headquarters of the United Nations Relief and Works Agency in Gaza City was struck by IDF white phosphorous artillery shells, setting fire to pallets of relief materials and igniting several large fuel storage tanks. Senior Israeli defense officials maintain that the shelling was in response to Israeli military personnel being fired upon by Hamas fighters who were in proximity to the UN headquarters, and was used for smoke. The soldiers who ordered the attack were later reprimanded for violating the IDF rules of engagement. The IDF further investigated improper use of WP in the conflict, particularly in one incident in which 20 WP shells were fired in a built-up area of Beit Lahiya.

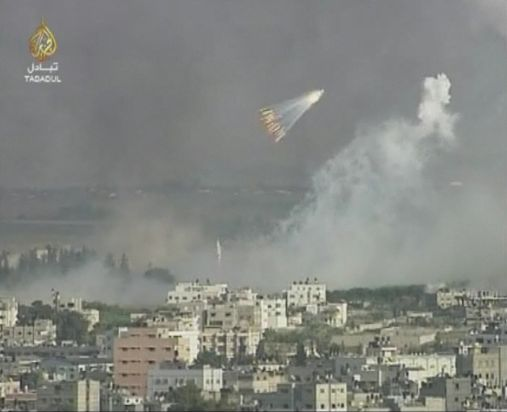
Airburst of an Israeli white phosphorus shell over Gaza City in the 2008–2009 war

After the Israel Defense Forces had officially denied for months having used white phosphorus during the war, the Israeli government released a report in July 2009 that confirmed that the IDF had used white phosphorus in both exploding munitions and smoke projectiles. The report argues that the use of these munitions was limited to unpopulated areas for marking and signaling and not as an anti-personnel weapon. The Israeli government report further stated that smoke screening projectiles were the majority of the munitions containing white phosphorus employed by the IDF and that these were very effective in that role. The report states that at no time did IDF forces have the objective of inflicting any harm on the civilian population.

Head of the UN Fact Finding Mission Justice Richard Goldstone presented the report of the Mission to the Human Rights Council in Geneva on 29 September 2009. The Goldstone report accepted that white phosphorus is not illegal under international law but did find that the Israelis were "systematically reckless in determining its use in built-up areas". It also called for serious consideration to be given to the banning of its use in built-up areas.

The 155mm WP artillery shells used by Israel are typically the American M825A1, a base-ejection shell which deploys an airbursting submunition canister. On detonation of the bursting charge, the canister deploys 116 units 19 millimetres (0.75 in), quarter-circle wedges of felt impregnated with 5.8 kilograms (12.75 lb) of WP, producing a smokescreen lasting 5–10 minutes depending on weather conditions. These submunitions typically land in an elliptical pattern 125–250 meters in diameter, with the size of the effect area depending on the burst height, and produce a smokescreen 10 metres in height.

=== Afghanistan (2009) ===
There are confirmed cases of white phosphorus burns on bodies of civilians wounded during US–Taliban clashes near Bagram. The United States has accused Taliban militants of using white phosphorus weapons illegally on at least 44 occasions. On the other hand, in May 2009, Colonel Gregory Julian, a spokesman for General David McKiernan, the overall commander of US and NATO forces in Afghanistan, confirmed that Western military forces in Afghanistan use white phosphorus in order to illuminate targets or as an incendiary to destroy bunkers and enemy equipment. The Afghan government later launched an investigation into the use of white phosphorus munitions.

=== Syrian civil war ===
The Syrian government, the United States, the Russian Federation, and Turkey reportedly deployed white phosphorus munitions via airstrikes and artillery on different occasions during the Syrian civil war.

=== Second Nagorno-Karabakh War ===
During the Second Nagorno-Karabakh War, on 31 October 2020 the Ministry of Defence of the unrecognised Republic of Artsakh stated that the Azerbaijani side had used phosphorus weapons to burn forests near Shusha (Shushi). Atlantic Council's Digital Forensic Research Lab (DFRLab) found OSINT evidence supporting these claims.

The Azerbaijani authorities, in turn, accused the Armenian forces of using white phosphorus on civilian areas. On 20 November, the Prosecutor General's Office of Azerbaijan filed a lawsuit, accusing the Armenian Armed Forces of using phosphorus ammunition in Nagorno-Karabakh, as well as in Tartar District.

== Regulation ==
=== Impact on humans ===
Phosphorus bombs are especially dangerous because of the chemical characteristics of the substance: it burns at temperatures above 800°C, sticks to various surfaces, (including skin and clothes), and is very difficult to extinguish once ignited. It can cause deep burns down to the bone, and remnants of it in tissues can reignite after initial treatment.

It is difficult for military doctors, who usually have limited access to medical resources, to provide timely and full treatment to victims of phosphorus munitions. Burn survivors may still die from organ failure due to the toxicity of white phosphorus.

Fires caused by incendiary projectiles can destroy civilian buildings and property, and damage crops and livestock. Humanitarian organizations such as Human Rights Watch have campaigned for phosphorus warheads to be included under the UN Convention on Certain Conventional Weapons.

Non-governmental international organizations have recorded the military use of white phosphorus in Syria, Afghanistan, the Gaza Strip, and other war zones. Militaries worldwide, including the US military, use white phosphorus for incendiary purposes.

=== International law ===
White phosphorus munitions are not banned under international law, but because of their incendiary effects, their use is supposed to be tightly regulated. Because white phosphorus has legal uses, shells filled with it are not directly prohibited by international humanitarian law. Experts consider them not as incendiary, but as masking, since their main goal is to create a smoke screen.

While in general white phosphorus is not subject to restriction, certain uses in weaponry are banned or restricted by general international laws: in particular, those related to incendiary devices. Article 1 of Protocol III of the Convention on Certain Conventional Weapons defines an incendiary weapon as "any weapon or munition which is primarily designed to set fire to objects or to cause burn injury to persons through the action of flame, heat, or combination thereof, produced by a chemical reaction of a substance delivered on the target". Article 2 of the same protocol prohibits the deliberate use of incendiary weapons against civilian targets (already forbidden by the Geneva Conventions), the use of air-delivered incendiary weapons against military targets in civilian areas, and the general use of other types of incendiary weapons against military targets located within "concentrations of civilians" without taking all possible means to minimise casualties. Incendiary phosphorus bombs may also not be used near civilians in a way that can lead to indiscriminate civilian casualties.

The convention also exempts certain categories of munitions from its definition of incendiary weapons: specifically, these are munitions which "may have incidental incendiary effects, such as illuminants, tracers, smoke or signalling systems" and those "designed to combine penetration, blast or fragmentation effects with an additional incendiary effect."

The use of incendiary and other flame weapons against matériel, including enemy military personnel, is not directly forbidden by any treaty. The United States military mandates that incendiary weapons, where deployed, not be used "in such a way as to cause unnecessary suffering." The term "unnecessary suffering" is defined through use of a proportionality test, comparing the anticipated military advantage of the weapon's use to the amount of suffering potentially caused.

=== Chemical weaponry ===
Despite their danger, the Chemical Weapons Convention does not classify phosphorus bombs as chemical weapons. This convention is meant to prohibit weapons that are "dependent on the use of the toxic properties of chemicals as a method of warfare", and defines a "toxic chemical" as a substance "which through its chemical action on life processes can cause death, temporary incapacitation or permanent harm to humans or animals". An annex lists chemicals that are restricted under the convention, and WP is not listed in the Schedules of chemical weapons or precursors.

In a 2005 interview with RAI, Peter Kaiser, spokesman for the Organisation for the Prohibition of Chemical Weapons (an organisation overseeing the CWC and reporting directly to the UN General Assembly), discussed cases where use of WP would potentially fall under the auspices of the CWC:

No it's not forbidden by the CWC if it is used within the context of a military application that does not require or does not intend to use the toxic properties of white phosphorus. White phosphorus is normally used to produce smoke, to camouflage movement.

If that is the purpose for which the white phosphorus is used, then that is considered under the convention legitimate use.

If on the other hand the toxic properties of white phosphorus are specifically intended to be used as a weapon, that, of course, is prohibited, because the way the convention is structured or applied, any chemicals used against humans or animals that cause harm or death through the toxic properties of the chemical are considered chemical weapons.

== Smoke-screening properties ==
Weight-for-weight, phosphorus is the most effective smoke-screening agent known, for two reasons: first, it absorbs most of the screening mass from the surrounding atmosphere and secondly, the smoke particles are actually an aerosol, a mist of liquid droplets which are close to the ideal range of sizes for Mie scattering of visible light. This effect has been likened to three dimensional textured privacy glass—the smoke cloud does not obstruct an image, but thoroughly scrambles it. It also absorbs infrared radiation, allowing it to defeat thermal imaging systems.

When phosphorus burns in air, it first forms phosphorus pentoxide (which exists as tetraphosphorus decoxide except at very high temperatures):

P_{4} + 5 O_{2} → P_{4}O_{10}

However phosphorus pentoxide is extremely hygroscopic and quickly absorbs even minute traces of moisture to form liquid droplets of phosphoric acid:

P_{4}O_{10} + 6 H_{2}O → 4 H_{3}PO_{4} (also forms polyphosphoric acids such as pyrophosphoric acid, H_{4}P_{2}O_{7})

Since an atom of phosphorus has an atomic mass of 31 but a molecule of phosphoric acid has a molecular mass of 98, the cloud is already 68% by mass derived from the atmosphere (i.e., 3.2 kilograms of smoke for every kilogram of WP); however, it may absorb more because phosphoric acid and its variants are hygroscopic. Given time, the droplets will continue to absorb more water, growing larger and more dilute until they reach equilibrium with the local water vapour pressure. In practice, the droplets quickly reach a range of sizes suitable for scattering visible light and then start to dissipate from wind or convection.

Because of the great weight efficiency of WP smoke, it is particularly suited for applications where weight is highly restricted, such as hand grenades and mortar bombs. An additional advantage for hand smoke grenades—which are more likely to be used in an emergency—is that the WP smoke clouds form in a fraction of a second. Because WP is also pyrophoric, most munitions of this type have a simple burster charge to split open the casing and spray fragments of WP through the air, where they ignite spontaneously and leave a trail of rapidly thickening smoke behind each particle. The appearance of this cloud forming is easily recognised; one sees a shower of burning particles spraying outward, followed closely by distinctive streamers of white smoke, which rapidly coalesce into a fluffy, very pure white cloud (unless illuminated by a coloured light source).

Various disadvantages of WP are discussed below, but one which is particular to smoke-screening is "pillaring". Because the WP smoke is formed from fairly hot combustion, the gasses in the cloud are hot, and tend to rise. Consequently, the smoke screen tends to rise off the ground relatively quickly and form aerial "pillars" of smoke which are of little use for screening. Tactically this may be counteracted by using WP to get a screen quickly, but then following up with emission type screening agents for a more persistent screen. Some countries have begun using red phosphorus instead. Red phosphorus ("RP") burns cooler than WP and eliminates a few other disadvantages as well, but offers exactly the same weight efficiency. Other approaches include WP soaked felt pads (which also burn more slowly, and pose a reduced risk of incendiarism) and PWP, or plasticised white phosphorus.

=== Plasticized white phosphorus (PWP) ===
White phosphorus, when dispersed by the bursting charge, tends to become too finely divided. The reaction then becomes too fast, releases too much heat at once, and the smoke cloud rises up. After series of experiments, in 1944 the NDRC Munitions Development Laboratory at University of Illinois developed a plasticization method. The white phosphorus granules, big about as grains of sand, are coated with GR-S (Government Rubber-Styrene) rubber, gelled with xylene. The resulting rubbery mass does not atomize so readily, gets broken up to several millimeters sized pieces, and burns for several minutes, reducing the pillaring. However, incendiary effects are reduced too, albeit the larger pieces are more effective against enemy troops. One of the disadvantages of PWP is the tendency of phosphorus to separate from the rubber matrix, when stored in hot weather.

== Physiological effects ==
NFPA 704 safety square
- 4 4 2

In addition to direct injuries caused by fragments of their casings, white phosphorus munitions can cause injuries in two main ways: burn injuries and vapour inhalation.

=== Burning ===
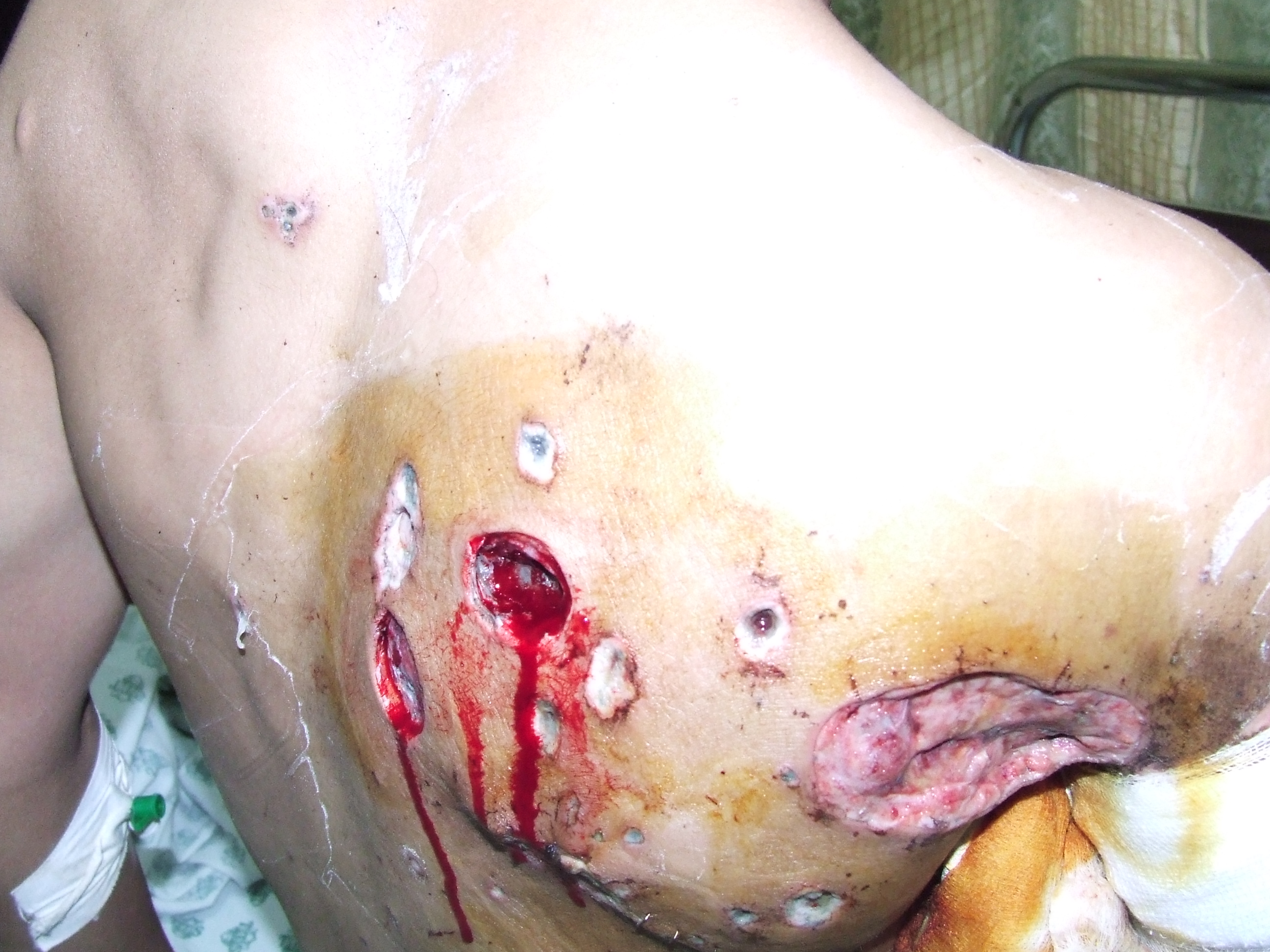
Gazan youth undergoing hospital treatment for white phosphorus injuries

In munitions, white phosphorus burns readily with flames of 800 °C (1,472 °F). Incandescent particles from weapons using powdered white phosphorus as their payload produce extensive partial- and full-thickness burns, as will any attempt to handle burning submunitions without protective equipment. Phosphorus burns carry an increased risk of mortality due to the absorption of phosphorus into the body through the burned area with prolonged contact, which can result in liver, heart and kidney damage, and in some cases multiple organ failure. White phosphorus particles continue to burn until completely consumed or starved of oxygen. In the case of weapons using felt-impregnated submunitions, incomplete combustion may occur resulting in up to 15% of the WP content remaining unburned. Such submunitions can prove hazardous as they are capable of spontaneous re-ignition if crushed by personnel or vehicles. In some cases, injury is limited to areas of exposed skin because the smaller WP particles do not burn completely through personal clothing before being consumed.

Due to the pyrophoric nature of WP, penetrating injuries are immediately treated by smothering the wound using water, damp cloth or mud, isolating it from oxygen until fragments can be removed: military forces will typically do so using a bayonet or knife where able. Bicarbonate solution is applied to the wound to neutralise any build-up of phosphoric acid, followed by removal of any remaining visible fragments: these are easily observed as they are luminescent in dark surroundings. Surgical debridement around the wound is used to avoid fragments too small to detect causing later systemic failure, with further treatment proceeding as with a thermal burn.

=== Smoke inhalation ===
Burning white phosphorus produces a hot, dense, white smoke consisting mostly of phosphorus pentoxide in aerosol form. Field concentrations are usually harmless, but at high concentrations the smoke can cause temporary irritation to the eyes, mucous membranes of the nose, and respiratory tract. The smoke is more dangerous in enclosed spaces, where it can cause asphyxiation and permanent respiratory damage. The US Agency for Toxic Substances and Disease Registry has set an acute inhalation Minimum Risk Level (MRL) for white phosphorus smoke of 0.02 mg/m^{3}, the same as fuel-oil fumes. By contrast, the chemical weapon mustard gas is 30 times more potent: 0.0007 mg/m^{3}. The agency cautioned that studies used to determine the MRL were based on extrapolations from animal testing and may not accurately reflect the health risk to humans.

== See also ==
- Mark 77 bomb
- Napalm
