= Smith Gun =

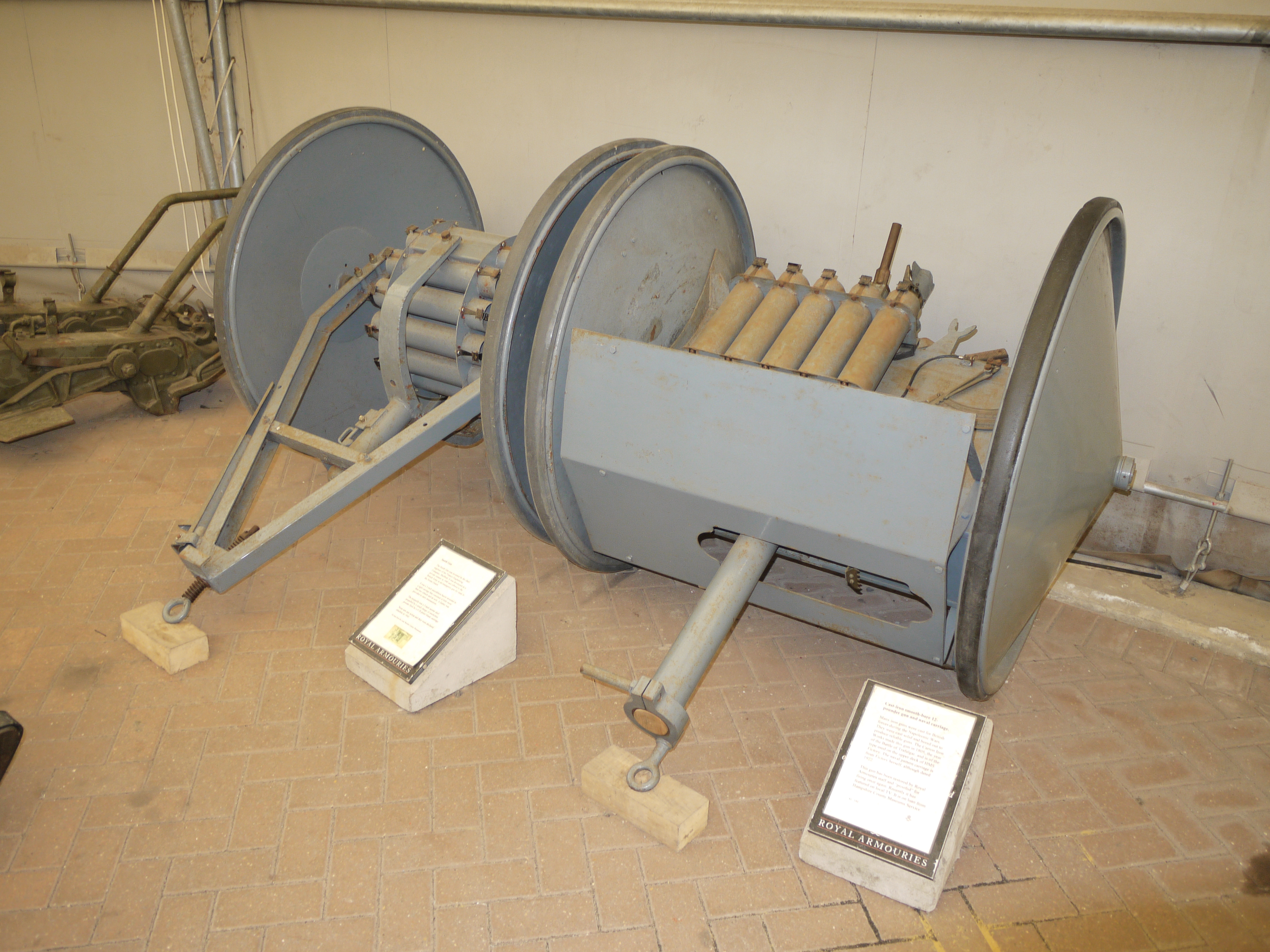
- Smith Gun and limber at The Royal Armouries, Fort Nelson.
- Type: Artillery
- Place of origin: United Kingdom

Service history
- In service: 1940–1945
- Used by: British Army, Home Guard, RAF Regiment
- Wars: Second World War

Specifications
- Mass: 604 lb (274 kg)
- Barrel length: 54-inch (140 cm)
- Crew: 4
- Calibre: 3.185-inch (80.90 mm)

The Smith Gun was an ad hoc anti-tank artillery piece used by the British Army and Home Guard during the Second World War.

With a German invasion of Great Britain seeming likely after the defeat in the Battle of France, most available weaponry was allocated to the regular British Army, leaving the Home Guard short on supplies, particularly anti-tank weaponry. The Smith Gun was designed by retired Army Major William H. Smith as a makeshift anti-tank weapon, and was put into production in 1941 following a demonstration to the Prime Minister, Winston Churchill.

The weapon consisted of a 3-inch (76 mm) smooth-bore barrel approximately 54 inches (1,400 mm) long mounted on a carriage and capable of firing both modified 3-inch mortar anti-tank and anti-personnel rounds. Despite the promising-sounding nature of the weapon, which at trials in ideal conditions achieved a maximum range of 1,600 yards (1,500 m), it was generally regarded as a short-range weapon with an accepted effective range of between 100 and 300 yards (90–270 m). Furthermore, it was heavy and awkward to manhandle, not simply to move around but also to tip over onto the correct wheel on firm level ground so it lay in, and remained in, the correct firing configuration.

It was also alleged to have developed 'a terrifying reputation for killing its crew' when finally issued in 1942, following production difficulties. It was issued mainly to Home Guard units and those units in the regular Army tasked with point defence, such as guarding airfields - and ammunition shortages meant that on average these units only had six or seven modified mortar rounds per gun. Despite these limitations, many Home Guard units developed an attachment to the weapon, some later claiming it was 'one of the best pieces of equipment ever issued to the force'.

== Development ==
With the end of the Battle of France and the evacuation of the British Expeditionary Force from the port of Dunkirk between 26 May and 4 June 1940, a German invasion of Great Britain seemed likely. However, the British Army was not well-equipped to defend the country in such an event; in the weeks after the Dunkirk evacuation it could only field twenty-seven divisions. The Army was particularly short of anti-tank guns, 840 of which had been left behind in France, and only 167 were available in Britain; ammunition was so scarce for the remaining guns that regulations forbade even a single round being used for training purposes.

Given these shortcomings, those modern weapons that were available were allocated to the British Army, and the Home Guard was forced to supplement the meagre amount of outdated anti-tank weapons and ammunition they had with ad hoc weapons, one such being the Smith Gun. The Smith Gun had what Mackenzie describes as an 'unorthodox origin', like many of the other weapons produced for use by the Home Guard. Invented by retired British Army Major William H. Smith, the managing director of Trianco Ltd., a firm of structural engineers. The Smith Gun was intended to be a cheap and easily manufactured anti-tank weapon.

When submitted to the Ordnance Board - which remained unconvinced of its merits - Prime Minister, Winston Churchill, witnessed a demonstration of the weapon in 1941 and ordered that it be put into production.

== Design ==
The Smith Gun consisted of a 3-inch (76 mm) calibre smooth-bore barrel, 54 inches (1,400 mm) in length, and mounted on a carriage 'like a two-wheeled baby carriage', but weighing approximately 604 pounds (274 kg). A basic shield was provided between the two wheels to cover for the crew but one of the unconventional aspects of the design was when mobile the weapon lay on its side, so that to fire a Smith Gun had to be tipped over onto one of the wheels, which acted as a combined base plate and turntable, while the other proved some overhead protection for the crew. (This meant in firing configuration the Smith Gun resembled a miniature, rather antiquated, naval gun mount of the pre-Dreadnought era.)

This unorthodox deployment gave the Smith Gun 360 degrees of rotation which, combined with a maximum 40-degree elevation, produced a basic firing-plate-mounted field weapon light enough to be towed behind a civilian vehicle, despite not being designed for this. (Home Guard units quickly discovered this fact, having to be prohibited from doing so as it would damage the weapon's wheels (and possibly the axle), inhibiting or even preventing traverse.) Happily, ammunition shortages made the similarly constructed limber redundant and so a source of spare parts.

The Smith Gun was capable of firing both anti-personnel and anti-tank rounds (the latter capable of penetrating some 60 mm of armour), and provided the Home Guard and local defence units with a potentially potent anti-personnel and anti-armour weapon. However, there were several flaws in its design, and as such it was not well liked by some of the Home Guard units to which it was issued. It was heavy and awkward to manhandle, particularly over rough ground and in urban areas; in the latter, it was recommended that toggle ropes be used to manoeuvre the weapon into position. The low muzzle velocity meant that shells were lobbed in a high curved trajectory, making precise range calculations and firing experience vital. This was difficult when so few rounds were available for training, a problem compounded by early batches possessing faulty fuzes that led to the Smith Gun's alleged 'terrifying reputation for killing its crew'. (This probably arises from the first fatal malfunction when, during a live-fire exercise in 1942, Corporal Cecil Edward Maynard of 2819 Squadron, RAF Regiment was killed in an explosion.)

== Operational history ==
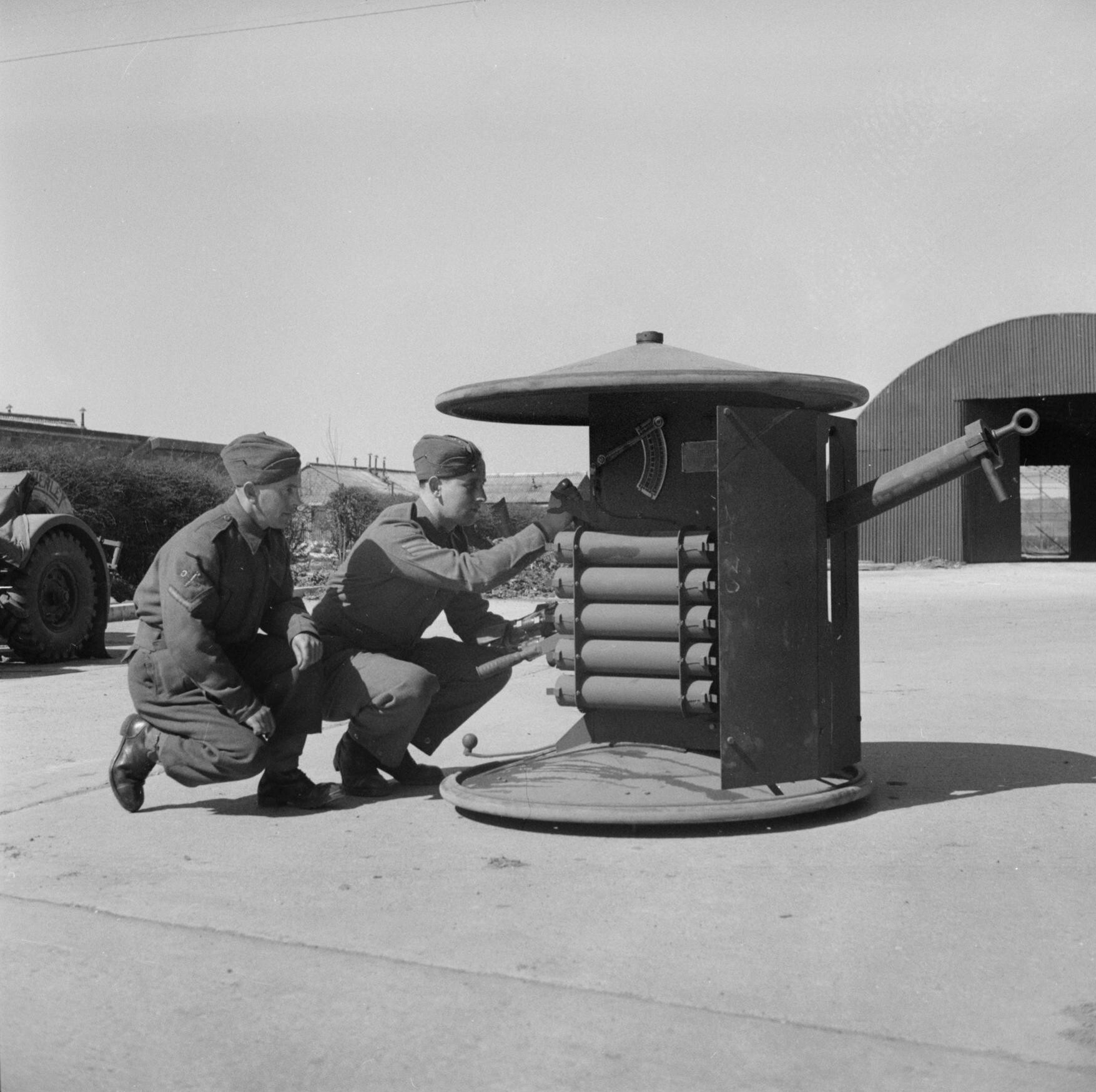
The Smith gun in the firing position.

Production on the Smith Guns began in late 1941, but problems with their manufacture meant that it was not until mid-1942 that the first batch were delivered to the Home Guard; by the beginning of 1943, a total of 3,049 Smith Guns had been issued to Home Guard units. Production problems also affected the ammunition for the weapons; a delay in manufacturing anti-tank ammunition meant that each weapon was only supplied with six or seven rounds. A number of Smith Guns were also issued to regular army units tasked with guarding airfields. Soon after issue a malfunction caused an explosion resulting in the death of Corporal Maynard of 2819 Squadron, RAF Regiment. Similar incidents followed and all Smith Guns were withdrawn from RAF Regiment units in 1943.

It was generally operated by a crew of four; commander, loader, layer and the driver who helped with the ammunition. One was mounted onto a Bren Carrier, although this innovation was not repeated.

Despite the many problems with the weapon, and its tendency to injure or even kill those who manned it, the government attempted to portray it in a positive light, issuing special instructions in the autumn of 1942 which stated that the Smith Gun was a "simple, powerful and accurate weapon which, if properly handled, will add greatly to the fire power of the Home Guard." After a period of initial distrust, many Home Guard units appear to have taken to the Smith Gun and attempted to make the best use of it: Mackenzie states that some units even had 'a growing sense of affection for the weapon' and describes how, when a letter was published in The Times towards the end of the conflict criticizing the weapon, numerous Home Guard volunteers replied with their own letters describing how satisfactory the Smith Gun had been; they also stated that it was 'one of the best pieces of equipment ever issued to the force'.

It was partly replaced in the anti-armour role by the Ordnance QF 2-pounder, that began to be released to Home Guard units in late 1943 and was more accurate and mobile than the Smith Gun, but lacked explosive ammunition. No Smith Guns were used in active service, and they were declared to be obsolete in 1945.

== See also ==
- Northover Projector – (United Kingdom)
- Blacker Bombard – (United Kingdom)
- "We Know Our Onions" - a Dad's Army episode featuring the Smith Gun

== Bibliography ==
- Clarke, Dale (19 September 2011). "Arming the British Home Guard, 1940–1944". hdl:1826/6164.
- Fletcher, David; Bryan, Tony (2005). Universal Carrier 1936–48: The 'Bren Gun Carrier' Story. Osprey Publishing. ISBN 978-1-84176-813-7.
- Kinard, Jeff (2007). Artillery: An Illustrated History of Its Impact. ABC-CLIO. ISBN 978-1-85109-556-8.
- Lampe, David (1968). The Last Ditch: Britain's Secret Resistance and the Nazi Invasion Plan. Greenhill Books. ISBN 978-1-85367-730-4.
- Lowry, Bernard; Taylor, Chris; Boulanger, Vincent (2004). British Home Defences 1940–45. Osprey Publishing. ISBN 978-1-84176-767-3.
- Mackenzie, S.P. (1995). The Home Guard: A Military and Political History. Oxford University Press. ISBN 978-0-19-820577-7.
- Oliver, Kinglsey (2002). The RAF Regiment at War. Pen & Sword. ISBN 978-0-85052-852-7.
- Sainsbury, J.D. (2016). The Home Guard in Hertfordshire 1940-1945. Welwyn, Hertfordshire: Hart Books. ISBN 978-0-948527-12-8.
