= Blacker Bombard =

29-mm Spigot Mortar (Blacker Bombard)
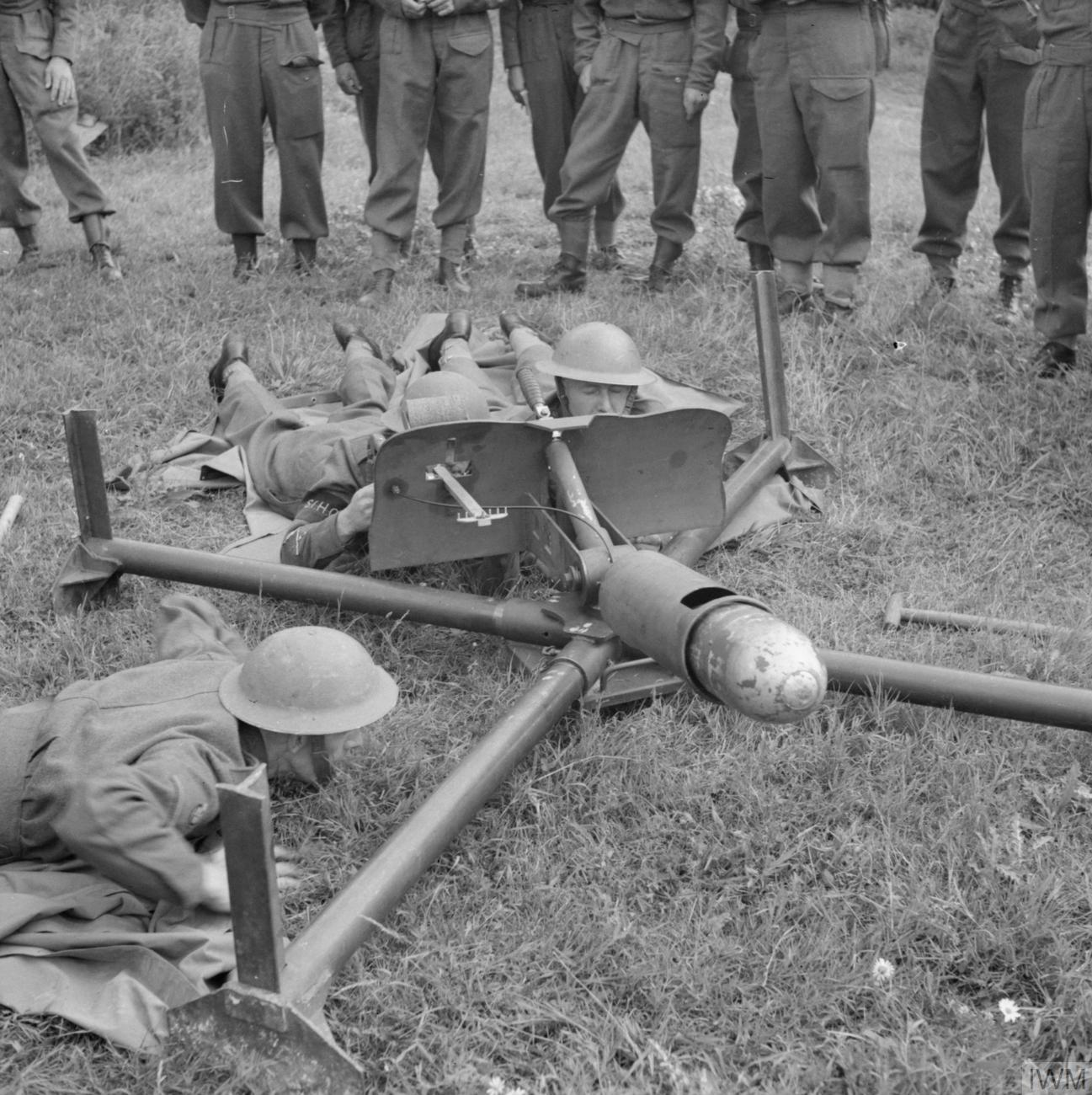
- Men of the Saxmundham Home Guard prepare to fire a Blacker Bombard during training with War Office instructors, 30 July 1941.
- Type: Anti-tank mortar
- Place of origin: United Kingdom

Service history
- In service: 1941–1942
- Used by: British Army; Home Guard
- Wars: World War II

Production history
- Designer: Lieutenant Colonel Stewart Blacker
- Designed: 1940
- No. built: c. 22,000

Specifications
- Mass: 112–407 lb (51–185 kg)
- Crew: 3–5
- Calibre: 29 mm (1.1 in) (nominal calibre – diameter of spigot)
- Breech: Spigot mortar
- Traverse: 360°
- Rate of fire: 6–12 rounds per minute
- Muzzle velocity: 245 ft/s (75 m/s)
- Effective firing range: 100 yd (91 m) 20lb bomb
- Maximum firing range: 450 yd (410 m) 20lb bomb 785 yd (718 m) 14lb bomb

The Blacker Bombard, also known as the 29-mm Spigot Mortar, was an infantry anti-tank weapon devised by Lieutenant-Colonel Stewart Blacker in the early years of the Second World War.

Intended as a means to equip Home Guard units with an anti-tank weapon in case of German invasion, at a time of grave shortage of weapons, it was accepted only after the intervention of Churchill. Although there were doubts about the effectiveness of the Bombard, many were issued. Few, if any, saw combat.

== Development ==
With the end of the Battle of France and the evacuation of the British Expeditionary Force from the port of Dunkirk between 26 May and 4 June 1940, a German invasion of Great Britain seemed likely. However, the British Army was not well-equipped to defend the country in such an event; in the weeks after the Dunkirk evacuation it could field only twenty-seven divisions. (The German Army had more than 100 divisions at that time.) The Army was particularly short of anti-tank guns, 840 of which had been left behind in France, and only 167 were available in Britain; ammunition was so scarce for the remaining guns that regulations forbade even a single round being used for training purposes.

Given these shortcomings, those modern weapons that were available were allocated to the British Army, and the Home Guard was forced to supplement the meagre amount of outdated weapons and ammunition they had with ad hoc weapons. One of these was the Blacker Bombard, designed by Lieutenant Colonel Stewart Blacker, the origins of which went back to the 1930s. During the early part of the 1930s, Blacker became interested in the concept of the spigot mortar. Unlike conventional mortars the spigot mortar did not possess a barrel, and instead there was a steel rod known as a 'spigot' fixed to a baseplate; the bomb itself had a propellant charge inside its tail. When the mortar was to be fired, the bomb was pushed down onto the spigot, which exploded the propellant charge and blew the bomb into the air.

Blacker began to experiment with the concept in the hopes of creating a platoon mortar that was lighter in weight than the one used by the British Army at the time. This evolved into the Arbalest, which he submitted to the Army but was rejected for a Spanish design. Undeterred by this rejection, Blacker went back to the design and came up with the idea of an anti-tank weapon, although he was initially stymied in his attempts to design one because the spigot design failed to generate the required velocity to penetrate armour. However he was eventually successful in creating an anti-tank mortar, which he named the Blacker Bombard.

When the Second World War began, Blacker was a lieutenant-colonel in the Territorial Army. He had offered his Bombard to the War Office for two years without success but was introduced to the government department of Military Intelligence Research (MIRc) later known as MD1, which had been given the task of developing and delivering weapons for use by guerilla and resistance groups in Occupied Europe. Blacker showed his list of ideas to the head of MD1, Major Millis Jefferis, who was taken with the design for the Bombard. He argued that it could serve in an anti-tank and artillery capability, and claimed that it would have similar anti-tank properties to the 2 pounder anti-tank gun coupled with approximately the same range as the 3-inch mortar. Objections were raised by the Director of Artillery and other government officials, but on 18 August 1940 the Prime Minister, Winston Churchill, attended a demonstration of the weapon. Churchill took a liking to the weapon and ordered it into full production. It would act as a temporary anti-tank weapon for the Home Guard until more 2 pounders could be supplied to them.

It was decided by General Headquarters Home Forces that Bombards would be useful as an anti-tank weapon for use by regular forces, as well as the Home Guard. General Alan Brooke, Commander-in-Chief, Home Forces, entertained doubts about the weapon's effectiveness, but believed that its simplicity would allow it to be used by younger soldiers. In Southern Command, 14,000 were ordered for use by forces in that area; twenty-four were to be issued to anti-tank regiments, twelve to troops assigned to guard aerodromes, eight per brigade and two for each Home Guard company. However, RAF personnel were forbidden from using the weapons, a restriction which was extended to the RAF Regiment when it was formed in 1942.

== Design ==
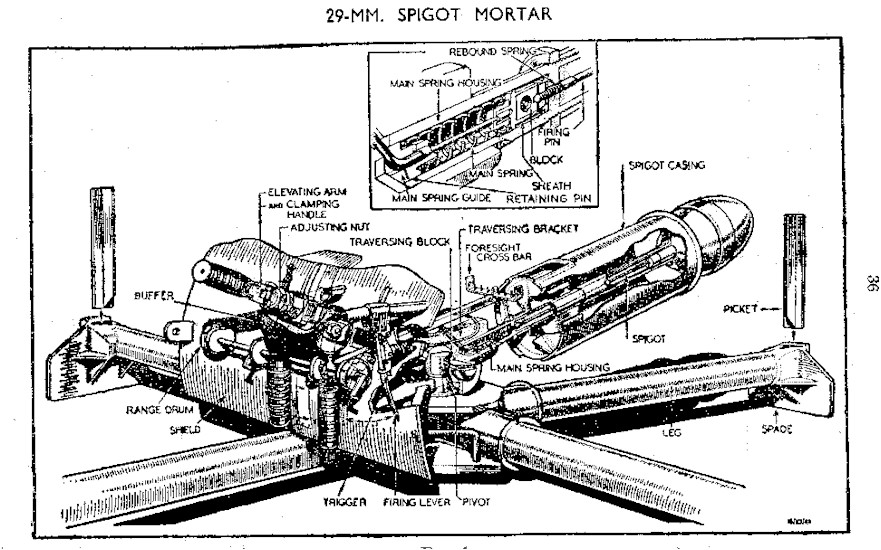
Cutaway diagram of the Blacker Bombard

The Bombard was a 29mm spigot mortar, weighing 112 lb alone, 360 lb on its mobile platform, and 407 lb including the required emplacement tools. Two types of ammunition were provided for the weapon – a 20 lb anti-tank bomb and a lighter 14 lb anti-personnel bomb, with each weapon being issued with 150 rounds of the former and 100 of the latter. It was able to fire the 20 lb bomb to a maximum range of approximately 450 yards, although the fighting range was considered to be a maximum of 150. When the bomb detonated, it was able to inflict significant damage on a tank, although it was unlikely to actually pierce the vehicle's armour as the projectile was not able to gain sufficient velocity. Its 14 lb anti-personnel round could be fired to 785 yards. It was served by a crew of between three and five men. The Bombard was considered to be most effective at short range, with targets being engaged with 'considerable success' at a range of between 75–100 yards. It was a muzzle-loaded weapon and therefore had a slow rate of fire, averaging between six and twelve rounds per minute; as such it was considered vital that the weapon be well-camouflaged and that it hit the target with the first shot.

The anti-tank rounds were found to possess several problems. They had insensitive fuzes, which meant that they would often pass through an unarmoured target without detonating, and when they did explode fragments were often thrown back at the crew. The Bombard was either affixed to a large cruciform platform, or an immobile concrete pedestal; in either case would usually be placed in range of defensive positions, such as road-blocks. It seems that there was a preference for the Bombard to be used primarily in a static role, with extra mountings being built by the Royal Engineers to provide alternative positions from which the weapon could be fired. In a static position, the weapon was usually emplaced in a pit with ammunition lockers nearby.

The entire Bombard - mortar, "pivot" (base), four legs, "pickets" (ground stakes), two sledgehammers and toolbox - could be transported as five man loads.

== Ammunition ==
Anti-tank H.E. 20-lb. bomb

- Propellent: 270 gr (17 g) of cordite
- Bomb weight: 19.5 lb (8.8 kg)
- Filling: 8.75 lb (3.97 kg) of Nobels No.808 explosive. Described as "gelatinous" in training pamphlet.
- Length: 26 in (0.66 m)
- Diameter: 6 in (150 mm)
- Fuze: No. 283 Mark I in body of bomb

Anti-tank practice inert 20-lb. bomb

- painted black
- single use
- filled with inert material
- could be used for demonstration or ranging shots

Practice inert 15/20-lb. bomb
Used with practice cartridge of 185 gr (12.0 g) cordite, it had the same trajectory as 20lb bomb out to 200 yd (180 m). This practice round could be fired up to 15 times against soft targets/ground.

- Weight: 15 lb (6.8 kg)
- Filling: concrete

H.E. 14-lb. bomb (anti-personnel)

- Propellent: 308 gr (20.0 g) of cordite
- Bomb weight: 14.75 lb (6.69 kg)
- Filling: Nobels No.704B explosive, or Amatol 80/20.
- Fuze: No. 152 (same as ML 3-inch mortar) in nose of bomb
- Danger area: 300 yd (270 m) from bursting point
- Killing area: 100 yd (91 m) from bursting point

In addition there was a drill example of the anti-tank round.

== Operational history ==
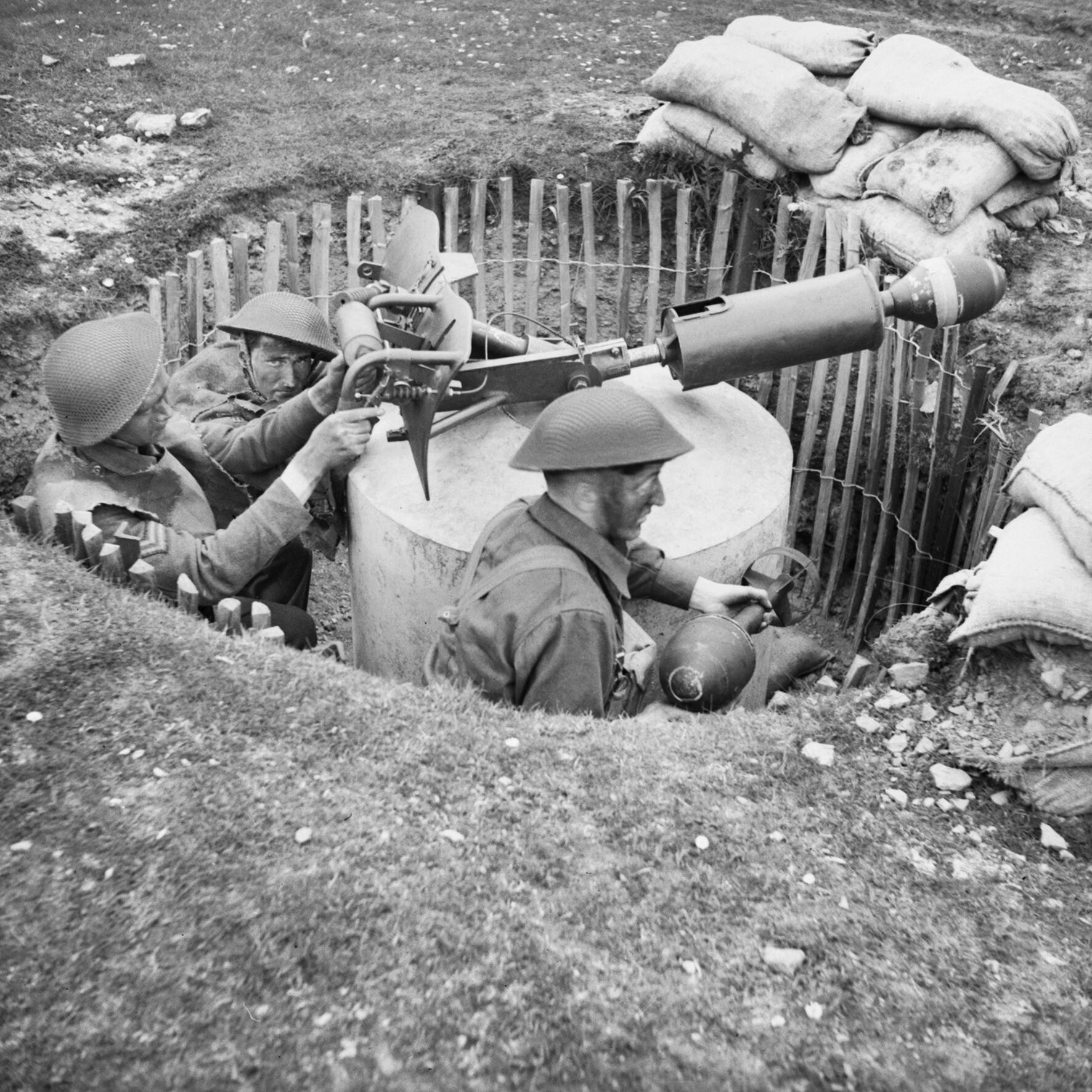
Home Guard soldiers training with a Bombard on a fixed concrete mounting (May 1943)

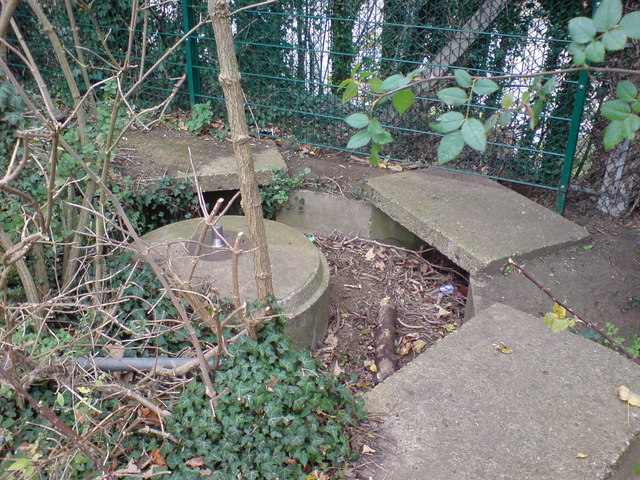
An abandoned Bombard emplacement, Brompton, Kent (2007)

The first Bombards appeared in late 1941, and were issued to both regular and Home Guard units; in Southern Command, no more were issued after July 1942. By that time, approximately 22,000 Bombards had been produced and issued to forces throughout the country. By November 1941, concerns were already being aired about the suitability of the weapon and it was unpopular with a number of units; some attempted to trade their Bombards for Thompson submachine guns or refused to use them at all. However, Mackenzie cites the argument of the historian of the Ministry of Food Home Guard battalion, who stated that the issuing of the Bombard meant that the Home Guard was being taken seriously by the government. Mackenzie also argues that the Bombard did have a positive side, because it equipped otherwise unarmed Home Guard personnel with a weapon, and was a "public relations" success.

It would appear that a number of Bombards saw action with the British Army, being used in an anti-personnel role in the Western Desert Campaign, although their use may have been limited due to their weight. The design of the Bombards was the basis for the Royal Navy anti-submarine weapon known as the Hedgehog.

Large numbers of fixed concrete pedestals for Bombards were installed, and a significant number survive in their original positions in many parts of the United Kingdom. The Defence of Britain Project, a late-1990s field survey of 20th century military landscape features by the Council for British Archaeology, recorded a total of 351 surviving pedestals.

== Users ==
Some of the users of the Blacker Bombard included:

- United Kingdom
- Australia
- New Zealand
- India
- Soviet Union

== See also ==
- Smith Gun
- Northover Projector
- Spigot gun
- PIAT
- Hedgehog (anti-submarine spigot mortar)

== Bibliography ==
- Hogg, Ian (1995). Tank Killers: Anti-Tank Warfare by Men and Machines. Pan Macmillan. ISBN 978-0-330-35316-8.
- Lampe, David (1968). The Last Ditch: Britain's Secret Resistance and the Nazi Invasion Plan. Greenhill Books. ISBN 978-1-85367-730-4.
- Lowry, Bernard; Taylor, Chris; Boulanger, Vincent (2004). British Home Defences 1940–45. Osprey Publishing. ISBN 978-1-84176-767-3.
- Mackenzie, S.P. (1995). The Home Guard: A Military and Political History. Oxford University Press. ISBN 978-0-19-820577-7.
- Macrae, Stuart (1971). Winston Churchill's Toyshop. Roundwood Press. ISBN 978-0-900093-22-7.
