= Northover Projector =

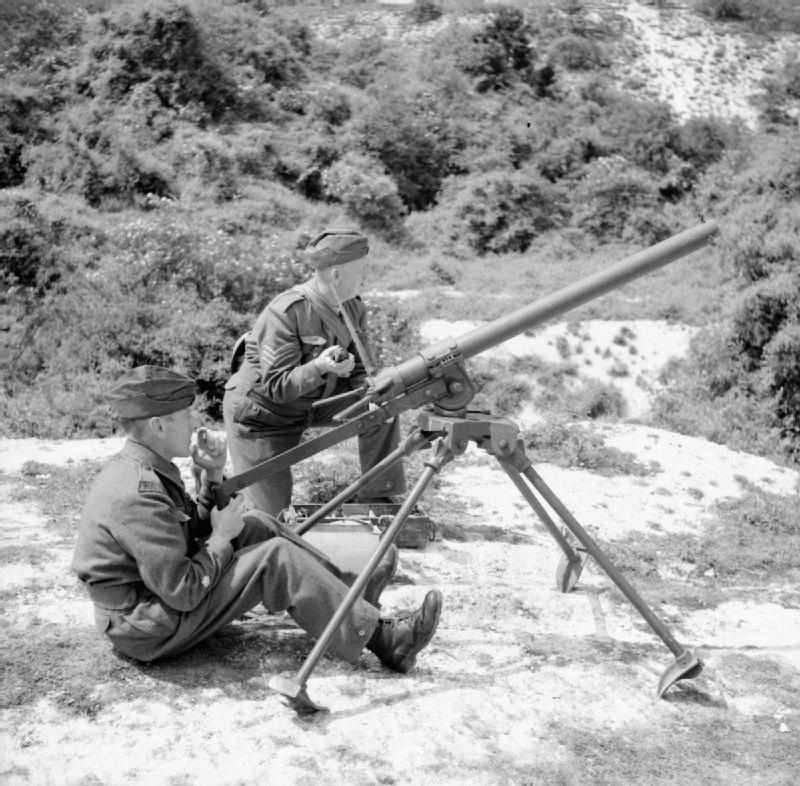
- Members of the Home Guard using a Northover Projector, 1 July 1941.
- Type: Grenade launcher
- Place of origin: United Kingdom

Service history
- In service: 1940–1945
- Used by: British Army, Home Guard
- Wars: Second World War

Production history
- Designer: Major Robert Harry Northover
- Designed: 1940
- Unit cost: £10 (1940)
- Variants: Northover Mk 2

Specifications
- Mass: 27.2 kilograms
- Barrel length: 914 mm (36.0 in)
- Calibre: 2.5 inch
- Elevation: free
- Traverse: free
- Muzzle velocity: 60m/sec (200ft/sec)
- Effective firing range: 251 m (274 yd)

The Projector, 2.5 inch—more commonly known as the Northover Projector—was an ad hoc anti-tank weapon used by the British Army and Home Guard during the Second World War.

With a German invasion of Great Britain seeming likely after the defeat in the Battle of France, most available weaponry was diverted to the regular British Army, leaving the Home Guard short on supplies, particularly anti-tank weaponry. The Northover Projector was designed by Home Guard officer Robert Harry Northover to act as a makeshift anti-tank weapon, and was put into production in 1940 following a demonstration to the Prime Minister, Winston Churchill.

The weapon consisted of a hollow metal tube attached to a tripod, with a rudimentary breech at one end. Rounds were fired with the use of black powder ignited by a standard musket percussion cap, and it had an effective range of between 100 and 150 yards. Although it was cheap and easy to manufacture, it did have several problems; it was difficult to move and the No. 76 Special Incendiary Grenades it used as one type of ammunition had a tendency to break inside the breech, damaging the weapon and injuring the crew. Production began in late 1940, and by the beginning of 1943 nearly 19,000 were in service. Like many obsolete Home Guard weapons, it was eventually replaced by other weapons, such as the 2-pounder anti-tank gun.

== Development ==
With the end of the Battle of France and the evacuation of the British Expeditionary Force from the port of Dunkirk between 26 May and 4 June 1940, a German invasion of Great Britain seemed likely. However, the British Army was not well-equipped to defend the country in such an event; in the weeks after the Dunkirk evacuation it could field only twenty-seven divisions. The Army was particularly short of anti-tank guns, 840 of which had been left behind in France, leaving only 167 available in Britain; ammunition was so scarce for the remaining guns that regulations forbade even a single round being used for training purposes.

Given these shortcomings, any modern weapons that were available were allocated to the British Army, and the Home Guard was forced to supplement the meagre amount of outdated weapons and ammunition they had with ad hoc weapons. One such weapon was the Northover Projector, the invention of Major Robert Harry Northover. Northover, an officer in the Home Guard, designed it to be an easily manufactured and cheap anti-tank weapon, costing just under £10 to produce, excluding the required tripod. The Major wrote directly to the Prime Minister, Winston Churchill, with his design and arranged for Churchill to attend a demonstration of the Northover Projector. The Prime Minister approved of the weapon and gave it his personal endorsement, ordering in October 1940 that the weapon be mass-produced on a scale of one for every Home Guard platoon.

== Design ==
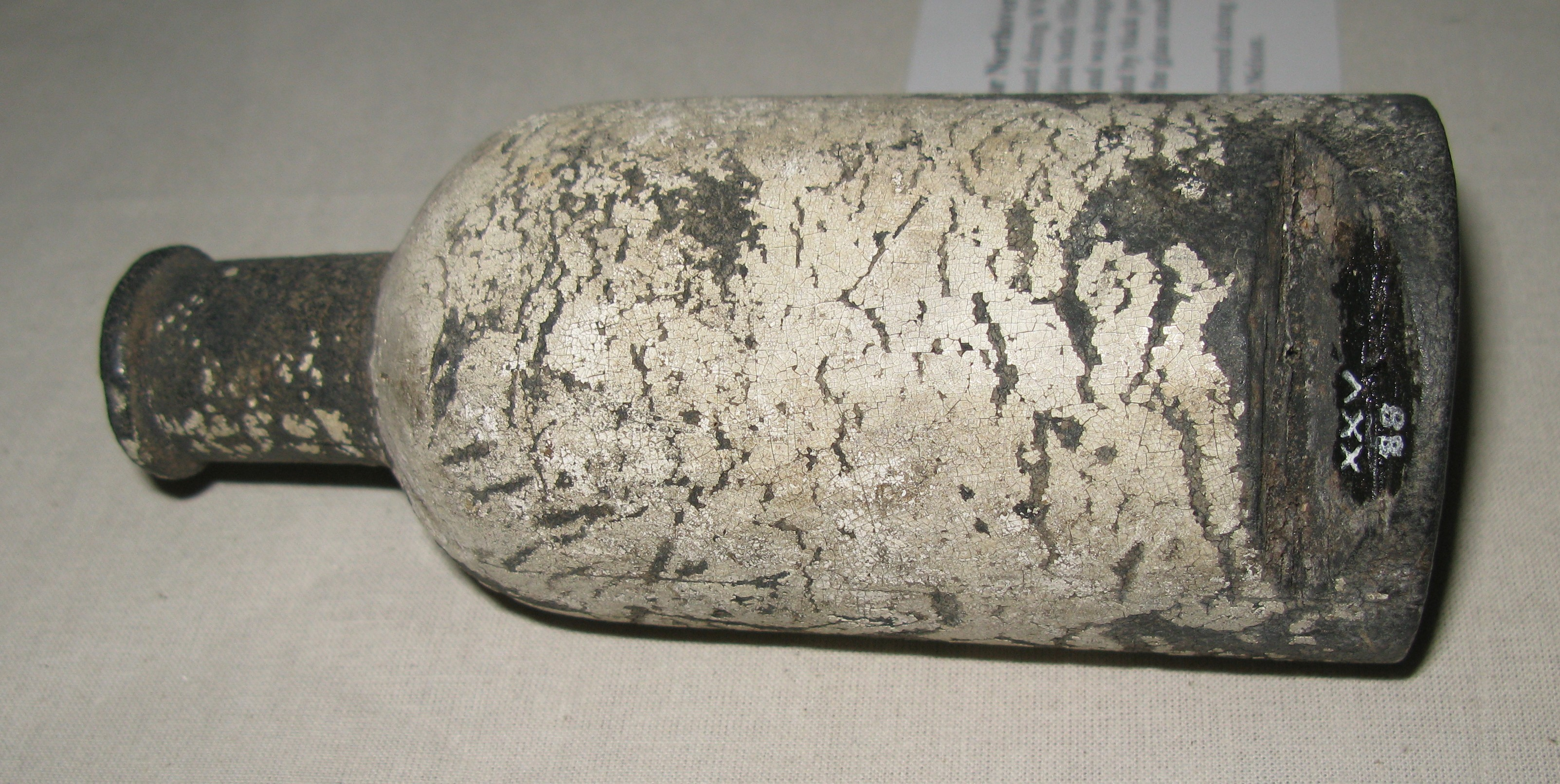
Practice ammunition for the Northover Projector

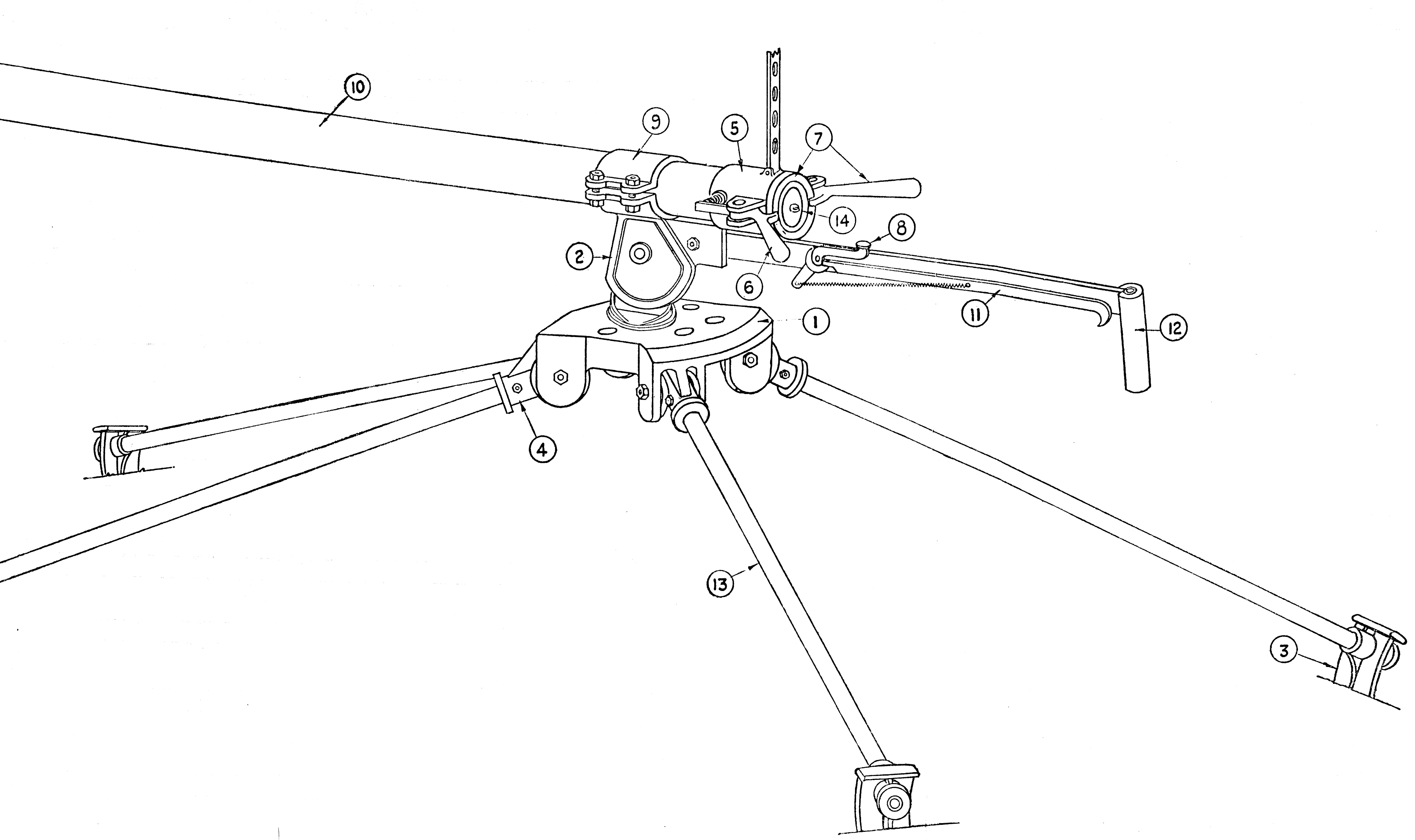
Northover Projector diagram. Key: 1: Base 2: Pivot 3: Spades 4: Leg sockets 5: Breech ring 6: Breech locking lever 7: Breech block handle 8: Firing hammer 9: Barrel clip 10: Barrel 11: Trigger bar 12: Operating handle 13: Legs 14: Primer

The Northover Projector—which was officially labelled the "Projector, 2.5 inch" by the War Office—was formed of a hollow metal tube, resembling a drain pipe, mounted on top of a cast-iron tripod. It weighed approximately 27.2 kilograms. A simple breech was attached to one end of the tube, and rounds were fired from the Projector with a small quantity of black powder ignited by a "top hat" copper cap as used in muzzle loading rifles <Curtis (HBSA)2014>; any recoil from the weapon was absorbed by the legs of the tripod, which were also hollow. It had a maximum range of approximately 300 yards but was accurate only to between 100 and 150 yards Home Guard units often added their own modifications to the weapon, which included mounting it on carriages or even the sidecars of motorcycles. It was served by a crew of three. Ammunition for the weapon consisted of the No. 76 Special Incendiary Grenade, a glass bottle "containing a phosphorus mixture which burst into livid flames, giving off quantities of suffocating smoke upon exposure to the air", as well as normal hand and rifle grenades.

The Projector had a number of defects. It was difficult to move, the tripod had the tendency to damage itself if it was dropped, and its discharge pressure has been described as "feeble." The phosphorus grenades exhibited a number of faults when used in the Projector; they could often explode inside the weapon if too much black powder were added, or fall short if too little were used, or even fail to explode. They could also break inside the barrel when fired which often led to the weapon being damaged and its crew injured. Even when fired properly, the Projector gave off a large cloud of smoke which could take up to a minute to clear and revealed the weapon's position. Bishop argues that its anti-tank abilities would have been 'doubtful' when it fired hand and rifle grenades, although he considers that the phosphorus grenades might have been more successful. To make handling easier, a lighter version of the weapon, the Northover Projector Mk 2 was developed in 1941, but few were produced.

== Operational history ==
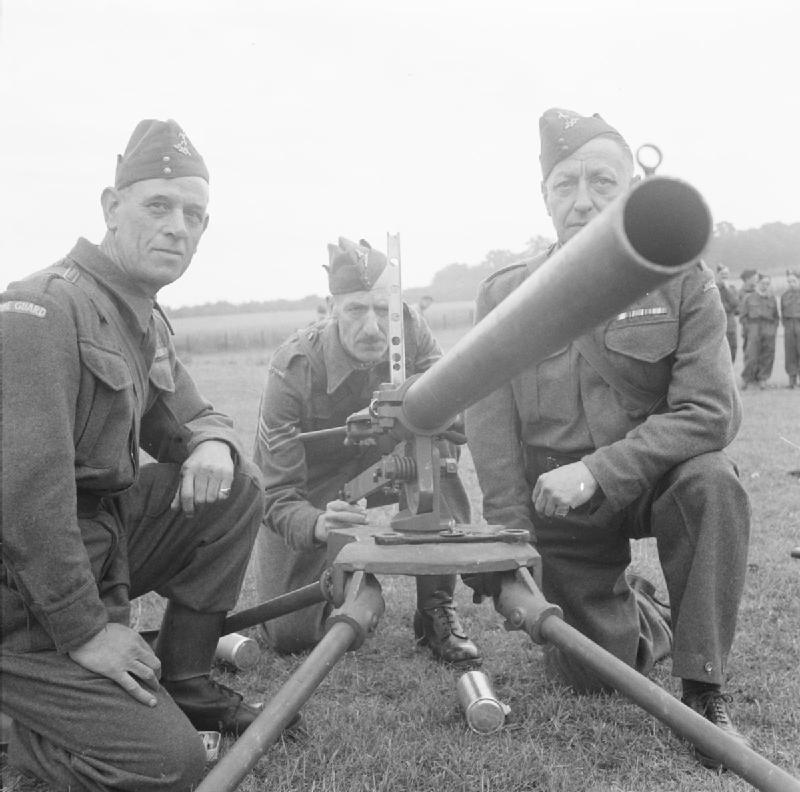
A Home Guard unit in Kent with their Northover Projector.

The Northover Projector was issued to both Home Guard and regular British Army units, and by August, 1941 over 8,000 Northover Projectors were in service. This number had increased to 18,919 by the beginning of 1943.

Initial reactions to the Northover Projector were varied, with a number of Home Guard volunteers uncertain about the weapon's unusual design, and some officers never accepted that it could be useful. However, most Home Guard units came to accept the weapon and have confidence in it, aided by large amounts of what Mackenzie terms "War Office propaganda" which cited the positive qualities of the weapon, such as its simplicity of use, ease of manufacture and low maintenance requirements. It was, as one Home Guard volunteer put it, "something to be accepted gratefully until something better arrived."

Like many of the obsolete weapons designed for the Home Guard, the Northover Projector was only taken out of service when it could be replaced with "marginally less ineffective" weapons provided by the Army, such as the 2-pounder anti-tank gun.

== See also ==
- Ampulomet – (Soviet Union) — similar weapon of World War II
- Smith Gun – (United Kingdom)
- Blacker Bombard – (United Kingdom)

== Bibliography ==
- Bishop, Chris (2002). The Encyclopedia of Weapons of World War II: The Comprehensive Guide to Over 1,500 Weapons Systems, Including Tanks, Small Arms, Warplanes, Artillery, Ships and Submarines. Sterling Publishing Company, Inc. ISBN 978-1-58663-762-0.
- Hogg, Ian. Twentieth-Century Artillery. New York: Barnes & Noble Books, 2000. ISBN 0-7607-1994-2 Pg.143
- Lampe, David (1968). The Last Ditch: Britain's Secret Resistance and the Nazi Invasion Plan. Greenhill Books. ISBN 978-1-85367-730-4.
- Kinard, Jeff (2007). Artillery: An Illustrated History of Its Impact. ABC-CLIO. ISBN 978-1-85109-556-8.
- Longmate, Norman (1974). The Real Dad's Army: The Story of the Home Guard. Hutchinson Library Services.
- Lowry, Bernard; Taylor, Chris; Boulanger, Vincent (2004). British Home Defences 1940-45. Osprey Publishing. ISBN 978-1-84176-767-3.
- Mackenzie, S.P. (1995). The Home Guard: A Military and Political History. Oxford University Press. ISBN 978-0-19-820577-7.

=== Official documents ===
- The Northover Projector. Tank Hunting and Destruction, Military Training Manual No 42, Amendment No. 1, Appendix F. War Office. December 1940.
