= Sticky bomb =

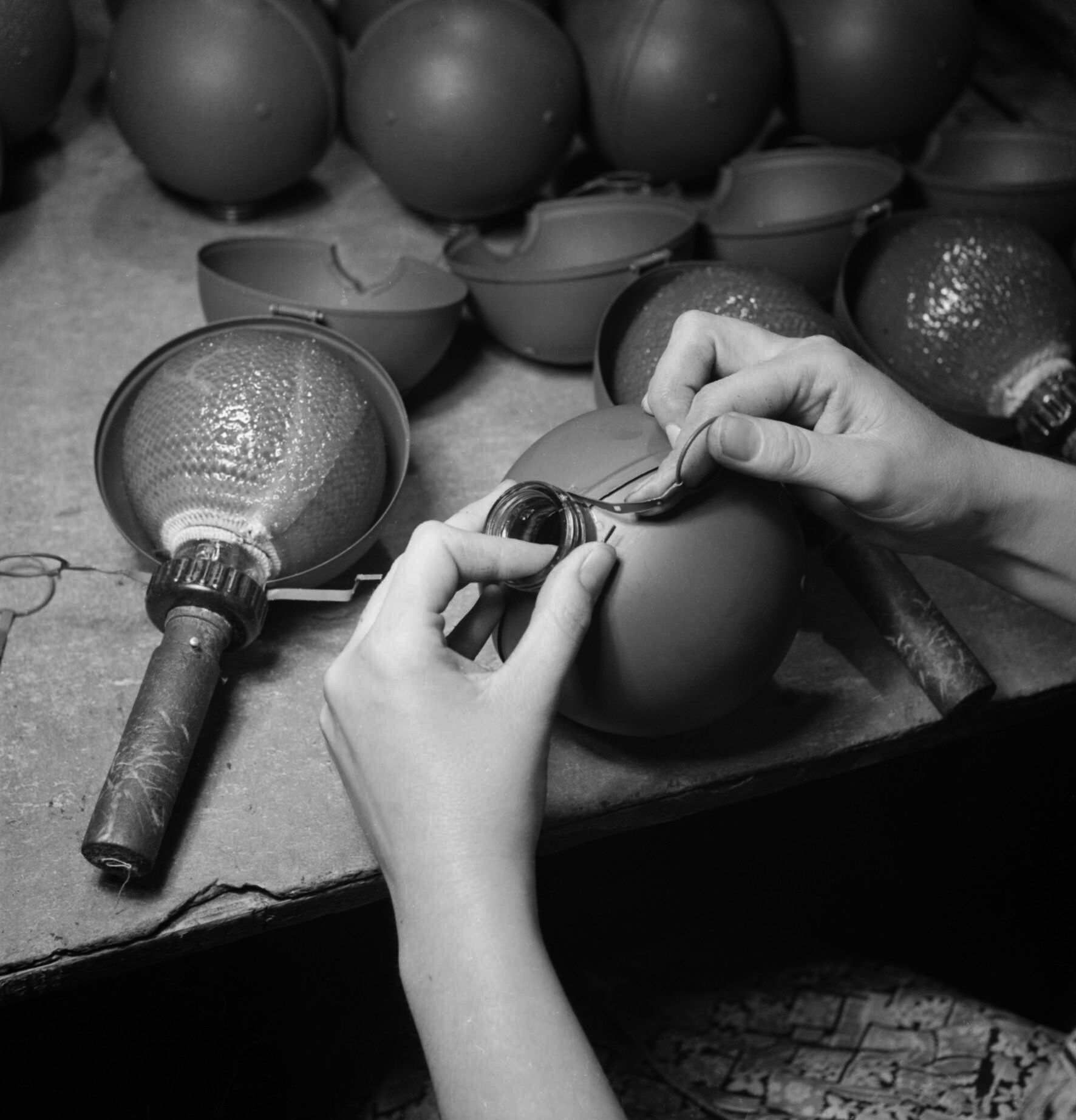
- Sticky bombs being manufactured
- Type: Anti-tank hand grenade
- Place of origin: United Kingdom

Service history
- Used by: United Kingdom; Canada; Australia; France
- Wars: Second World War

Production history
- Designer: Stuart Macrae
- Designed: 1940
- Manufacturer: Kay Brothers Company
- Produced: 1940–1943
- No. built: 2.5 million

Specifications
- Mass: 2.25 lb (1.02 kg)
- Length: 9 in (230 mm)
- Diameter: 4 in (100 mm)
- Filling: Nitroglycerine (Nobel's No. 823 explosive)
- Filling weight: 1.25 lb (0.57 kg)
- Detonation mechanism: Timed, 5 seconds

The "Grenade, Hand, Anti-Tank No. 74", commonly known as the S.T. grenade (Note: Where S.T. stands for Sticky Type.) or simply sticky bomb, was a British hand grenade designed and produced during the Second World War. The grenade was one of a number of ad hoc anti-tank weapons developed for use by the British Army and Home Guard after the loss of many anti-tank guns in France after the Dunkirk evacuation.

The grenade was designed by a team from MIR(c) including Major Millis Jefferis and Stuart Macrae. It consisted of a glass sphere containing an explosive made of nitroglycerin and additives which added stability. When the user pulled a pin on the handle, the casing would fall away and expose the sticky sphere. Pulling another pin would arm the firing mechanism and the user would attempt to attach the grenade to an enemy vehicle. Letting go of the handle would release a lever that would activate a five-second fuse, which would then detonate the nitroglycerin compound.

The grenade had several faults in its design. The Ordnance Board of the War Department did not approve the grenade for use by the British Army, but intervention by the prime minister, Winston Churchill, led to production of the grenade. Between 1940 and 1943, approximately 2.5 million were produced. It was primarily issued to the Home Guard but was also used by British and Commonwealth forces in North Africa. It was used by Allied Forces on the Anzio Beachhead, including the First Special Service Force; as well as by Australian Army units during the New Guinea campaign. The French Resistance were also issued a quantity of the grenades.

== Development ==
In 1938, Maj. Millis Jefferis developed an anti-tank weapon ideal for irregular warfare. It had an explosive charge deform so it had a substantial area of intimate contact with the surface of the target. Upon detonation, the explosion would be focused on a small area capable of rupturing an armoured plate. Sappers call such a device a "poultice" or "squash head" charge. Jefferis enlisted Bauer and Schulman of Cambridge University. They experimented with different lengths of bicycle inner tubes filled with plasticine to represent explosives, fit them with wooden handles, and dipped them in rubber solutions to make them sticky. In experiments, the prototypes proved difficult to aim and only stuck to the metal bins, representing tanks.

With the end of the Battle of France and the Dunkirk evacuation in June, 1940, a German invasion of Great Britain seemed likely. However, the British Army in the weeks after the Dunkirk evacuation could only field 27 divisions. The army had a shortage of anti-tank guns, only 167 were available in Britain; ammunition was so scarce for remaining guns that regulations forbade even single rounds being used for training purposes.

Under the circumstances, Jefferis considered that his idea might be more useful for the British Army and Home Guard. Jefferis was in charge of the MIR(c) department, tasked with developing and delivering weapons for use by guerrilla and resistance groups in occupied Europe. MIR(c) was now charged with development of the sticky bomb, with Stuart Macrae being assigned to design the sticky bomb.

Gordon Norwood, a master printer who recruited Macrae from his former magazine publishing employer, suggested a frangible container was needed to contain an explosive gel. He obtained a 150-Watt light bulb to demonstrate that a spherical glass flask inside a sock of woven wool would be rigid when thrown. Upon contact, the glass would break and the bomb would deform to the required shape. Experiments with glass flasks filled with cold porridge confirmed this was a viable solution.

The grenade needed a delay for the thrower to get clear, so the woollen sock was covered in a sticky substance, ensuring the bomb stayed in place immediately prior to denotation. Having covered the bomb in glue, a non-sticky handle was required. In the handle, a delay fuse was ignited by releasing a sprung lever so that a five-second time delay started as the grenade was thrown, similar to those on a conventional Mills bomb-type hand grenade.

Macrae had a tin of birdlime labelled with a large letter K and an indication that the tin came from Stockport, but with no more clues as to the manufacturer. Macrae got the train to Stockport and found a taxi driver who took him to Kay Brothers Ltd. The company's chief chemist worked on the problem of a suitable adhesive and within weeks the problem was solved to Macrae's satisfaction.

The filling for the bomb was developed by ICI and was nitroglycerin-based with additives to make it more stable and viscous. The glass flask containing the main charge held 1.25 lb (0.57 kg) of this explosive that was described as having the consistency of Vaseline. The adhesive surface was protected by a light metal case which was released by pulling a safety pin. Early models also had a strip of adhesive tape round the neck of the casing. However, there were problems with service regulations that were not written with such an unconventional weapon in mind. The prime minister, Winston Churchill, who was concerned with the state of the country's anti-tank defences, learnt about the grenade and urged its development.

The Ordnance Board of the War Office did not approve the grenade to be used by the army. Churchill still ordered further tests to be conducted in July and that it immediately be put into production. His memo of October 1940 simply read "Sticky bomb. Make one million". Two days later, Anthony Eden, then Secretary of State for War, added a scribbled note to a cabinet minute that recorded the order to go ahead with the bomb:

In spite of top-level pressure, arguments carried on. Trials were disappointing, it was impossible to get the bomb to adhere to any surface that was wet or covered with even the thinnest film of dried mud "a customary condition of tanks" as Major-General Ismay, on 27 June, pointed out.

Churchill was disappointed:

General Ismay, I understand that the trials were not entirely successful and the bomb failed to stick on tanks which were covered in dust and mud. No doubt some more sticky mixture can be devised and Major Jefferis should persevere. Any chortling by officials who have been slothful in pushing this bomb, over the fact that at present it has not succeeded will be viewed with great disfavour by me.

Macrae, Ismay and Churchill all saw fit to record these arguments over the technical issue of stickiness. As Eden had pointed out, there was a lot at stake. The British infantry and Home Guard had little with which to fight against tanks and to any who had witnessed trials of Molotov cocktails and SIP grenades it was evident they could do little to a modern tank other than provide a blinding pall of smoke. What was needed was a hand weapon to deliver a coup de grâce by punching through the armoured plate. The sticky bomb could do this and little else was available.

In his memoirs, Ismay recalled that he never solved the puzzle of how to convey his genuine concerns to the right people. A thrown sticky bomb simply would not reliably stick to a vertical surface; the bomb would stick if it was thrown onto the top of a tank, where the plates were more or less horizontal – and thinner – but this reduced the throwing range to 20 yd (18 m) at most, getting that close would only be possible in an ambush or street fighting.

Churchill considered any obstruction, however well-meaning, as lacking in imagination. In the event of invasion, he foresaw a desperate fight to the last and after the war, he wrote about how he envisaged the use of the sticky bomb, "We had the picture in mind that devoted soldiers or civilians would run close up to the tank and even thrust the bomb upon it, though its explosion cost them their lives. There were undoubtedly many who would have done it". He later recorded how he intended to use the slogan "You can always take one with you".

Arguments rumbled on and there were delays. Early versions of the sticky bomb were prone to leaks as well as breakage in transport. There were concerns over the explosive charge, pure nitroglycerin is susceptible to the slightest knock, but the mixture developed by ICI proved to be safe even if it should get into the hinges of the storage boxes. By December 1940, fewer than 66,000 had been produced and the rate of production was disappointing at five to ten thousand per week. It was suggested the original order of one million be reduced to 200,000. Minor improvements were made, the most significant was to replace the glass flask with plastic. Finally, after passing all the required tests, the sticky bomb – now the No. 74 grenade Mk II – was accepted by the Ordnance Board; it was put into full-scale production, and became service issue.

On 14 May 1941, Lieutenant-General Sir Ian Jacob reflected:

The most extraordinary feature of the whole business, however, was the fact that the Secretary of State for War, in a minute addressed to the Prime Minister on 25 November 1940, said that the Director of Artillery and the Ordnance Board had only just been able to obtain from ICI the details of the explosive contained in the bomb. Seeing that the bomb was demonstrated in June 1940, this statement can hardly hold water. The War Office seems to be to blame in that, up to the end of April 1941, no sticky bombs had been issued to any unit, nor had any dummies been provided for training. In view of our acute shortage of anti-tank weapons, the whole story is discreditable.

Between 1940 and 1943, approximately 2.5 million were produced.

== Design ==
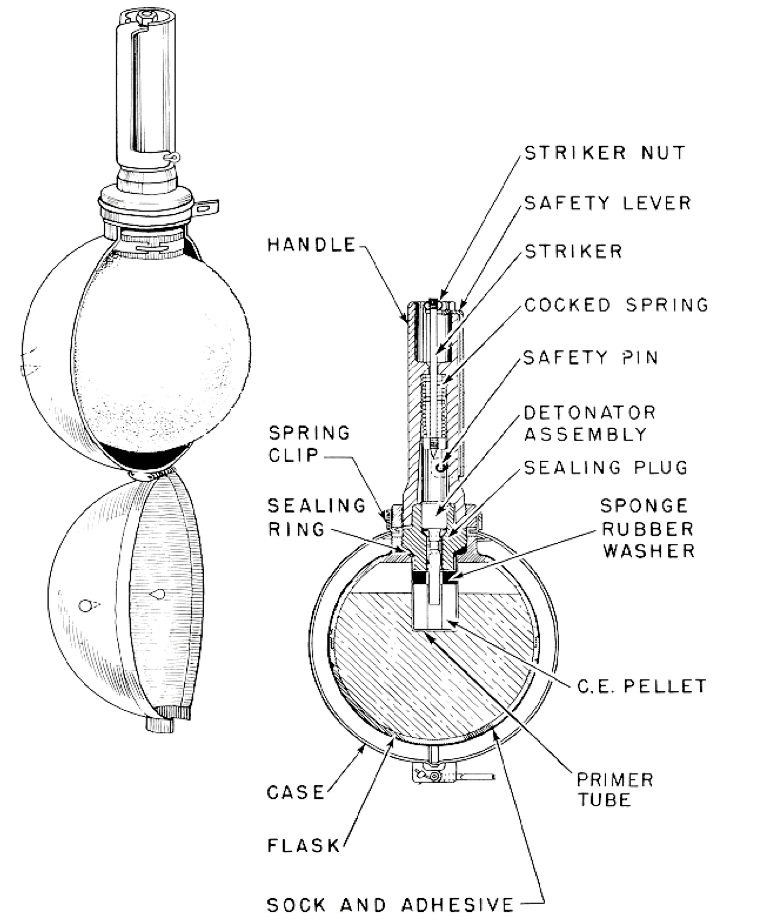
Sticky bomb diagram. British explosive ordnance

The grenade consisted of a glass sphere containing 1.25 lb (0.57 kg) of semi-liquid nitroglycerin, covered in stockinette (a kind of fabric) and coated with birdlime. A casing made out of thin sheet-metal and formed of two halves was placed around the sphere and held in place by a wooden handle, inside which was a five-second fuse. The handle also contained two pins and a lever, which were pulled out to make the casing fall away and activate the firing mechanism. The user would run up to the tank and stick the grenade to its hull, using as much force as possible to break the sphere and spread the nitroglycerin onto the hull in a thick paste. The lever would be released, and the fuse activated, and the grenade would then detonate.

The grenade did possess several problems with its design. Users were urged to actually run up to the tank and place it by hand, rather than throw it, thus the adhesive could very easily stick to their uniform in the process; the user would then be placed in the unenviable situation of attempting to pry the grenade loose whilst still holding onto the lever. It was also discovered that as time passed the nitroglycerin began to deteriorate and become unstable, which made it even more difficult to use. As the grenade was a short-range weapon, users were trained to hide in a trench or other place of concealment until the tank went past them, and then to stick the grenade to the rear of the tank, where its armour was thinnest. Users were relatively safe from a few yards away, as long as they were not in line with the handle when it detonated. The Mark II design used a plastic casing instead of glass, and a detonator instead of a cap.

== Operational use ==
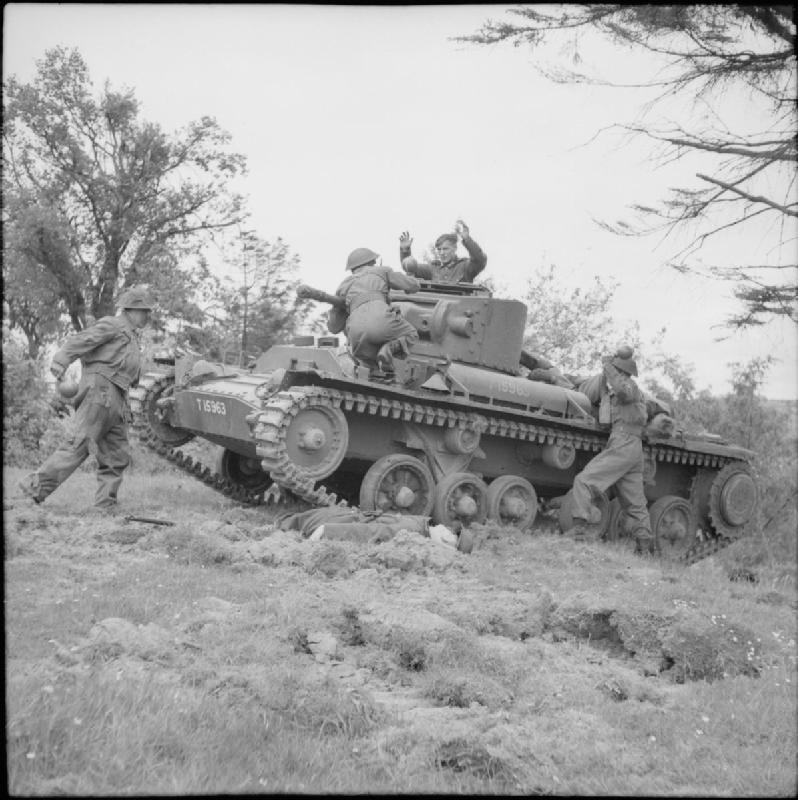
Home Guard volunteers simulate an attack on a Valentine tank wielding Sticky bombs in 1943.

"It was while practising that a H[ome]G[uard] bomber got his stick [sic] bomb stuck to his trouser leg and couldn't shift it. A quick thinking mate whipped the trousers off and got rid of them and the bomb. After the following explosion the trousers were in a bit of a mess though I think they were a bit of a mess prior to the explosion."

— Home Guard member Bill Miles recounting the dangers of training with the Sticky Bomb

According to a War Office training pamphlet dated 29 August 1940, the sticky bomb should be regarded as a portable demolition device which can be "quickly and easily applied". The sticky bomb was thought to be effective against armour of up to one inch (25 mm) thickness and was suitable for use against "baby" tanks, armoured cars and the vulnerable points on medium and heavy tanks. It could be dropped from an upstairs window or applied in place by hand, with sufficient force to break the glass creating a greater area of contact. It could also be placed first and then pulled out by means of a length of string.

"A section of the Royal Durban Light Infantry used these bombs to great effect in what amounted to a battle between men and tanks. The South Africans, armed only with a Bren-gun, a Spandau-gun (Note: Spandau was used to refer to the German MG34 and later MG42 machine guns), a tommy-gun, an anti-tank rifle, sticky bombs, and hand grenades, took on an enemy formation consisting of 28 tanks which was advancing in "W" formation against the position that the section was holding. The South Africans waited until the leading tank was 10 paces away and then pelted it with sticky bombs, setting fire to it and forcing out its crew, who were all shot down. Four tanks were dealt with in this fashion and 28 Germans were killed." Men Versus Tanks – The Times.

Macrae credits the Australian Army with developing the technique of applying a sticky bomb directly onto a tank instead of throwing it from a relatively safe distance. Since the bomb used a blast effect, it was safe to do this and walk away provided only that the bomb's handle was pointing away from the bomber – the handle would be shot away from the explosion "like a bullet." Macrae gives no date for the development of this tactic. Macrae confirmed that placing the bomb rather than throwing it gives better adhesion and allows thicker plates to be penetrated.

By July 1941, 215,000 sticky bombs had been produced. Of these, nearly 90,000 had been sent abroad to North and South Africa, the Middle East and to Greece where they did useful service. The remainder were stored at Ordnance Depots or distributed to army and Home Guard units.

The grenade was first issued in 1940 to Home Guard units, who appeared to have taken a liking to it despite its flaws. Although the Ordnance Board had not approved the grenade to be used by regular army units, a quantity were provided for training purposes. However, a number of sticky bombs did find their way to British and Commonwealth units participating in the campaign in North Africa and were used as anti-tank weapons. During the Afrika Korps advance towards the town of Thala in February 1943, they accounted for six German tanks.

They were also issued to units of the Australian Army, who used them during the Battle of Wau and the Battle of Milne Bay. They were used by various allied units on the Anzio Beachhead, namely the First Special Service Force, who obtained them from the British. A large number were also supplied to the French Resistance.

== Recognition ==
In 1947, the Royal Commission on Awards to Inventors considered claims from Macrae and from the managing director of Kay Brothers. Macrae's legal representative was Edward Terrell – himself a wartime inventor. At the time the Crown opposed granting an award; when Macrae was asked what elements of the sticky bomb he claimed to have invented, he replied "I am claiming no invention I merely claim the development of the bomb, which was my job." However, in 1951, the commission recommended that Macrae should receive an ex-gratia payment of £500 (equivalent to £17,900 in 2024) and Norwood received £250 (equivalent to £9,000 in 2024) for his contribution.

== Legacy ==
In 1962, a buried cache of 50 sticky bombs was discovered close to a railway line and housing area at Aldershot Garrison. Two members of the Royal Army Ordnance Corps were awarded the George Medal for safely disposing of grenades, which after 20 years were stuck together and had become extremely unstable and dangerous.

== Users ==
Users of the grenade included:

- Australia
- Canada
- Free French Forces
- United Kingdom

== See also ==
- British anti-invasion preparations of World War II
- No. 73 grenade
- No. 76 special incendiary grenade
- Blacker Bombard
- Smith Gun
- Northover Projector
- PIAT

== Bibliography ==
- British Explosive Ordnance (Report). Ordnance Pamphlet. Department of the Navy, Ordnance Systems Command. 10 June 1946. OCLC 51810278. NAVORD OP 1665.
- Bradley, Phillip (2008). The Battle for Wau: New Guinea's Frontline, 1942–1943. Cambridge University Press. ISBN 978-0-521-89681-8.
- Brune, Peter (1998). The Spell Broken: Exploding the Myth of Japanese Invincibility: Milne Bay to Buna-Sanananda 1942–43. Allen & Unwin. ISBN 1-86448-693-7.
- Bull, Stephen; Dennis, Peter; Delf, Brian; Chappell, Mike; Windrow, Martin (2004). World War II Infantry Tactics. Osprey. ISBN 1-84176-663-1.
- "CAB 120/372 – Anti-tank weapons: "sticky" bombs". The Catalogue. The National Archives.
- Churchill, Winston (1949). Their Finest Hour. The Second World War. Vol. II. ISBN 978-0-14-144172-6.
- French, David (2000). Raising Churchill's Army: The British Army and the War against Germany 1919–1945. Oxford University Press. ISBN 978-0-19-820641-5.
- Hogg, Ian (1995). Tank Killers: Anti-Tank Warfare by Men and Machines. Pan Macmillan. ISBN 0-330-35316-0.
- Ismay, Hastings (1960). The Memoirs of General Lord Ismay. New York: Viking Press. ISBN 978-0-8371-6280-5.
- Lampe, David (1968). The Last Ditch: Britain's Secret Resistance and the Nazi Invasion Plan. Greenhill Books. ISBN 978-1-85367-730-4.
- Mackenzie, S. P. (1995). The Home Guard: A Military and Political History. Oxford University Press. ISBN 0-19-820577-5.
- Macrae, Stuart (1971). Winston Churchill's Toyshop. Roundwood. ISBN 978-0-900093-22-7.
- Niven, David (1981). Go Slowly Come Back Quickly. Book Club Associates. ISBN 978-0-241-10690-7.
- Postan, M. M.; Hay, D.; Scott, J. D. (1964). Design and Development of Weapons: Studies in Government and Industrial Organisation. History of the Second World War. Stationery Office Books. ISBN 978-0-11-630089-8.
- "'Sticky Bomb' Claim – Treasury Opposed to Award". Manchester Guardian. 23 May 1947. page 3 column C.
- "Sticky Bomb Awards". Manchester Guardian. 6 March 1951. p. 8 column C.
- "Sticky Bomb Idea 'Put on Plate'". Manchester Guardian. 21 February 1951. p. 6 column C.
- The S. T. Grenade. Tank Hunting and Destruction, Military Training Manual No 42, Appendix C. War Office. 1940.
- "T 166/15 Royal Commission on Awards to Inventors – Macrae. Hearing Monday 26 February 1951". The Catalogue. The National Archives.
- Watson, Bruce (2007). Exit Rommel: The Tunisian Campaign, 1942–43. Stackpole Books. ISBN 978-0-8117-3381-6.
- Weeks, John (1975). Men Against Tanks: A History of Anti-Tank Warfare. David & Charles. ISBN 0-7153-6909-1.
- "WO 185/1. Anti-tank measures Sticky Bomb adoption and production". The Catalogue. The National Archives.
