= Stuart Macrae (inventor) =

English soldier and inventor

Robert Stuart Macrae
- Military career
- Allegiance: United Kingdom
- Branch: British Army
- Service years: 1939–1955
- Rank: Colonel
- Conflicts: Second World War

Colonel Robert Stuart Macrae TD was an inventor best known for his work at MD1 during the Second World War, his best known invention being the sticky bomb. He is also known for the following. Ministry of Defence 1 MD1 was located at "The Firs", Whitchurch.

Also known as "Winston Churchill's Toyshop", this was a British weapon research and development organisation of the Second World War. Many of these inventions would be used by the SOE and Auxiliary Units. The two key figures were Major Millis Jefferis and Stuart Macrae.

MD1 began in the "Military Intelligence Research" (MIR). The MIR was a department of the War Office set up in 1939 under Lt-Col Joe Holland, RE. Holland was the General Staff Officer Grade 1 (GSO1) and brought in Jefferis, also a sapper (RE) and explosives expert, as GSO2 to head MIR(c) a division of MIR that was to develop weapons for irregular warfare. Needing special magnets, Jefferis brought in Macrae initially as an outside contractor but later to be brought into uniform and serve as his deputy.

MIR(c) started in a room at the War Office, Macrae secured offices and workshop space at IBC, owners of Radio Normandie, in London. Following an air raid, a large country house "The Firs", (fortunately the second home of a patriotic Major) was requisitioned and the design and workshops relocated there, in Whitchurch near Aylesbury in Buckinghamshire close to the Prime Minister at Chequers. There they developed and to some extent produced munitions. During the phoney war, MIR(c) was engaged in developing the floating mine required for Churchill's planned Operation Royal Marine which aimed to disrupt German shipping in their inland waterways by dropping these mines into the river at Strasbourg. Churchill lobbied for recognition of Jefferis, suggesting promotion. When MIR was combined with other activities to form the Special Operations Executive, MIR(C) instead in November 1940 became a department in the Ministry of Defence; effectively under the wing the Prime Minister, Churchill who was the Minister of Defence.

As First Lord of the Treasury as well, Churchill could provide funds. Churchill, Professor Lindemann and General Ismay (Churchill's chief scientific and military advisors respectively) would protect MD1 from the Ministry of Supply and the Ordnance Board whose areas they encroached on. The Ministry of Supply carried out the administration but the War Cabinet was in control. Jefferis was promoted to Lt-Col and Macrae to Major.

Other staff at MD1 included Stewart Blacker who was brought in after his privately invented Blacker Bombard was taken on for official development. With the end of the war and the removal of Churchill from office, MD1 was taken over by the Ministry of Supply and the Weapons research establishment at Fort Haldane with the result that it was disbanded. Macrae felt this was an act of revenge by those who had opposed it and the Professor. Production machinery went to the Rocket Propulsion Establishment at Westcott, effectively for scrapping. Jefferis received an appointment to the Pakistan Army.https://www.staybehinds.com/origins-md1-winston-churchills-toyshop

Macrae was the author of Winston Churchill's Toyshop, a memoir detailing his experiences at MD1.

== Early career ==
Macrae had been a trainee engineer and late in the First World War worked on a device for dropping grenades as an early form of cluster bomb. The war ended before the device was used or he received any commission for his work.

Macrae was an editor of Armchair Science magazine during the period leading up to the Second World War. He was approached by Millis Jefferis who was after strong magnets for a secret explosive project. Already security cleared from his previous work, Macrae was able to join in the project.

== Second World War ==
Macrae was called up as a second lieutenant on the Special List of the Territorial Army on 1 September 1939. with the effect that he had to give up editing Armchair Science and a gardening magazine at the same publisher.

One of Macrae's first weapons inventions was a limpet mine. The mine was developed by Macrae and Cecil Vandepeer Clarke in 1939 using improvised development techniques.

Macrae was the administrator of MD1, but also able to continue to be involved in developing weapons and devices.

By the end of the war he was a war substantive lieutenant colonel. His promotion to full colonel, as a result of MD1 being upgraded to a Grade A Establishment, was halted by the end of the war. He remained in the TA after the war, transferring to the Royal Electrical and Mechanical Engineers (REME) as a substantive major on 9 October 1947 (with seniority from 6 October 1942).

== Later career ==
In 1947, Macrae applied to the Royal Commission on Awards to Inventors with regards to his part in the development of the Sticky Bomb. His application was actively opposed on the basis that he was provided with the concept "on a plate" – the basic concept had been devised by Millis Jefferis. Macrae did not contradict this, but emphasised his part in the development of the weapon. He was awarded £500 [equivalent to £16,900 in 2025.] for his contribution. He was promoted to substantive lieutenant colonel on 1 July 1950, and awarded the Territorial Efficiency Decoration, with clasp on 15 June 1951.

In 1953, Macrae was questioned about his possession of certain documents originating from his time at MD1. Matters came to light as he again applied to the Royal Commission on Awards to Inventors for his wartime work on a variety of gadgets. Some of the documents were secret or top secret. He explained that he had taken the papers home for safe keeping when The Firs closed in 1947 because no one else would take them away and they were left lying on the workshop floor and he was soon exonerated of any wrongdoing. As the hearing progressed, Major-General J. F. C. Holland, Major-General Sir Colin Gubbins gave evidence to the commission explaining the usefulness of the unorthodox weapons. Macrae shared a number of awards from the Royal Commission on Awards to Inventors: £600 [equivalent to £15,000 in 2025] jointly for the L-delay Switch; £400 [£9,700] for the limpet mine, £300 [£7,300] for an air-pressure switch and £200 [£4,900] for igniters, detonators and signal flashes. He retired from army service on 1 January 1955, and was granted the honorary rank of colonel.

Between 1956 and 1970, Macrae took out a number of patents relating to reflecting road studs.

In 1971, Macrae published the book "Winston Churchill's Toyshop," detailing his work at MD1, one of the most famous and successful of all the British secret "back rooms" of World War II. Macrae's book traces his work at the "toyshop," from the limpet mine, a delayed action mine, to the sticky bomb and the Blacker Bombard, to giant, bridge-carrying assault tanks (the Great Eastern). The workshop operated initially out of a tiny basement workshop and later from a country mansion. It produced an astonishing variety of ingenious and secret weapons that destroyed innumerable German tanks, aircraft and ships.

Macrae's first wife Mary died at the family home in Beacon Way, Banstead on 24 May 1973. The Macraes had three children, David, John and Vivien.

In 1977, Macrae was engaged to be married to Anne Vivien Hall. The following year, Macrae and his new wife attended a luncheon party given by Queen Elizabeth II on the Royal Yacht Britannia.
