= Millis Jefferis =

British Army general

Major-General Sir Millis Jefferis KBE MC
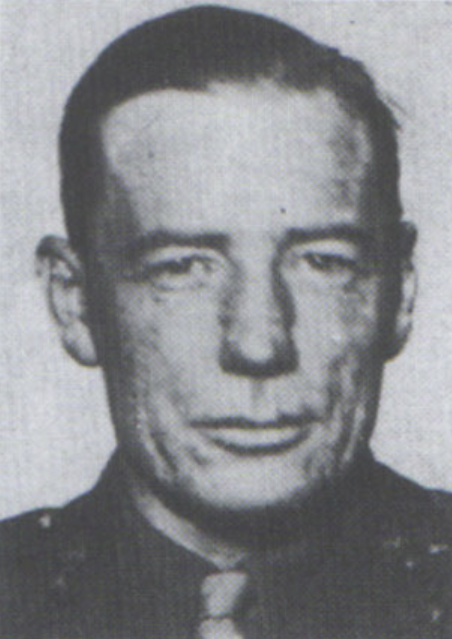
- Born: 9 January 1899; Merstham, Surrey
- Died: 5 September 1963 (aged 64); Porthgwarra, Cornwall
- Military career
- Allegiance: United Kingdom
- Branch: British Army; British Indian Army
- Service years: 1918–1953
- Rank: Major-General
- Service number: 15844
- Unit: Royal Engineers
- Conflicts: World War I Waziristan Campaign; Second World War
- Awards: Knight Commander of the Order of the British Empire; Commander of the Order of the British Empire; Military Cross; Mentioned in dispatches Norwegian War Cross with sword
- Other work: Deputy Engineer-Chief India; Engineer-in-Chief Pakistan; Chief superintendent of the Military Engineering Experimental Establishment

Major-General Sir Millis Rowland Jefferis KBE MC (9 January 1899 – 5 September 1963) was a British military officer who founded a special unit of the British Ministry of Supply which developed unusual weapons during the Second World War.

== Early career ==
Born at Merstham, Surrey on 9 January 1899, Jefferis was educated at Tonbridge School and Royal Military Academy, Woolwich. From Woolwich he was commissioned into the Royal Engineers on 6 June 1918, during the final months of World War I, and after passing through the School of Military Engineering at Chatham, he was posted to the First Field Squadron RE in the British Army of the Rhine (BAOR).

In 1920 he went to India and served with the Queen's Own Madras Sappers and Miners in the Third Field Troop at Sialkot. In 1922 he went into the Works Services in India as garrison engineer at Kohat and then at Khaisora which is today in Pakistan. He saw active service in the Waziristan Campaign where his main responsibility was the construction of roads. On 12 June 1923 he was awarded the Military Cross, the citation read:

The War Office, 12th June, 1923.

His Majesty the KING has been graciously pleased to approve of the undermentioned rewards for distinguished service in the Field with the Razmak Force: —

Awarded the Distinguished Service Order.

Maj. Leslie Charles Bertram Deed, R.E.

Awarded the Military Cross.

Lt. Millis Rowland Jefferis, R.E.

For gallantry and devotion to duty whilst reconnoitring ahead of the road construction parties on the Isha-Razmak road between May and December 1922, and in the supervision of the work. The satisfactory progress of the road was due in great measure to their efforts and disregard of danger.

He then returned to Chatham and went to Cambridge University. In 1925, he returned to India and was placed on special duty at Kabul in the foreign and political department. In 1926 he returned to Nowshera as garrison engineer and spent several years in Works Services at Peshawar where he made full use of this engineering genius designing bridges. Also in 1925, he married Ruth Carolyne, daughter of G. E. Wakefield. They had three sons, two of whom went on to serve in the Royal Engineers. On 1 June 1929, Jefferis was promoted to captain.

In 1934 he was posted to the Royal Bombay Sappers and Miners at Kirkee as a company commander in the training battalion. He returned to Britain in 1936 and joined the Twenty-third Field Company at Aldershot. Moving to the First Field Squadron, he stayed at Aldershot while the unit was being mechanised. While at Aldershot, Jefferis successfully raced horses and played squash competitively. He was promoted major on 6 June 1938, and on 4 April 1939 he was appointed a General Staff Officer, Grade 2 (GSO2).

== Second World War ==
=== Norway ===
In 1940, after World War II had begun, Jefferis was sent to Norway. He returned to give a personal account of his activities to Prime Minister Winston Churchill, who used his report to brief the War Cabinet:

The Prime Minister gave the War Cabinet an account of the report which had been made personally to him by Major Jefferis. Major Jefferis had been sent out to Andalsnes with instructions to blow up the Western railway in Central Norway. He had accordingly gone down the railway line and joined Brigadier Morgan’s Brigade; but the Norwegians had categorically refused to allow him to carry out any demolitions. He had been present when Morgan’s Brigade had been engaged by the enemy. The Germans had attacked with artillery, tanks and armoured cars, which our troops had been without. Far more destructive of morale, however, had been the low-flying attacks with bombs and machine guns. Although the casualties had not been so great as from shell fire, the moral effect of seeing the aircraft coming, of being unable to take cover, of being able to observe the bomb dropping, and of the terrific explosion, had been overwhelming.

Jefferis had eventually found himself with the Germans behind him. Picking up a sergeant and two privates, he had succeeded in making his way back to Andalsnes; and on the way he had managed to blow up the girders of two bridges on the German side. He estimated that it would take some three weeks to repair these. At Andalsenes the conditions of air attack had been such as to make it quite impossible to walk down to the jetty during daylight hours. He had spent a day in a sloop in the harbour at which thirty bombs had been aimed. None had hit, but the immunity of a ship under such conditions could only be, in Major Jefferis’s opinion, a matter of time, and he calculated that his life would probably not be more than three days.

The general conclusion which he (the Prime Minister) drew from Major Jefferis’s account was that it was quite impossible for land forces to withstand complete air superiority of the kind which the Germans had enjoyed in Norway. This made it all the more imperative to the success of our operations at Narvik that we should establish air bases in that area, not only for fighters, but also for bombers.

For his service in Norway, Jefferis was awarded the Norwegian War Cross with sword, and mentioned in dispatches for his efforts in the withdrawal from Lillehammer.

=== MD1 ===
Jefferis started working on sabotage devices for the "Military Intelligence Research" (MIR). When MIR was combined with other hush-hush elements to form the SOE, Jefferis' unit was not included and it instead became a department in the Ministry of Defence; the only unit of the Minister of Defence (The Prime Minister, Winston Churchill) and was known as "MD1", ultimately based in a house called "The Firs" in Whitchurch near Aylesbury in Buckinghamshire England.

The unit was responsible for the design, development and production of a number of unique special forces and regular munitions during the Second World War. It gained the nickname "Winston Churchill's toyshop".

Jefferis was an explosives expert and engineer. He was assisted in the management of MD1 by an assistant – Major Stuart Macrae, whose book Winston Churchill's Toyshop, is still one of the few published works on this unique unit.

Over the period of the Second World War, MD1 was responsible for the introduction into service of a total of 26 different devices.

Their designs include the PIAT, the Sticky bomb and one of the first magnetic Limpet naval mines.

Through the application of the Squash head and HEAT technology they had a role in the development and production of Lt-Col Stewart Blacker's Blacker Bombard, the PIAT (Blacker's smaller version of the bombard) matched to a hollow charge warhead, Hedgehog (effectively an adaption of the Bombard spigot mortar principle working with the Navy's Directorate of Miscellaneous Weapons Development) and tank variants including the AVRE with its "Flying Dustbin" 230mm Petard spigot mortar, and a bridge-laying tank.

Jefferis developed the idea of the squash head further. His most ambitious project was a bomb designed to sink capital ships, his ideas were put forward by himself and Lord Cherwell in 1944 and coincided with the Admiralty's interest in developing a homing bomb for use against the Japanese. The development of this weapon was supported by the Air Staff and MAP who allocated it a higher priority that any other anti-capital ship weapon. When the war ended, development of the 'Cherwell-Jefferis' bomb was continued under the code names Journey's End and Blue Boar.

Prime Minister Churchill became acquainted with then Jefferis in 1940 and regarded him as a "singularly capable and forceful man." He recommended a promotion to lieutenant colonel so that Jefferis would have more authority. Jefferis received substantive promotion to this rank on 10 February 1944.

Jefferis' development of the hollow charge led ultimately to the same design being used, after refinement by James Chadwick, in the core of the plutonium bomb dropped on Nagasaki.

Jefferis was promoted to Knight Commander of the Order of the British Empire (KBE) by Churchill in the 1945 Prime Minister's Resignation Honours, having previously been appointed a Commander of the Order (CBE). He was promoted to acting major general on 15 May 1945, and substantive colonel on 14 July 1945. He left the Ministry of Supply on 20 November 1945, reverting to the temporary rank of brigadier.

== Later career ==
In 1945, Jefferis became deputy Engineer-in-Chief in India and 1947 he became Engineer-in-Chief in Pakistan, holding the temporary rank of major general. He was promoted to substantive brigadier on 1 November 1947, and returned to England on 2 January 1950 to become Chief Superintendent of the Military Engineering Experimental Establishment, reverting to the rank of brigadier on 8 March 1950. He was made ADC to the King on 24 May 1951 and held that appointment until he retired on 18 August 1953, on his retirement he was granted the honorary rank of major-general. As an ADC, Jefferis took part in George VI's funeral, and Queen Elizabeth II's Coronation Procession. He died on 5 September 1963.

== Ocean racing ==
Jefferis had a passion for ocean racing. In 1938, he built a 7-ton yacht at Aldershot called Prelude with another Royal Engineer officer and they sailed successfully both before and after the war.

== Bibliography ==
- Thomson, George; William Farren (1958). "Fredrick Alexander Lindemann, Viscount Cherwell". Biographical Memoirs of Fellows of the Royal Society, Volume 4. London: Royal Society.
- "Stuart Macrae's "Toy Box"". The Mills Grenade Collectors site.
- Macrae, Stuart (1971). Winston Churchill's Toyshop. Roundwood Press. ISBN 0-900093-22-6.
- Twigge, Stephen Robert (1992). The Early Development of Guided Weapons in the United Kingdom, 1940–1960. Taylor & Francis. ISBN 978-3-7186-5297-6.
- Milton, Giles (2017). Churchill's Ministry of Ungentlemanly Warfare. John Murray. ISBN 978-1-444-79898-2.
- "Sir Millis Jefferis (obituary)". The Times. 7 September 1963. p. 10 column E.
