= Phillip Bradley =

Australian military historian

- Born: 18 May 1955 (age 71); Sydney
- Known for: Military historian

Phillip Bradley (born 18 May 1955) is an Australian military historian who has written nine books as well as numerous articles for Wartime and After the Battle magazine. He has been described as "One of the finest chroniclers of the Australian Army's role in the New Guinea campaign".

Bradley has travelled many Australian battlefields, including sites in Papua New Guinea, Turkey and France.

== Published works ==
=== Books ===
- — (2004). On Shaggy Ridge: The Australian Seventh Division in the Ramu Valley from Kaiapit to the Finisterres. South Melbourne: Oxford University Press. ISBN 0195551001.
- — (2008). The Battle for Wau: New Guinea's Frontline 1942–1943. Cambridge: Cambridge University Press. ISBN 9780521896818.
- — (2010). To Salamaua. Cambridge: Cambridge University Press. ISBN 9780521763905.
- — (2010). Wau 1942–43. Canberra: Army History Unit. ISBN 9780980777406.
- — (2012). Hell's Battlefield: The Australians in New Guinea in World War II. Crows Nest, New South Wales: Allen & Unwin. ISBN 9781742372709.
- Bean, Charles (2014). Bradley, Phillip (ed.). Charles Bean's Gallipoli Illustrated. Crows Nest, New South Wales: Allen & Unwin. ISBN 9781742371238.
- — (2016). Australian Light Horse: The Campaign in the Middle East, 1916-1918. Crows Nest, New South Wales: Allen & Unwin. ISBN 9781760111892.
- — (2019). D-Day New Guinea: the extraordinary story of the battle for Lae and the greatest combined airborne and amphibious operation of the Pacific War (1st ed.). St Leonards, New South Wales: Allen & Unwin. ISBN 9781760632588.
- — (2021). Salamaua 1943. Canberra: Army History Unit. ISBN 9781922387752.
- — (2021). The Battle for Shaggy Ridge (1st ed.). Crows Nest, New South Wales: Allen & Unwin. ISBN 9781760878672.

=== Selected articles ===
- "Shaggy Ridge" (After the Battle, No 103).
- "It Happened Here – Bravery in New Guinea" (After the Battle, No 113).
- "Tragedy at Jackson's Strip" (Wartime, 2003, No 23).
- "Assault on the Pimple" (Wartime, 2004, No 28).
- "The Last Stand at Wandumi" (Wartime, 2005, No 29).
- "'Slugger'" (Wartime, 2006, No 36).
- "The Kokoda Trail" (After the Battle, 2007, No 137).
- "The Battle for Saint-Lo" (After the Battle, 2007, No 138).
- "The Battle for Buna" (After the Battle, 2013, No 162).

== Grants ==
Bradley has received a number of grants from the Australian Army History Unit, these include:

- 2010–11 – The Capture of Lae: September 1943
- 2009–10 – The Capture of Lae: September 1943
- 2008–09 – The Salamaua Campaign: March–September 1943
- 2007–08 – The Salamaua Campaign: March–September 1943
- 2006–07 – The Wau Campaign: March 1942 – February 1943
- 2005–06 – The Wau Campaign, March 1942 – February 1943
