= MD1 (military R&D organisation) =

English-based weapon research organisation

Ministry of Defence 1 (MD1), also known as "Churchill's Toyshop", was a British weapon research and development organisation of the Second World War.

Its two key figures were Major Millis Jefferis and Stuart Macrae, former editor of Armchair Science magazine.

== History ==
MD1 began in "Military Intelligence Research" (MIR). MIR was a department of the War Office set up in 1939 under Lt-Col Joe Holland, RE. Holland was the General Staff Officer Grade 1 (GSO1) and brought in Jefferis, also a Royal Engineers sapper and explosives expert, with experience in India, as GSO2 to head MIR(c) a division of MIR that was to develop weapons for irregular warfare. Needing special magnets, Jefferis brought in Macrae initially as an outside contractor but later to be brought into uniform and serve as his deputy. Between them they produced the limpet mine, a timed explosive that could be stuck to the underside of a ship.

MIR(c) started in a room at the War Office, Macrae initially secured offices and workshop space at IBC, owners of Radio Normandie, in London. Macrae soon also secured all the staff, including Norman Angier who continued as Assistant Director and senior civilian member of the staff throughout the war. Following an air raid, a large country house The Firs (fortunately the second home of a patriotic Major) was requisitioned and the design and workshops relocated there, in Whitchurch near Aylesbury in Buckinghamshire close to the Prime Minister at Chequers. There they developed and to some extent produced munitions.

During the phoney war, MIR(c) was engaged in developing the floating mine required for Churchill's planned Operation Royal Marine which aimed to disrupt German shipping in their inland waterways by dropping these mines into the river at Strasbourg.

Churchill lobbied for recognition of Jefferis, suggesting promotion.

When MIR was combined with other activities to form the Special Operations Executive, MIR(C) instead (in November 1940) became a department in the Ministry of Defence; effectively under the wing of the Prime Minister who was the Minister of Defence. As First Lord of the Treasury as well, Churchill could provide funds. Churchill, Professor Lindemann and General Ismay (Churchill's chief scientific and military advisors respectively) would protect MD1 from the Ministry of Supply and the Ordnance Board whose areas they encroached on. The Ministry of Supply carried out the necessary administration of MD1 but the War Cabinet was in control. Jefferis was promoted to Lieutenant-Colonel and Macrae to Major.

Other staff at MD1 included Stewart Blacker who was brought in after his privately invented Blacker Bombard was taken on for official development.

With the end of the war and the removal of Churchill from office, MD1 was taken over by the Ministry of Supply and the Weapons research establishment at Fort Halstead with the result that it was disbanded. Macrae felt this was an act of revenge by those who had opposed it and Professor Lindemann. Production machinery went to the Rocket Propulsion Establishment at Westcott effectively for scrapping. Jefferis received an appointment to the Pakistan Army.

== Inventions ==
- Sticky bomb – an anti-tank weapon consisting of a glass sphere containing nitroglycerin covered in a powerful adhesive. It was intended to stick to the target vehicle before exploding.
- PIAT – a hand-held anti-tank weapon based on the spigot mortar that launched a 2.5 lb (1.1 kg) shaped charge bomb using a powerful spring and a cartridge on the tail of the projectile.
- Limpet mine – a type of naval mine attached to a target by magnets. It is so named because of its superficial similarity to the limpet, a type of mollusc.
- Puff Ball.
- W bomb – A sub-surface floating delayed activation contact mine for use against river traffic and structures. Designed to disrupt merchant shipping on the Rhine, 1,700 were deployed destroying bridges and ships.
- Clam – miniature version of Limpet mine; a small magnetic charge, detonated by an L-Delay or Time Pencil.
- Beehive charge – a shaped charge with guide rods to ensure correct distancing. Named for the characteristic shape.
- Squawker acoustic decoy – developed by Lieutenant-Colonel Brinsmead.
- Time pencil – a time fuse designed to be connected to a detonator or short length of safety fuse. Also referred to as "Switches".
- Lead Delay Switch ("Switch No. 9") – a more precise timer using the mechanical creep of a lead alloy for its operation.
- M Mine – anti-personnel weapon in a cardboard body; detonated when trodden on.
- Kangaroo bomb.
- "AP Switch" – an anti-personnel weapon based on a .303 inch rifle cartridge and a pressure-sensitive trigger.
- "Bomb, H.E., Aircraft, J.W., 400lb" (the "Johnnie Walker" bomb) – Upon entering the water the bomb was expected to dive underwater then surface. This would be repeated until it struck the relatively less protected underside of a ship at which point the 90 lb (41 kg) Torpex warhead would explode. The mine would self detonate if its propellant (compressed hydrogen) ran out before it struck something.

== See also ==
- Directorate of Miscellaneous Weapons Development
- Hobart's Funnies
- Station IX
