= PIAT =

Projector, Infantry, Anti Tank
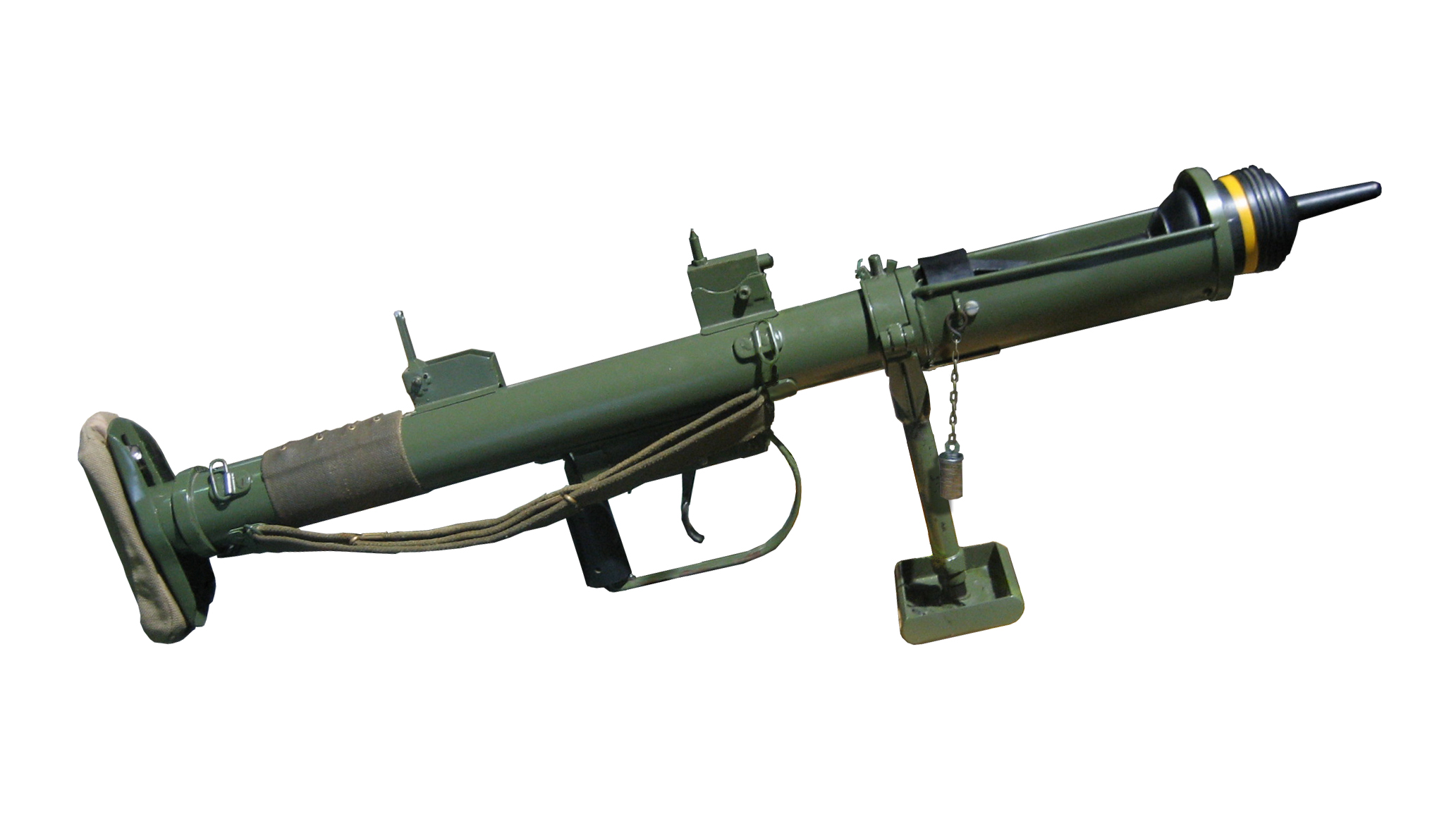
- PIAT at the Army Flying Museum
- Type: Anti-tank weapon
- Place of origin: United Kingdom

Service history
- In service: 1943–1971
- Used by: British Empire & Commonwealth
- Wars: Second World War; Indonesian National Revolution; First Indochina War; Malayan Emergency; 1948 Arab–Israeli War; Korean War

Production history
- Designer: Major Millis Jefferis
- Designed: 1942
- Manufacturer: Imperial Chemical Industries Ltd., various others.
- Produced: August 1942
- No. built: 115,000

Specifications
- Mass: 32 lb (15 kg)
- Length: 39 in (0.99 m)
- Calibre: 83 mm (3.3 in)
- Action: Spigot mortar
- Muzzle velocity: 250 ft/s (76 m/s)
- Effective firing range: 115 yd (105 m)
- Maximum firing range: 350 yd (320 m)
- Sights: Aperture sight
- Filling: Shaped charge
- Detonation mechanism: Impact

The Projector, Infantry, Anti Tank (PIAT) Mk I was a British man-portable anti-tank weapon developed during the Second World War. The PIAT was designed in 1942 in response to the British Army's need for a more effective infantry anti-tank weapon and entered service in 1943.

The PIAT was based on the spigot mortar system, and projected (launched) a 2.5 pound (1.1 kg) shaped charge bomb using a cartridge in the tail of the projectile. It possessed an effective range of approximately 115 yards (105 m) in a direct fire anti-tank role, and 350 yards (320 m) in an indirect fire role. The PIAT had several advantages over other infantry anti-tank weapons of the period: it had greatly increased penetration power over the previous anti-tank rifles, it had no back-blast which might reveal the position of the user or accidentally injure friendly soldiers around the user, and it was simple in construction. However, the device also had some disadvantages: powerful recoil, a difficulty in cocking the weapon, and early problems with ammunition reliability.

The PIAT was first used during the Tunisian campaign in 1943, and remained in use with British and other Commonwealth forces until the early 1950s. PIATs were supplied to or obtained by other nations and forces, including the Soviet Union (through Lend Lease), the French resistance, the Polish Underground, and the Israeli Haganah (which used PIATs during the 1948 Arab–Israeli War). Six members of the British and other Commonwealth armed forces received Victoria Crosses for their use of the PIAT in combat.

== Development ==
At the beginning of the Second World War, the British Army possessed two primary anti-tank weapons for its infantry: the Boys anti-tank rifle and the No. 68 AT rifle grenade. However, neither of these was particularly effective as an anti-tank weapon. The No. 68 anti-tank grenade was designed to be fired from a discharger fitted onto the muzzle of an infantryman's rifle, but this meant that the grenade was too light to deal significant damage, resulting in it rarely being used in action. The Boys was also inadequate in the anti-tank role. It was heavy, which meant that it was difficult for infantry to handle effectively, and was outdated; by 1940 it was effective only at short ranges, and then only against armoured cars and light tanks. In November 1941 during Operation Crusader, part of the North African Campaign, staff officers of the British Eighth Army were unable to find even a single instance of a Boys knocking out a German tank.

Due to these limitations, a new infantry anti-tank weapon was required, and this ultimately came in the form of the Projector, Infantry, Anti-Tank, commonly abbreviated to PIAT. The origins of the PIAT can be traced back as far as 1888, when an American engineer by the name of Charles Edward Munroe was experimenting with guncotton; he discovered that the explosive would yield a great deal more damage if there were a recess in it facing the target. This phenomenon is known as the "Munroe effect". The German scientist Egon Neumann found that lining the recess with metal enhanced the damage dealt even more. By the 1930s Henry Mohaupt, a Swiss engineer, had developed this technology even further and created shaped charge ammunition. This consisted of a recessed metal cone placed into an explosive warhead; when the warhead hit its target, the explosive detonated and turned the cone into an extremely high-speed spike. The speed of the spike, and the immense pressure it caused on impact allowed it to create a small hole in armour plating and send a large pressure wave and large amounts of fragments into the interior of the target. It was this technology that was used in the No. 68 AT grenade.

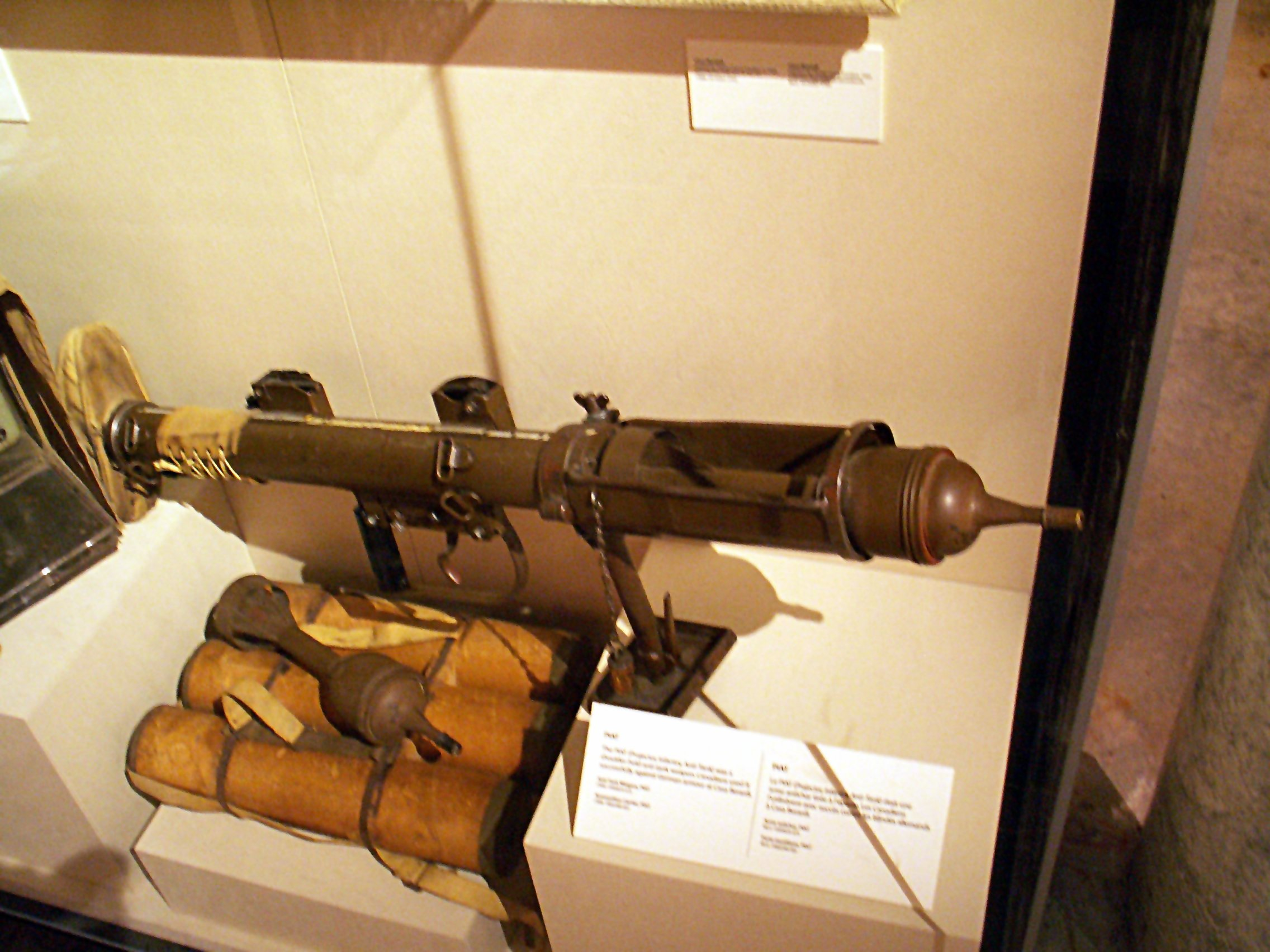
PIAT and ammunition case at the Canadian War Museum

Although the technology existed, it remained for British designers to develop a system that could deliver shaped charge ammunition in a larger size and with a greater range than that possessed by the No. 68. At the same time that Mohaupt was developing shaped charge ammunition, Lieutenant Colonel Stewart Blacker of the Royal Artillery was investigating the possibility of developing a lightweight platoon mortar. However, rather than using the conventional system of firing the mortar shell from a barrel fixed to a baseplate, Blacker wanted to use the spigot mortar system. Instead of a barrel, there was a steel rod known as a "spigot" fixed to a baseplate, and the bomb itself had a propellant charge inside its tail. When the mortar was to be fired, the bomb was pushed down onto the spigot, which exploded the propellant charge and blew the bomb into the air. By effectively putting the barrel on the inside of the weapon, the barrel diameter was no longer a limitation on the warhead size. Blacker eventually designed a lightweight mortar that he named the "Arbalest" and submitted it to the War Office, but it was turned down in favour of a Spanish design. Undeterred, however, Blacker continued with his experiments and decided to try to invent a hand-held anti-tank weapon based on the spigot design, but found that the spigot could not generate sufficient velocity needed to penetrate armour. But he did not abandon the design, and eventually came up with the Blacker Bombard, a swivelling spigot-style system that could launch a 20-pound (9 kg) bomb approximately 100 yards (90 m). Although the bombs it fired could not actually penetrate armour, they could still severely damage tanks, and in 1940 a large number of Blacker Bombards were issued to the Home Guard as anti-tank weapons.

PIAT ammunition

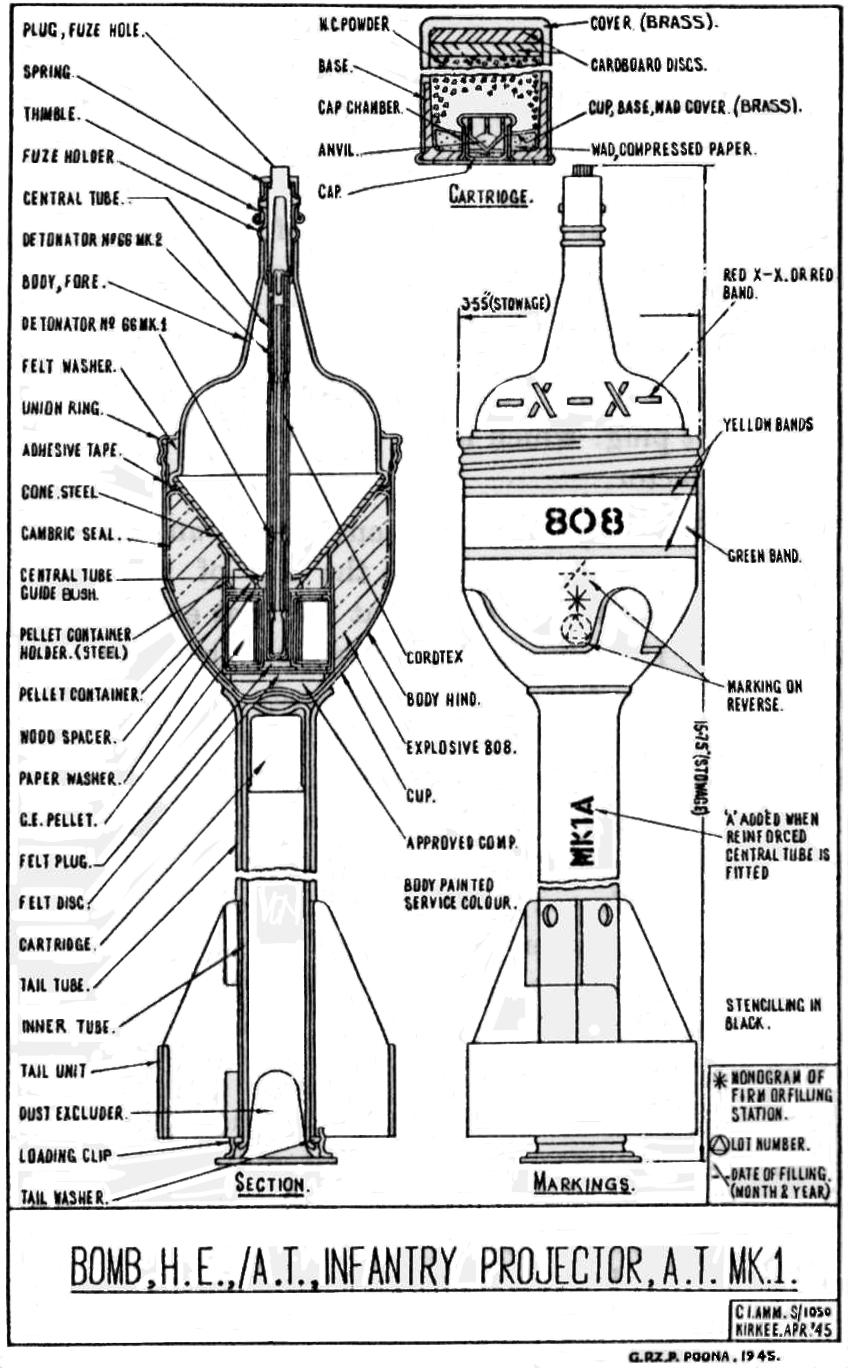
1945 diagram of a PIAT bomb

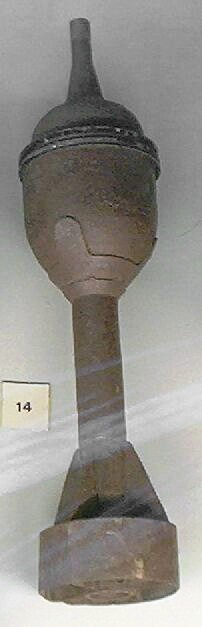
A round on museum display

When Blacker became aware of the existence of shaped charge ammunition, he realized that it was exactly the kind of ammunition he was looking for to develop a hand-held anti-tank weapon, as it depended upon the energy contained within itself, and not the sheer velocity at which it was fired. Blacker then developed a shaped charge bomb with a propellant charge in its tail, which fitted into a shoulder-fired launcher that consisted of a metal casing containing a large spring and a spigot; the bomb was placed into a trough at the front of the casing, and when the trigger was pulled the spigot rammed into the tail of the bomb and fired it out of the casing and up to approximately 140 metres (150 yd) away. Blacker called the weapon the "Baby Bombard", and presented it to the War Office in 1941. However, when the weapon was tested it proved to have a host of problems; a War Office report of June 1941 stated that the casing was flimsy and the spigot itself did not always fire when the trigger was pulled, and none of the bombs provided exploded upon contact with the target.

At the time that he developed the Baby Bombard and sent it off the War Office, Blacker was working for a government department known as MD1, which was given the task of developing and delivering weapons for use by guerrilla and resistance groups in Occupied Europe. Shortly after the trial of the Baby Bombard, Blacker was posted to other duties, and left the anti-tank weapon in the hands of a colleague in the department, Major Millis Jefferis.

Jefferis took the prototype Baby Bombard apart on the floor of his office in MD1 and rebuilt it, and then combined it with a shaped charge mortar bomb to create what he called the "Jefferis Shoulder Gun". Jefferis then had a small number of prototype armour-piercing high-explosive anti-tank (HEAT) rounds made, and took the weapon to be tested at the Small Arms School at Bisley. A warrant officer took the Shoulder Gun down to a firing range, aimed it at an armoured target, and pulled the trigger; the Shoulder Gun pierced a hole in the target, but also wounded the warrant officer when a piece of metal from the exploding round flew back and hit him. Jefferis himself then took the place of the warrant officer and fired off several more rounds, all of which pierced the armoured target but without wounding him. Impressed with the weapon, the Ordnance Board of the Small Arms School had the faults with the ammunition corrected, renamed the Shoulder Gun as the Projector, Infantry, Anti Tank, and ordered that it be issued to infantry units as a hand-held anti-tank weapon. Production of the PIAT began at the end of August 1942.

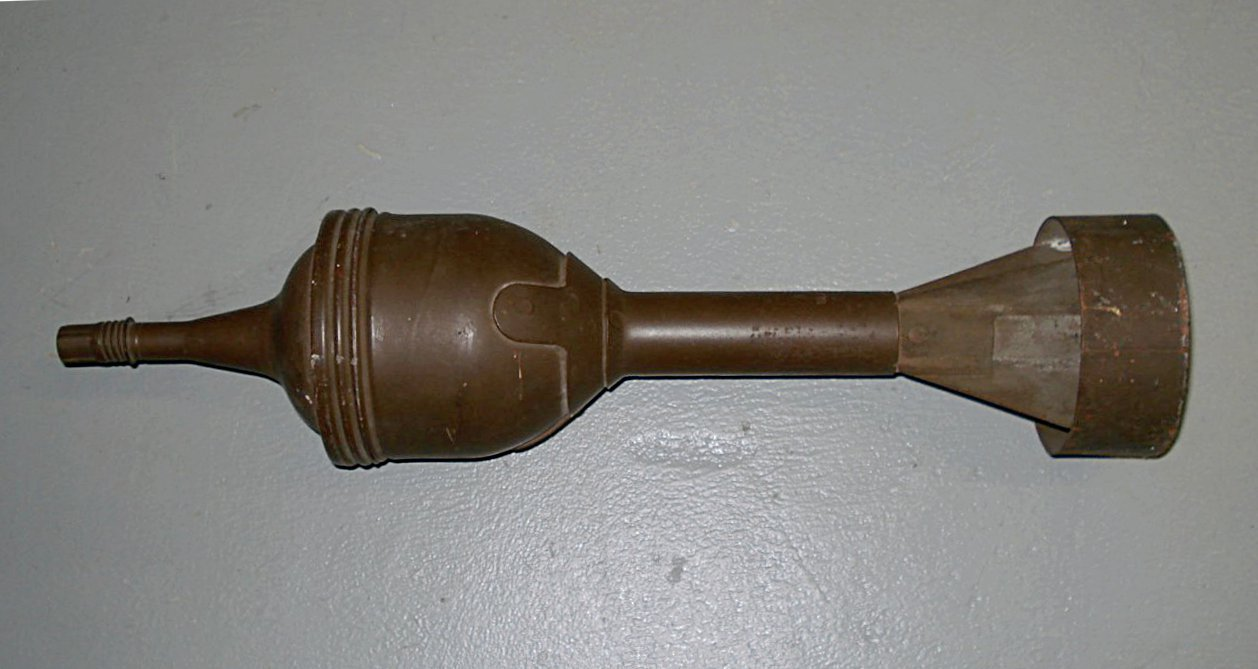
PIAT HEAT projectile, Canadian Military Heritage Museum, Brantford, Ontario (2007)

There was disagreement over the name to be given to the new weapon. A press report in 1944 gave credit for both the PIAT and the Blacker Bombard to Jefferis. Blacker took exception to this and suggested to Jefferis that they should divide any award equally after his expenses had been deducted. The Ministry of Supply had already paid Blacker £50,000 for his expenses in relation to the Bombard and PIAT. Churchill himself got involved in the argument; writing to the secretary of state for war in January 1943 he asked "Why should the name 'Jefferis shoulder gun' be changed to PIAT? Nobody objected to the Boys rifle, although that had a rather odd ring." Churchill supported Jefferis claims, but he did not get his way. For his part Blacker received £25,000 from the Royal Commission on Awards to Inventors. (Note: The 1957 report of the commission identified awards to Blacker as £7000 in addition to interim £25,000 "already awarded" for the Bombard, Hedgehog, Piat, and Petard projectiles, and the PIAT projector and Petard spigot mortar (used on the Churchill tank).)

== Design ==
In firing, the pin moves forward into the round, the round is fired pushing the rod back against the spring and cocking it again.

The PIAT was 39 inches (0.99 m) long and weighed 32 pounds (15 kg), with an effective direct fire range of approximately 115 yards (105 m) and a maximum indirect fire range of 350 yards (320 m). It could be carried and operated by one man, but was usually assigned to a two-man team, the second man acting as an ammunition carrier and loader. The body of the PIAT launcher was a tube constructed out of thin sheets of steel, containing the spigot mechanism, trigger mechanism and firing spring. At the front of the launcher was a small trough in which the bomb was placed, and the movable spigot ran along the axis of the launcher and into the trough. Padding for the user's shoulder was fitted to the other end of the launcher, and rudimentary aperture sights were fitted on top for aiming; the bombs launched by the PIAT possessed hollow tubular tails, into which a small propellant cartridge was inserted, and shaped charge warheads.

Conventional spigot mortar designs have a fixed spigot rod, for example the Blacker Bombard. The moving spigot rod in the PIAT design was unusual, and served to help reduce recoil sufficiently to make it a viable shoulder fired weapon.

The PIAT was a little lighter by about 1 kg (2 lb 3 oz) and about 0.6 m (2.0 ft) shorter than its predecessor, the Boys anti-tank rifle, although it was heavier than the 18 lb (8.2 kg) bazooka.

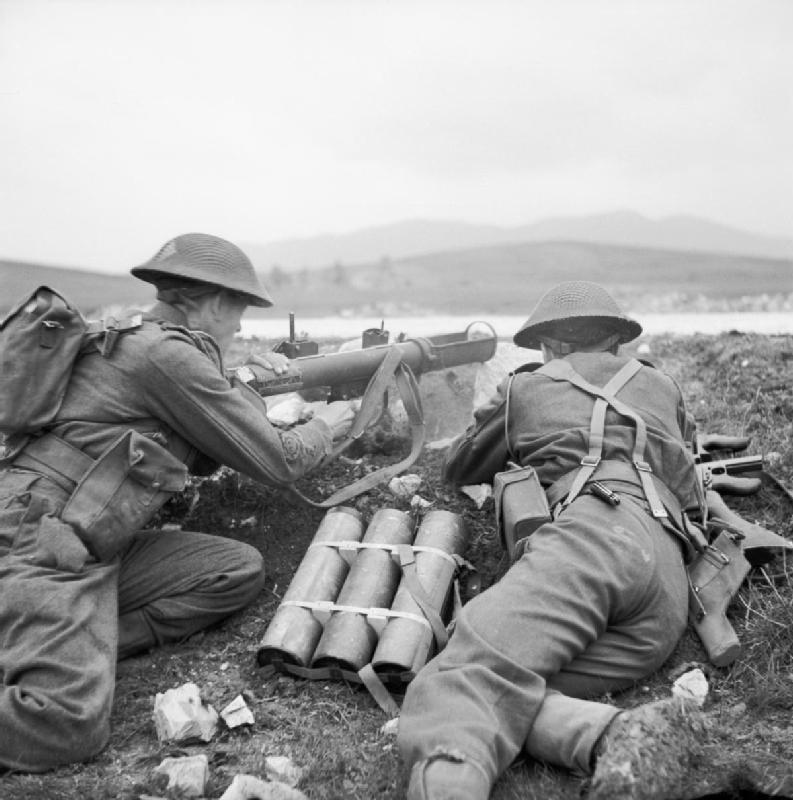
A PIAT team at a firing range in Tunisia, 19 February 1943; part of a demonstration team. Crew has a cardboard three-round ammunition case

To prepare the weapon for firing the spigot mechanism, which was operated by a large spring, had to be cocked, and to do this was a difficult and awkward process. The user had to first place the PIAT on its butt, then step on both sides of the shoulder padding (a la Pogo stick) and quarter-turn the weapon to unlock the body and simultaneously lock the spigot rod to the butt; the user would then have to bend over and pull the body of the weapon upwards, thereby pulling the spring back until it attached to the trigger sear and cocking the weapon. Once this was achieved, the body was then lowered and quarter-turned to reattach it to the rest of the weapon, and the PIAT could then be fired. Users of a small stature often found the cocking sequence challenging, as they did not have the sufficient height required to pull the body up far enough to cock the weapon; it was also difficult to do when lying in a prone position, as was often the case when using the weapon in action.

Note, however, that troops were trained to cock the PIAT before expected use, and "in action the projector will always be carried cocked" (but unloaded). Unless a stoppage occurred, or the shooter did not maintain their hold as the weapon recoiled, it would not normally be necessary to manually re-cock the weapon in action.

When the trigger was pulled, the spring pushed the spigot rod (which has a fixed firing pin on the end) forwards into the bomb, which aligned the bomb, ignited the propellant cartridge in the bomb and launched it along the rod and into the air. The recoil caused by the detonation of the propellant blew the spigot rod backwards onto the spring, similar to that of a blowback operation; this reduced the shock of recoil and automatically cocked the weapon for subsequent shots, eliminating the need to manually re-cock.

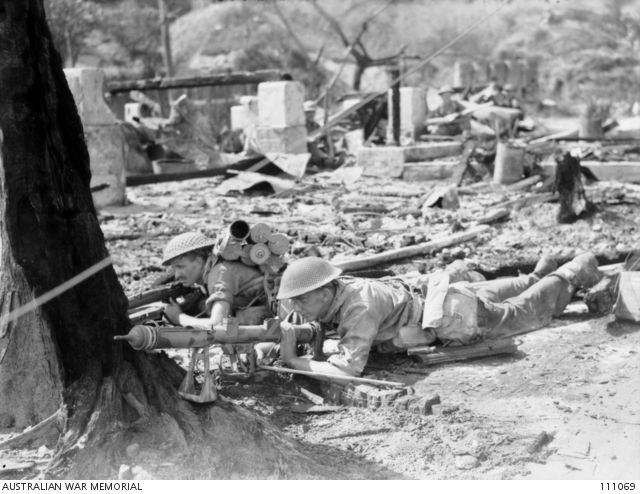
An Australian PIAT team during the Battle of Balikpapan, 1945

Tactical training emphasized that it was best used with surprise and concealment on the side of the PIAT team, and where possible enemy armoured vehicles should be engaged from the flank or rear. Due to the short engagement distances and the power of the bomb, the crew could be in the bomb blast zone so hard cover was desirable; on open training grounds this might be a slit trench. The PIAT was often also used in combat to knock out enemy positions located in houses and bunkers. It was officially given an additional role as an ad-hoc crude mortar, by placing the shoulder pad of the weapon on the ground and supporting it: one rifleman considered it a more effective infantry mortar than the official two-inch mortar.

Despite the difficulties in cocking and firing the weapon, it did have several advantages. The Spigot mortar design allowed a large calibre powerful shaped charge bomb giving greatly increased penetration power over the previous anti-tank rifles, allowing it to remain effective for the rest of the war; its construction was relatively simple and robust without a conventional barrel; there was no back-blast (unlike the contemporary American bazooka) that might endanger friendly troops and give the user's position away, this also meant that the PIAT could be used in confined spaces as in urban warfare; compared to the previous anti-tank rifles the muzzle blast was minimal, also a potential concealment issue. However, the weapon did have drawbacks. It was very heavy and bulky, which meant that it was often unpopular with infantry required to carry it. There were also problems with early ammunition reliability and accuracy. Although the PIAT was theoretically able to penetrate approximately 100 millimetres (4 in) of armour, field experience during the Allied invasion of Sicily, which was substantiated by trials conducted during 1944, demonstrated that this capability was often nullified by problems of accuracy and round reliability. During these trials, a skilled user was unable to hit a target more than 60% of the time at 100 yards (90 m), and faulty fuses meant that only 75% of the bombs fired detonated on-target.

== Ammunition and effect ==
The PIATs' ammunition used the shaped charge principle, which, if the often unreliable early round design delivered it correctly to the target, allowed the warhead to penetrate almost all enemy armour types at close range.

The following ammunition types were available in 1943.

- Service bomb - "Bomb, HE/AT"
  - Manual says green, but museum examples seem to be brown.
  - AT shaped charge warhead design. Supplied with the propellant cartridge fitted and the fuse separate.
  - Versions:
    - Mark I, 1942, Nobels 808 plastic explosive filling, green band
    - Mark IA, reinforced central tube
    - Mark II, revised nose fuse
    - Mark III, revised nose fuse, TNT filling, blue band
    - Mark IV, July 1944, revised construction to reduce rearward fragmentation and "back blast" of warhead explosion.
  - Also useful as a general-purpose HE blast type round
- Drill -"Bomb, drill/AT"
  - Black, marked "drill"
  - Same shape as a live round, for dry loading practice. Cannot be fired or dry fired.
- Practice bomb - "Shot, practice/AT"
  - White
  - Cylindrical thick steel construction, effectively a sub-calibre practice round. The PIAT requires a trough-like adapter to use it. Economical as it may be fired many times with new propellant cartridges. Trajectory slightly different to service bomb.
- Inert - "Bomb, practice inert/AT"
  - Black, yellow ring, marked "inert"
  - Same size and weight as a live round, no warhead, but has a live propellant cartridge. It can be fired once from a standard PIAT, it is not re-usable.

Rounds were supplied in three-round ammunition cases with the propellant cartridge fitted and the fuses separate.

Getting the bomb to detonate reliably against angled targets was troublesome and was addressed with revised fusing. See also the bazooka, which had similar early problems.

The 1943 manual simply describes the service bomb as "H.E." or "HE/AT" and does not mention shaped charge as such. It notes that the bomb has "Excellent penetration. The bomb can penetrate the armour of the latest known types of enemy A.F.Vs. and a considerable thickness of reinforced concrete". It also notes that it may be used "as a house-breaker".

== Operational history ==
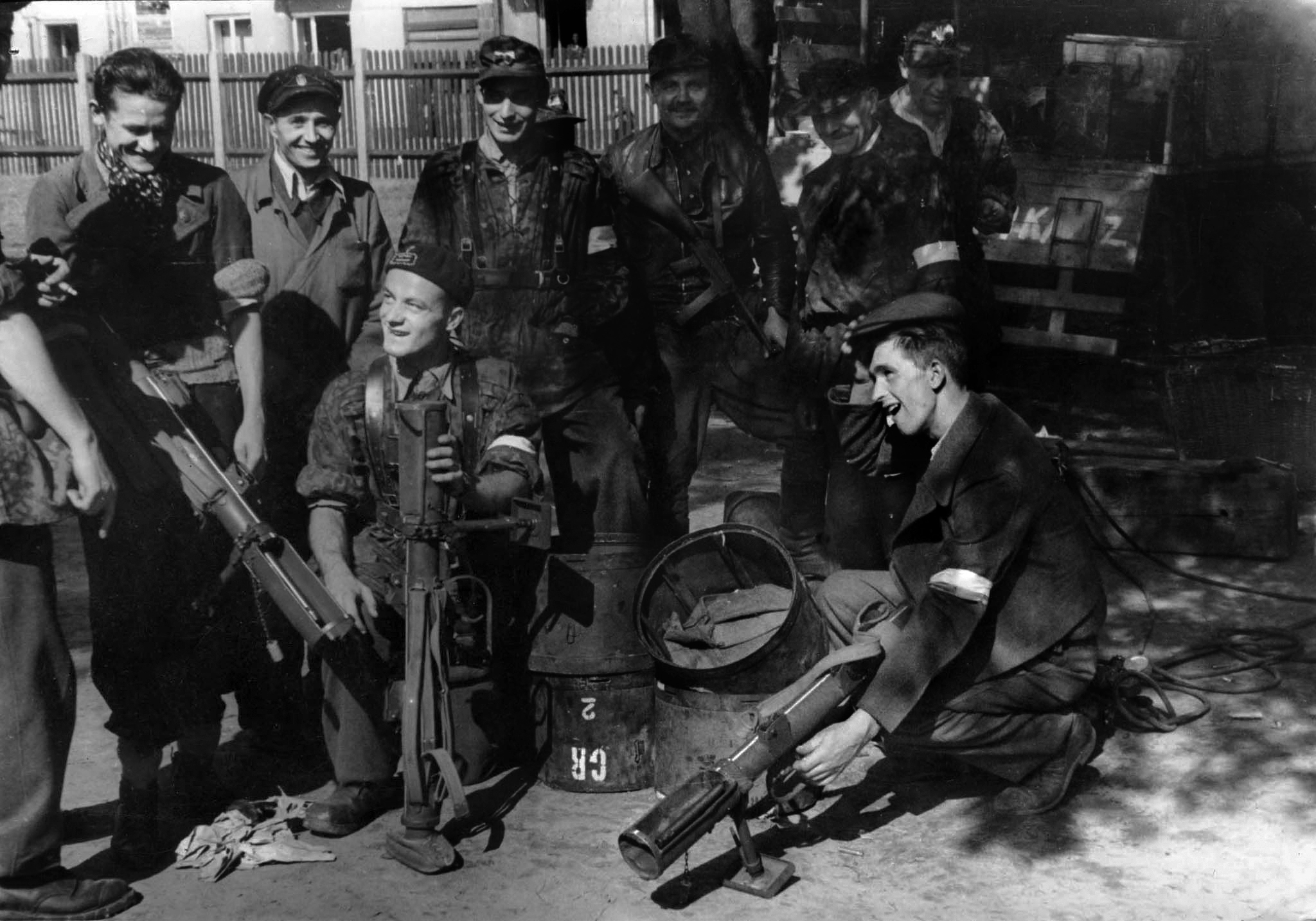
Warsaw Uprising combatants display PIAT weapons.

=== World War II ===
The PIAT was used in all theatres in which British and other Commonwealth forces served.

It entered service in early-1943, and was first used in action in March near Majaz al Bab during the Tunisia Campaign. The 1944 war establishment for a British platoon, which contained 36 men, had a single PIAT attached to the platoon headquarters, alongside a 2-inch (51 mm) mortar detachment. Three PIATs were issued to every company at the headquarters level for issuing at the CO discretion – allowing one weapon for each platoon. British Army and Royal Marines commandos were also issued with PIATs and used them in action.

In Australian Army service, the PIAT was also known as "Projector Infantry Tank Attack" (PITA). From 1943, one PIAT team was allocated to each infantry platoon in a jungle division – the tropical light infantry formation that was the standard front-line Australian division in the South West Pacific theatre. It was used against Japanese tanks, other vehicles and fortifications during the Borneo campaign of 1945.

A contemporary (1944–45) Canadian Army survey questioned 161 army officers, who had recently left combat, about the effectiveness of 31 different infantry weapons. In that survey the PIAT was ranked the most "outstandingly effective" weapon, followed by the Bren gun.

An analysis by British staff officers of the initial period of the Normandy campaign found that 7% of all German tanks destroyed by British forces were knocked out by PIATs, compared to 6% by rockets fired by aircraft. However, they also found that once German tanks had been fitted with armoured skirts that detonated shaped charge ammunition before it could penetrate the tank's armour, the weapon became much less effective.

As part of the Anglo-Soviet Military Supplies Agreement, by 31 March 1946 the Soviet Union had been supplied with 1000 PIATs and 100,000 rounds of ammunition. The PIAT was also used by resistance groups in Occupied Europe. During the Warsaw Uprising, it was one of many weapons that Polish Underground resistance fighters used against German forces. In occupied France, the French resistance used the PIAT in the absence of mortars or artillery.

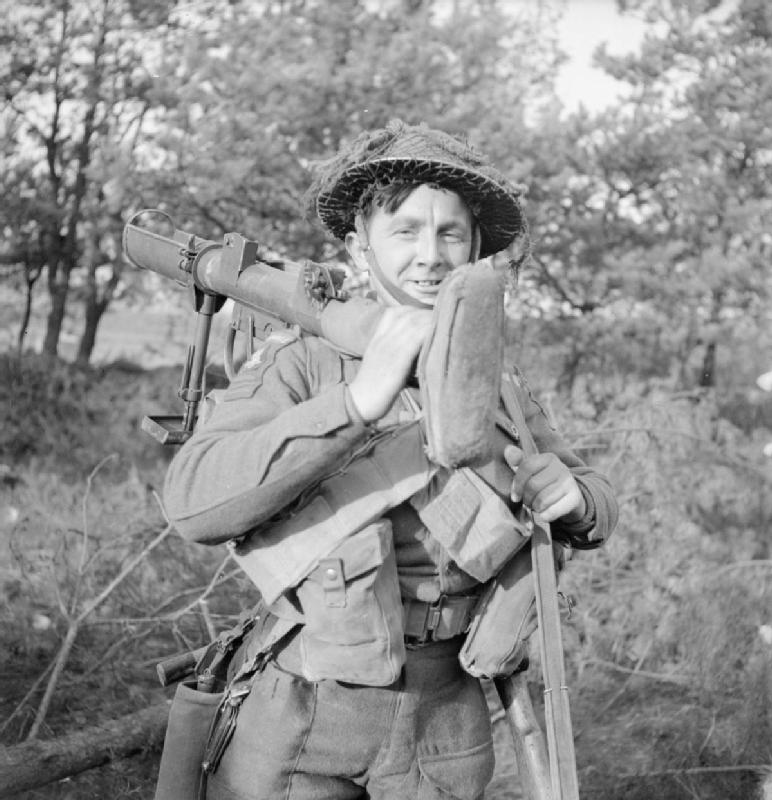
A soldier of the Duke of Cornwall's Light Infantry carrying a PIAT, November 1944

Six Victoria Crosses were awarded to members of the British and other Commonwealth armed forces for actions using the PIAT:

- On 16 May 1944, during the Italian Campaign, Fusilier Frank Jefferson used a PIAT to destroy a Panzer IV tank and repel a German counterattack launched against his unit as they assaulted a section of the Gustav Line.
- On 6 June 1944, Company Sergeant Major Stanley Hollis, in one of several actions that day, used a PIAT in an attack against a German field gun.
- On 12 June 1944 Rifleman Ganju Lama of the 7th Gurkha Rifles used a PIAT to knock out two Japanese tanks attacking his unit at Ningthoukhong, Manipur (given as Burma in the official citation). Despite sustaining injuries, Ganju Lama approached within thirty yards (27 m) of the enemy tanks, and having knocked them out moved on to attack the crews as they tried to escape. When asked by his Army Commander, William Slim, why he went so close, he replied he was not certain of hitting with a PIAT beyond thirty yards (27 m).
- Between 19 and 25 September 1944, during the Battle of Arnhem, Major Robert Henry Cain used a PIAT to disable an assault gun that was advancing on his company position, and to force another three German Panzer IV tanks to retreat during a later assault.
- On the night of 21/22 October 1944, Private Ernest Alvia ("Smokey") Smith used a PIAT to destroy a German Panther tank, one of three Panthers and two self-propelled guns attacking his small group. The self-propelled vehicles were also knocked out. He then used a Thompson submachine gun to kill or repel about 30 enemy soldiers. His actions secured a bridgehead on the Savio River in Italy.
- On 9 December 1944, while defending positions in Faenza, Italy, Captain John Henry Cound Brunt used a PIAT, amongst other weapons, to help repel an attack by the German 90th Panzergrenadier Division.

=== After World War II ===
The PIAT remained in service until the early 1950s, when it was replaced initially by the ENERGA anti-tank rifle grenade and then the American M20 "Super Bazooka". The Australian Army briefly used PIATs at the start of the Korean War alongside 2.36-inch (60 mm) bazookas, but quickly replaced both weapons with 3.5-inch (89 mm) M20 "Super Bazookas".

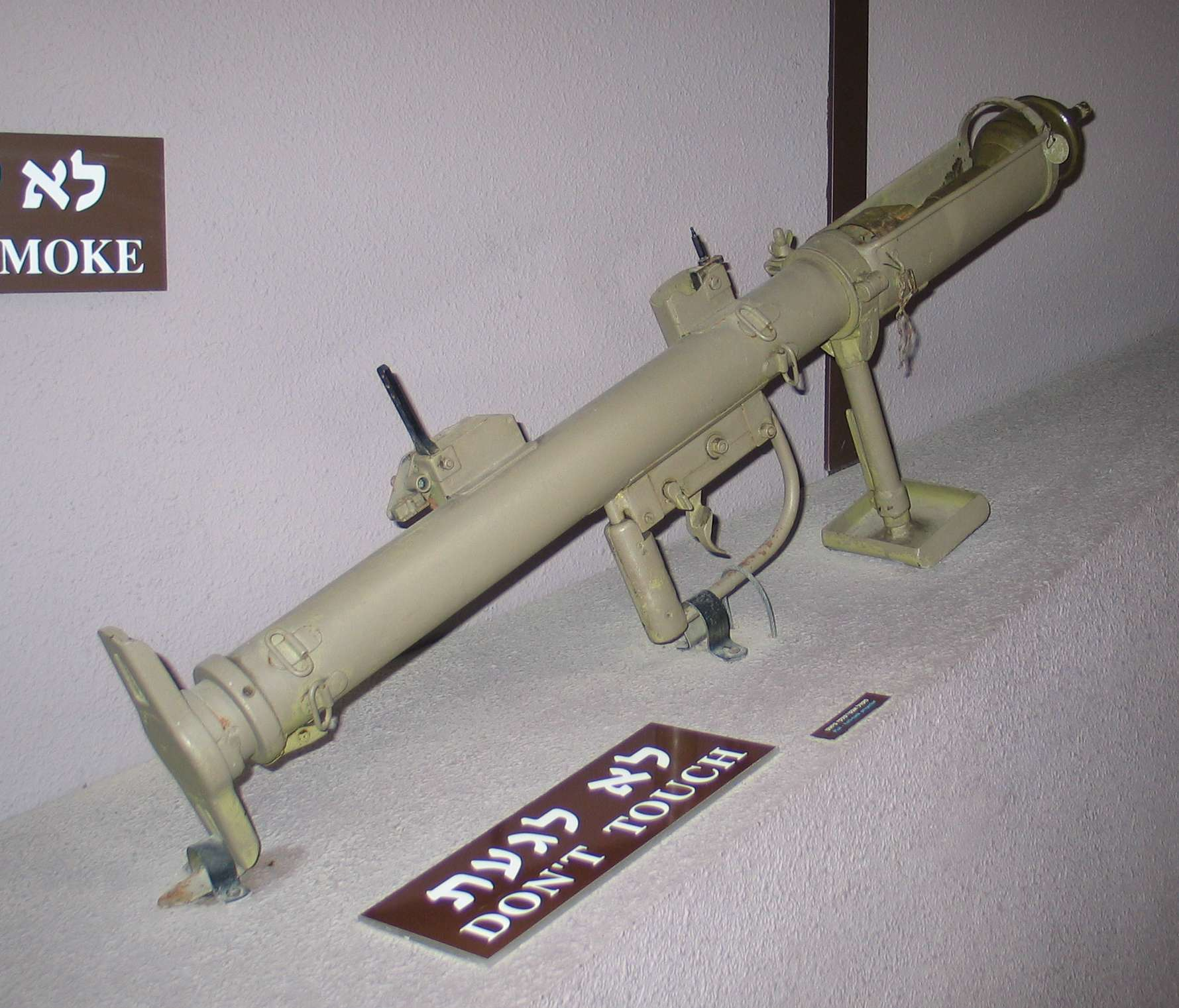
PIAT in the Etzel Museum (Beit Gidi), Tel Aviv, Israel

The Haganah and the emerging Israel Defence Force (IDF) used PIATs against Arab armour during the 1947–1949 Palestine war.

PIATs were also used by French and Việt Minh forces during the First Indochina War. Some locally-made copies were also used during the First Indochina War.

The Indian Army was still using PIATs by the 1971 Indo-Pakistan war, they were used at the Battle of Longewala helping to halt the Pakistani armoured division advance.

== Users ==
- Australia
- Belgium
- Canada
- Free French Forces
- Kingdom of Greece
- India
- Indonesia captured from British and Dutch forces and used by republicans in Indonesian National Revolution
- Israel
- Italy (Co-Belligerent Army and partisans)
- Luxembourg
- Malaya (later Malaysia) also used by Malayan People's Anti-Japanese Army and Malayan National Liberation Army in both World War II and Malayan Emergency
- Netherlands known in Dutch service as granaatwerper tp (tegen pantser) ("grenade launcher anti-tank") entered service in 1943, with Dutch forces fighting under British command. It served into the 1950s.
- New Zealand
- North Vietnam captured from France and used by Viet Minh in First Indochina War
- Polish Underground
- Soviet Union
- United Kingdom
- Yugoslavia Used by Yugoslav partisans

== Combat use ==
World War II:

- Battle of Normandy (France 1944)
- Battle of Arnhem (Netherlands, 1944)
- Battle of Ortona (Italy, 1943)
- Battle of Villers-Bocage (Normandy, France, 1944)
- Operation Epsom (Normandy, France, 1944)
- Operation Perch (Normandy, France, 1944)
- Warsaw Uprising (1944)

1948 Arab–Israeli War:

- Battle of Yad Mordechai (Israel, 1948)
- Battles of the Kinarot Valley (Israel, 1948)

Indo-Pakistani war of 1971:

- Battle of Longewala (India, 1971)

== See also ==
- Panzerfaust – (Nazi Germany)
- Bazooka – (United States)
- RPG-1 – (Soviet Union)
- Type 4 70 mm AT rocket launcher – (Empire of Japan)
- Blacker Bombard – (United Kingdom)
- Carl Gustaf 8.4 cm recoilless rifle – (Sweden)

== Bibliography ==
- Bishop, Chris (2002). The Encyclopedia of Weapons of World War II: The Comprehensive Guide to Over 1,500 Weapons Systems, Including Tanks, Small Arms, Warplanes, Artillery, Ships and Submarines. Sterling Publishing Company, Inc. ISBN 978-1-58663-762-0.
- Bruce, George (1972). Warsaw Uprising. Harper Collins. ISBN 978-0-246-10526-4.
- Bull, Stephen; Dennis, Peter; Delf, Brian; Chappell, Mike; Windrow, Martin (2004). World War II Infantry Tactics. Osprey Publishing. ISBN 978-1-84176-663-8.
- Cohen Commission (1957). Awards to Inventors - Use of Inventions and Designs by Government Departments – via Archive.org.
- Copp, Terry (2004). Fields of Fire: The Canadians in Normandy. University of Toronto Press. ISBN 978-0-8020-3780-0.
- Crowdy, Terry; Steve Noon (2007). French Resistance Fighter: France's Secret Army. Osprey. ISBN 978-1-84603-076-5.
- French, David (2001) [2000]. Raising Churchill's Army: The British Army and the War against Germany 1919-1945. Oxford University Press. ISBN 978-0-19-924630-4.
- Edgerton, David (2011). Britain's War Machine: Weapons, Resources, and Experts in the Second World War. Oxford University Press. ISBN 978-0-19-983267-5.
- Hogg, Ian (1995). Tank Killers: Anti-Tank Warfare by Men and Machines. Pan Macmillan. ISBN 978-0-330-35316-8.
- Kuring, Ian (2004). Red Coats to Cams. A History of Australian Infantry 1788 to 2001. Sydney: Australian Military History Publications. ISBN 978-1-876439-99-6.
- Khan, Mark (April 2009). "The PIAT". Britain at War. April 2009 (24).
- Laffin, John; Chappell, Mike (1982). The Israeli Army in the Middle East Wars 1948-73. Osprey. ISBN 978-0-85045-450-5.
- Moreman, Tim (2006). Anderson, Duncan (consultant) (ed.). British Commandos 1940–1946. Battle Orders. Botley: Osprey Publishing. ISBN 978-1-84176-986-8.
- Moss, Matthew (2020). The PIAT Britain's anti-tank weapon of World War II. Osprey Publishing. ISBN 978-1-4728-3813-1.
- Neillands, Robin (2002). The Battle of Normandy 1944. Cassell. ISBN 978-0304358373.
- Rottman, Gordon L.; Noon, Steve; Windrow, Martin (2005). World War II Infantry Anti-Tank Tactics. Osprey Publishing. ISBN 978-1-84176-842-7.
- Phillips, Neville Crompton (1957). Italy Volume I: The Sangro to Cassino. The Official History of New Zealand in the Second World War 1939–1945. Wellington: Historical Publications Branch. Archived from the original on 26 March 2023.
- Weeks, John (1975). Men Against Tanks: A History of Anti-Tank Warfare. David & Charles. ISBN 978-0-7153-6909-8.
