= Armchair Science =

Armchair Science, first issue April 1929.

Armchair Science, August 1940

Armchair Science was a British monthly journal of topical and popular science articles published from 1929 to 1940; it ceased publication because of wartime paper shortages. The first editor was A. Percy Bradley, a mechanical engineer associated with Brooklands, then Professor A. M. Low. Issue one included: “Wonders of the Night Sky”; “How Flowers Breed and How they Fade”; “We Eat Bad Cheese, and why not Bad Meat?”; and “What is Noise?”. It cost one shilling, later reduced to sixpence. The publisher was Gale & Polden Ltd, London.

It reported the splitting of the atom, the chemical identification of Vitamin C, the finishing of the Dutch dam around the Zuyder Zee and developments in television. Looking to the future it asked “Are Whales Doomed?”, discussed the possibility of stereoscopic cinema, and reported biofuels and power from the sea.

Its editor in 1940, Stuart Macrae, went on to produce weapons for the war effort as part of MD1, known also as "Churchill's Toyshop".
