= Royal Commission on Awards to Inventors =

UK Royal Commission

A Royal Commission on Awards to Inventors is an occasional Royal Commission of the United Kingdom used to hear patent disputes.

On 6 October 1919 the Commission was convened to hear 11 claims for the invention of the tank; one of the eleven "claimants" was a team of two (thus there were 12 individuals involved), two of whom were Winston Churchill and Ernest Swinton.

The Commission was reconvened in 1946 to hear claims of inventors who "allege that their inventions, drawings or processes have been used by Government Departments and Allied Governments during the War".
