= Finnish Defence Forces military oath =

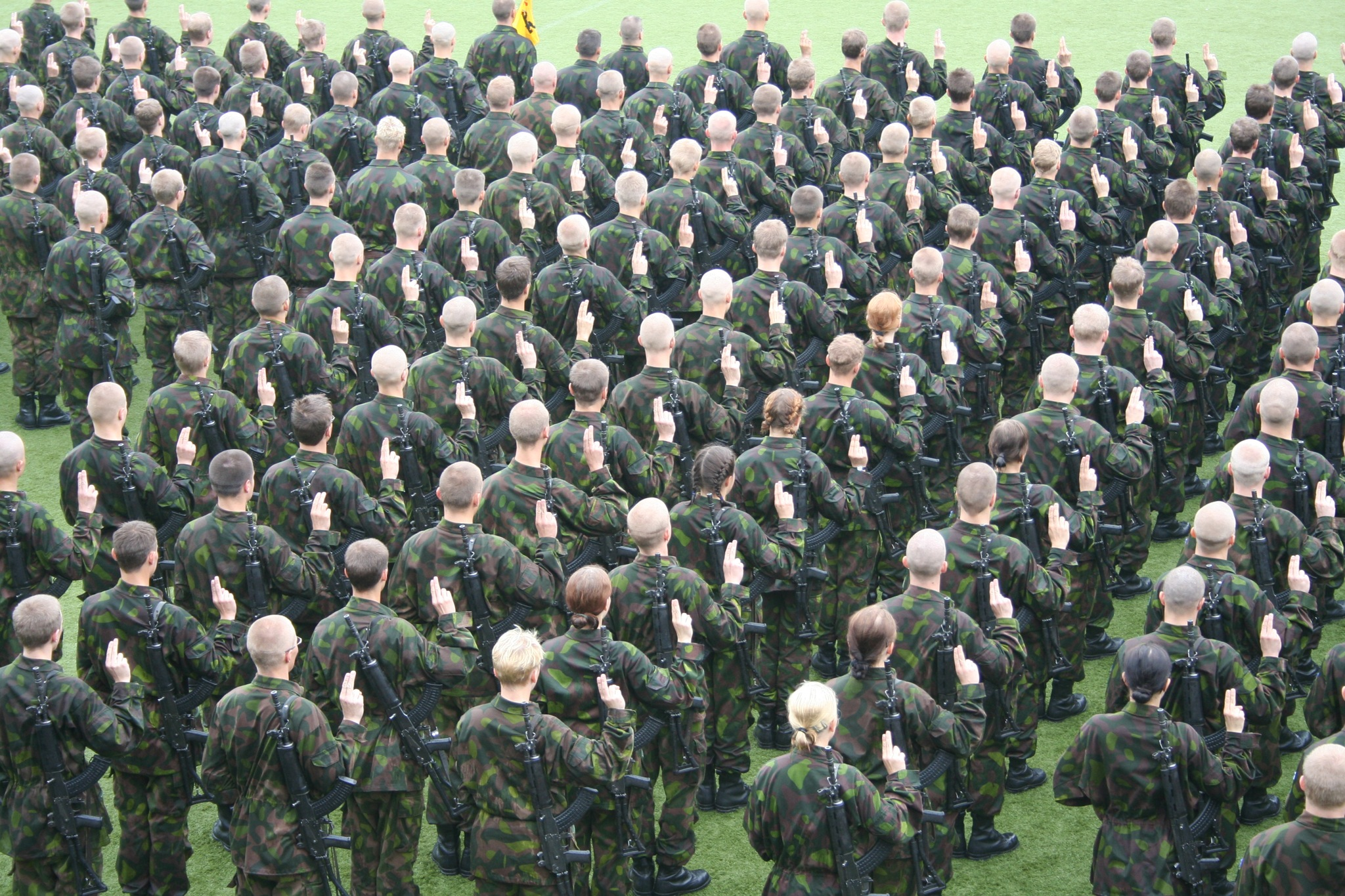
Finnish conscripts taking their military oath

Military oath in the Finnish Defence Forces is taken by conscripts on a legal basis in the beginning of their military service. If the conscript is unwilling to take the oath, another option is to take the military affirmation. Before the conscript is to take the oath, he must be briefed on the rights and responsibilities of a soldier, as well as on the meaning of the oath. The oath is administered by the unit's commanding officer and in the presence of the unit's flag. The military oath used to be available only to members of the church, however, current legislation no longer makes such a distinction.

Usually the military oath is taken after the basic training period or about seven weeks into the conscript's military service. Depending on the circumstances, the oath ceremony is held either at the garrison or at a nearby municipality. The aim is to make the event as ceremonious as possible. The relatives of the conscript's are usually invited to attend the ceremony. The ceremony also includes a parade, field service, equipment demonstration and lunch. After taking the oath, the conscripts receive the rank of private. The military affirmation is usually taken on the same day in a smaller ceremony. The conscripts who take the assurance usually still participate in the oath ceremony, but do not take the oath itself.

== Oath and affirmation text ==
=== Finnish text ===
Minä N. N. lupaan ja vakuutan kaikkivaltiaan ja kaikkitietävän Jumalan edessä (vakuutuksessa: kunniani ja omantuntoni kautta), olevani Suomen valtakunnan luotettava ja uskollinen kansalainen. Tahdon palvella maatani rehellisesti sekä parhaan kykyni mukaan etsiä ja edistää sen hyötyä ja parasta. Minä tahdon kaikkialla ja kaikissa tilanteissa, rauhan ja sodan aikana puolustaa isänmaani koskemattomuutta, sen laillista valtiojärjestystä sekä valtakunnan laillista esivaltaa. Jos havaitsen tai saan tietää jotakin olevan tekeillä laillisen esivallan kukistamiseksi tai maan valtiojärjestyksen kumoamiseksi, tahdon sen viipymättä viranomaisille ilmoittaa. Joukkoa, johon kuulun sekä paikkaani siinä, en jätä missään tilanteessa, vaan niin kauan kuin minussa voimia on, suoritan saamani tehtävän loppuun. Lupaan käyttäytyä kunnollisesti ja ryhdikkäästi, totella esimiehiäni, noudattaa lakeja ja asetuksia sekä säilyttää minulle uskotut palvelussalaisuudet. Tahdon olla suora ja auttavainen myös palvelustovereitani kohtaan. Milloinkaan en sukulaisuuden, ystävyyden, kateuden, vihan tai pelon vuoksi enkä myöskään lahjojen tai muun syyn tähden toimi vastoin palvelusvelvollisuuttani. Jos minut asetetaan esimiesasemaan, tahdon olla alaisiani kohtaan oikeudenmukainen, pitää huolta heidän hyvinvoinnistaan, hankkia tietoa heidän toiveistaan, olla heidän neuvonantajanaan ja ohjaajanaan sekä omasta puolestani pyrkiä olemaan heille hyvänä ja kannustavana esimerkkinä. Kaiken tämän minä tahdon kunniani ja omantuntoni mukaan täyttää.

=== Swedish text ===
Jag N.N. lovar och försäkrar inför Gud den allsmäktige och allvetande (i försäkran: på heder och samvete) att vara en pålitlig medborgare, trogen Finland. Jag vill tjäna mitt land uppriktigt och med all min förmåga eftersträva och främja dess väl och bästa. Jag ska alltid, såväl i fred som i krig, försvara mitt fosterland, dess lagliga statsskick och landets lagliga överhöghet. Om jag märker eller får veta något som är i görningen för att störta landets lagliga överhöghet eller för att upphäva landets statsskick ska jag genast meddela myndigheterna detta. Jag viker inte i något läge från min trupp eller från min post, utan så länge jag har krafter ska jag fullgöra mitt uppdrag. Jag lovar att uppföra mig redbart och rakryggat, att lyda mina överordnade, följa lagar och förordningar samt bevara tjänstehemligheter som anförtrotts mig. Jag ska också vara rättfram och hjälpsam mot mina kamrater i tjänst. Jag ska aldrig bryta mot min tjänsteplikt, varken på grund av släktskap, vänskap, avund, ovänskap eller fruktan eller på grund av gåvor eller av annan orsak. Om jag får i uppgift att leda andra ska jag vara rättvis mot dem, se till deras välbefinnande, informera mig om deras önskemål, vara deras rådgivare och handledare och själv vara ett gott och sporrande föredöme. Allt detta vill jag göra på heder och samvete.

=== English translation ===
I, (name), promise and affirm before the almighty and all-knowing God (in affirmation: by my honor and by my conscience), that I am a trustworthy and faithful citizen of the realm of Finland. I want to serve my country honestly and, to my best ability, seek and pursue her edification and advantage. I want everywhere and in every situation, during the peace and during the war, defend the inviolability of my fatherland, her legal system of government and the legal authority of the realm. If I perceive or gain knowledge of activity to overthrow the legal authority or to subvert the system of government of the country, I want to report it to the authorities without delay. The unit to which I belong and my place in it I will not desert in any situation, but so long as I have strength in me, I will completely fulfill the task I have received. I promise to act properly and uprightly, obey my superiors, comply with the laws and decrees and keep the service secrets trusted in me. I want to be forthright and helpful to my fellow servicemen. Never will I due to kinship, friendship, envy, hatred or fear nor because of gifts or any other reason act contrary to my duty in service. If I be given a position of superiority, I want to be rightful to my subordinates, to take care of their well-being, acquire information on their wishes, to be their councilor and guide and, for my own self, set them a good and encouraging example. All this I want to fulfill according to my honor and my conscience.

== See also ==
- Estonian Defence Forces military oath
- United States Armed Forces oath of enlistment
- Ceremonial oath of the Bundeswehr
