= So help me God =

Phrase often used to give an oath

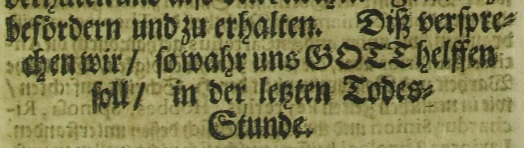
“This we promise—so help us God—in our final hour of death.” (Concluding phrase of the Hamburg Religious Declaration, 1690)

"So help me God" is a phrase often used to give an oath, sometimes optionally as part of an oath of office. It is used in some jurisdictions as an oath for performing a public duty, such as an appearance in court. The phrase implies greater care than usual in the truthfulness of one's testimony or in the performance of one's duty.

The word help in so help me God is in the subjunctive mood, not the imperative.

== Australia ==
In Australia, the Oath of Allegiance is available in two forms, one of which contains the phrase "So help me God!"

== Canada ==
In Canada, the Oath of Office, Oath of Allegiance, and Oath of Members of the Privy Council may be sworn, and end in "So help me God." They may also be solemnly affirmed, and in such case the phrase is omitted.

== Fiji ==
The Constitution of Fiji, Chapter 17 requires this phrase for the oath of allegiance, and before service to the republic from the President's office or Vice-President's office, a ministerial position, or a judicial position.

== New Zealand ==
In New Zealand, the Oath of Allegiance is available in English or Māori in two forms, one an oath containing the phrase 'so help me God' and the other an affirmation which does not. The Police Act 1958 and Oaths Modernisation Bill 2005 still includes the phrase.

== United Kingdom ==
The Oath of Allegiance, official oath and judicial oath set out in the Promissory Oaths Act 1868 end with this phrase, and are required to be taken by various office-holders. Today, under the Oaths Act 1978, a person required by any enactment to swear an oath may make an an affirmation instead, omitting "words of imprecation or calling to witness" (i.e. invoking God). The 1978 Act also provides that the lack of religious belief of the person swearing an oath does not affect its validity.

== United States ==
The phrase "So help me God" is prescribed in oaths as early as the Judiciary Act of 1789, for U.S. officers other than the President. The act makes the semantic distinction between an affirmation and an oath. The oath, religious in essence, includes the phrase "so help me God" and "[I] swear". The affirmation uses "[I] affirm". Both serve the same purpose and are described as one (i.e. "... solemnly swear, or affirm, that ...")

In the United States, the No Religious Test Clause states that "no religious test shall ever be required as a qualification to any office or public trust under the United States." Still, there are federal oaths which do include the phrase "So help me God", such as for justices and judges in 28 U.S.C. § 453.

=== Presidential oath ===
There is no law that requires Presidents to add the words "So help me God" at the end of the oath (or to use a Bible); some historians maintain that George Washington himself added the phrase to the end of his first oath, setting a precedent for future presidents and continuing what was already established practice in his day and that all Presidents since have used this phrase, according to Marvin Pinkert, then executive director of the National Archives Experience and current chief curator of the Jewish Museum of Maryland. Many other historians reject this story given that "it was not until 65 years after the event that the story that Washington added this phrase first appeared in a published volume" and other witnesses, who were present for the event, did not cite him as having added the phrase. These historians further note that "we have no convincing contemporary evidence that any president said "so help me God" until September 1881, when Chester A. Arthur took the oath after the death of James A. Garfield." It is demonstrable, however, that those historians are in error regarding their claim that there is no "contemporary evidence" of a president saying "so help me God" until 1881. Richard Gardiner's research published in the White House History Quarterly, November 2024, offers contemporary evidence for presidents who used the phrase going back to William Henry Harrison in 1841, and Andrew Jackson.

=== Oath of citizenship ===
The United States Oath of Citizenship (officially referred to as the "Oath of Allegiance", 8 C.F.R. Part 337 (2008)), taken by all immigrants who wish to become United States citizens, includes the phrase "so help me God"; however 8 CFR 337.1 provides that the phrase is optional.

=== Military ===
The Enlistment oath and officer's Oath of Office both contain this phrase. A change in October 2013 to Air Force Instruction 36-2606 made it mandatory to include the phrase during Air Force enlistments/reenlistments. This change has made the instruction "consistent with the language mandated in 10 USC 502". The Air Force announced on September 17, 2014, that it revoked this previous policy change, allowing anyone to omit "so help me God" from the oath.

=== State laws ===
Some of the states have specified that the words "so help me God" were used in oath of office, and also required of jurors, witnesses in court, notaries public, and state employees. Alabama, Connecticut, Delaware, Kentucky, Louisiana, Maine, Mississippi, New Mexico, North Carolina, Texas, and Virginia retain the required "so help me God" as part of the oath to public office. Historically, Maryland and South Carolina did include it but both have been successfully challenged in court. Other states, such as New Hampshire, North Dakota and Rhode Island allow exceptions or alternative phrases. In Wisconsin, the specific language of the oath has been repealed.

== Equivalent in other languages ==
=== Croatian ===
In Croatia, the text of presidential oath, which is defined by the Presidential Elections Act amendments of 1997 (Article 4), ends with "Tako mi Bog pomogao" (So help me God).

In 2009, concerns about the phrase infringing on Constitution of Croatia were raised. Constitutional Court of Croatia ruled them out in 2017, claiming that it is compatible with constitution and secular state. The court said the phrase is in neither direct nor indirect relation to any religious beliefs of the elected president. It does not represent a theist or religious belief and does not stop the president in any way from expressing any other religious belief. Saying the phrase while taking the presidential oath does not force a certain belief on the President and does not infringe on their religious freedoms.

=== Dutch ===
In the inauguration of Dutch monarchs, the phrase "zo waarlijk helpe mij God Almachtig" ("So help me God Almighty") is used at the conclusion of the monarch's oath.

=== Filipino ===
In the Oath of Office of the President of the Philippines, the phrase "So help me God" (Filipino: Kasihan nawâ akó ng Diyos) is mandatory in oaths. An affirmation, however, has exactly the same legal effect as an oath.

=== French ===
In medieval France, tradition held that when the Duke of Brittany or other royalty entered the city of Rennes, they would proclaim Et qu'ainsi Dieu me soit en aide ("And so help me God").

=== German ===
==== Germany ====
The phrase So wahr mir Gott helfe (literally "as true as God may help me") is an optional part in oaths of office prescribed for civil servants, soldiers, judges as well as members and high representatives of the federal and state governments such as the Federal President, Federal Chancellor and the Minister Presidents. Parties and witnesses in criminal and civil proceedings may also be placed under oath with this phrase. In such proceedings, the judge first speaks the words "You swear [by God Almighty and All-Knowing] that to the best of your knowledge you have spoken the pure truth and not concealed anything." The witness or party then must answer I swear it [, so help me God]." The words in brackets are included or omitted according to the preference of the person placed under oath. If the person concerned raises a conscientious objection against any kind of oath, the judge may speak the words "Aware of your responsibility in court, you affirm that to the best of your knowledge you have spoken the pure truth and not concealed anything", to which the person needs to reply "Yes". Both forms of the oath and the affirmation carry the same penalty, if the person is found to have lied. Contrary to the oath without a religious phrase, this kind of affirmation is not necessarily available outside court proceedings (e.g. for an oath of office).

==== Austria ====
The traditional oath of witnesses in Austrian courts ends with the phrase so wahr mir Gott helfe. There are, however, exemptions for witnesses of different religious denominations as well as those unaffiliated with any religion. The oath is rarely practised in civil trials and was completely abolished for criminal procedure in 2008. The phrase so wahr mir Gott helfe is also an (optional) part in the oath of surveyors who testify as expert witnesses as well as court-certified interpreters. Unlike in Germany, the phrase so wahr mir Gott helfe is not part of the oath of office of the Federal President, members of the federal government or state governors, who may or may not add a religious imprecation after the form of oath prescribed by the constitution.

=== Polish ===
The Polish phrase is Tak mi dopomóż Bóg or Tak mi, Boże, dopomóż. It has been used in most version of the Polish Army oaths, however other denominations use different phrases. President, prime minister, deputy prime ministers, ministers and members of both houses of parliament can add this phrase at the end of the oath of their office.

=== Romanian ===
In Romania, the oath is Așa să-mi ajute Dumnezeu!, which is used in various ceremonies such as the ministers' oath in front of the president of the republic or the magistrates' oath.

== Other ==
=== Kanye West ===
An unreleased album named So Help Me God was worked on between fall of 2014 and spring of 2015, and was slated for release in March of that year, but it ended up being reworked into his 2016 album, The Life of Pablo.
