= Ulster Defence Volunteers =

The Ulster Defence Volunteers (UDV) and later the Ulster Home Guard were a force recruited by the Government of Northern Ireland to perform the role of the Home Guard in Northern Ireland during World War II. The UDV was recruited following the formation of the Home Guard in Britain around May 1940.

Due to concerns about the possibility of inadvertently training Irish republicans, the UDV was formed from members of the Ulster Special Constabulary (USC) (also known as the 'B' Specials during the period) rather than volunteers from all sections of the community as in the rest of the United Kingdom.

== Genesis of the force ==
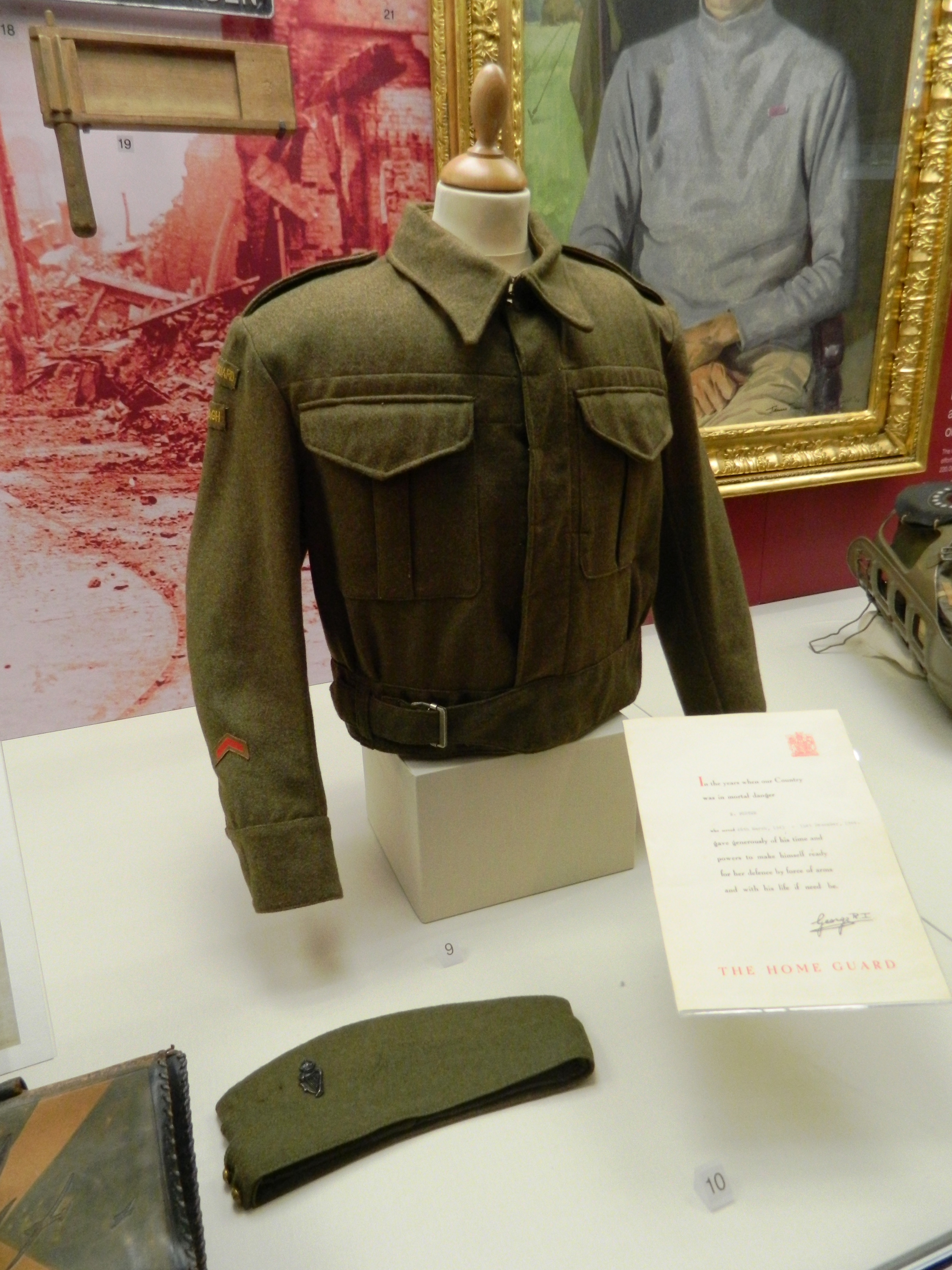
County Fermanagh Home Guard uniform, Ulster Museum

The Prime Minister of Northern Ireland, James Craig, 1st Viscount Craigavon, told his cabinet in May 1940 before a force like the Home Guard could take place, problems had to be addressed;

"There were grave objections... to the establishment here of a local Volunteer Defence Corps, on the basis adopted in Britain."

The grave objections Craigavon spoke about were the opportunities that a British style Home Guard might have afforded Roman Catholics to legally carry weapons. The view of then Northern Ireland Minister of Public Security John MacDermott was that:

"It is most important that the [British] Army should not become involved in political differences. At the same time it is equally important that weapons should not get into the hands of undesirable elements, and that the latter should not get a foothold in our military machine. It is difficult for the Army to differentiate. At present it is best done for them by the Constabulary on the best information."

Craigavon sought advice about a local version of a regional defence force, from his old friend and British Prime Minister Winston Churchill on 23 May 1940. Churchill had confided to his friend Richard Pim after the retreat from Dunkirk that the 'B' Specials were the only properly armed and disciplined force left in the United Kingdom. He gave Craigavon the go ahead to recruit the force. On his return to Northern Ireland, Craigavon, who died six months later, was able to tell his cabinet that Churchill recognised;

"the voluntary effort that had been made in Ulster [Northern Ireland] to keep the various Ulster units of the Army up to strength."

== Formation ==
The UDV was formed from members of the Ulster Special Constabulary 'B' Specials on 28 May 1940. The UDV members were recruited by the Government of Northern Ireland and the force was not under the control of the British Army in Northern Ireland (BTNI). Unlike in Britain, where the Home Guard were administered through their county Territorial Army Associations and swore a military oath of allegiance to the Crown, the UDV were Special Constables. As such the initial official name was the "Local Defence Volunteers Section, Ulster Special Constabulary".

The UDV was eventually formed into the Ulster Home Guard administered through the Royal Ulster Constabulary (RUC). As such they were a paramilitary force unprotected by the Geneva Conventions.

This brought the defences of Northern Ireland up to:

- 3,000 Royal Ulster Constabulary
- 12,000 'B' Specials
- 12,000 UDV

When the UDV's in Northern Ireland were reformed as the Ulster Home Guard in 1942 under military command they were issued uniforms, although units of USC were retained in the cities of Belfast and Derry to help the RUC with the large concentrated numbers of civilian population. In these two cities specific Home Guard units were also raised.

== Sectarianism ==
There were problems in recruitment from the minority Roman Catholic population in Northern Ireland however. While no figures exist on the number who attempted to join the UDV and Home Guard the view was that their recruitment was generally discouraged. In November 1942 there was only 150 Catholics in the UDV out of a total of force of 40,000. The view of John MacDermott was that a few Catholics did enlist but that:

"virtually all left because they hated the "B" Specials."

he went on to say that:

"the "B's" were only bad in parts- the Home Guard was quite sectarian but this was largely the fault of the minority [the Catholics] for not joining."

== Duties ==
The duties which accompanied this new role included opposition to airborne invasion and fifth columnists, taken to be in the guise of the IRA. Northern Ireland was considered a unique area as a major armed group pledged to insurrection and overthrow of the state did not exist in Great Britain. German airborne landings were a major fear of both the British government and the government in Northern Ireland. The governments in London, Dublin and Belfast were to co-operate in a secret plan for a joint response to a German invasion of Ireland, Plan W.

Some members of the UDV (and later the Home Guard) underwent training in sabotage and guerilla fighting as part of these plans.

== See also ==
- Belfast Blitz
- Irish Republican Army–Abwehr collaboration – Main article on IRA Nazi links
- Operation Green
- Plan Kathleen
- The Emergency
