= Military oath =

Oath taken on enlistment into a military force

New U.S. military recruits taking an oath of enlistment at a MEPS facility.

A military oath, also known as the oath of enlistment or swearing-in, is an oath delivered by a conscript or volunteer upon enlisting into the state's armed forces. Various states have different phrasings of the oath, with the common component being the fidelity to the state and obedience to the superior officers. In the ancient times it was a very solemn procedure. In modern times, with many formal laws and regulations to maintain army discipline, it is still a solemn, but rather a formal event.

== See also ==
- Contemporary military oaths
  - Estonia
  - Finland
  - Germany
  - Poland
  - United States
- Sacramentum
- Hittite military oath
- Oath of allegiance
- Oath of office
- Schwurhand
