= United States Armed Forces oath of enlistment =

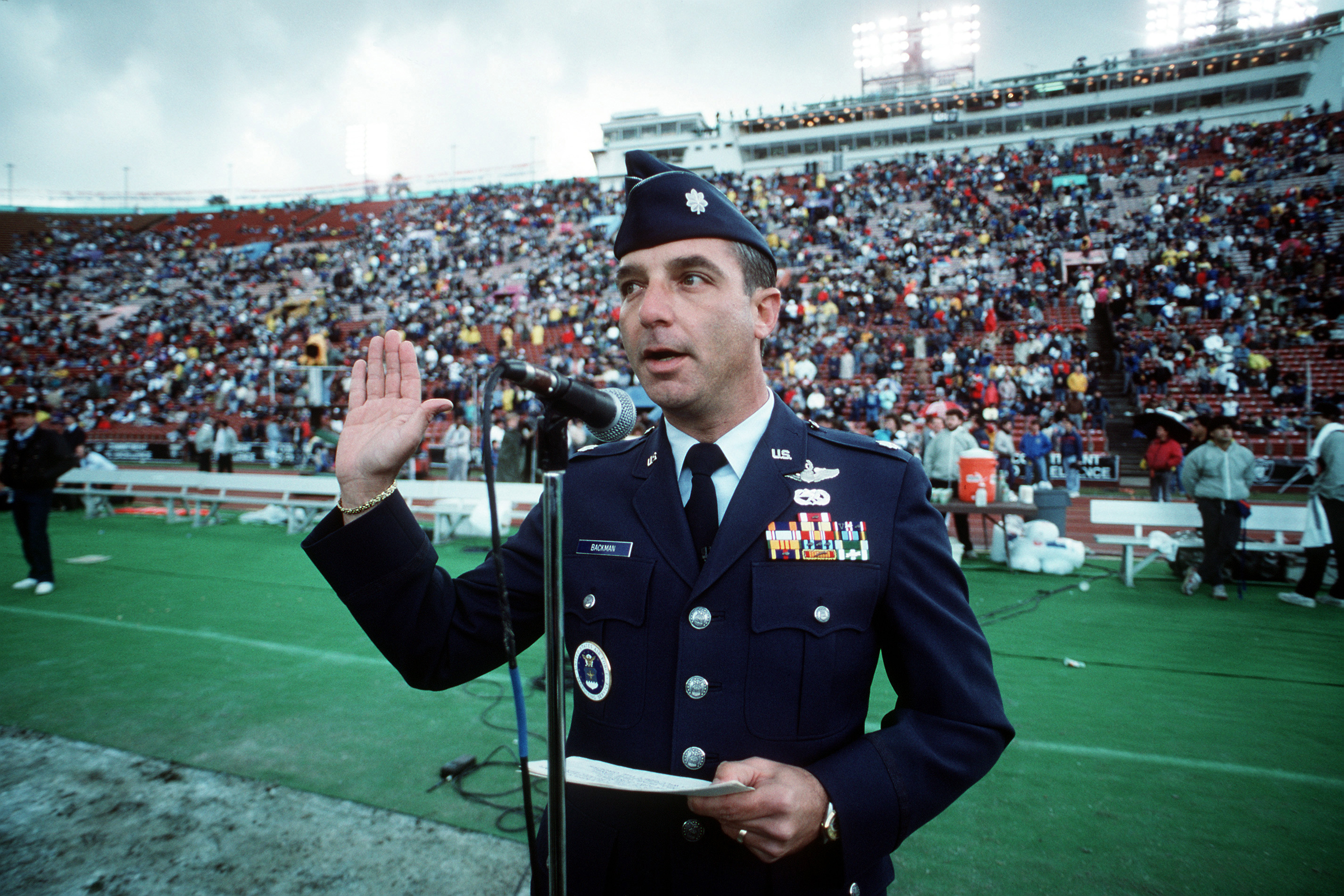
An Air Force lieutenant colonel administering the oath to a group of 150 enlistees (not pictured) at the Los Angeles Coliseum, 1988.

U.S. military recruits at a MEPS station taking the oath, 2026.

A Marine re-enlisting in the Marine Corps by taking the oath of enlistment

A soldier of United States Army Europe taking the oath on Red Square prior to the 2010 Moscow Victory Day Parade

The oath of enlistment is a military oath made by members of the United States Armed Forces who enlist.

== Description ==
Upon enlisting in the United States Armed Forces, each person enlisting in an armed force (whether a soldier, Marine, sailor, airman, or Coast Guardsman) takes an oath of enlistment required by federal statute in 10 U.S.C. § 502. That section provides the text of the oath and sets out who may administer the oath:

§ 502. Enlistment oath: who may administer

(a) Enlistment Oath.— Each person enlisting in an armed force shall take the following oath:

I, (state name of enlistee), do solemnly swear (or affirm) that I will support and defend the Constitution of the United States against all enemies, foreign and domestic; that I will bear true faith and allegiance to the same; and that I will obey the orders of the President of the United States and the orders of the officers appointed over me, according to regulations and the Uniform Code of Military Justice. (So help me God)."

Or, if enlisting in the National Guard:

I, (state name of enlistee), do solemnly swear (or affirm) that I will support and defend the Constitution of the United States and of the State of (applicable state) against all enemies, foreign and domestic; that I will bear true faith and allegiance to them; and that I will obey the orders of the President of the United States and the Governor of (applicable state) and the orders of the officers appointed over me, according to law and regulations. (So help me God)."

(b) Who May Administer.— The oath may be taken before the President, the Vice-President, the Secretary of Defense, any commissioned officer, or any other person designated under regulations prescribed by the Secretary of Defense.

Army Regulation 601-210, Active and Reserve Components Enlistment Program provides that:

A commissioned officer of any service will administer the Oath of Enlistment in DD Form 4 orally, in English, to each application. Make a suitable arrangement to ensure that the oath is administered in a dignified manner and in proper surroundings. Display the U.S. flag prominently near the officer giving the oath. The words "So help me God" may be omitted for persons who desire to affirm rather than to swear to the oath.

There is no duration defined in the oath itself. The term of service for each enlisted person is written on the DD Form 4 series, the contract which specifies the active-duty or reserve enlistment period. For a first-time enlistee, this varies from two to six years, which can be a combination of active duty and time spent in a reserve component, although enlisted reservists are subject to activation until the end of the eight-year initial military obligation.

Officers do not take the same oath as enlisted personnel, instead taking a similar United States Uniformed Services Oath of Office.

== See also ==
- Ceremonial oath of the Bundeswehr
- United States Uniformed Services Oath of Office
- Oath of the Chinese Militia
