= William Foster (British Army officer) =

Recipient of the George Cross

- Born: 12 December 1880; At sea
- Died: 13 September 1942 (aged 61); Clarendon Park, Wiltshire
- Military career
- Allegiance: United Kingdom
- Branch: British Army
- Service years: 1900–1920; 1940–1942
- Rank: Captain
- Conflicts: Second Boer War; First World War; Second World War
- Awards: George Cross; Military Cross; Distinguished Conduct Medal; Mentioned in Despatches

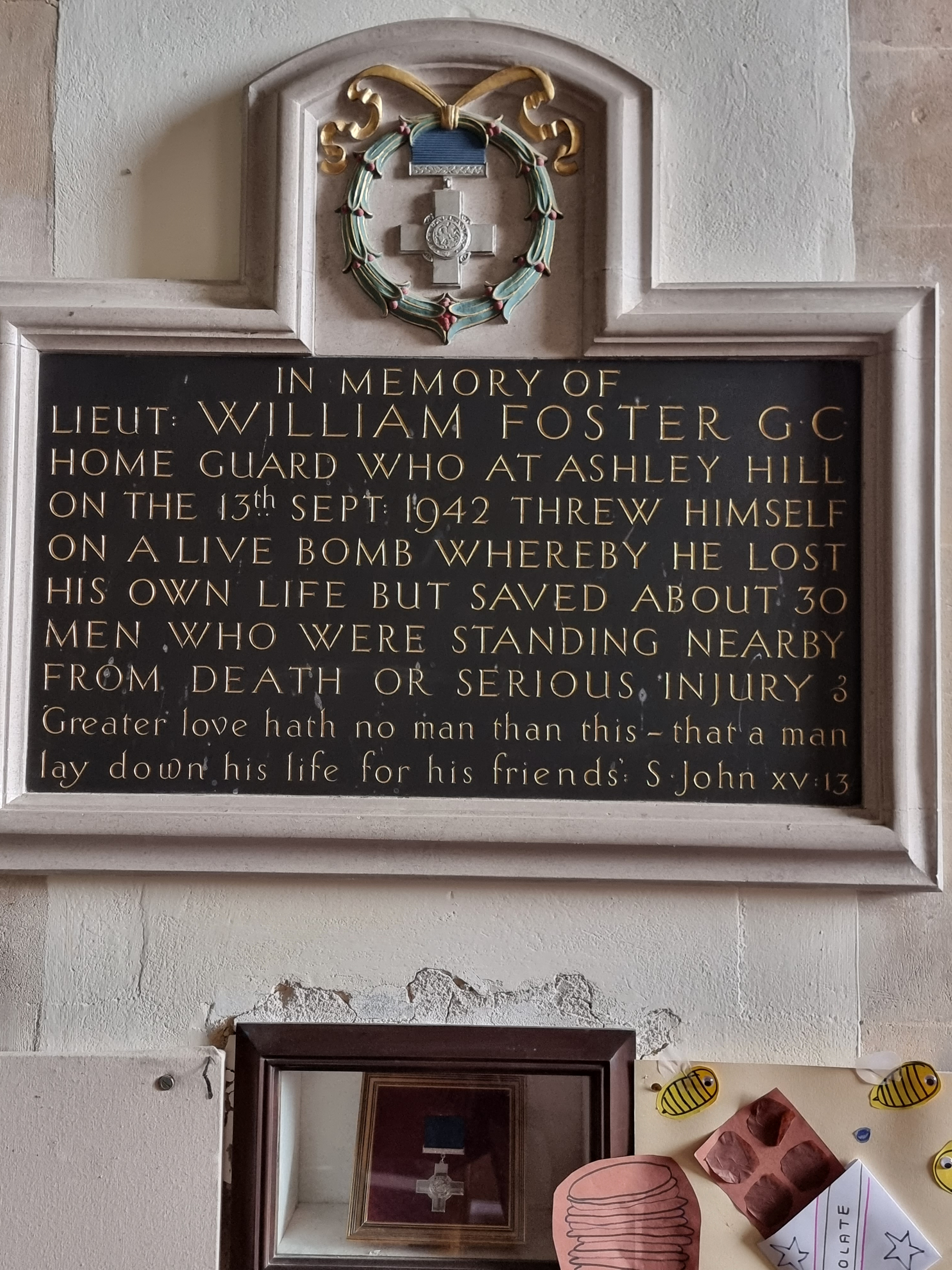
Lt W. G. Foster Memorial Tablet, Alderbury

William George Foster, GC, MC, DCM (12 December 1880 – 13 September 1942) was a British Home Guard officer who was posthumously awarded the George Cross for the heroism he displayed on 13 September 1942 when his prompt actions saved his comrades after a grenade accident during training in Ashley Hill, Clarendon Park near Salisbury in Wiltshire. In protecting his comrades from death or severe injury his own life was lost.

He was born at sea on 12 December 1880 and served in the Boer War with the Royal Fusiliers and the Imperial Light Horse, returning to Britain after being seriously wounded. He was medically discharged in 1902, but rejoined the army during the First World War. He served with the 4th Battalion, Royal Fusiliers and fought at Mons and Ypres, being mentioned in despatches three times. He won the Distinguished Conduct Medal in 1915 and the Military Cross in 1916 while serving with the 3rd Battalion, Royal Fusiliers. He was commissioned in 1916 and retired in 1920 as a captain.

In the Second World War he joined the 7th Wiltshire (Salisbury) Battalion of the Home Guard as a lieutenant. On the 13th of September 1942 Foster threw himself on a piece of live ordnance about to explode, he perished in the following explosion but through his sacrifice he saved 30 men from harm or death. Notice of his citation was published in the London Gazette of 27 November 1942.

== Sources ==
- George Cross database: W G Foster
