= Estonian Defence Forces military oath =

Military oath in the Estonian Defence Forces is taken by conscripts or professional soldiers in the end of their basic training (10 weeks). The oath is also given by volunteers of the Estonian Defence League, when they complete their basic training (5 weekends).

The oath ceremony is held either at the garrison or in another symbolic place, for example the Guard Battalion gives their oath in location of the Battle of Sõjamäe. The relatives of the conscript's are usually invited to attend the ceremony. The person taking the oath of serviceman has to sign the text of the oath, noting also the date of taking the oath.

== Current oath and affirmation text ==
=== Estonian text ===
Mina, (ees- ja perekonnanimi), tõotan jääda ustavaks demokraatlikule Eesti Vabariigile ja tema põhiseaduslikule korrale, kaitsta Eesti Vabariiki vaenlase vastu kogu oma mõistuse ja jõuga, olla valmis ohverdama oma elu isamaa eest, pidada kinni kaitseväe distsipliinist ning täpselt ja vastuvaidlematult täita kõiki oma kohustusi, pidades meeles, et vastasel korral seadus mind rangelt karistab.

=== English translation ===
I, (given name and surname), swear to remain faithful to the democratic Republic of Estonia and its constitutional order, to defend the Republic of Estonia against enemies with all my reason and strength, to be ready to sacrifice my life for the fatherland, to observe the discipline of the Defence Forces, and to perform all my duties precisely and unquestioningly, bearing in mind that otherwise I will be strictly punished by law.

== Oath in 1922-1940 ==
=== Estonian text ===
Mina tõotan ustavaks jääda Eesti demokraatlikule Vabariigile ja tema seaduslikule valitsusele, kaitsta Eesti Vabariiki vaenlaste vastu kõige oma mõistuse ja jõuga, igal ajal valmis olles lahingutes langenud kangelaste eeskujul riigi kasuks oma elu ohverdama, kindlasti pidada sõjaväe distsipliini ja tõrkumata ning täpipealt täita kõiki oma kohuseid, meeles pidades, et vastasel korral seadus mind raskesti karistab.

=== English translation ===
I swear to remain faithful to the democratic Republic of Estonia and its legitimate government, to defend the Republic of Estonia against enemies with all my reason and strength, to be ready at all times to sacrifice my life for the good of the country, following the example of the heroes who have fallen in battle, to observe strict military discipline and to perform all my duties without reluctance and to the letter, bearing in mind that otherwise I will be severely punished by the law.

== See also ==
- Finnish Defence Forces military oath
- Ceremonial oath of the Bundeswehr
