= Home Guard (United Kingdom) =

1940–1944 British Army auxiliary defence force

Home Guard Initially "Local Defence Volunteers"
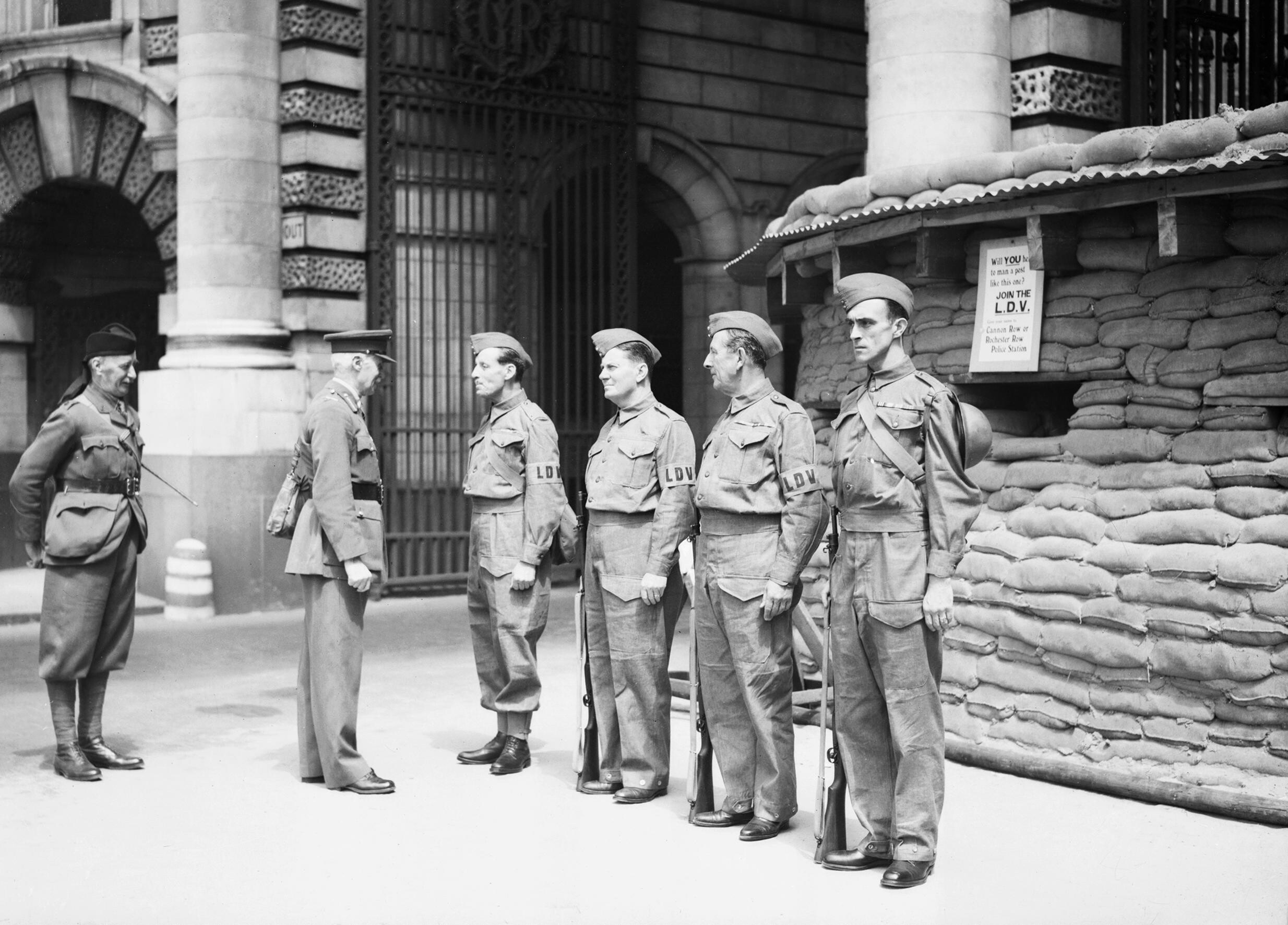
- Home Guard post at Admiralty Arch in central London, 21 June 1940
- Active: 14 May 1940 – 3 December 1944
- Disbanded: 31 December 1945
- Country: United Kingdom
- Branch: British Army
- Type: Volunteer militia
- Role: Defence from invasion

Commanders
- Notable commanders: Sir Edmund Ironside

The Home Guard (initially Local Defence Volunteers or LDV) was an unpaid armed citizen militia supporting the 'Home Forces' of the British Army during the Second World War. Operational from 1940 to 1944, the Home Guard comprised more than 1.5 million local volunteers otherwise ineligible for military service, such as those who were too young, too old or medically unfit to join the regular armed services (regular military service was restricted to those aged 18 to 41) and those in reserved occupations. Excluding those already in the armed services, the civilian police or other civil defence volunteer organisations, approximately one in five men were Home Guard volunteers. Their primary role was to act as a secondary defence force in their home locality in case of invasion by the forces of Nazi Germany.

The Home Guard were initially ordered to observe, and report back to GHQ Home Forces, any airborne or seaborne invading forces in their local area; an order extended subsequently to harassing and obstructing the advance of the enemy even by a few hours to give the regular troops time to regroup. They were also tasked with guarding and defending key transport intersections and factories in rear areas against possible capture by paratroops or fifth columnists. An additional prime purpose was to maintain control of the civilian population in the event of an invasion, to forestall panic and to prevent communication routes from being blocked by refugees; so as to free the regular forces to fight the Germans. During the German bombing campaign of 'The Blitz' they were given the duty of seeking out and guarding unexploded bombs, in the course of which over 1,000 were killed. From 1942, the Home Guard manned coastal artillery and anti-aircraft gun and rocket batteries, releasing regular soldiers for the invasion of Europe. The Home Guard continued to man observation points and roadblocks, and to guard coastal areas of the United Kingdom and other strategically important sites such as airfields, factories and explosives stores, until late 1944, when they were stood down. They were formally disbanded on 31 December 1945, eight months after Germany's surrender.

Men aged 17 to 65 years could join, although the age limits were not strictly enforced. One platoon had a fourteen year old and three men in their eighties enrolled in it. Service was unpaid (although out-of-pocket expenses could be claimed) but gave a chance for older or inexperienced soldiers to support the war effort.

== Background ==
=== Early ideas for a home defence force prior to the Second World War ===
The origins of the Second World War Home Guard can be traced to Captain Tom Wintringham, who returned from the Spanish Civil War and wrote a book entitled How to Reform the Army. In the book, as well as many regular army reforms, Wintringham called for the creation of 12 divisions similar in composition to that of the International Brigades, which had been formed in Spain during the conflict. The divisions would be raised by voluntary enlistment targeting ex-servicemen and youths. Despite great interest by the War Office in the book's assertion that 'security is possible', Wintringham's call to train 100,000 men immediately was not implemented.

== Establishing a home defence force ==
When the United Kingdom declared war on Germany on 3 September 1939, debates began in official circles about the possible ways in which the German military might invade Britain. In the first week of the conflict, numerous diplomatic and intelligence reports seemed to indicate that there was the possibility of an imminent German amphibious assault. Many government ministers and senior army officials, including the Commander in Chief Home Forces, General Walter Kirke, believed that the threat of invasion was greatly exaggerated and were sceptical, but others were not, including Winston Churchill, the new First Lord of the Admiralty.

Churchill argued that some form of home defence force should be raised from people who were ineligible to serve in the regular forces but wished to serve their country. In a letter to Samuel Hoare, the Lord Privy Seal, on 8 October 1939, Churchill called for a Home Guard force of 500,000 men over the age of 40 to be formed.

=== Early local grassroots formation of home defence forces ===
While government officials were debating the need for a home defence force, such forces were actually forming themselves without any official encouragement. In Essex, men not eligible for call-up into the armed forces were coming forward to join the self-styled "Legion of Frontiersmen". Officials were soon informed of the development of the legion, with the Adjutant-General, Sir Robert Gordon-Finlayson, arguing that the government should encourage the development of more unofficial organisations. The fear of invasion in 1939 quickly dissipated as it became evident that the German military was not in a position to launch an invasion of Britain; official enthusiasm for home defence forces waned and the legion appears to have dissolved itself at the same time.

The Battle of France began on 10 May 1940, with the Wehrmacht invading Belgium, the Netherlands and France. By 20 May, German forces had reached the English Channel, and on 28 May, the Belgian Army surrendered. The combination of the large-scale combined operations mounted by the Wehrmacht during the invasion of Norway in April and the prospect that much of the English Channel coast would soon be occupied made the prospect of a German invasion of the British Isles alarmingly real. Fears of an invasion grew rapidly, spurred on by reports both in the press and from official government bodies, of a fifth column operating in Britain that would aid an invasion by German airborne forces.

=== Increasing pressure on Government to form a home defence force ===
The government soon found itself under increasing pressure to extend the internment of suspect aliens to prevent the formation of a fifth column and to allow the population to take up arms to defend themselves against an invasion. Calls for some form of home defence force soon began to be heard from the press and from private individuals. The press baron Lord Kemsley privately proposed to the War Office that rifle clubs form the nucleus of a home defence force, and Josiah Wedgwood, a Labour MP, wrote to the prime minister asking that the entire adult population be trained in the use of arms and given weapons to defend themselves. Similar calls appeared in newspaper columns: in the 12 May issue of the Sunday Express, a brigadier called on the government to issue free arms licences and permits to buy ammunition to men possessing small arms, and the same day, the Sunday Pictorial asked if the government had considered training golfers in rifle shooting to eliminate stray parachutists.

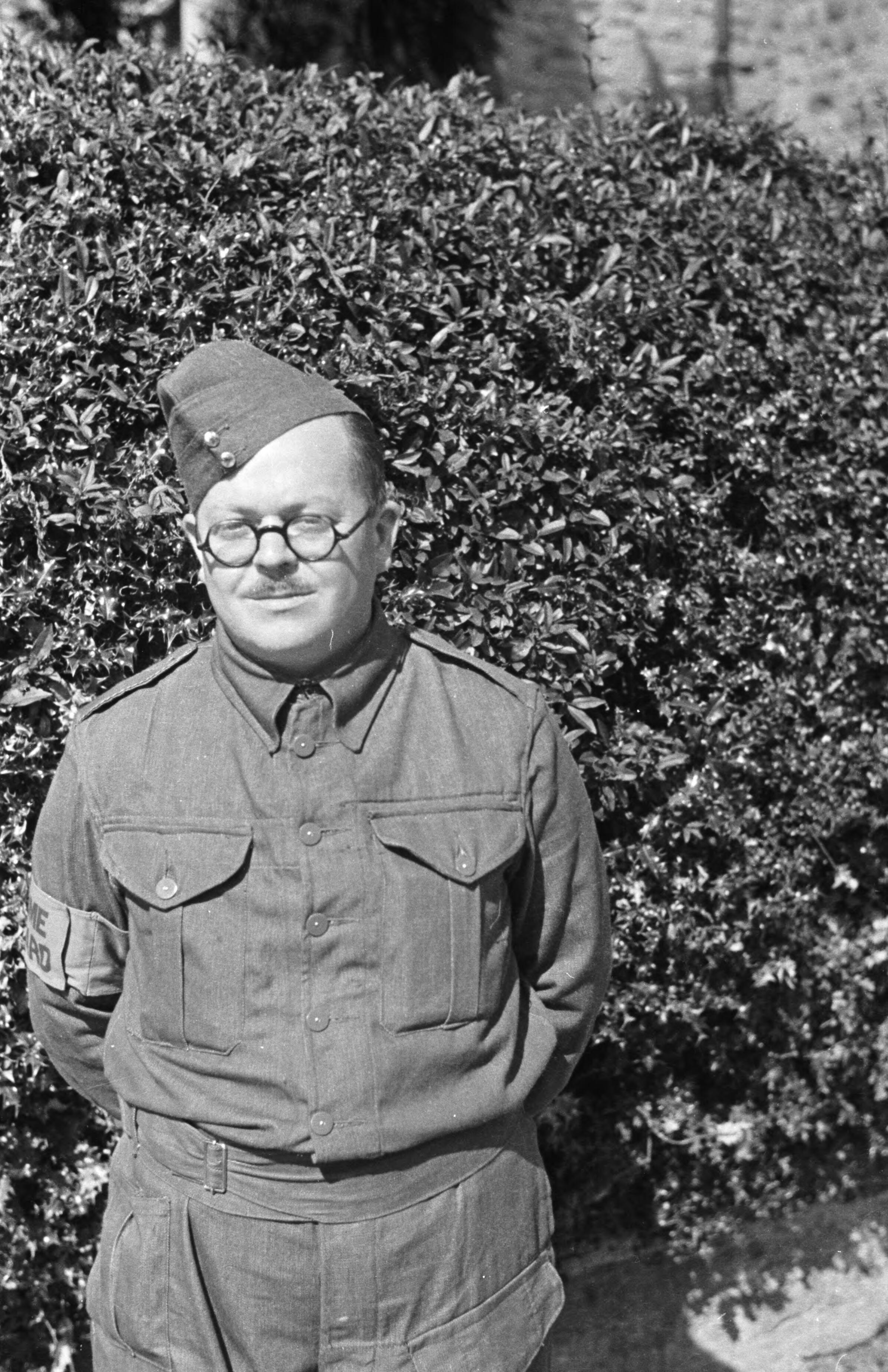
A member of a Montgomeryshire Home Guard unit in 1941

The calls alarmed government and senior military officials, who worried about the prospect of the population forming private defence forces that the army would not be able to control, and in mid-May, the Home Office issued a press release on the matter. It was the task of the army to deal with enemy parachutists, as any civilians who carried weapons and fired on German troops were likely to be executed if captured. Moreover, any lone parachutist descending from the skies in the summer of 1940 was far more likely to be a downed RAF airman than a German Fallschirmjäger.

Nevertheless, private defence forces soon began to be formed throughout the country, often sponsored by employers seeking to bolster defence of their factories. This placed the government in an awkward position. The private forces, which the army might not be able to control, could well inhibit the army's efforts during an invasion, but to ignore the calls for a home defence force to be set up would be politically problematic. An officially-sponsored home defence force would allow the government greater control and also allow for greater security around vulnerable areas such as munitions factories and airfields; but there was some confusion over who would form and control the force, with separate plans being drawn up by the War Office for a small units of volunteer defenders attached to the existing regular searchlight companies; and by General Headquarters Home Forces under General Kirke for more loosely-organised local bands to be raised under the authority of the Lords Lieutenant of each county.

Over Sunday 12 May 1940, the War Office and senior military officials rapidly compared plans, concluding in favour of the proposals from GHQ Home Forces; and then on 13 May 1940 worked out an improvised scheme for a home defence force, to be called the Local Defence Volunteers (LDV). There had been no consultation with other government departments that would be affected, no consultation with the Treasury over spending approval, and no consultation with the legal officers of the Crown over how volunteers might be claimed to have the legal status of members of the Armed Forces. In the rush to complete a plan and announce it to the public many administrative and logistical problems had been left unresolved, such as how the volunteers in the new force would be armed, which caused problems as the force evolved. On the evening of 14 May 1940, Secretary of State for War Anthony Eden gave a radio broadcast announcing the formation of the LDV and calling for volunteers to join the force: "You will not be paid, but you will receive a uniform and will be armed."

=== Official recognition and enlistment ===
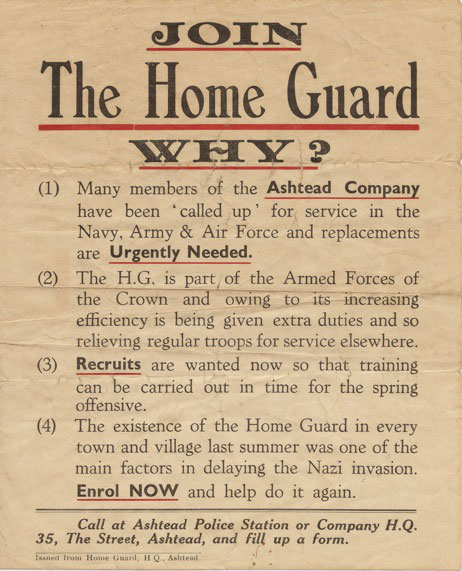
Recruitment poster for the Ashtead Home Guard

In the official radio announcement, Eden called on men between the ages of 17 and 65 years in Britain who were not in military service but wished to defend their country against paratroops in the event of an invasion to enroll in the LDV at their local police station. It was anticipated that up to 500,000 men might volunteer, a number that conformed generally with the Army's expectation of the total numbers required to fulfill the LDV's expected functions. However, the announcement was met with much enthusiasm: 250,000 volunteers tried to sign up in the first seven days, and by July this had increased to 1.5 million. Social groups such as cricket clubs began forming their own units, but the bulk were workplace-based, especially as co-operation from employers was necessary to ensure that volunteers would be available for training and operational patrols. Indeed, many employers envisaged their LDV units primarily as protecting industrial plants from fifth column and paratroop attack.

==== Women and the Home Guard ====
The Home Guard did not initially admit women as volunteers. Some women formed their own groups like the Amazon Defence Corps. In December 1941, a more organised but still unofficial Women's Home Defence (WHD) was formed under the direction of Dr Edith Summerskill, Labour MP for Fulham West. WHD members were given weapons training and basic military training. Limited female involvement in official Home Guard units was to be permitted later 'auxiliaries', on the understanding that these would be in traditional female support roles (e.g., clerical, driving) and not in any way seen as combatants.

=== Logistics and practical support issues ===
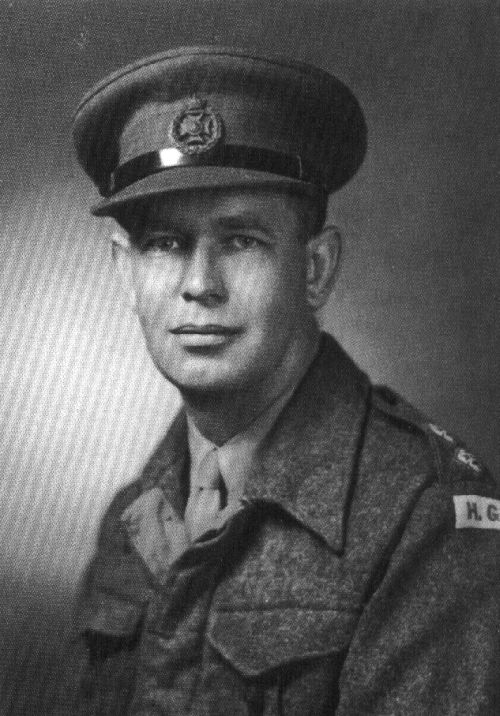
Lieutenant Percy Reginald Tucker Bermuda Home Guard (with the cap badge of the Bermuda Volunteer Rifle Corps)

The War Office continued to lay down the administrative and logistical foundations for the LDV organisation. Eden's public words were generally interpreted as an explicit promise to provide everyone who volunteered with a personal firearm. In retrospect, it was recognised that recruitment would have been better limited to the numbers required (and capable of being armed), with later volunteers given places on a waiting list. However, once volunteers had been enlisted, it was considered impossible from a public relations perspective to then dismiss them. Nevertheless, the regular forces saw no priority in providing more arms and equipment to the new force than would have been needed had numbers been properly constrained in the first place.

In telegrams to the lord lieutenants of each county it was explained that LDV units would operate in predefined military areas already used by the regular army, with a General Staff Officer coordinating with civilian regional commissioners to divide these areas into defined zones with an appointed, volunteer, leader. In London, zones were organised on the basis of police districts. On 17 May, the LDV achieved official legal status when the Privy Council issued the Defence (Local Defence Volunteers) Order in Council, and orders were issued from the War Office to regular army headquarters throughout Britain explaining the status of LDV units: volunteers would be divided into sections, platoons, companies and groups - each with an appointed volunteer leader; but none would be paid, and leaders of units would not hold commissions or have the power to command regular forces. Finance and logistics for units would be administered (within Great Britain) by County Territorial Army Associations

Implementation of the regulations proved to be extremely difficult, particularly as the primary focus of the War Office and General Headquarters Home Forces was on Operation Dynamo, the evacuation of the British Expeditionary Force from Dunkirk between 27 May and 4 June 1940. The apparent lack of focus led to many LDV members becoming impatient, particularly when it was announced that volunteers would receive only armbands printed with "L.D.V." on them until proper uniforms could be manufactured, and there was no assurance as to when weapons would be issued to units. The impatience led to many units conducting their own patrols without official permission, often led by men who had previously served in the armed forces.

The presence of many veterans and the appointment of ex-officers to command LDV units, only worsened the situation, with many believing that they did not require training before being issued weapons. That led to numerous complaints being received by the War Office and the press and to many ex-senior officers attempting to use their influence to obtain weapons or permission to begin patrolling. The issue of weapons to LDV units was particularly problematic for the War Office, as it was recognised that the rearming and re-equipping of the regular forces would have to take precedence over the LDV. Following a radio appeal on 23 May by Richard Law, Financial Secretary to the War Office, public-spirited citizens had handed over registered firearms and shotguns, the police issuing certificates allowing these to be used for LDV duties. By July 1940, over 50,000 civilian shotguns were being used by the LDV and specialised solid-ball 12-bore shot-gun ammunition was developed for units.

For public (and enemy) consumption, the government maintained that large stocks of Lee–Enfield rifles remained from the First World War, but the actual total reserve stockpile amounted to 300,000, and they had already been earmarked for the expansion of the army by 122 infantry battalions. Instead, the War Office issued instructions on how to make Molotov cocktails and emergency orders were placed for Ross rifles from Canada. In the absence of proper weapons, local units improvised weapons, especially grenades, mortars and grenade projectors, from whatever came to hand, and the legacy of self-reliant improvisation in the face of what was interpreted as official disregard and obstruction was to remain as a characteristic of the Home Guard throughout its existence.

=== Unclear role, low morale and disciplinary problems ===
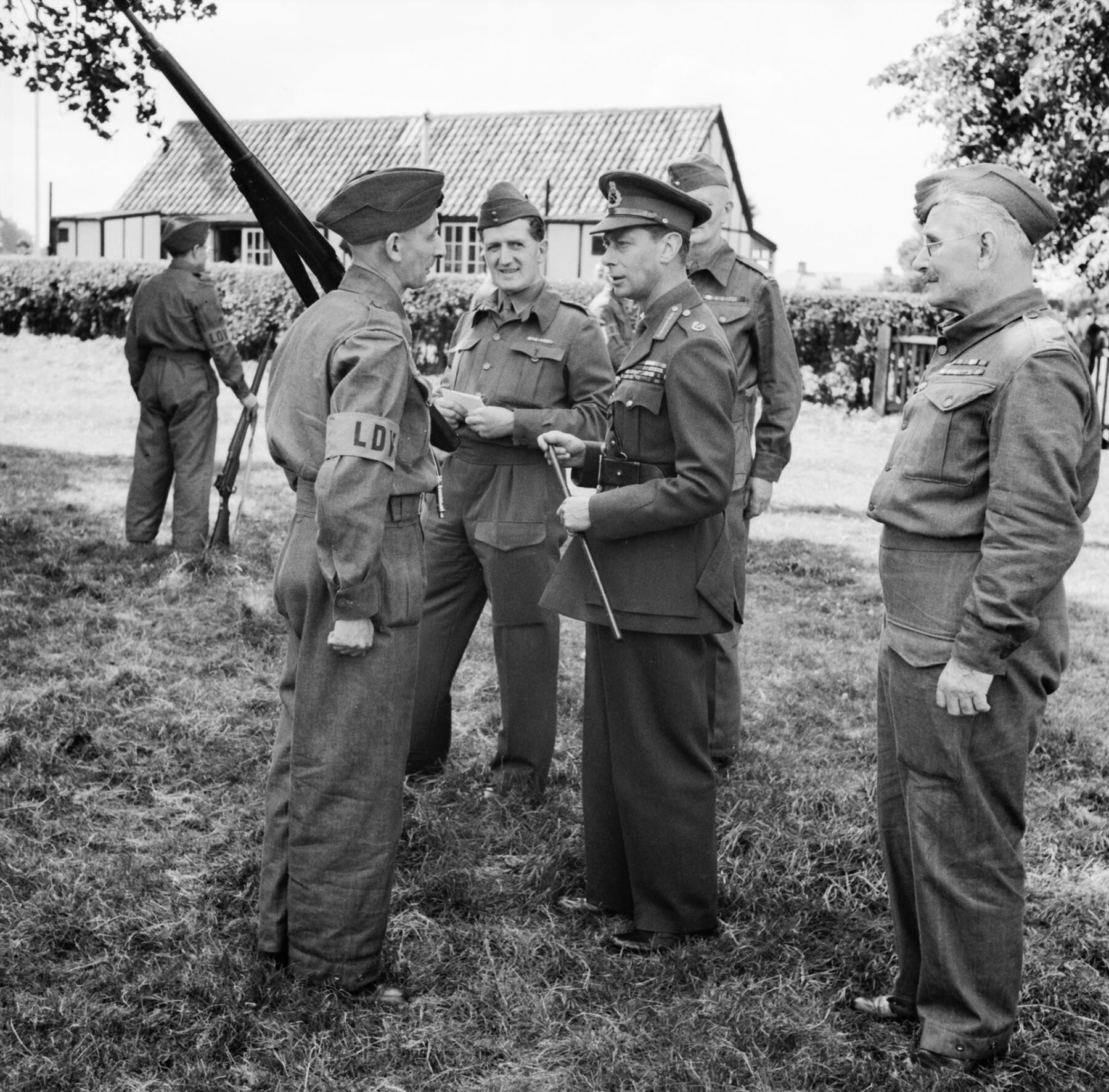
King George VI talking to a member of the Home Guard still wearing the LDV brassard, in August 1940.

Another problem that was encountered as the LDV was organised was the definition of the role the organisation was to play. Initially, in the eyes of the War Office and the army, the LDV was to act as 'an armed police constabulary', which, in the event of an invasion, was to man roadblocks, observe German troop movements, convey information to the regular forces and guard places of strategic or tactical importance. The War Office believed that the LDV would act best in such a passive role because of its lack of training, weapons and proper equipment. Such a role clashed with the expectations of LDV commanders and members who believed that the organisation would be best suited to an active role of hunting down and killing parachutists, and fifth columnists, as well as attacking and harassing German forces.

In the popular mind it was the twin terrors of Nazi paratrooper and Fifth Columnist traitor which were the Home Guard's nemesis, its natural enemy. Notwithstanding that the Home Guard actually spent most of its time preparing to defend 'nodal points' against tank attack, operating anti-aircraft artillery or locating unexploded bombs.

The clash led to morale problems and even more complaints to the press and the War Office from LDV members who were opposed, as they saw it, the government's leaving them defenceless and placing them in a noncombatant role. Complaints about the role of the LDV and continuing problems encountered by the War Office in its attempts to clothe and arm the LDV, led the government to respond to public pressure in August, redefining the role of the LDV to include delaying and obstructing German forces through any means possible. Also in August, the Home Office and MI5 instituted the 'Invasion List', a list of around 1,000 persons whose 'recent conduct or words indicated that they were likely to assist the enemy' and who would be apprehended by the police in the event of an invasion, hoping thereby to forestall the expectations of many LDV volunteers that they would then be empowered to act as 'Judge, Jury and Executioner' of potential collaborators and fifth columnists.

At the same time, Churchill, who had assumed the position of Prime Minister in May 1940, became involved in the matter after being alerted to the problems, obtaining a summary of the current LDV position from the War Office on 22 June 1940. After reviewing the summary, Churchill wrote to Eden stating that in his opinion, one of the main causes of disciplinary and morale problems stemmed from the uninspiring title of the LDV and suggesting that it be renamed as the 'Home Guard'. Despite resistance from Eden and other government officials, who noted that one million "LDV" armbands had already been printed and the cost of printing another million 'Home Guard' armbands would be excessive, Churchill would not be dissuaded. On 22 July, the LDV was officially renamed the Home Guard. Churchill ruled decisively on the issue of whether civilian volunteers should actively resist German forces, even at the expense of setting themselves outside the protection of the Geneva Conventions. The 'Rules of War', he pointed out, had been drawn up with the express intention of avoiding defeated combatants fighting on to the last. However, in the fight against Nazism, any outcome, including the complete destruction of a town and the massacre of its population, would be preferable to its acquiescing to Nazi rule.

=== Formal combatant status ===
The Home Guard in 1940 were an armed uniformed civilian militia, entirely distinct from the regular army and the Territorial Army, and the other armed forces. Volunteers originally had no recognised military rank, were not subject to military discipline and could withdraw (or be withdrawn by their employers) at any time. In 1941, nominal ranks were introduced for Home Guard 'officers', and in 1942, limited conscription was implemented intended for circumstances where Home Guard forces were taking over functions from regular forces (chiefly coastal artillery and anti-aircraft batteries), and non-officer volunteers became 'privates'. Volunteers remained legally civilians and failure to attend when ordered to do so was punishable by civilian authorities. Nevertheless, the British Government consistently maintained that as Home Guard service was strictly to be undertaken only in approved uniform, uniformed volunteers would be lawful combatants within the Geneva Conventions and so would be "prisoners of war" if captured. That was an argument with a long history since armed civilian irregulars (uniformed and non-uniformed) had been widely employed by smaller combatant nations in the First World War, but former British governments had consistently refused to recognise captured irregular combatants in uniform as prisoners of war. Indeed, most of the Irish Republican volunteers executed by the British administration following the 1916 Easter Rising had been fighting or at least surrendered in full Irish Volunteer or Irish Citizen Army uniforms. However, that was an uprising or rebellion of subjects of the Crown and was not entirely comparable to combatants in a war between sovereign states.

German and Austrian military traditions were, if anything, more absolute in rejecting any recognition of civilian militia combatants as prisoners of war since the German response to the nonuniformed francs-tireurs who had attacked German forces during the Franco-Prussian War of 1870. It had long been standard German military practice that civilians who attacked German troops in areas that opposing regular forces had surrendered, withdrawn or chosen not to defend should be considered properly liable to be shot out of hand. Indeed, German military doctrine had always maintained that their military forces were further entitled in such circumstances to take reprisals against unarmed local civilians - taking and executing hostages, and leveling villages: "fight chivalrously against an honest foe; armed irregulars deserve no quarter". The actions of regular German forces during the Second World War consistently conformed to those principles: captured partisans in the Soviet Union and the Balkans, whether they were fighting in uniform or not, were killed on the spot. German radio broadcasts described the British Home Guard as 'gangs of murderers' and left no doubt that they would not be regarded as lawful combatants.

== Organisation, deployment and tactics ==
By the end of 1940, the Home Guard was established into 1,200 battalions, 5,000 companies and 25,000 platoons. For its primary defensive role, each section was trained and equipped to operate as a single, largely independent 'battle platoon', with an operational establishment of between 25 and 30 men at any one time although, as volunteers would also have full-time jobs, the numbers of volunteers in each section would be around twice that establishment. In the event of an invasion, the Home Guard battle platoons in a town would be under the overall control of an Army military commander and maintain contact with that commander with a designated 'runner' (no Home Guard units were issued with wireless sets until 1942), who would usually be a motorbike owner. Otherwise, the battle platoon was static and would defend a defined local area and report on enemy activity in that area, but it was neither equipped nor expected to join up with the mobile forces of the regular army. Each Home Guard unit would establish and prepare a local strongpoint, from which 'civilians' (non-Home Guard) would be cleared if possible, and aim to defend that strongpoint for as long as possible. It might be forced to retreat towards a neighbouring strongpoint but would not surrender so long as ammunition held out. Most towns of any size would have a number of such Home Guard units, each defending its own strongpoint and providing 'defence in depth', which should ideally be sited to offer supporting fire to cover one another and to control road access through the town from all directions.

Each battle platoon had a headquarters section; commander, second in command, runner, and at least one marksman 'sniper' with an M1917 Enfield rifle. The fighting force of the platoon consisted of three squads of around 8 men, each squad having a three-man automatic weapons group (usually with one either of a BAR or Lewis gun) and a rifle/bomb group armed with M1917 rifles, grenades and sticky-bombs, and a Thompson or Sten sub-machine gun if possible. Men without rifles should all have shotguns, if available. The basic tactical principle was 'aggressive defence'; fire would be held until the enemy were within the defensive perimeter of the town in force and they would then be attacked with concentrated firepower of bombs, grenades, shotguns and automatic weapons (as much as possible from above and from the rear), with the object of forcing them into cover close by. Retreating enemy forces would be counterattacked (again preferably from the rear), the automatic weapons group of each squad providing covering fire while the bombing group attacked with grenades, submachine guns and shotguns. As many Germans as possible should be killed, and no prisoners would be taken.

Battle tactics were derived substantially from the experience of Spanish Republican forces although they also drew on the experience of the British Army (and the IRA) in Ireland. The emphasis was on drawing the Germans into fighting in central urban areas at short ranges, where stone buildings would provide cover; lines of communication between units would be short; the Home Guard's powerful arsenal of shotguns, bombs and grenades would be most effective; and German tanks and vehicles would be constrained by narrow, winding streets.

=== Secret roles of the Home Guard ===
The Home Guard had a number of secret roles. That included sabotage units who would disable factories and petrol installations following the invasion. Members with outdoor survival skills and experience (especially as gamekeepers or poachers) could be recruited into the Auxiliary Units, an extremely secretive force of more highly trained guerrilla units with the task of hiding behind enemy lines after an invasion, emerging to attack and destroy supply dumps, disabling tanks and trucks, assassinating collaborators, and killing sentries and senior German officers with sniper rifles. They would operate from pre-prepared secret underground bases, excavated at night with no official records, in woods, in caves, or otherwise concealed.

These concealed bases, upwards of 600 in number, were able to support units ranging in size from squads to companies. In the event of an invasion, all Auxiliary Units would disappear into their operational bases and would not maintain contact with local Home Guard commanders, who should indeed be wholly unaware of their existence. Hence, although the Auxiliaries were Home Guard volunteers and wore Home Guard uniforms, they would not participate in the conventional phase of their town's defence but would be activated once the local Home Guard defence had ended to inflict maximum mayhem and disruption over a further necessarily brief but violent period.

=== Active military combat ===
It is a common fallacy that the Home Guard never fired a shot in anger during the whole of the Second World War. In fact, individual Home Guardsmen helped man anti-aircraft guns as early as the Battle of Britain during the summer of 1940. By 1943, the Home Guard operated its own dedicated batteries of anti-aircraft guns, rockets, coastal defence artillery and engaging German planes with their machine guns. They are credited with shooting down numerous Luftwaffe aircraft and the V-1 flying bombs that followed them in the summer of 1944. The Home Guard's first official kill was shot down on Tyneside in 1943. The Home Guard in Northern Ireland also took part in gun battles with the IRA.

A major new function emerged for the Home Guard after the German bombing campaign, the Blitz, in 1940 and 1941; resulting in large numbers of unexploded bombs in urban areas. Home Guard units took on the task of locating unexploded bombs after raids and, if such bombs were found (often after several months or years), would commonly assist in sealing off the danger area and evacuating civilians. Most Home Guard wartime fatalities occurred in the course of that task. Aside from deaths in accidents, the Home Guard lost a total of 1,206 members on duty to unexploded bombs, air and rocket attacks during the war.

== Equipment and training ==
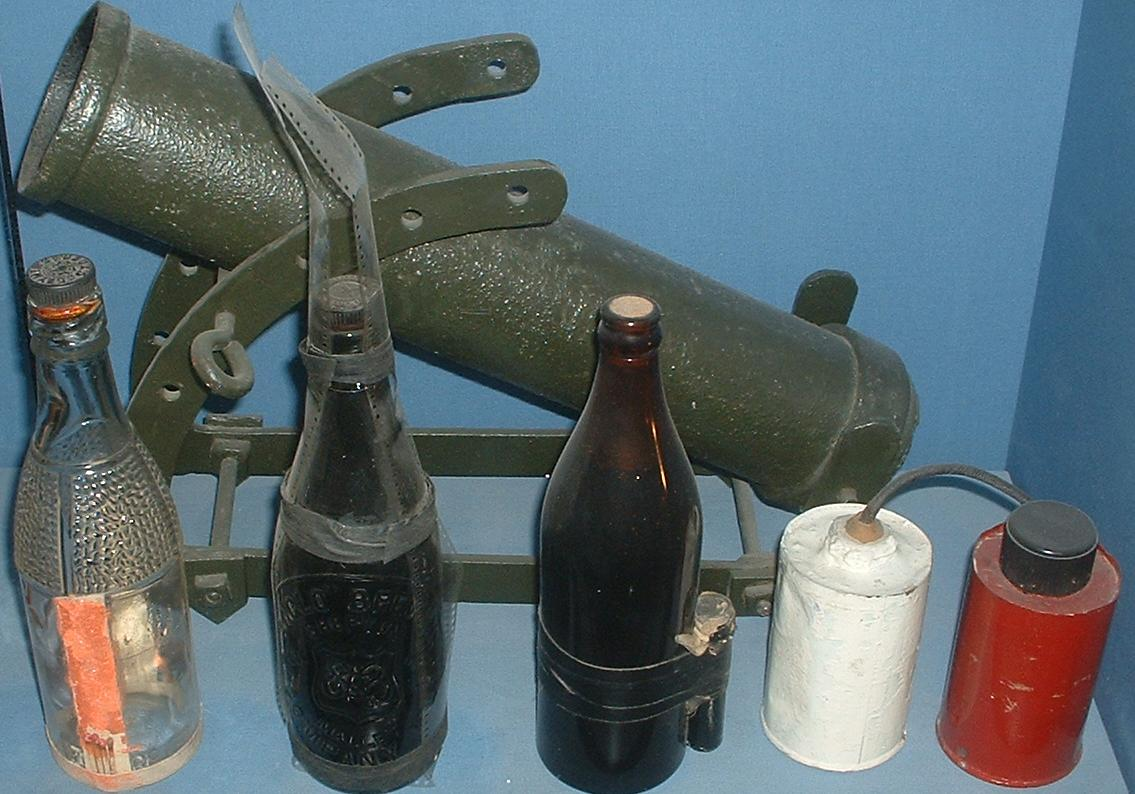
British Home Guard improvised weapons.

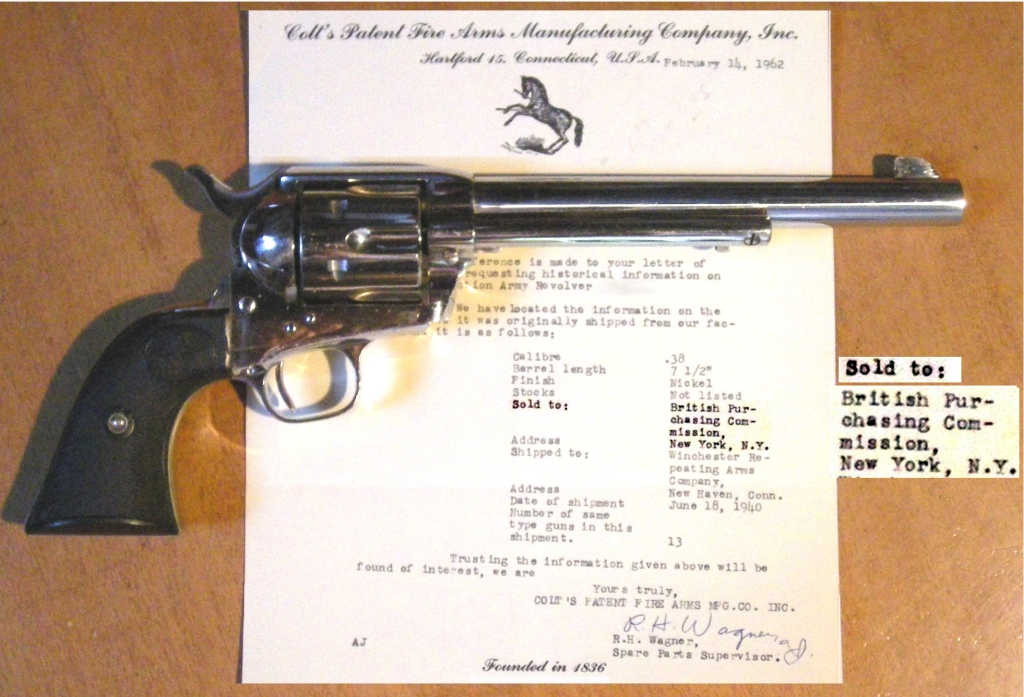
Colt Single Action Army "Battle of Britain".

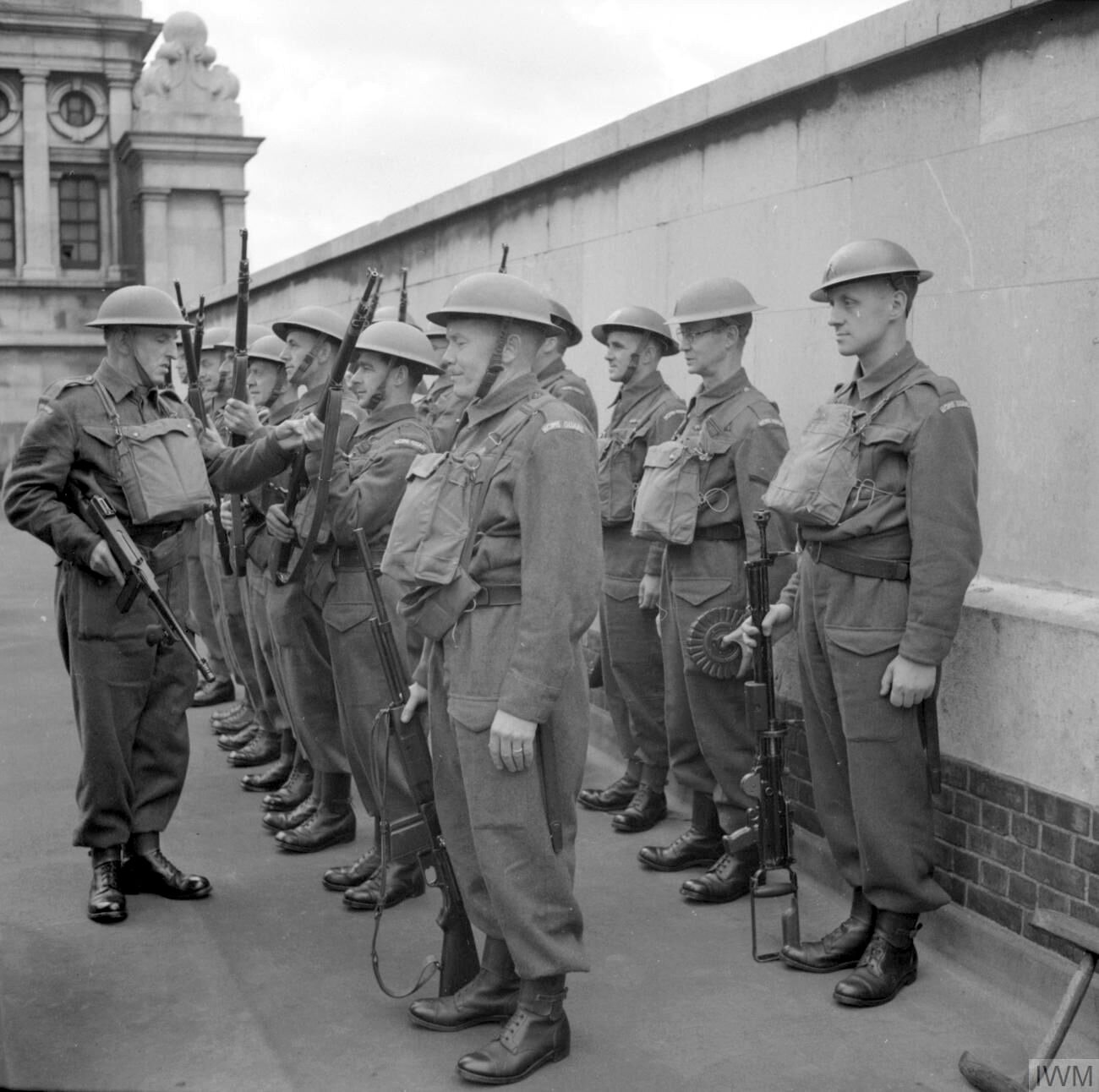
A Home Guard platoon in 1941. All are equipped with US supplied weapons: the volunteer at the end of the front rank with a Browning Automatic Rifle; the volunteer at the end of the rear rank with a Mark III* Lewis machine gun; accompanied by one volunteer carrying a 47-round ammunition magazine. Other volunteers visible have M1917 Enfield rifles, and the sergeant has a Thompson sub-machine gun

For the first few weeks the LDV were poorly armed since the regular forces had priority for weapons and equipment. Since the government could not admit the severe shortage of basic armaments for the regular troops in 1940, the public remained deeply frustrated at the failure to issue rifles to the LDV. Rifles were a particular problem, as domestic production of new Lee-Enfield rifles had ceased after the First World War; and in the summer of 1940 there were no more than 1.5 million serviceable frontline military rifles available in total. Contracts had been placed in the UK, Canada and the United States to build new factories for an updated Lee-Enfield model (designated Rifle No. 4), but in 1940 they were still a long way from volume production. The LDV's original role had been envisaged by the army as largely observing and reporting enemy movements, but it swiftly changed to a more aggressive role. Nevertheless, it would have been expected to fight well-trained and equipped troops despite having only negligible training and only weapons such as home-made bombs and shotguns (a solid ammunition for shotguns was developed for that purpose), personal sidearms and firearms that belonged in museums. Patrols were carried out on foot, by bicycle, even on horseback and often without uniforms, although all volunteers wore an armband printed with the letters "LDV". There were also river patrols using the private craft of members.

Many officers from the First World War armed themselves with Webley Mk VI .455 revolvers (officers had been expected to purchase their sidearms privately and retained them in civilian life). There were also numerous private attempts to produce armoured vehicles by adding steel plates to cars or lorries, often armed with machine guns. These improvised vehicles included the Armadillo armoured truck, the Bison mobile pillbox and the Bedford OXA armoured car (some of these makeshift vehicles were also operated by Royal Air Force units for aerodrome defense).

Lord Beaverbrook, the Minister of Aircraft Production, had sponsored the emergency creation of the "Car Armoured Light Standard" (a commercial car body with a simple armoured hull and light machine gun), known as the Beaverette, for the British armed forces but, to the intense annoyance of the British Army command, he insisted on reserving considerable numbers for Home Guard units guarding key air components factories. LDV units broke into museums, appropriated whatever weapons could be found and equipped themselves with private weapons such as shotguns. Many veterans who had served in the First World War had retained German sidearms as trophies, but ammunition was scarce. Members of the public deposited their sporting rifles at their local police stations, to be used (on loan) by the LDV, and local police forces themselves donated their stocks of military rifles, again on loan, but those expedients provided only around 8,000 rifles (although that number did not include volunteers' use of their own firearms).

Ex-communist and Spanish Civil War veteran Tom Wintringham, a journalist and key advocate of the LDV and later the Home Guard, opened a private training camp for the LDV at Osterley Park, outside London, in early July 1940. Wintringham's training methods were mainly based on his experience in the International Brigades in Spain. Those who had fought alongside him in Spain trained volunteers in anti-tank warfare and demolitions. Bert "Yank" Levy was one of the chief trainers, and his lectures became the source for a book on guerrilla warfare.

Supplies of small arms to the Home Guard improved radically after July 1940, when the active support of US President Franklin Roosevelt allowed the British government to purchase 500,000 M1917 Enfield Rifles and 25,000 M1918 Browning Automatic Rifles from the reserve stock of the US armed forces, but the very limited initial issue of standard Lee-Enfield rifles was withdrawn as the American arms became available, as were some 25,000 Pattern 14 .303 rifles (the British calibre version of the M1917 Enfield) and 60,000 Canadian Ross rifles. The M1918 Browning Automatic Rifles lacked the bipod stand and carrying handle that the US army had applied in an attempt to convert the weapon into a light machine gun but, when used primarily as a semiautomatic rifle fired from the shoulder (as was advised in Home Guard training manuals), one or two such weapons in a battle platoon could provide formidable additional firepower. In the hands of a trained soldier, each BAR could maintain a firing rate of up to 40 single shots per minute. Furthermore, the British government had placed large commercial orders for Thompson submachine guns, which were issued first to the Home Guard from 1941 onwards (especially to the secret Auxiliary Units). The British Expeditionary Force had lost almost its entire stock of Bren light machine guns in the Dunkirk evacuation and the regular army initially fell back on prewar and American Lewis guns as a stopgap; but by the end of 1940, around 14,000 of these American Lewis guns (together with some 4,000 American M1917 Browning machine guns) had been released to the Home Guard. From the perspective of the War Office, this removed weapons using US ammunition from regular army use, and had the further advantage that the three volunteers in the machine gun team would not expect rifles. This model of Lewis gun had been designed to be swivel-mounted in aircraft; before issuing to the Home Guard the fitted spade-handle stock was extended into a crude shoulder stock, and a wooden fore-grip and rigid triangular bipod added.

Within a few months, the Home Guard had acquired proper uniforms and equipment as the immediate needs of the regular forces were satisfied. Special trains were laid on to rush the M1917 rifles and Browning Automatic Rifles to Home Guard units, and by the end of July, all had been distributed. Priority in mid-1940 was given to Home Guard units on the South Coast and Home Counties and those defending key air industry suppliers from air and paratroop attack, and had an invasion happened in September or October, those Home Guard units would have largely been well equipped and armed for a static defence role, the key remaining lack being an effective anti-tank grenade capable of being launched a reasonable distance. After September 1940, the army began to take charge of the Home Guard training in Osterley, and Wintringham and his associates were gradually sidelined. Wintringham resigned in April 1941. Ironically, despite his support of the Home Guard, Wintringham was never allowed to join the organisation himself because of a policy barring membership by communists and fascists.

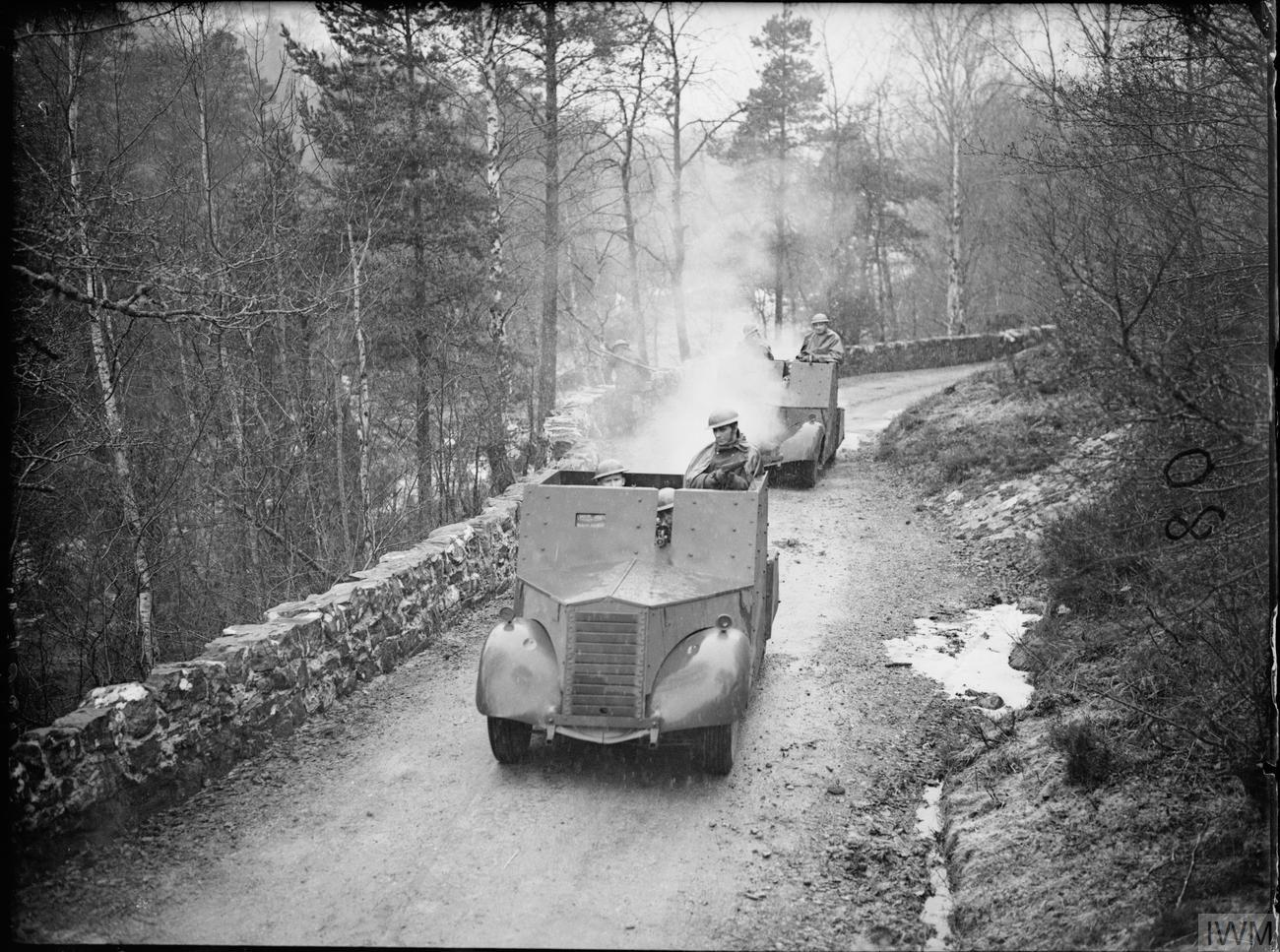
Standard Mk II Beaverette II light reconnaissance cars manned by members of the Home Guard in the Scottish Highlands, 14 February 1941.

Nevertheless, Home Guard members continued to express dissatisfaction with their armaments until 1943 since not all of the 1.5 million members could be provided with their own rifle or pistol. Although large numbers of M1917 Enfield rifles and Browning Automatic Rifles had been purchased for the use of the Home Guard, they had had to be laboriously cleaned of their heavy cosmoline packing grease by the Home Guard units themselves. All the American guns (M1917 Enfield Rifles, BAR, Lewis light machine guns and Browing M1917 machine guns) used the .30-06 Springfield cartridge, an 0.30 inch round, a type of ammunition totally different from and more powerful than the 0.303 round used by the service issue British Lee–Enfield rifle. A 2-inch-wide (51 mm) red band was painted around the fore end of the stock of the Enfield and BAR weapons as a warning since a 0.303 round would not load, but jam the rifle.

The Thompson guns used .45 ACP pistol ammunition, again not British Army standard, which was one major reason that the weapons had been turned down for use by the regular army in the first place. Indeed, it rapidly became accepted that any weapons firing US calibre .30 ammunition would go to the Home Guard. Each gun came with an adequate supply of ammunition: 50 rounds for each Enfield, 750 for each BAR and up to 1,000 rounds for the 'Tommy Guns'. However, Home Guard units were commonly not allowed to fire them in practice shooting as, until America entered the war, there were no reserve ammunition stocks, which reinforced the impression that they were not frontline weapons.

For regular shooting practice, the Home Guard mainly borrowed Territorial Army shooting ranges and guns, with limited issue of live .22 and .303 ammunition. From 1942, the Thompson guns (and their ammunition) were increasingly withdrawn to be issued to Commando forces but were replaced by large numbers of Sten submachine guns. For the first time, all Home Guard members could have their own issue firearm.

Home Guard training at Osterley Park had disseminated experience from Spanish Republican forces, in using improvised grenades and bombs in urban warfare against tanks. Two particular weapons were recommended for that purpose: the satchel bomb, a fused explosive charge in a canvas bag, and the Molotov cocktail, a glass bottle containing a mixture of petrol and a gelling agent.

The Home Guard inherited weapons that the regular army no longer required, such as the Blacker Bombard antitank weapon, and weapons they no longer desired, such as the Sticky bomb. The arsenal also included weapons that could be produced cheaply without consuming materials needed to produce armaments for the regular units such as the Northover Projector, a blackpowder-powered mortar; the No. 76 Special Incendiary Grenade, a glass bottle filled with highly-flammable material; and the Smith gun, a small artillery gun that could be towed by a car.

=== "Croft's Pikes" ===
By late 1940, the Home Guard had amassed 847,000 rifles, 47,000 shotguns and 49,000 machine guns of various kinds. With more than 1,682,000 volunteers, 739,000 men were thus unarmed. There was little improvement in June 1941, when Churchill wrote to the War Office saying that "every man must have a weapon of some sort, be it only a mace or a pike". The civil servants took Churchill at his word and ordered 250,000 pikes from the Ministry of Aircraft Production, each consisting of a long steel tube with an obsolete bayonet welded to the end. When the first reached the Home Guard, there was uproar, and it is thought that none were actually issued.

Captain Godfrey Nicholson, MP, spoke for the Home Guard when he said in the House of Commons that the provision of pikes, "if not meant as a joke, was an insult". Lord Croft, the Under-Secretary of State for War, could have blamed the fiasco on Churchill but defended the decision by saying that the pike was "a most effective and silent weapon". His name was attached to the affair thereafter. The armaments shortage was solved when the first mass-produced Sten submachine guns entered service early in 1942.

== Fifth Column ==
The German invasion of Poland in September 1939 had been supported by prepared irregular units raised from ethnic German populations in western Poland. Linking with the Brandenburg Regiment, troops equipped to fight in the uniforms of their opponents or disguised as civilians. As the German armed services refused to countenance regular troops engaging in such clearly irregular tactics, the Brandenburgers in Poland served under the command of the Abwehr, German military intelligence. Counterpart tactics were employed in the spring of 1940 in support of the German invasions of Norway, Belgium and the Netherlands, but German success in those invasions was more substantial because of the use of paratroopers to seize and hold key defence points behind the front line and to prevent the defending forces from concentrating against the main German ground forces. British public opinion conflated the two tactics and concluded that the rapidity of the German victories in Norway, Belgium and the Netherlands had to be caused by German paratroops linking with a prepared 'fifth column' in each country of Nazi sympathisers and ethnic Germans.

Now that Britain might potentially face invasion, the British press speculated that the German Gestapo had already prepared two lists of British civilians: "The Black Book" of known anti-fascists and prominent Jews who would be rounded up following an invasion and 'The Red Book' of 'Nazi sympathisers' who would support the German invaders as a fifth column. The police and security services found themselves deluged with a mass of denunciations and accusations against suspected fifth columnists. General Ironside, Commander in Chief, Home Forces, was convinced that substantial landowners in the British fifth column had already prepared secret landing strips in South East England for the use of German airborne forces. The Imperial General Staff, spurred on by Churchill, pressed for widespread internment of Nazi sympathisers.

The government's worst fears were briefly thought to have been confirmed on 20 May 1940. Tyler Kent, a cipher clerk in the US embassy spying for the Germans, was apprehended by MI5. Kent had in his possession a locked ledger of 235 names, which was the prewar membership records of the "Right Club", an anti-war and anti-Semitic association run by the Conservative MP Archibald Maule Ramsay. None of that was made public at the time, but there was widespread public demand that if the names in the 'Red Book' could be obtained by the Security Services, they should be supplied to local Home Guard units in the event of an invasion. Lord Swinton was ordered by Churchill to determine the true extent of the threat and to propose measures to deal with it. Swinton's immediate response was that internment of British nationals with pro-German sympathies should be greatly extended, and Oswald Mosley and other leaders of the British Union of Fascists were interned on 21 May 1940, with some 700 other suspects.

However, following the loss at sea on 2 July 1940 of the SS Arandora Star, carrying German and Italian internees to Canada, the impracticalities and potential injustices of internment became more apparent, and the public understanding of the fifth column threat changed from being directed towards enemy nationals to being towards upper and upper-middle class Englishmen. Within a few weeks, the Security Services admitted that it had been unable to confirm any actual instance of organised fifth column activity or even any actual confirmed fifth columnist. Churchill, "with an impressive display of amnesia", asserted in the House of Commons at the end of August 1940 that he had always considered the fifth column threat to be exaggerated, and many of those detained were silently released. From that time on, the primary official response to fears of fifth column activity was that the names of those for whom there was substantial grounds for suspicion would be added to the 'Invasion List' and that fifth column activity otherwise would be countered by the Home Guard.

There had been no active Fifth Column actually established by the Germans in Britain in 1940 although numbers of fascist sympathisers might have joined one had they been approached. Nevertheless, Home Guard volunteers continued to assume that a major part of their military role would be to apprehend potential fifth columnists and hunt down and kill any that might mobilise in support of an invasion and prevent their linking up with German paratroops.

== Paratrooper defence ==
The use of German paratroopers in Rotterdam, where Fallschirmjäger landed in a football stadium and then hijacked private transport to make their way to the city centre, demonstrated that nowhere was safe. It was widely reported that the paratroops in the Netherlands had been assisted and guided by ethnic German servants in reaching their targets and that was reported as fact by the British ambassador. From July 1940, to counter the threat of an airborne assault, the Home Guard manned observation posts, where soldiers spent every night continuously watching the skies and were initially armed with shotguns but rapidly re-equipped with M1917 rifles.

Official British intelligence reports in 1940 gave credence to the belief that German paratroops routinely engaged in 'dirty tricks' by appearing in the uniforms of opposing forces or masquerading as civilians. Stray parachutists separated from their units were claimed to have feigned surrender to overpower and kill their captors with concealed weapons. In the first (unofficial) published Home Guard training manuals such warnings were re-enforced, with the advice that "the pretenders should be promptly and suitably dealt with" although otherwise official Home Guard guidance would avoid putting 'shoot to kill' orders in writing.

Following the German airborne capture of Crete in May 1941, further advice was rapidly disseminated throughout the Home Guard on defence against paratroops in the light of what was now learned about Fallschirmjäger tactics. In particular, it was noted that in German parachute drops, the paratroops themselves were armed only with a pistol and knife and for a period would be highly vulnerable until they had located and unpacked their separate dropped equipment containers. To disperse British regular forces around the country to provide rapid response cover for potential drop areas would severely deplete the main Home Defence order of battle, but that role appeared tailor-made for local Home Guard units and so throughout 1940 and 1941, defence against paratroops dominated much Home Guard thinking and training. Even after the immediate threat of an invasion had passed, Home Guard units associated with key industrial plants were provided with extra equipment, and Beaverette armoured cars, specifically to defend against possible paratroop raids.

To spread word in the event of an invasion, the Home Guard set up a relatively simple code to warn their compatriots. For instance, the word "Cromwell" indicated that a paratrooper invasion was imminent, and "Oliver" meant that the invasion had commenced. Additionally, the Home Guard arranged to use church bells as a call-to-arms for the rest of the LDV, which led to a series of complex rules governing who had keys to bell towers, and the ringing of church bells was forbidden at all other times.

== Uniform ==
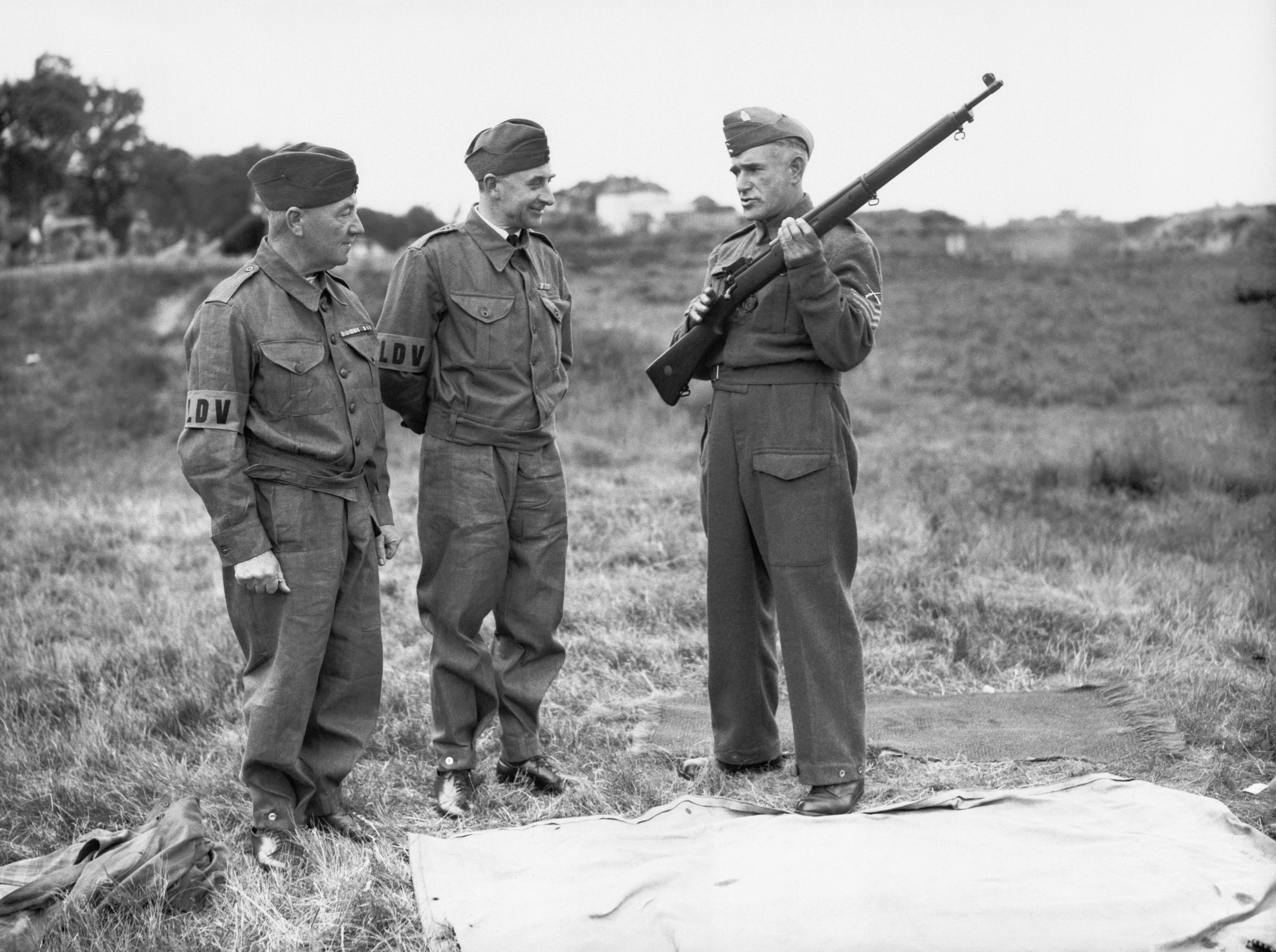
Two Local Defence Volunteers receiving instruction on either a Pattern 1914 or M1917 Enfield rifle. The two Volunteers are wearing the denim overalls over their ordinary clothes, one of them is wearing a collar and tie underneath. Note also the field service caps, the LDV armlets and civilian shoes worn without gaiters. The sergeant instructor is wearing standard battle dress.

On 22 May 1940, eight days after the formation of the LDV, the War Office announced that 250,000 field service caps were to be distributed as the first part of the uniform of the new force and that khaki brassards or "armlets" were being manufactured, each carrying the letters "LDV" in black. In the meantime, LDV units improvised their own brassards with whatever materials were available. Local Women's Voluntary Service branches were often asked to produce them, sometimes by using old puttees donated by veterans.

The British Army used loose-fitting work clothes called "Overalls, Denim" which were made of khaki-coloured cotton twill fabric and consisted of a short jacket or "blouse" and trousers. They were cut to the same style as and were designed to be worn over the 1938 pattern Battle Dress. It was announced that 90,000 sets of denim overalls would be released from military stores at once and that more would be issued as soon as they could be manufactured.

On 25 June, Anthony Eden announced in the House of Commons that LDV uniform was intended "to consist of one suit of overalls of design similar to that of battle dress, a field service cap, and an armlet bearing the letters 'L.D.V.'". On 30 July 1940, Eden further announced that the Home Guard (as the LDV had been renamed) would be issued with military boots as supplies became available.

The issue of uniforms proceeded slowly because of shortages and the need to re-equip and enlarge the army following the Fall of France. On 14 August, Eden announced that the supply of material to make the denim overalls was insufficient and that regular battle dress would be released to the Home Guard as an interim measure. By the end of 1940, the Cabinet had approved the expenditure of £1 million for the supply of battle dress to the whole force. On 20 August 1940, it was further announced that blankets were being issued and that the intention was to provide the Home Guard with greatcoats.

As winter approached, there were many complaints from Home Guardsmen who had to patrol or stand sentry without the benefit of a uniform overcoat. Therefore, a large cape made of heavy serge fabric was hastily designed and issued in the interim. There was no prospect of being able to provide sufficient sets of the 1937 pattern web equipment (including belt, ammunition pouches and a haversack) to the Home Guard and so a simplified equipment set made from leather and canvas was produced. Particularly unpopular were the awkward leather "anklets" which were issued in place of the webbing gaiters worn by the army. The lack of provision of steel helmets was keenly felt, especially by those Home Guardsmen required to be on guard duty during the Blitz when the risk of being hit by a shell splinter was high. That situation was only gradually rectified.

=== Northern Ireland ===
In Northern Ireland, the provincial government had placed the LDV under the control of the Royal Ulster Constabulary; they were known as the Ulster Defence Volunteers, and then the Ulster Home Guard. The police held large stocks of black cloth in reserve, for use by the Ulster Special Constabulary in the event of large-scale civil insurgency. The black cloth was quickly made up into uniforms in the style of the denim overalls by the many clothing factories in the province. The Ulster Home Guard kept their black uniforms until Battle Dress began to be issued in April 1941.

== Ranks ==
When the Home Guard was first formed, it had its own rank structure. As a unit of volunteers, it was thought that there should be a system of appointed ranks, with officers who did not hold a King's Commission.

It was not until November 1940 that it was decided to bring the Home Guard structure into line with the regular army. From February 1941, officers and men were known by regular army ranks except that "Private" was not used until the spring of 1942, when the rank of "Volunteer" was dropped in favour of "Private".

After November 1940, officers were granted a King's Commission but were regarded as junior in rank to a regular army officer of the equivalent rank and senior to army officers of a junior rank.

Home Guard pre-November 1940	Zone Commander	Group Commander	Battalion Commander	Company Commander	Platoon Commander			No equivalent			Squad Commander			Volunteer
Home Guard post-November 1940	Brigadier	Colonel	Lieutenant Colonel	Major	Captain	Lieutenant	Second Lieutenant	Warrant Officer Class I	Warrant Officer Class II	No equivalent	Sergeant	Corporal	Lance Corporal	Volunteer (Note: Private after 1942)
Rank insignia post-November 1940														
Regular Army equivalents	Brigadier	Colonel	Lieutenant colonel	Major	Captain	Lieutenant	Second Lieutenant	Warrant Officer Class I	Warrant Officer Class II	Staff/Colour Sergeant	Sergeant	Corporal	Lance Corporal	Private

== American participation ==
Churchill had recognised that the Home Guard offered a powerful opportunity to promote pro-British sentiments in the United States and hoped that by encouraging US interest and participation in the Home Guard, it might be possible to advance his aspirations to bring the United States into the war against Germany. Although there were also strong practical advantages in directing weapons sourced in the United States towards the Home Guard, rather than the regular army, the prompt issuing of very large numbers of modern American rifles and machine guns to the Home Guard still offered a golden opportunity for British propaganda, which was widely exploited.

The messages sought to be disseminated in the propaganda was that 'Britain can take it' and would never concede to Nazi domination and would be a steadfast ally and also that the Britain being defended was a repository of traditional civility and humanitarian values. One consequence was to establish a representation of the Home Guard through popular films, such as Mrs. Miniver and Went the Day Well?, as defending idealised rural English villages, but most Home Guard units were in fact in towns and cities, and most volunteers were industrial workers.

=== Committee for American Aid for the Defense of British Homes ===
In November 1940, a committee was formed to collect donations of pistols, rifles, revolvers, shotguns and binoculars from American civilians; to be provided to Home Guard units. Most useful were pistols, especially police issue revolvers, provided from the reserve stocks of US city police departments, many of which went to support Home Guard Auxiliary units.

=== 1st American Squadron of the Home Guard ===
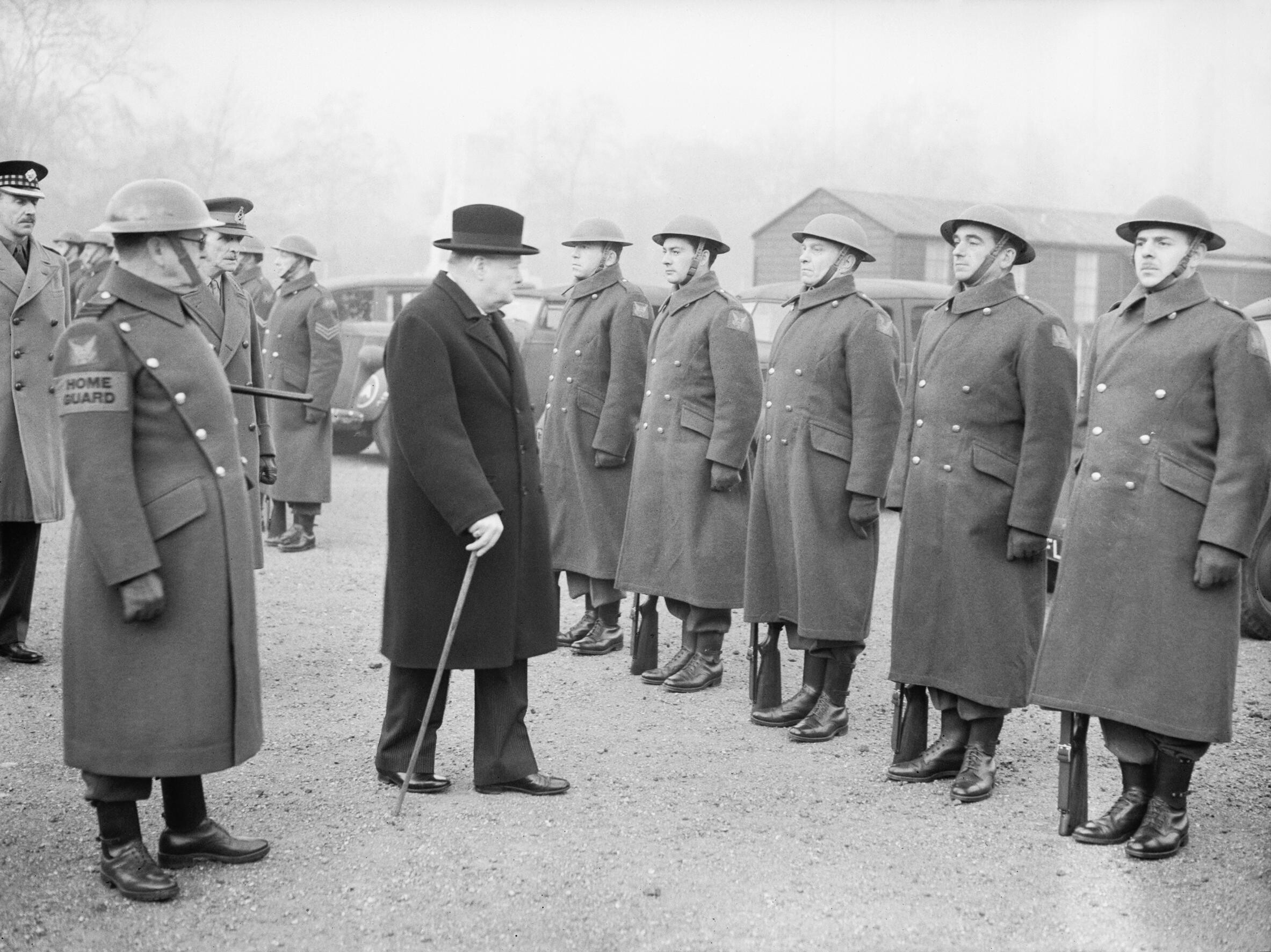
Winston Churchill inspects the 1st American Squadron of the Home Guard on Horse Guards Parade, London, 9 January 1941. They are fortunate to have already been issued with greatcoats, steel helmets, boots and leather anklets, which many of their colleagues were still awaiting.

On 17 May 1940, the United States Embassy advised the 4000 Americans living in Britain to return home "as soon as possible." A sterner message in June warned "that this may be the last opportunity for Americans to get home until after the war." Many Americans chose to remain, and on 1 June 1940, the 1st American Squadron of the Home Guard was formed in London. They had average strength of 60–70, and were commanded by General Wade H. Hayes.

The US ambassador in London, Joseph Kennedy, opposed the mustering of citizens from a neutral power. He feared that in the event of invasion, a civilian squadron would make all citizens of the then still-neutral America living in London liable to be shot by the invading Germans as francs-tireurs.

== Evolution of role and eventual disbandment ==
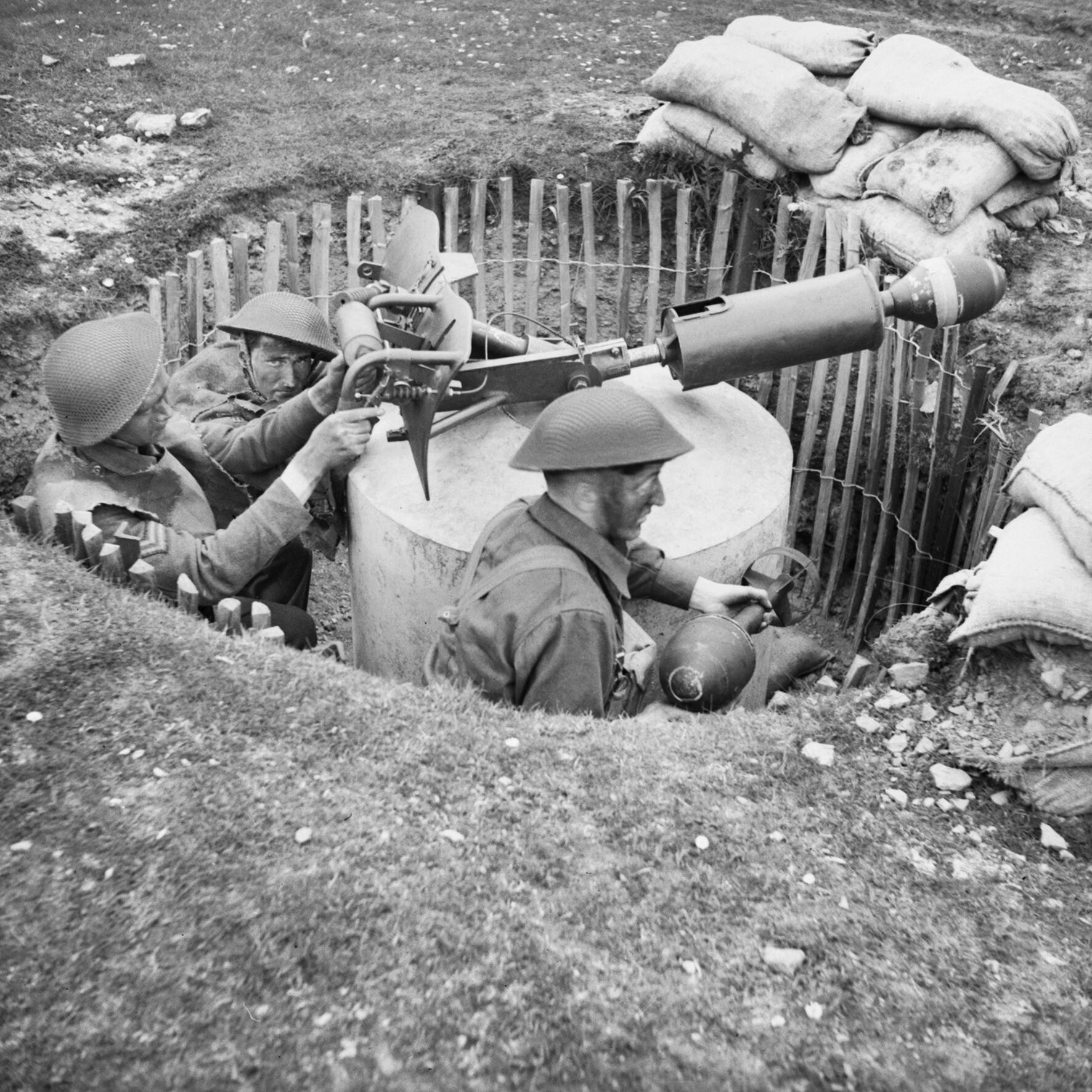
Home Guard soldiers training with a Blacker Bombard anti-tank mortar in May 1943. The mortar is mounted on a concrete pillar in a pre-prepared pit; of which around 18,000 were dug

The German invasion of the Soviet Union in 1941 clearly indicated that an immediate invasion of Britain was no longer to be expected but initially, the British military command did not expect Soviet resistance to last more than a few months and so the Home Guard needed to be retained in full readiness should the German threat be resumed in greater strength once the Soviets had been defeated. The Home Guard remained in existence manning guard posts and performing other duties to free up regular troops for duties overseas, especially taking over the operation of coastal artillery batteries and anti-aircraft batteries (especially rocket batteries for the protection of key industrial sites). In 1942, the National Service Act allowed for compulsory enrolment in the Home Guard of men aged 42 to 51 years where units were below strength. Meanwhile, the lowest rank within the Home Guard, 'volunteer', was renamed to 'private' to match the regular army usage.

=== Disbandment ===
It was only when the tide on the Eastern Front had definitively turned against Germany in 1943 that the military necessity for the Home Guard began to recede. Even so, both military planners and the public maintained an apprehension that the Germans might launch seaborne or airborne commando raids against targets in Southern England to disrupt the preparations for the Second Front or to assassinate Allied leaders. Following the successful landings in France and the drive towards Germany by the Allies, the Home Guard were formally stood down on 3 December 1944 and finally disbanded on 31 December 1945.

=== Recognition certificates ===
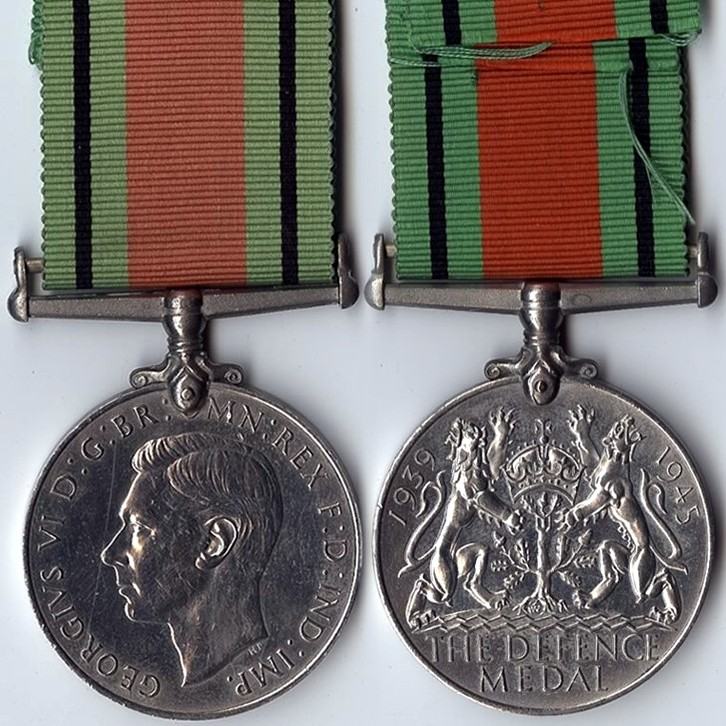
Defence Medal

Male members were rewarded with a certificate, bearing the words: "In the years when our Country was in mortal danger, (name) who served (dates) gave generously of his time and powers to make himself ready for her defence by force of arms and with his life if need be. George R.I." If he had served more than three years and requested it, a member would be awarded the Defence Medal. It was only in 1945 that women who had helped as auxiliaries were recognised with their own certificate.

== Social impact ==
Anthony Eden summarised the raising and equipping of the British Home Guard during a debate in the House of Commons in November 1940, when he was Secretary of State for War: "No one will claim for the Home Guard that it is a miracle of organisation... but many would claim that it is a miracle of improvisation, and in that way it does express the particular genius of our people. If it has succeeded, as I think it has, it has been due to the spirit of the land and of the men in the Home Guard".

General Sir John Burnett-Stuart, the commander of the 1st Aberdeen Battalion, commented that the Home Guard "was the outward and visible sign of the spirit of resistance". The chief constable of Glasgow suggested that criminal elements joined the Home Guard to break, enter and loot during the blackout.

== In popular culture ==
Noël Coward wrote a song in 1941, "Could You Please Oblige Us with a Bren Gun?", that pokes fun at the disorder and shortage of supplies and equipment that were common in the Home Guard, and indeed all of Britain, during the war.

Alison Uttley brought the Home Guard into her Little Grey Rabbit series of children's stories with Hare Joins The Home Guard in 1942.

In the 1942 Hollywood blockbuster film Mrs. Miniver, Clem Miniver (the father of the family, played by Walter Pidgeon) provides his own motor launch to form a Local Defence Volunteer 'River patrol', with whom he crosses the English Channel in support of the Dunkirk evacuation.

The British wartime propaganda film Went the Day Well? starring Thora Hird and made at Ealing Studios in 1942 focuses on how the Home Guard and the population of a village defeat the combined forces of German paratroops and local fifth columnists.

The Home Guard also played a significant part in Michael Powell and Emeric Pressburger's 1943 film The Life and Death of Colonel Blimp. In it, the lead character, a career soldier who had retired from the active list, joins the Home Guard and rises to a leadership position in it. He has planned a Home Guard training exercise for the following day; in which he himself would be the designated 'flag target' for capture by the opposite side; but they break the rules and seize him in advance in a Turkish bath. The film celebrates and justifies the Home Guard fundamental philosophy, that in the combat against Nazism all the previous 'rules of war' had been rendered obsolete.

The 1943 British film Get Cracking starred George Formby as a Home Guard lance corporal who is constantly losing and winning back his stripe. Formby's platoon is involved in rivalry with the Home Guard sections of the local villages Major Wallop and Minor Wallop. At the end of the film Formby is promoted to sergeant after inventing a secret weapon – a home-made tank.

The Home Guard also featured in the 1971 Disney film Bedknobs and Broomsticks.

In the last of his 'Old Sam' series of monologues, Stanley Holloway wrote of the protagonist of the series, Sam, attempting to join the army at the outbreak of war in 1939. In the series, Sam is a serviceman who fought at the Battle of Waterloo and in the First World War as an adult. In the monologue dealing with World War II Sam is sent to the Home Guard instead of the front line, much to his bemusement, and whilst there finds that his stories of glory are debunked by another character who turns out to be the Duke of Wellington with whom he fought at Battle of Waterloo.

The Home Guard appears in a scene in the film Hope and Glory (1987) when a unit shoots down a wayward barrage balloon and in the 2003 "War Games" episode of the British detective series Foyle's War, which is set in Hastings during World War II. In 2010, an episode of the Doctor Who spin-off The Sarah Jane Adventures featured Clyde Langer being transported back to the British coast during World War II, and featured the Home Guard.

=== Dad's Army ===
The Home Guard was immortalised in the British television comedy Dad's Army, which followed the formation and running of a platoon in the fictional south coast town of Walmington-on-Sea, and is widely regarded as having kept the efforts of the Home Guard in the public consciousness. It was written by Jimmy Perry and David Croft and was loosely based on Perry's own experiences in the Home Guard. Broadcast on BBC Television from 31 July 1968 (The Man and the Hour) to 13 November 1977 (Never Too Old), the sitcom ran for 9 series and 80 episodes in total (77 regular episodes and 3 Christmas specials), plus a radio version based on the television scripts, two feature films and a stage show. The series regularly gained audiences of 18 million viewers and is still repeated worldwide.

Dad's Army focuses primarily on a platoon of Home Guard volunteers ineligible for military service on grounds of age, and as such the series mainly featured older British actors, including Arthur Lowe, John Le Mesurier, Arnold Ridley and John Laurie (Ridley and Laurie had served in the Home Guard during the war). Among relative youngsters in the regular cast were Ian Lavender, Clive Dunn (who played the elderly Jones), Frank Williams, James Beck (who died suddenly during production of the programme's sixth series in 1973) and Bill Pertwee.

In 2004, Dad's Army was voted into fourth place in a BBC poll to find Britain's Best Sitcom. It had been placed 13th in a list of the 100 Greatest British Television Programmes drawn up by the British Film Institute in 2000 and voted for by industry professionals. The series has influenced popular culture in the United Kingdom, with the series' catchphrases and characters being well known. It highlighted a forgotten aspect of defence during the Second World War. The Radio Times magazine listed Captain Mainwaring's "You stupid boy!" among the 25 greatest put-downs on TV. A film featuring Bill Nighy, Sir Michael Gambon, Toby Jones and Sir Tom Courtenay was released in 2016.

== Home Guard honours ==
Awarded to the Home Guard	Ribbon	Medal	Notes
2		George Cross (GC)	Both posthumous; to Sec. Comm. George Inwood and Lieut. William Foster
24		Commander of the Order of the British Empire (CBE)	Military Division
129		Officer of the Order of the British Empire (OBE)	Military Division
396		Member of the Order of the British Empire (MBE)	Military Division
13		George Medal (GM)	
408		British Empire Medal (BEM)	Military Division
1		British Empire Medal (BEM)	Civil Division
1		Military Medal (MM)	
?		Defence Medal (United Kingdom)	
1		Mentioned in dispatches	
58		King's Commendation for Brave Conduct	2 were Posthumous

== Post-war revivals of the Home Guard ==
=== Home Guard: 1952–1957 ===
Home Guard
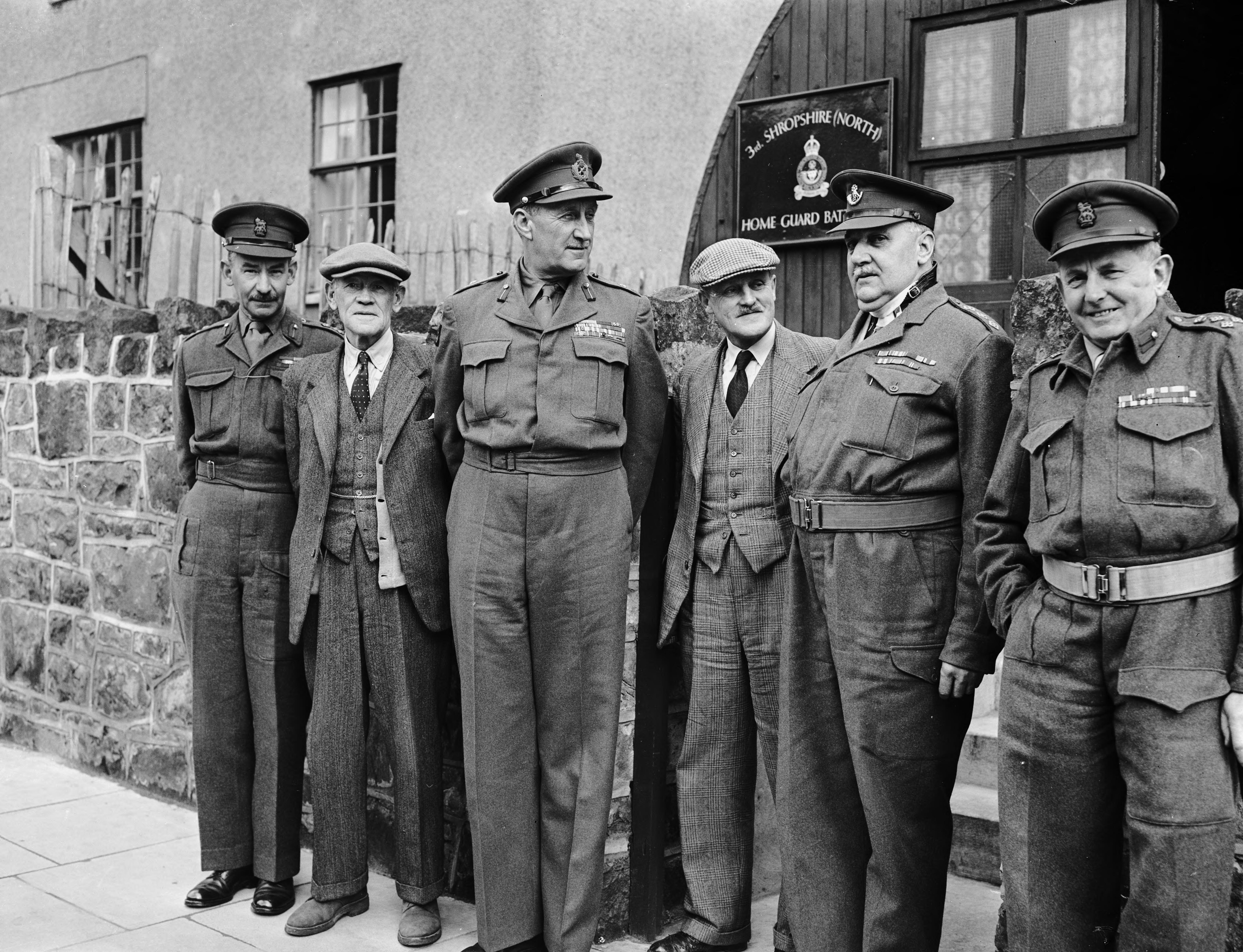
- Lt Gen Lashmer Whistler (General Officer Commanding-in-Chief of the Western Command) with local Home Guard commanders at Oswestry, 1954
- Active: 2 April 1952- 31 July 1957
- Disbanded: 1957
- Country: United Kingdom
- Branch: British Army
- Type: Volunteer militia
- Role: Defence from invasion

Not long after the Home Guard had been disbanded, suggestions began to be made that it be revived in the face of a new threat from the Soviet Union. The first official step was a paper by the Director of Military Operations (DMO) in November 1948, which was later incorporated into an executive committee of the Army Council (ECAC) report. Suggested roles included countering communist inspired insurrection as well as guarding vulnerable points and anti-invasion duties. In May 1949, a parliamentary Home Guard Working Party was established to consider the issues raised, which resulted in a further report being completed in August 1950.

Although preliminary planning started, such as the identification of suitable battalion commanders, nothing concrete was done because of financial constraints. It was not until Winston Churchill again become prime minister and Minister of Defence in the general election of October 1951 that preparations to revive the Home Guard began in earnest. Churchill predicted that there could be an assault on Britain by "twenty thousand or so" Soviet paratroopers (an assessment of the risk was not requested until March 1953, the outcome of which was that "the Chiefs of Staff believe that the Russians would not contemplate such a step – with or without atomic bombardment....").

The speech from the throne on 6 November 1951 included the intention to "take the necessary measures... to re-establish the Home Guard". While the required legislation was in passage through parliament, the Chiefs-of-Staff produced yet another report, outlining the final form that the new Home Guard should take. The force would consist of two categories of battalions; 162 would be "Category A" which would recruit 60 per cent of their projected wartime strength, while 397 "Category B" battalions would be established on an en cadre basis, a skeleton staff of trained officers and NCOs which could be expanded in a crisis. The majority of the Category A battalions would be in the south and east of England. The Home Guard Act 1951 received Royal Assent on 7 December. Enrolment started on 2 April 1952. The aim was to recruit 170,000 men in the first year, but by November 1952, only 23,288 had been enrolled, with a further 20,623 men who had joined a "Reserve Roll" (initially called the "Supernumerary Register") for enrolment in an emergency.

Uniform consisted of standard 1949 pattern battledress and midnight blue beret as worn by the rest of the army. Scottish battalions wore a Balmoral bonnet. A helmet and greatcoat were provided, along with 1937 pattern webbing. Small arms issued to the Home Guard were the Lee-Enfield No 4 Mk 1 rifle and the Mk II Sten sub-machine gun; the Bren gun was the section automatic weapon. Support weapons were the obsolescent PIAT antitank projector, the Vickers medium machine gun and the 2-inch mortar. A detachment of the Home Guard led the British Army section of the State Procession at the Coronation of Queen Elizabeth II in June 1953.

There was much criticism of the cost of the Home Guard, especially the full-time officers, since all battalions had a paid adjutant and quartermaster whose workload was quite limited, especially in Category B units. Accordingly, on 20 December 1955, it was announced that there would be a "reorganisation on a reserve basis". The essence was all battalions would be reduced to a cadre basis, and paid staff would have to effect the change before resigning their commissions or transferring to the Reserve Roll by 1 April 1956. A certificate of thanks was issued to those who had served in an active role. Even those reforms were not enough, and on 26 June 1957, John Hare, the Secretary of State for War, announced in parliament that the Home Guard would be disbanded on 31 July, making a saving of £100,000 in that year.

=== Home Service Force: 1982–1993 ===
At the height of the Cold War, the Home Service Force was established in 1982, starting with four "pilot companies". Recruitment began in earnest in 1984, but was limited to those who had previously served in the armed forces or reserves. Some 48 HSF units were formed, each hosted by an existing Territorial Army battalion. After the end of the Cold War, disbandment of the force commenced in 1992 as a part of the "peace dividend".

=== Strategic Defence Review (2025) ===
Reports issued in advance of the publication of the Strategic Defence Review in June 2025 suggested that a new voluntary defence organisation modelled on the Home Guard of World War II might be included within its recommendations. The Policy Paper for the Strategic Defence Review does not make direct reference to the "Home Guard" but does state that a "Cabinet Office-led Home Defence Programme will provide an additional layer of defence, security, and resilience planning, focused on alignment between military and civilian effort in a period of international hostilities affecting the UK".

== Famous Home Guards ==
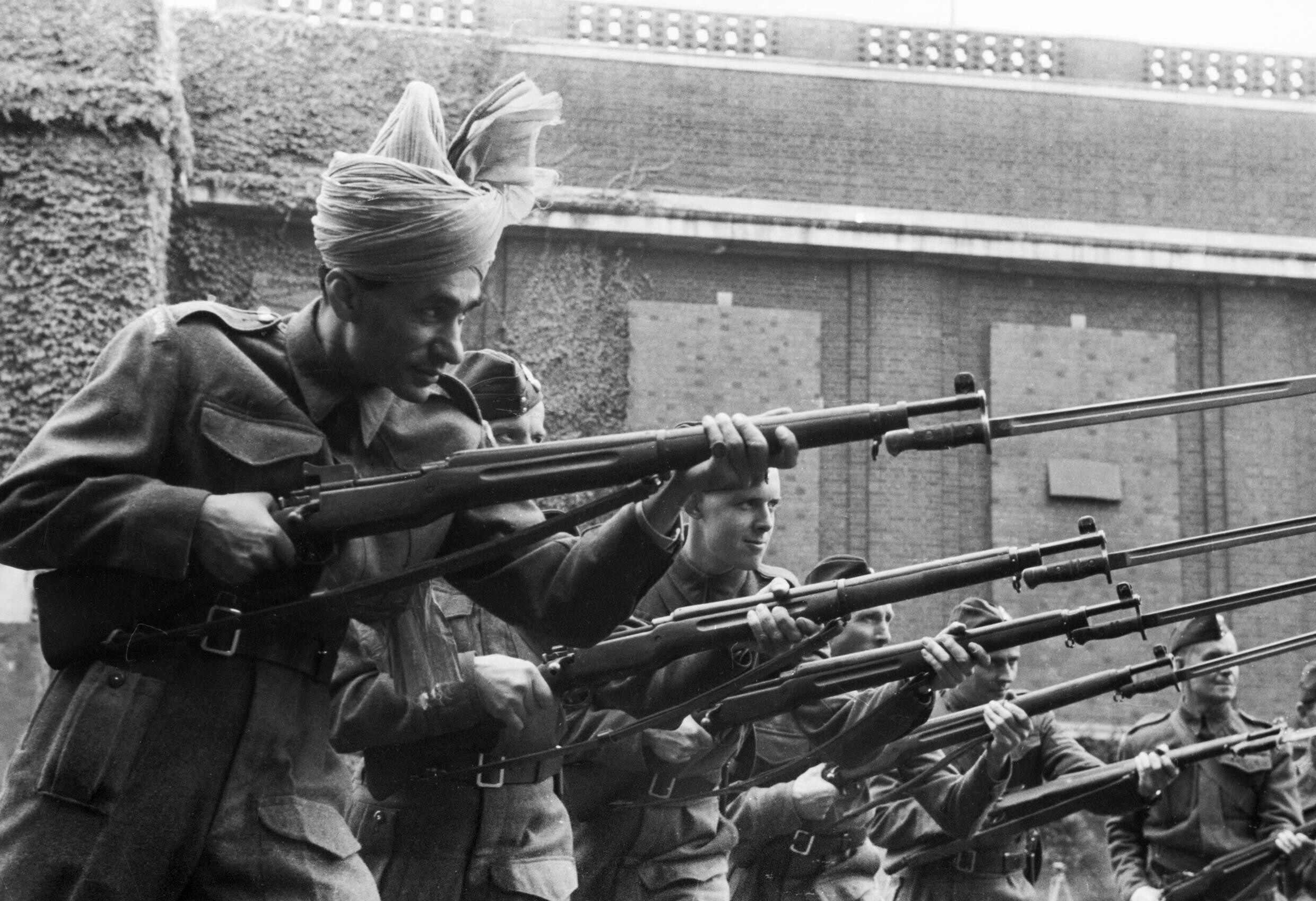
Zulfiqar Ali Bukhari training with the BBC Home Guard at Bedford College in 1941.

- Tony Benn, Labour politician (Bromyard and Oxted Home Guard), pre-enlistment in RAF
- John Brophy, Anglo-Irish soldier, journalist and author who wrote more than 40 books, mostly based on his experiences during World War I
- Zulfiqar Ali Bukhari, Urdu broadcaster and first director-general of Radio Pakistan (BBC Home Guard)
- Sir Henry Chilton, GCMG, Diplomat, Ambassador to Chile, Argentina, and Spain during the Spanish Civil War
- Cecil Day-Lewis, poet and later Poet Laureate of the United Kingdom (Musbury (Devon) Home Guard)
- George Formby, actor, singer-songwriter and comedian (Blackpool Home Guard, Corporal Despatch Rider)
- John Laurie, actor notably in Dad's Army (Paddington Home Guard)
- H. V. Morton, journalist and travel writer (Binsted platoon commander)
- C. S. Lewis, writer (Oxford Home Guard)
- A. A. Milne, children's author (captain in the Hartfield and Forest Row Home Guard)
- Patrick Moore, astronomer and broadcaster (East Grinstead Home Guard), prior to service in RAF
- Patrick Munro, Conservative politician and former Scotland rugby union football international (Palace of Westminster Home Guard), died during training at Westminster – the only MP to die on duty in the Home Guard
- George Orwell, author and journalist (Sergeant, Greenwich Home Guard)
- Jimmy Perry, scriptwriter, (Barnes and Watford Home Guard)
- Felix Powell, songwriter (Peacehaven Home Guard – committed suicide on duty)
- Arnold Ridley, playwright and actor, notably in Dad's Army (Caterham Home Guard)
- Frank Whitcombe, England rugby union international (Sergeant, Wibsey (Yorkshire) Home Guard)

== See also ==
- Operation Sea Lion, Nazi Germany's planned invasion of Britain
- Auxiliary Units, a British "stay behind" undercover force of 1940
- Military history of the United Kingdom during World War II
- Volunteer Training Corps (World War I), the British voluntary home defence force of World War I
- The American Committee for the Defense of British Homes, donated weapons, which went to the Home Guard.

Commowealth

- Canadian Rangers, a group in Canada that functions like the Home Guard
- Veterans Guard of Canada, Canadian Home Guard (WWII; initially known as the Veterans Home Guard)
- Volunteer Defence Corps, Australian Home Guard (WWII)
- Home Guard (New Zealand), New Zealand Home Guard (WWII)

International:

- Armia Krajowa, the dominant Polish resistance movement in World War II German-occupied Poland
- Black Brigades, one of the Fascist paramilitary groups operating in the Italian Social Republic during the final years of World War II
- State defense forces, non-federal military forces in the United States of America that operate in various states, similar to the Home Guard
- Volkssturm, German national militia of the last months of World War II
- Volunteer Fighting Corps, armed civil defense units planned in 1945 in the Empire of Japan
