= United States Uniformed Services Oath of Office =

U.S. military officer's oath

All officers of the eight uniformed services of the United States swear or affirm an oath of office upon commissioning. It differs from that of the oath of enlistment that enlisted members recite when they enter the service. It is required by statute, the oath being prescribed by Section 3331, Title 5, United States Code. It is traditional for officers to recite the oath upon promotion but as long as the officer's service is continuous this is not required.

== Text of the oath ==
I, [name], do solemnly swear (or affirm) that I will support and defend the Constitution of the United States against all enemies, foreign and domestic; that I will bear true faith and allegiance to the same; that I take this obligation freely, without any mental reservation or purpose of evasion; and that I will well and faithfully discharge the duties of the office on which I am about to enter. So help me God.

The oath applies while in "the office on which I am about to enter."

Officers of the National Guard of the various states, however, take an additional oath:

I, [name], do solemnly swear (or affirm) that I will support and defend the Constitution of the United States and the Constitution of the State (Commonwealth, District, Territory) of ___ against all enemies, foreign and domestic; that I will bear true faith and allegiance to the same; that I take this obligation freely, without any mental reservations or purpose of evasion, and that I will well and faithfully discharge the duties of the Office of [grade] in the Army/Air National Guard of the State (Commonwealth, District, Territory) of ___ on which I am about to enter, so help me God.

Commissioned officers O-1 (second lieutenant or ensign) through O-10 (general or admiral) and W-2 through W-5 (chief warrant officers) are commissioned under the authority of the President of the United States with the advice and consent of the United States Senate; warrant officers (W-1) receive a warrant under the authority of their respective service secretary (e.g., the Secretary of the Army or the Secretary of the Navy); National Guard officers are additionally committed to the authority of the governor of their state. They may be activated in the service of their state in time of local or state emergency in addition to federal activation. Reserve officers may only be activated by the President of the United States.

=== Air Force ===
Officers of the United States Air Force take the following oath:

I, (state your name), having been appointed a (rank) in the United States Air Force, do solemnly swear (or affirm) that I will support and defend the Constitution of the United States against all enemies, Foreign and domestic, that I bear true faith and allegiance to the same; that I take this obligation freely, without any mental reservation or purpose of evasion; and that I will well and faithfully discharge the duties of the office upon which I am about to enter. So help me God. (optional)

== History ==
The first oaths of office were given to those serving under the Continental Army, beginning in 1775. A candidate had to not only name the 13 states, but also swear to keep them "free, independent and sovereign states and declare no allegiance to George the third, king of Great Britain" as well as "defend the United States against King George, his heirs and successors, and his and their abettors, assistants and adherents".

It was first updated in September 1776, after the Declaration of Independence, to swear to be "true to the United States of America, and to serve them honestly and faithfully against all their enemies opposers whatsoever; and to observe and obey the orders of the Continental Congress and the orders of the Generals and officers set over me by them".

This was changed in 1789 to place allegiance to the Constitution of the United States at the beginning of the oath. It remained relatively unchanged until the 1860s. At this point, the reference to "them" was replaced with "it" to reflect the realities of the divided nation during the American Civil War, as well as the shifting attitude of viewing the United States as one entity rather than a collection of smaller ones. The conflict also resulted in adding the phrase "...all enemies, Foreign and domestic," in reference to Confederate sympathizers, as well as "without any mental reservation or purpose of evasion" in reference to members who were secretly supporting the South. In 1868, the officer oath was simplified to:

I, A.B., do solemnly swear (or affirm) that I will support and defend the Constitution of the United States against all enemies, foreign and domestic; that I will bear true faith and allegiance to the same; that I take this obligation freely, without any mental reservation or purpose of evasion; and that I will well and faithfully discharge the duties of the office on which I am about to enter. So help me God.

The enlisted oath underwent further revision and, as of 2002, read:

: I, ___, do solemnly swear (or affirm) that I will support and defend the Constitution of the United States against all enemies, foreign and domestic; that I will bear true faith and allegiance to the same; and that I will obey the orders of the president of the United States and the orders of the officers appointed over me, according to regulations and the Uniform Code of Military Justice. So help me God.

== See also ==
- United States Armed Forces oath of enlistment
