= Ceremonial oath of the Bundeswehr =

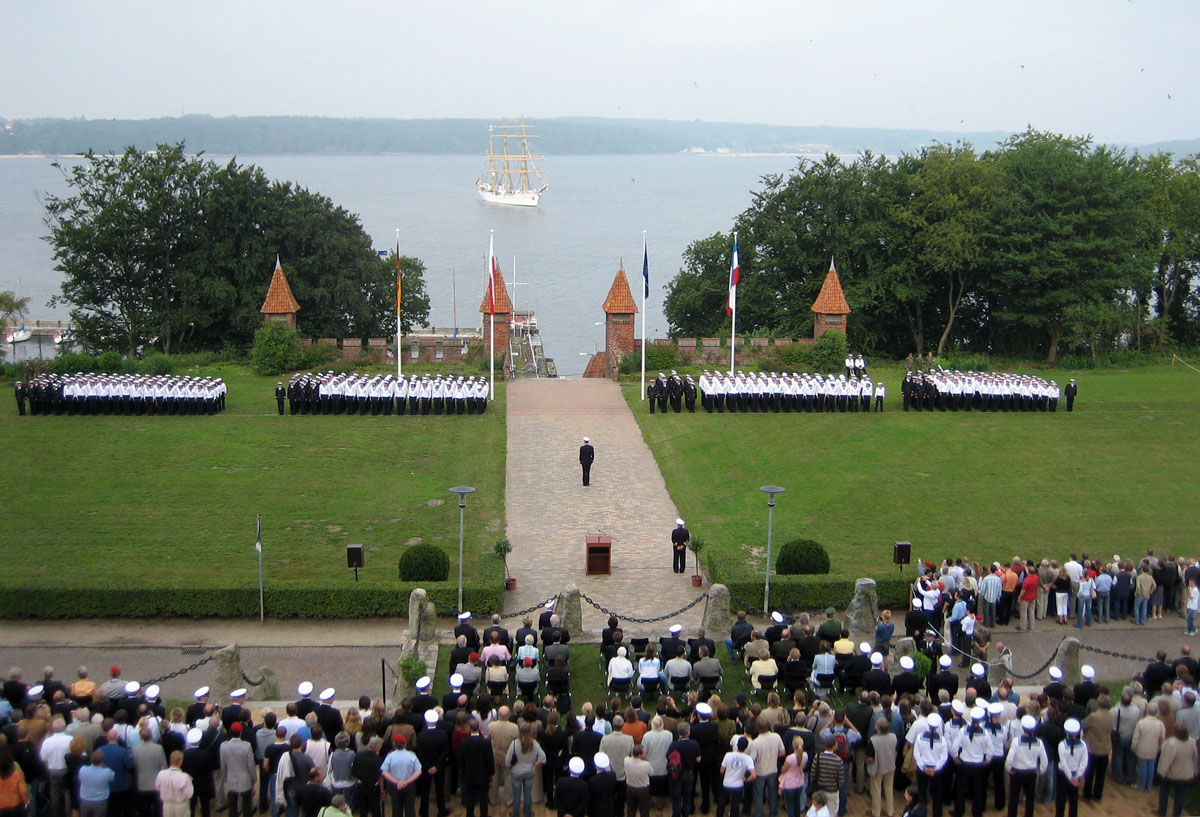
Cadets of the German Navy in formation for their ceremonial pledge in front of the German Naval Academy (Marineschule Mürwik)

There were originally two types of soldiers serving in the Bundeswehr (Federal Defence): regular units and conscripts. Consequently, there were also two types of oaths. Conscripts recited a pledge, since their service was compulsory and not unconditionally voluntary. Regular soldiers recited an oath in its true sense.

== Conscripted personnel ==
Soldiers speaking the pledge for conscripted personnel

Conscript's pledge:

"Ich gelobe, der Bundesrepublik Deutschland treu zu dienen, und das Recht und die Freiheit des deutschen Volkes tapfer zu verteidigen."

Translation:

"I pledge to loyally serve the Federal Republic of Germany and to courageously defend the right and the liberty of the German people."

Conscripts are allowed to decline taking the pledge, but this forfeits any chance of promotion during service. This refusal does not constitute conscientious objection to military service, since German conscripts are also allowed to render alternative social service in its place.

== Professional soldiers and Soldiers for a Time ==
Oath for other enlisted personnel, non-commissioned officers and officers serving for at least two years (Soldiers For a Time) or for lifetime (professional soldiers):

"Ich schwöre, der Bundesrepublik Deutschland treu zu dienen, und das Recht und die Freiheit des deutschen Volkes tapfer zu verteidigen, so wahr mir Gott helfe."

Translation:

"I swear to loyally serve the Federal Republic of Germany and to courageously defend the right and the liberty of the German people, so help me God."

The religious adjunct used with the oath was optional, the replacing of "ich gelobe" (I pledge) with "ich schwöre" (I swear) was not.
