= Molotov cocktail =

Type of improvised incendiary weapon

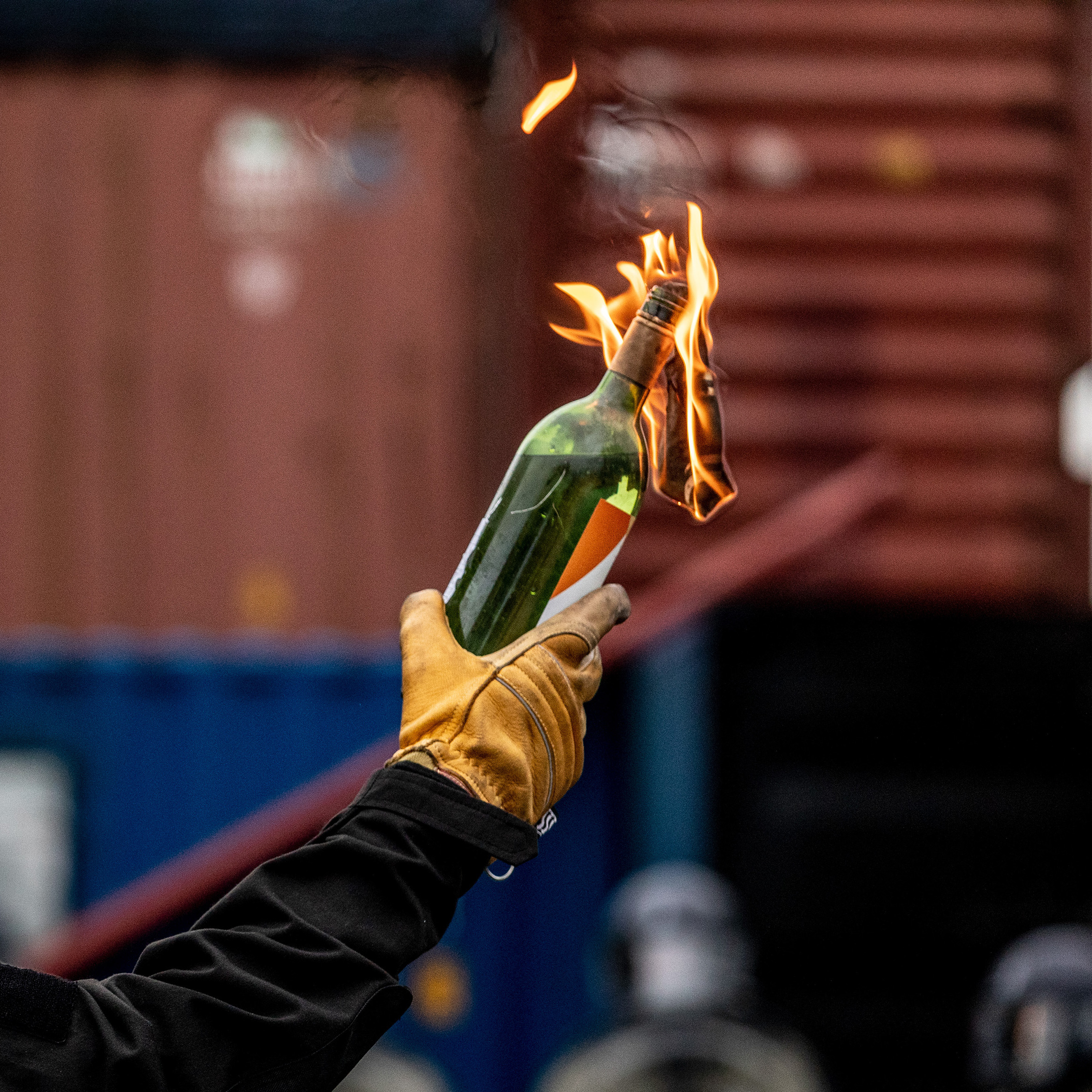
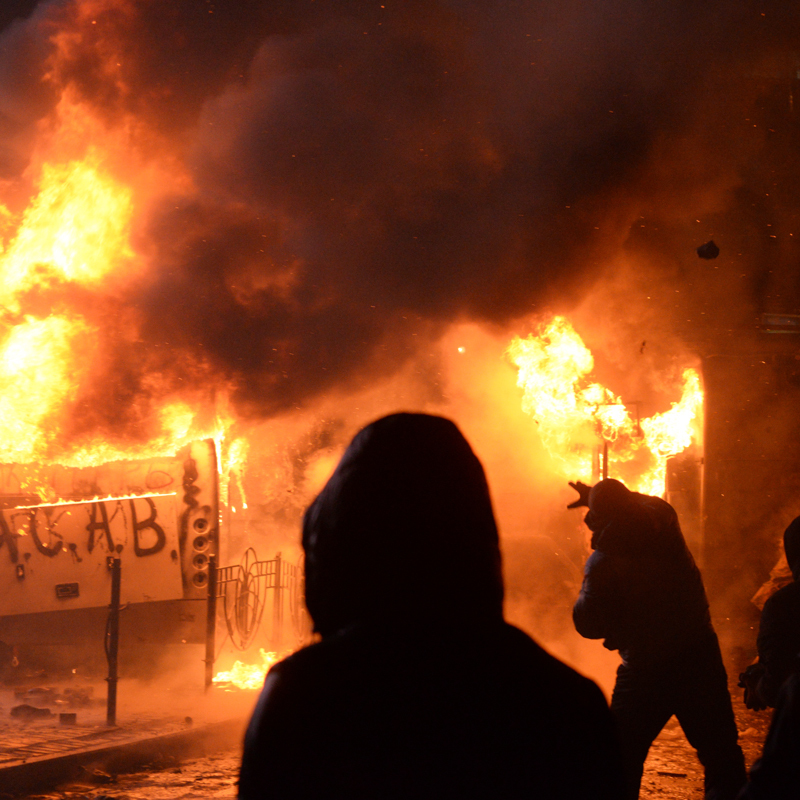
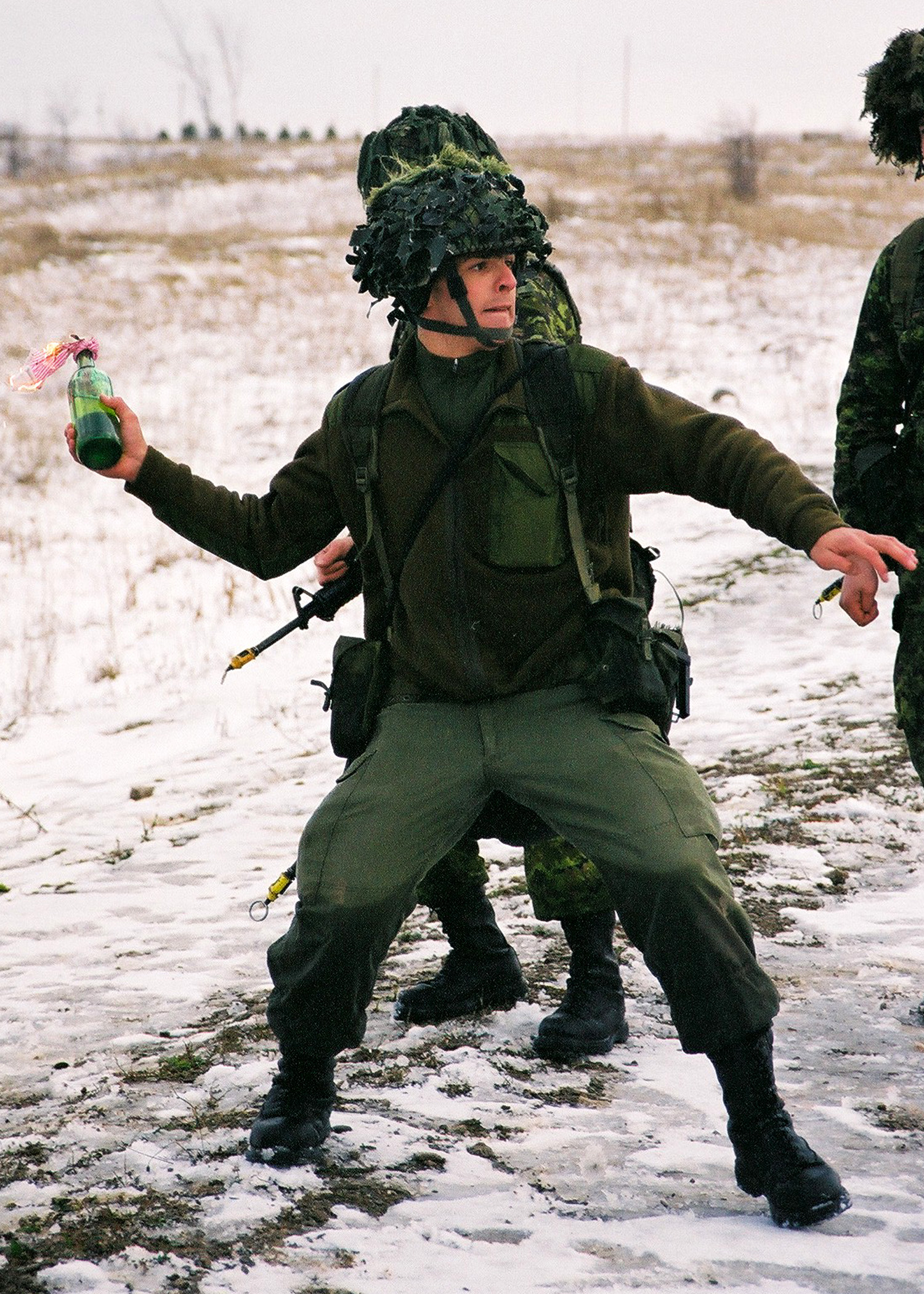
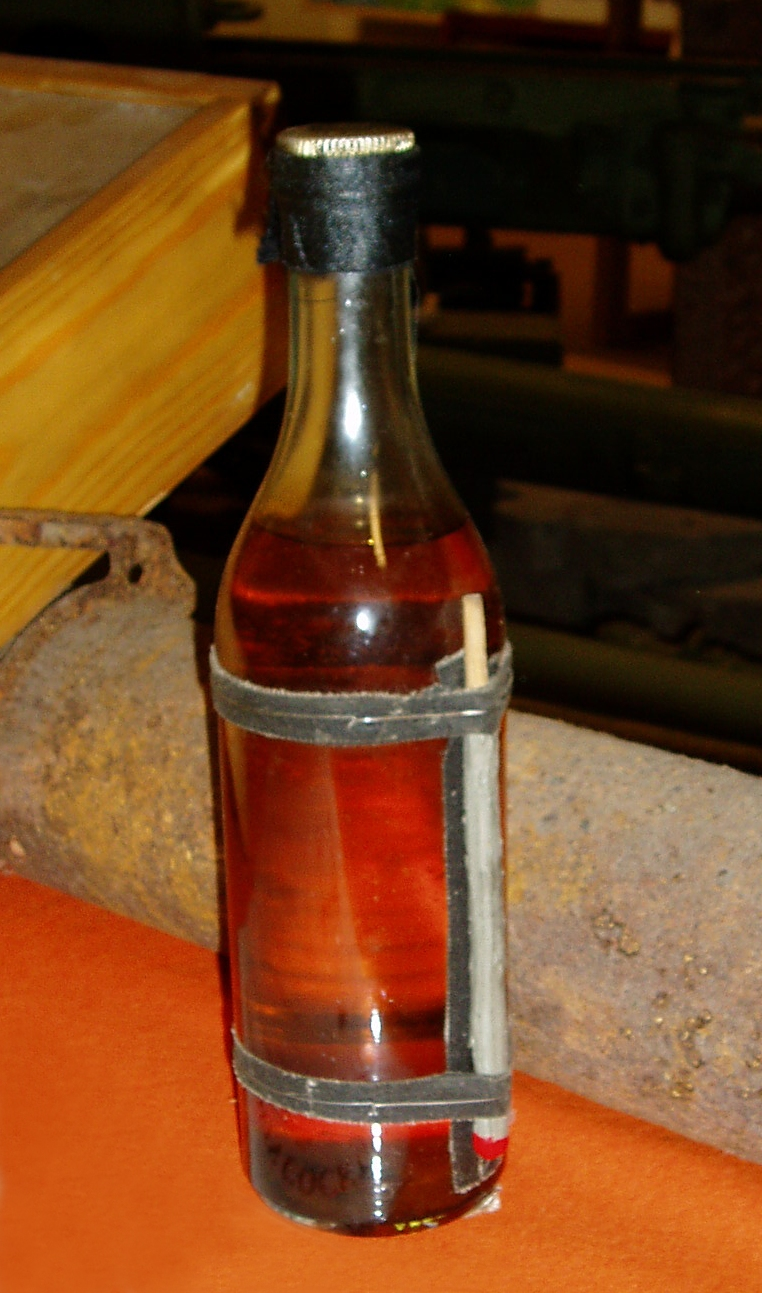
- Top left: Lit Molotov cocktail ready to be thrown in practice of the Dutch National Police Corps in 2021
- Top right: Use of Molotov cocktails during the Euromaidan riots in Ukraine in 2014
- Lower left: Canadian Armed Forces practice throwing Molotov cocktails in 2007
- Lower right: Original Finnish Molotov cocktail with storm match attached in Finland

A Molotov cocktail (among several other names – see § Etymology) is a hand-thrown incendiary weapon consisting of a frangible container filled with flammable substances and equipped with a fuse. It is typically a glass bottle filled with flammable liquids sealed with a cloth wick. In use, the fuse attached to the container is lit and the weapon is thrown, shattering on impact. This ignites the flammable substances contained in the bottle and spreads flames as the fuel burns.

Due to their relative ease of production, Molotov cocktails are typically improvised weapons. Their improvised usage spans criminals, gangsters, rioters, football hooligans, urban guerrillas, terrorists, irregular soldiers, freedom fighters, and even regular soldiers; usage in the latter case is often due to a shortage of equivalent military-issued munitions. Despite the weapon's improvised nature and uncertain quality, many modern militaries exercise the use of Molotov cocktails.

However, Molotov cocktails are not always improvised in the field. It is not uncommon for them to be mass-produced to a certain standard as part of preparation for combat. Some examples of this being done are the anti-invasion preparations of the British Home Guard during World War II and the Ukrainian volunteer units during the 2022 Russian invasion of Ukraine. During World War II, Molotov cocktails were even factory produced in several countries, such as Finland, Nazi Germany, the Soviet Union, Sweden, and the United States; some featuring specially designed frangible containers and fuses (such as the US Frangible Grenade M1 for example).

== Etymology ==
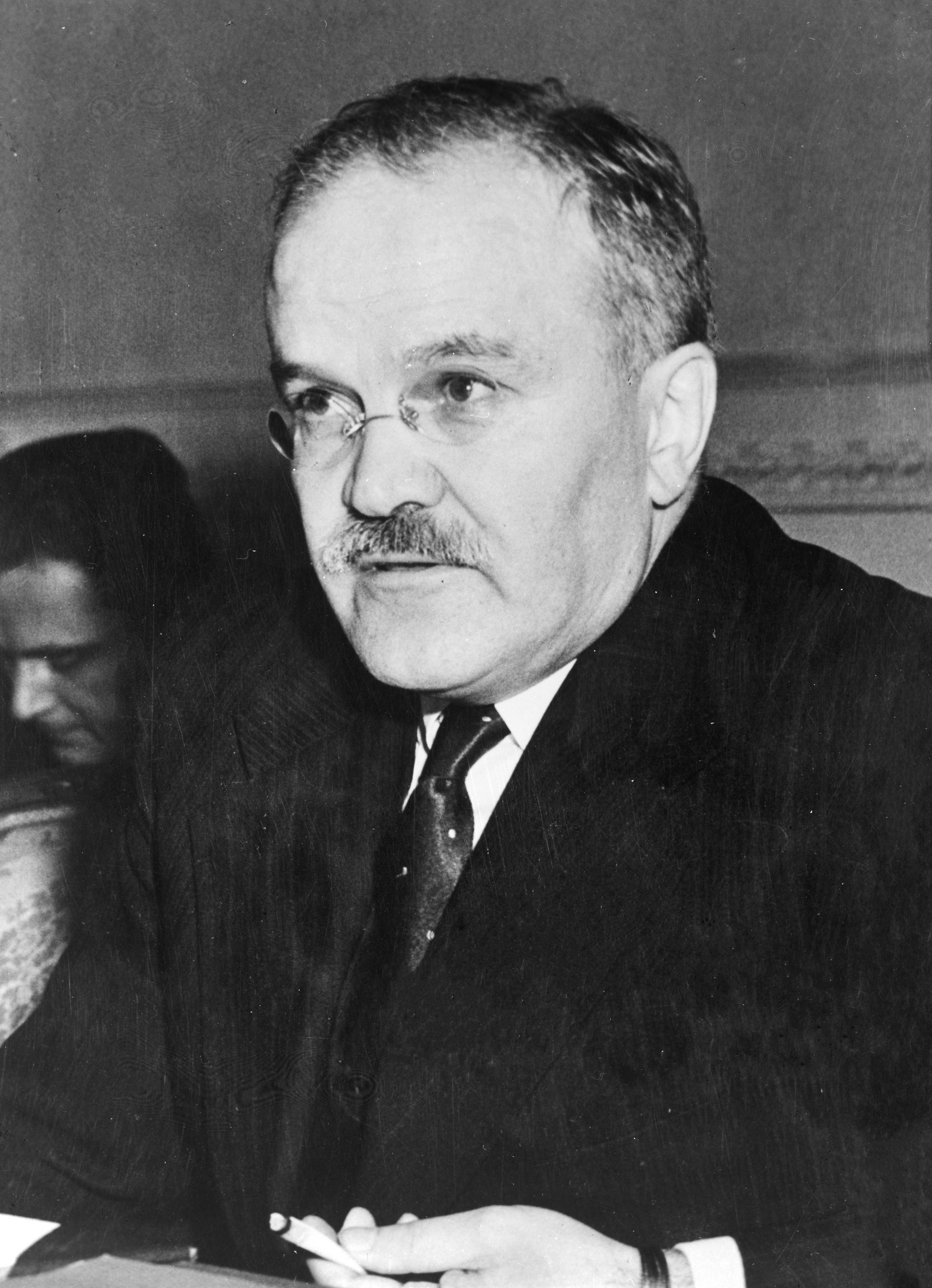
Vyacheslav Molotov (1945)

The name "Molotov cocktail" (Finnish: Molotovin cocktail) was coined by the Finns during the Winter War in 1939. The name was a pejorative reference to Soviet foreign minister Vyacheslav Molotov, who was one of the architects of the Molotov–Ribbentrop Pact on the eve of World War II.

The name's origin came from the propaganda Molotov produced during the Winter War, mainly his declaration on Soviet state radio that incendiary bombing missions over Finland were actually "airborne humanitarian food deliveries" for their "starving" neighbours. As a result, the Finns sarcastically dubbed the Soviet cluster bombs "Molotov bread baskets" (Finnish: Molotovin leipäkori). When the hand-held bottle firebomb was developed to attack and destroy Soviet tanks, the Finns called it the "Molotov cocktail", as "a drink to go with his food parcels".

Despite the now infamous name, the formal Finnish military term for the weapon type was, and continues to be, "burn-bottle" (Finnish: polttopullo, Fenno-Swedish: brännflaska).

=== Other names ===
The weapon most often known as the Molotov cocktail goes under a great variety of other names around the globe. Some are more formal than others but the weapon is often given a descriptive name in the respective language.

==== Synonyms and nicknames ====
- Bottle bomb
- Bottle grenade
- Burn bottle
- Burning bottle
- Fire bomb (not to be confused with other incendiary devices also known as firebombs)
- Fire bottle
- Flame bomb
- Flame bottle
- Gasoline bomb or Gas bomb – due to gasoline being a common filler (latter not to be confused with tear gas)
- Incendiary bottle
- Molly – abbreviation of Molotov cocktail (commonly used in video games)
- Molotov – abbreviation of Molotov cocktail
- Petrol bomb – due to petrol being a common filler, used often in the UK and Ireland
- Poor man's/peasant's grenade – due to its improvised nature
- Spanish: ponche ("punch"), poncho ("poncho")

==== Military nomenclature examples ====
- Finland – Finnish: polttopullo, ('burn-bottle') – Fenno-Swedish: brännflaska ('burn-bottle').
- Nazi Germany – German: Brandflasche ('fire bottle') – Brandhandgranate ('fire hand grenade').
- USSR – Russian: зажига́тельная буты́лка, romanized: zazhigátelnaya butýlka, lit. 'incendiary bottle' – Russian: буты́лка с горю́чей жи́дкостью, romanized: butýlka s goryúchey zhídkostyu, lit. 'bottle with combustible liquid'.
- Sweden – Swedish: brännflaska ('burn-bottle').
- United Kingdom – No. 76 special incendiary grenade – also known as "Grenade, Hand or Projector, Self Igniting Phosphorus Mk I" or "Incendiary, hand or rifle grenade, No. 76 Mk I.
- US – frangible grenade – incendiary frangible grenade – incendiary bottle grenade.

== Design ==
The simplest version of the Molotov cocktail consists of a container that breaks when it hits a hard surface (usually a breakable glass bottle), a flammable and incendiary liquid (contained in the bottle), and a piece of porous cloth that acts as a wick (inserted into the neck of the bottle and which dips into the flammable-incendiary liquid, being completely impregnated with it).

Sometimes, incisions are made on the glass bottle with a glass-cutting tool, to allow for easier shattering upon impact with the target.

The flammable-incendiary liquid can have a highly variable composition, for example:

- only gasoline (petrol)
- gasoline with gelling/thickening additives
- 2/3 gasoline and 1/3 motor oil or diesel fuel
- half gasoline and half kerosene
- mixture composed of petrol, paraffin and tar, obtained by mixing 1 part of the first two with 2 parts of the third
- mixture composed of equal parts of tar, kerosene and petrol, obtained by mixing tar and kerosene first, then adding the petrol, with the possible addition of sulfur
- improvised napalm, composed of a liquid hydrocarbon fuel (gasoline, fuel oil, diesel oil, kerosene, turpentine, benzol or benzene, toluol or toluene) mixed with soap powder or chips or with pieces of extruded polystyrene (XPS) foam (known colloquially as styrofoam).

Other flammable liquids, such as, ethanol, methanol, jet fuel, acetone, and isopropyl alcohol (rubbing alcohol), have been used in place of, or combined with, gasoline.

Gelled or paste type fuels are often preferred to raw gasoline for use in devices such as incendiary bottles: this type of fuel adheres more readily to the target and produces greater heat concentration. Other gelling/thickening agents, such as baking soda, petroleum jelly, strips of tyre tubing, nitrocellulose, rubber cement, have been added to promote adhesion of the burning liquid and to create clouds of thick, choking smoke.

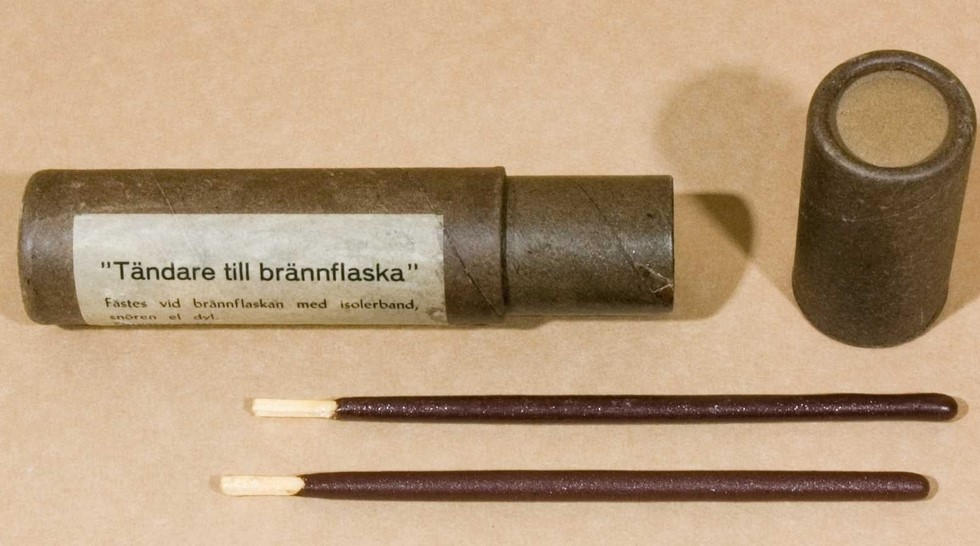
Match-style fuses for a Swedish, military grade Molotov cocktail "Brännflaska"

For winter warfare, storm matches may be attached to the side of the bottle for ignition, as these are less likely to be put out by wind.

Some bottles are fitted with ballast for improved throwing accuracy (such as filling 1/3 of the bottle with sand).

Typically, the operator lights the piece of cloth just before throwing the bottle at the target (such as a vehicle or fortification), making sure it is well secured and burning well to prevent it from coming loose or going out during the flight: when the bottle breaks, the flammable and incendiary liquid catches fire, engulfing the target in flames.

There also exist variations on the Molotov cocktail-concept where the bottle is filled with a smoke generating mixture such as sulfur trioxide dissolved in chlorosulfonic acid. These so-called "smoke bottles" do not need a source for ignition, as the mixture reacts with the air once the bottle is smashed.

== Development and use in war ==
Early uses

Around the late 1700s they were used in robberies and sabotages by outlaws and criminals. Since fuel was difficult to access, a lot of outlaws commonly used moonshine as an ingredient instead of gasoline.

=== Spanish Civil War ===
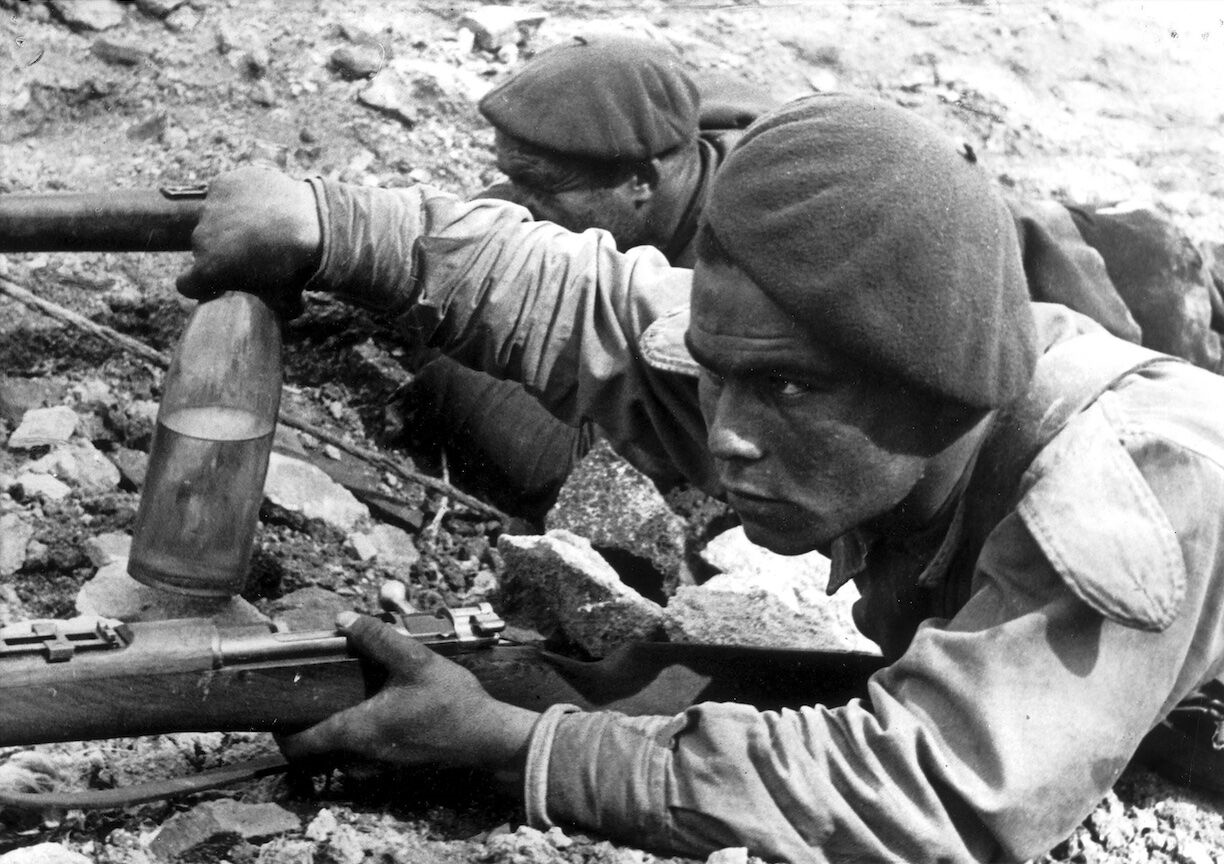
Monarchists during the Spanish Civil War with fire bottle (April 1937)

Improvised incendiary devices of this type were used in warfare for the first time in the Spanish Civil War between July 1936 and April 1939, before they became known as "Molotov cocktails". In 1936, General Francisco Franco ordered Spanish Nationalist forces to use the weapon against Soviet T-26 tanks supporting the Spanish Republicans in a failed assault on the Nationalist stronghold of Seseña, near Toledo, 40 km (25 mi) south of Madrid. After that, both sides used simple petrol bombs set fire with toxic gas or petrol-soaked blankets with some success. Tom Wintringham, a veteran of the International Brigades, later publicised his recommended method of using them:

We made use of "petrol bombs" roughly as follows: take a 2lb glass jam jar. Fill with petrol. Take a heavy curtain, half a blanket, or some other heavy material. Wrap this over the mouth of the jar, tie it round the neck with string, leave the ends of the material hanging free. When you want to use it have somebody standing by with a light [i.e., a source of ignition]. Put a corner of the material down in front of you, turn the bottle over so that petrol soaks out round the mouth of the bottle and drips on to this corner of the material. Turn the bottle right way up again, hold it in your right hand, most of the blanket bunched beneath the bottle, with your left hand take the blanket near the corner that is wetted with petrol. Wait for your tank. When near enough, your pal [or comrade-in-arms] lights the petrol soaked corner of the blanket. Throw the bottle and blanket as soon as this corner is flaring. (You cannot throw it far.) See that it drops in front of the tank. The blanket should catch in the tracks or in a cog-wheel, or wind itself round an axle. The bottle will smash, but the petrol should soak the blanket well enough to make a really healthy fire which will burn the rubber wheels on which the tank track runs, set fire to the carburettor or frizzle the crew. Do not play with these things. They are highly dangerous.

=== Khalkhin Gol ===
The Battle of Khalkhin Gol, a border conflict of 1939 ostensibly between Mongolia and Manchukuo, saw heavy fighting between Japanese and Soviet forces. Short of anti-tank equipment, Japanese infantry attacked Soviet tanks with gasoline-filled bottles. Japanese infantrymen claimed that several hundred Soviet tanks had been destroyed this way, though Soviet loss records do not support this assessment.

=== World War II ===
==== Finland ====
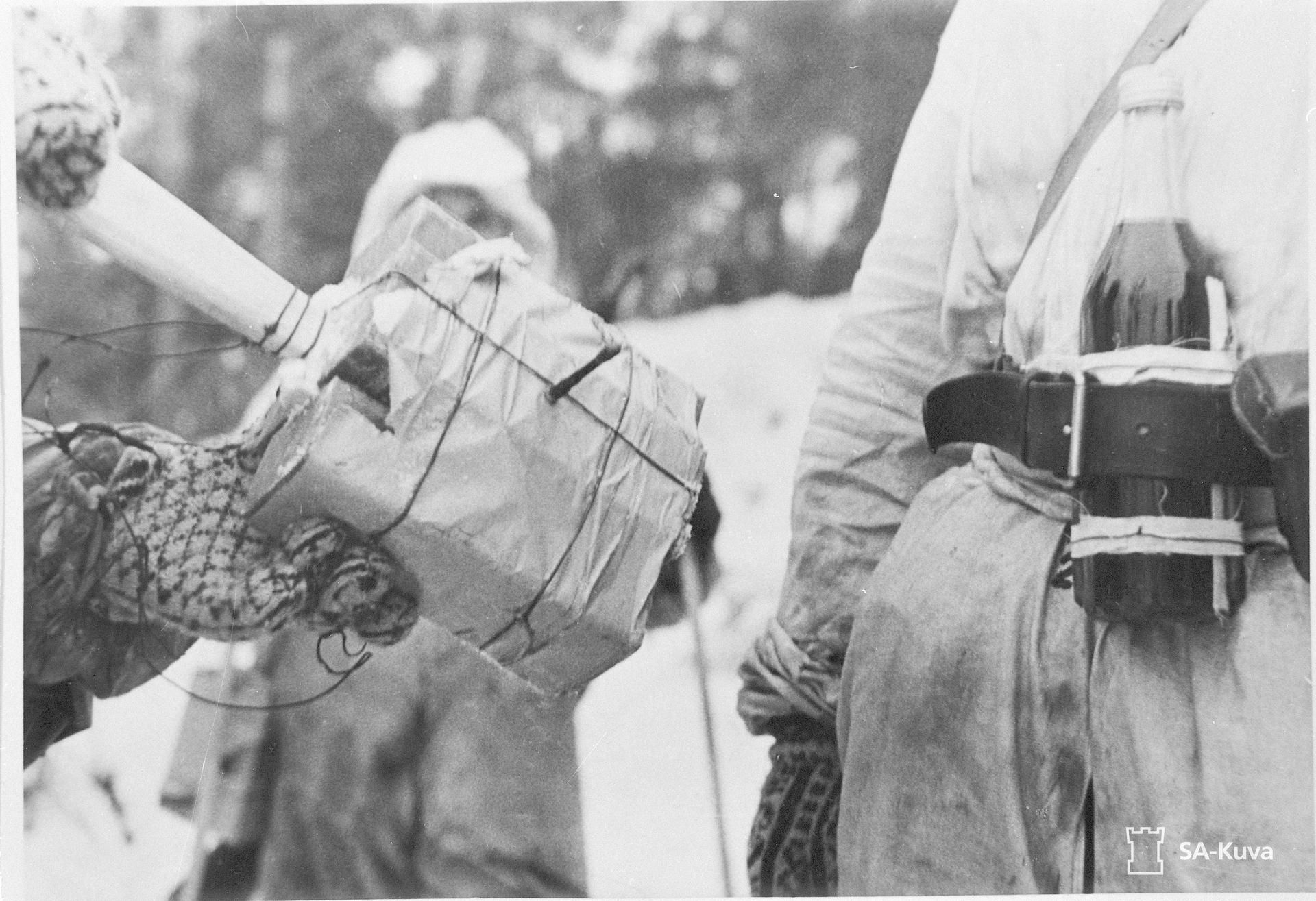
Finnish soldiers in the Winter War. Tanks were destroyed with satchel charges and Molotov cocktails. The bottle has storm matches instead of a rag for a fuse.

On 30 November 1939, the Soviet Union attacked Finland, starting what came to be known as the Winter War. The Finnish perfected the design and tactical use of the petrol bomb. The fuel for the Molotov cocktail was refined to a slightly sticky mixture of alcohol, kerosene, tar, and potassium chlorate. Further refinements included the attachment of wind-proof matches or a phial of chemicals that would ignite on breakage, thereby removing the need to pre-ignite the bottle, and leaving the bottle about one-third empty was found to make breaking more likely.

A British War Office report dated June 1940 noted that:

The Finns' policy was to allow the Russian tanks to penetrate their defences, even inducing them to do so by "canalising" them through gaps and concentrating their small arms fire on the infantry following them. The tanks that penetrated were taken on by gun fire in the open and by small parties of men armed with explosive charges and petrol bombs in the forests and villages... The essence of the policy was the separation of the AFVs from the infantry, as once on their own the tank has many blind spots and once brought to a stop can be disposed of at leisure.

Molotov cocktails were eventually mass-produced by the Alko corporation at its Rajamäki distillery, bundled with matches to light them. A 500 ml (0.53 US qt) bottle was filled with a mixture of petrol and paraffin, plus a small amount of tar. The basic bottle had two long pyrotechnic storm matches attached to either side. Before use, one or both of the matches were lit; when the bottle broke on impact, the mixture ignited. The storm matches were found to be safer to use than a burning rag on the mouth of the bottle. There was also an "A bottle". This replaced the matches with a small ampoule inside the bottle; it ignited when the bottle broke. By spring 1940 they had produced 542,104 bottles.

==== Great Britain ====
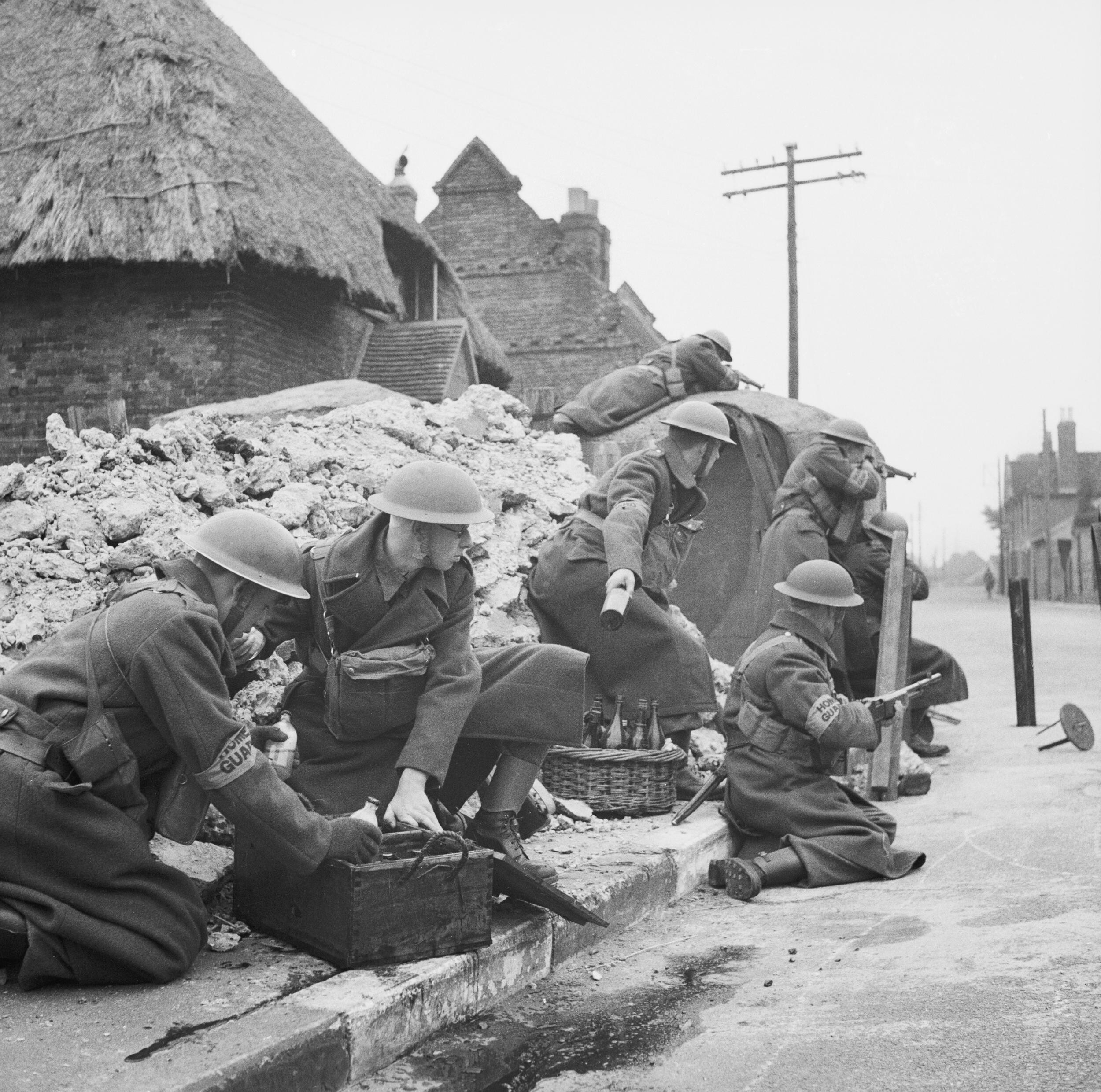
A squad of UK Home Guard soldiers training to defend a street with 'Molotov cocktail' petrol bombs (March 1941)

Early in 1940, with the prospect of immediate invasion of Great Britain, the possibilities of the petrol bomb gripped the imagination of the British public. For laypersons, the petrol bomb had the benefit of using entirely familiar and available materials, and they were quickly improvised in large numbers, with the intention of using them against enemy tanks.

The Finns had found that they were effective when used in the right way and in sufficient numbers. Although the experience of the Spanish Civil War received more publicity, the more sophisticated petroleum warfare tactics of the Finns were not lost on British commanders. In his 5 June address to LDV leaders, General Ironside said:

I want to develop this thing they developed in Finland, called the "Molotov cocktail", a bottle filled with resin, petrol and tar which if thrown on top of a tank will ignite, and if you throw half a dozen or more on it you have them cooked. It is quite an effective thing. If you can use your ingenuity, I give you a picture of a [road] block with two houses close to the block, overlooking it. There are many villages like that. Out of the top windows is the place to drop these things on the tank as it passes the block. It may only stop it for two minutes there, but it will be quite effective.

Wintringham advised that a tank that was isolated from supporting infantry was potentially vulnerable to men who had the required determination and cunning to get close. Rifles or even a shotgun would be sufficient to persuade the crew to close all the hatches, and then the view from the tank is very limited; a turret-mounted machine gun has a very slow traverse and cannot hope to fend off attackers coming from all directions. Once sufficiently close, it is possible to hide where the tank's gunner cannot see: "The most dangerous distance away from a tank is 200 yards; the safest distance is six inches." Petrol bombs will soon produce a pall of blinding smoke, and a well-placed explosive package or even a stout iron bar in the tracks can immobilise the vehicle, leaving it at the mercy of further petrol bombs – which will suffocate the engine and possibly the crew – or an explosive charge or anti-tank mine.

By August 1940, the War Office produced training instructions for the creation and use of Molotov cocktails. The instructions suggested scoring the bottles vertically with a diamond to ensure breakage and providing fuel-soaked rag, windproof matches or a length of cinema film (then composed of highly flammable nitrocellulose) as a source of ignition.

On 29 July 1940, manufacturers Albright & Wilson of Oldbury demonstrated to the RAF how their white phosphorus could be used to ignite incendiary bombs. The demonstration involved throwing glass bottles containing a mixture of petrol and phosphorus at pieces of wood and into a hut. On breaking, the phosphorus was exposed to the air and spontaneously ignited; the petrol also burned, resulting in a fierce fire. Because of safety concerns, the RAF was not interested in white phosphorus as a source of ignition, but the idea of a self-igniting petrol bomb took hold. Initially known as an A.W. bomb, it was officially named the No. 76 Grenade, but more commonly known as the SIP (Self-Igniting Phosphorus) grenade. The perfected list of ingredients was white phosphorus, benzene, water and a two-inch strip of raw rubber; all in a half-pint bottle sealed with a crown stopper. Over time, the rubber would slowly dissolve, making the contents slightly sticky, and the mixture would separate into two layers – this was intentional, and the grenade should not be shaken to mix the layers, as this would only delay ignition. When thrown against a hard surface, the glass would shatter and the contents would instantly ignite, liberating choking fumes of phosphorus pentoxide and sulfur dioxide as well as producing a great deal of heat. Strict instructions were issued to store the grenades safely, preferably underwater and certainly never in a house. Mainly issued to the Home Guard as an anti-tank weapon, it was produced in vast numbers; by August 1941 well over 6,000,000 had been manufactured.

There were many who were sceptical about the efficacy of Molotov cocktails and SIP grenades against the more modern German tanks. Weapon designer Stuart Macrae witnessed a trial of the SIP grenades at Farnborough: "There was some concern that, if the tank drivers could not pull up quickly enough and hop out, they were likely to be frizzled to death, but after looking at the bottles they said they would be happy to take a chance." The drivers were proved right; trials on modern British tanks confirmed that Molotov and SIP grenades caused the occupants of the tanks "no inconvenience whatsoever."

Wintringham, though enthusiastic about improvised weapons, cautioned against a reliance on petrol bombs and repeatedly emphasised the importance of using explosive charges.

==== United States ====
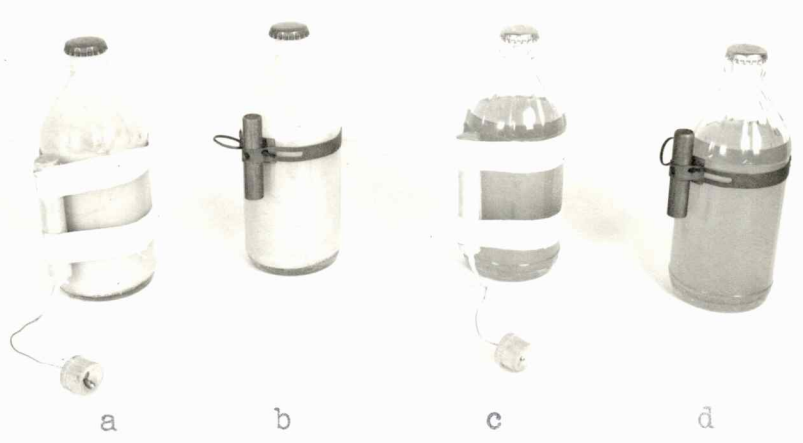
Frangible Grenades Viscolized Oil Types

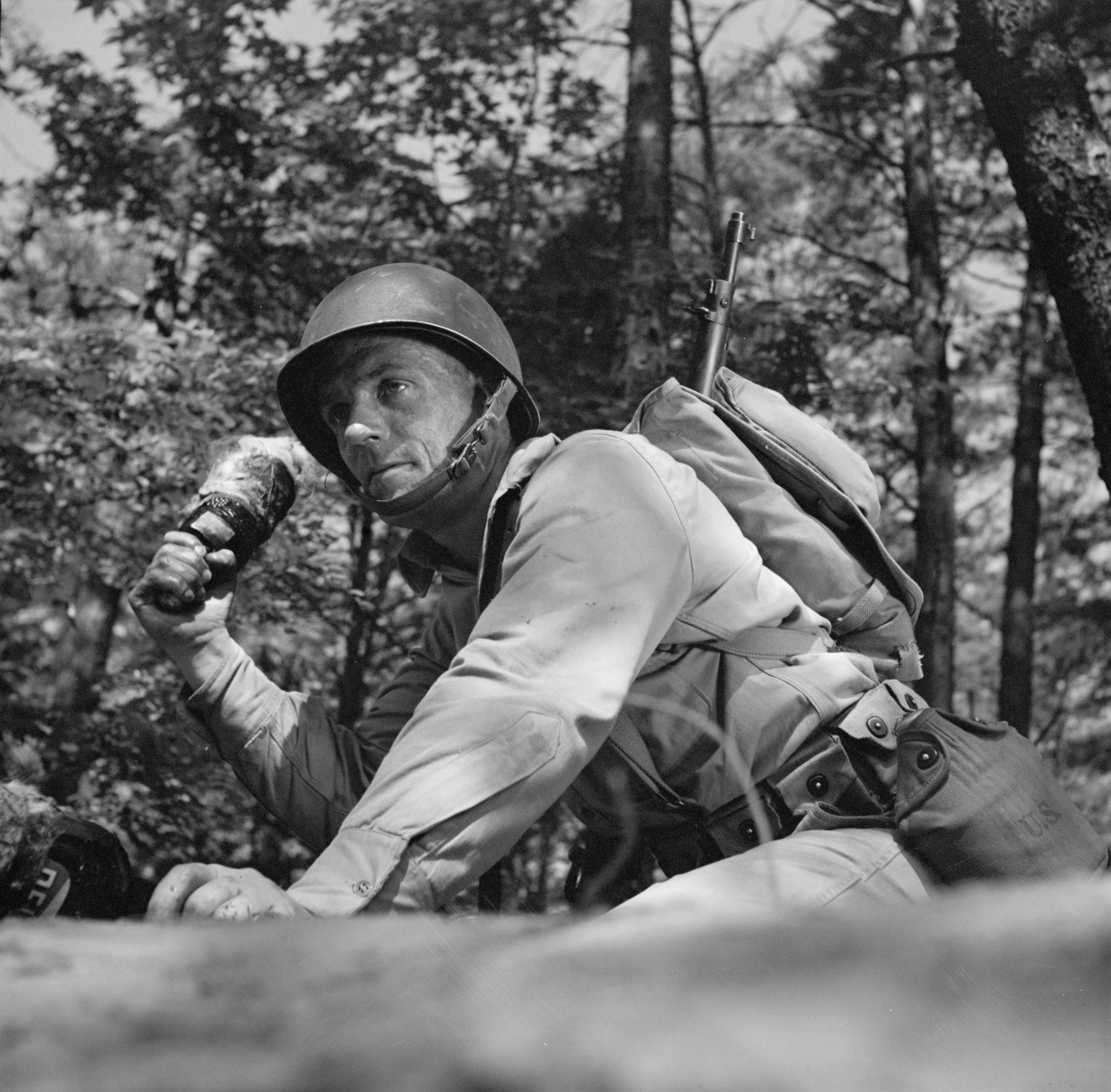
U.S. soldier preparing to throw a Molotov cocktail at Ft. Belvoir in August 1942

The U.S. army designated Molotov cocktails as frangible grenades. They presented a notable amount of variations, from those that used thin fuel with varied ignition systems, to those that used obscurants and chemical weapons. Various frangible grenade designs were developed, with those investiged by the NDRC showing the highest technological level. These incendiary devices employed the most technologically advanced fillers in the conflict.

The M1 frangible grenade was the standard US device, but each division of the army could come up with its own. Two non-industrial models of these grenades were developed and manufactured in a certain quantity. In all, about five thousand were manufactured. The frangible grenades featured standardized chemical igniters, some were specific to each flammable filler. Two preliminary fillings were investigated, with napalm and IM being the standard fuels.

Most of the frangible devices were made in an improvised way, with no standardization regarding the bottle and filling. The frangible grenades were eventually declared obsolete, due to the very limited destructive effect.

1107 frangible, M1, NP type were supplied to the navy and its units for field use at Iwo Jima. The United States Marine Corps developed a version during World War II that used a tube of nitric acid and a lump of metallic sodium to ignite a mixture of petrol and diesel fuel.

Improvised developments were made during the pos-WWII, all using fuels thickened with napalm; the most notorious was "The Eagle Cocktail" and "The Eagle Fire Ball".

==== Other fronts of World War II ====
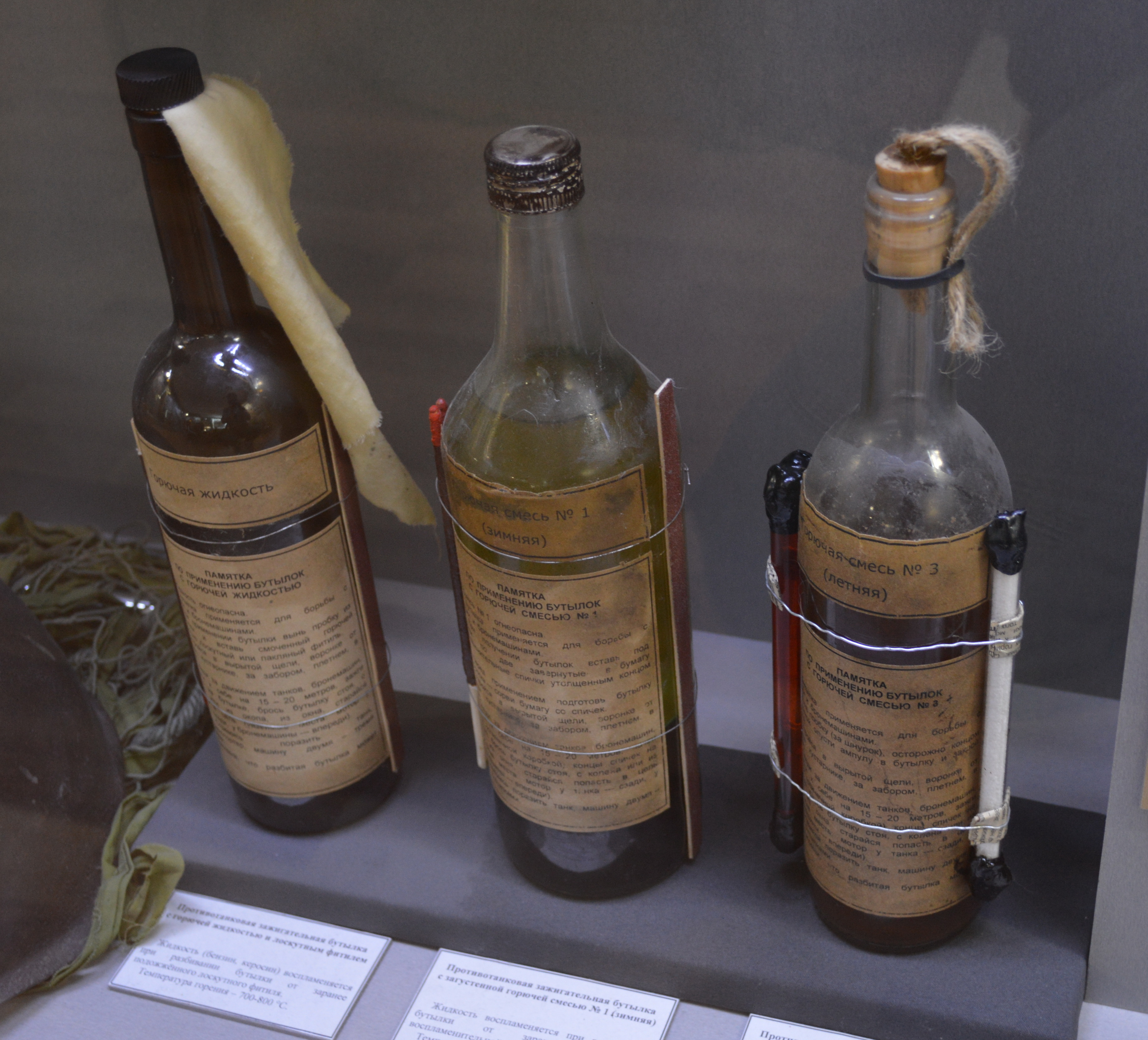
Different models of Red Army Molotov cocktails, preserved in the Kostroma museum-reserve (World War II period)

The Polish Home Army developed a version which ignited on impact without the need of a wick. Ignition was caused by a reaction between concentrated sulfuric acid mixed with the fuel and a mixture of potassium chlorate and sugar which was crystallized from solution onto a rag attached to the bottle.

During the Norwegian campaign in 1940 the Norwegian Army lacking suitable anti-tank weaponry had to rely on petrol bombs and other improvised weapons to fight German armored vehicles. Instructions from Norwegian High Command sent to army units in April 1940 encouraged soldiers to start ad-hoc production of "Hitler cocktails" (a different take on the Finnish nickname for the weapon) to combat tanks and armored cars. During the campaign there were instances of petrol bombs being relatively effective against the lighter tanks employed in Norway by Germany, such as the Panzer I and Panzer II.

==== The first Indochina War and Vietnam War ====
During national resistance, the Vietminh made Molotov cocktails to combat French tanks and armored vehicles. In the Vietnam war, during the struggle movement of Saigon students during resistance against America to save the country, a prominent event was the students occupying the Cambodian Embassy to protest against the Lon Nol government's murder of overseas Vietnamese. The defense was well-arranged with all the weapons available and those taken from the field police. They also made hundreds of petrol bombs from easily available materials such as foam and rubber crepe stuffed into coke bottles, sardine bottles filled with petrol..., a terrifying weapon for the field police.

=== The Troubles ===
During the Troubles, both the Provisional Irish Republican Army (PIRA) and civilians used petrol bombs, although with different uses. Civilians tended to use petrol bombs and rocks against police officers in riots; however, the PIRA tended to use them in attacks rather than in self-defence. Over time, as the PIRA became more co-ordinated, it shifted to using IEDs rather than petrol bombs.

=== Modern warfare ===
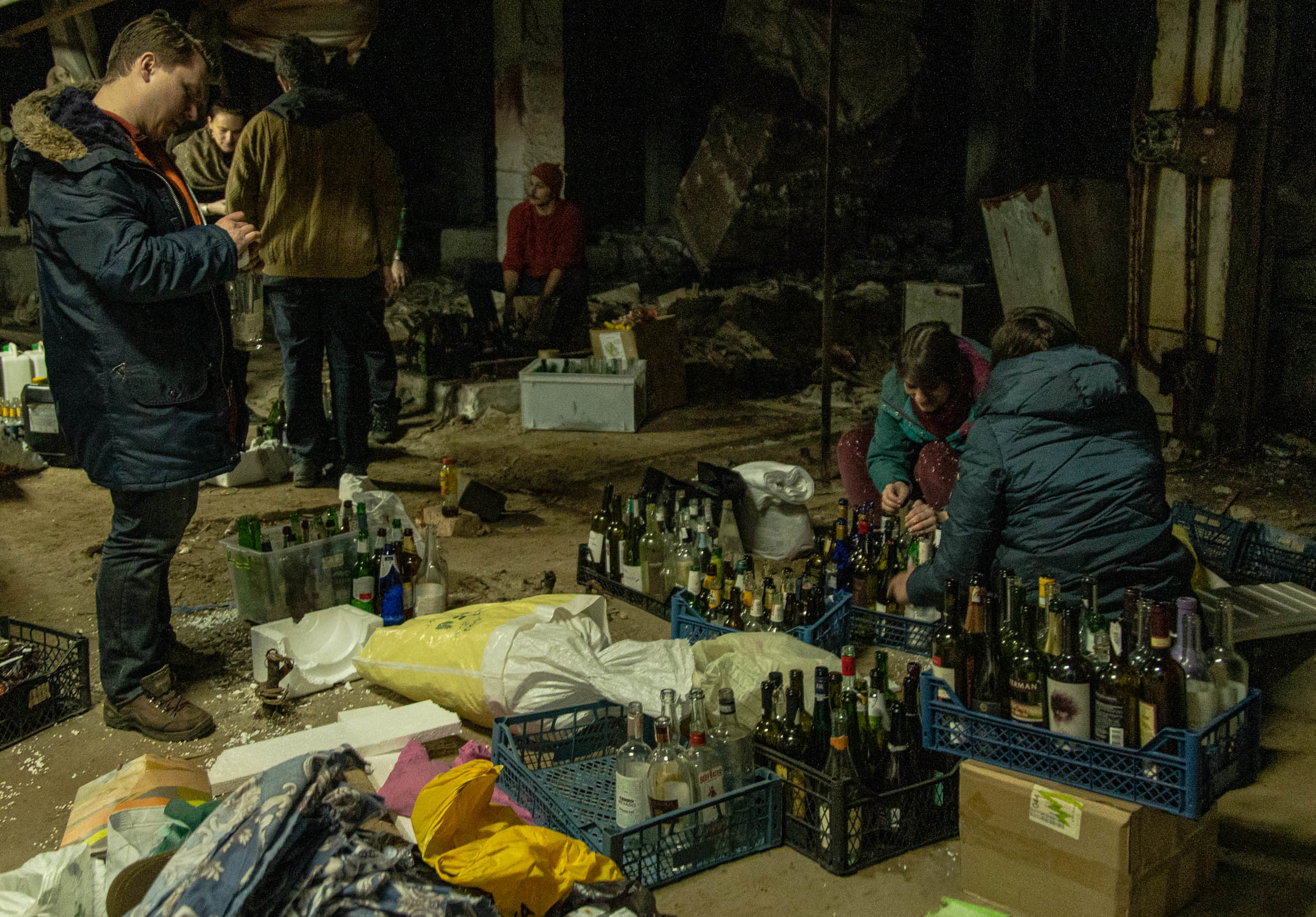
Civilians in Kyiv preparing Molotov cocktails for use during the 2022 Russian invasion of Ukraine

During the Second Battle of Fallujah in 2004, U.S. Marines employed Molotov cocktails made with "one part liquid laundry detergent, two parts gas [gasoline]" while clearing houses "when contact is made in a house and the enemy must be burned out". The tactic "was developed in response to the enemy's tactics" of guerrilla warfare and particularly martyrdom tactics which often resulted in U.S. Marine casualties. The cocktail was a less expedient alternative to white phosphorus mortar rounds or propane tanks detonated with C4 (nicknamed the "House Guest"), all of which proved effective at burning out engaged enemy combatants.

During the 2022 Russian invasion of Ukraine, the Ukrainian Defense Ministry told civilians to make Molotov cocktails, locally called "Bandera smoothies", to fight Russian troops. The defense ministry distributed a recipe for producing Molotov cocktails to civilians through Ukrainian television, which included the use of styrofoam as a thickening agent to aid in helping the burning liquid stick to vehicles or other targets. The Pravda Brewery of Lviv, which converted from making beer to Molotov cocktails, said that its recipe was 3 cups (~720 mL) polystyrene, 2 cups (~480 mL) grated soap, 500 mL gasoline, 100 mL oil, and 1 jumbo tampon as a fuse. The Russian media control organisation Roskomnadzor sued Twitter for not removing instructions for how to prepare and use molotov cocktails, so that Twitter had to pay a fine of 3 million roubles (US$41,000).

== Civilian use ==
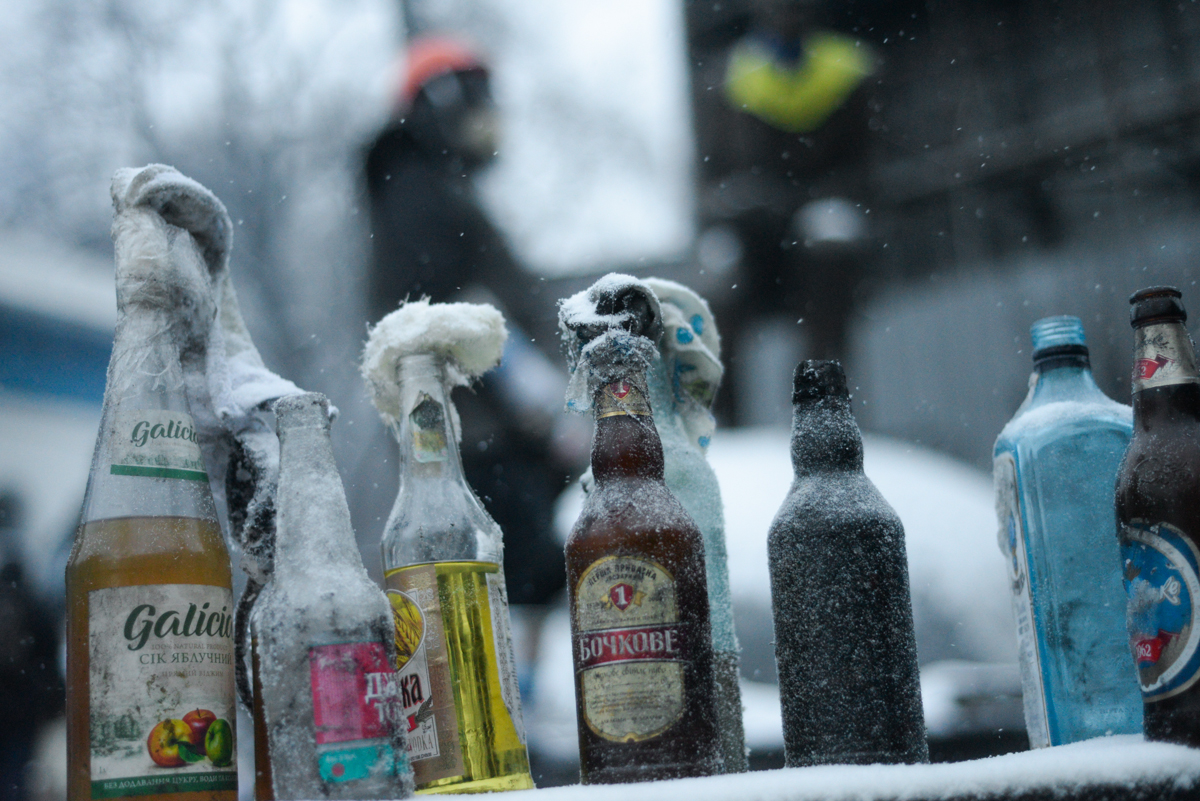
Molotov cocktails produced for use in the Ukrainian Euromaidan protests, 21 January 2014

Molotov cocktails were reportedly used in the United States for arson attacks on shops and other buildings during the 1992 Los Angeles riots.

Molotov cocktails were used by protesters and civilian militia in Ukraine during Euromaidan and the Revolution of Dignity. Protesters during the Ferguson riots also used Molotov cocktails.

In Bangladesh, during anti-government protests in 2013 and 2014, many buses and cars were targeted with petrol bombs. A number of people burned to death and many more were injured due to these attacks.

During the 2019–20 Hong Kong protests, riots broke out and Molotov cocktails were used to attack the police and create roadblocks. They were also used to attack an MTR station, causing severe damage. A journalist was also struck by a Molotov cocktail during the protests.

Molotov cocktails were used by some during the riots following the 2020 George Floyd protests in the United States.

In 2025, a man in Boulder, Colorado, United States used a Molotov cocktail and an improvised flamethrower to attack a group of peaceful demonstrators calling for the release of Israeli hostages.

=== Non-incendiary variants ===
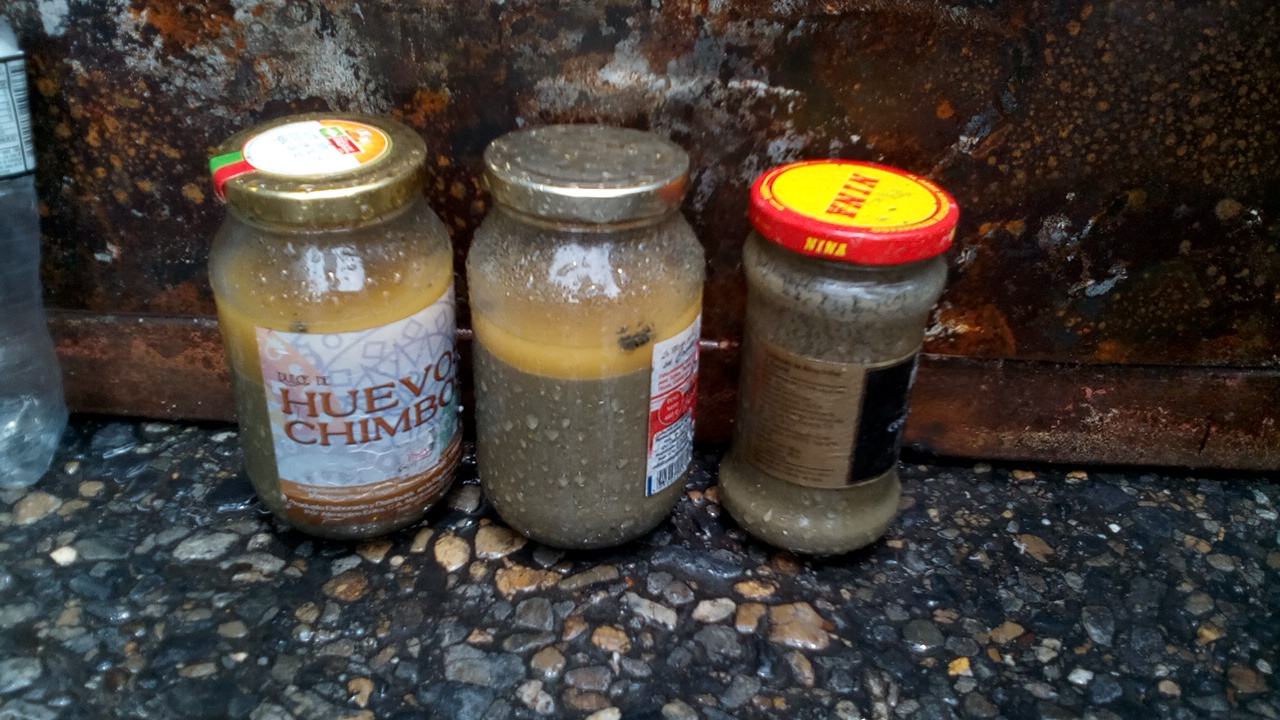
Puputovs seen during the 2017 Venezuelan protests

During the 2014–17 Venezuelan protests, protesters used Molotov cocktails similar to those used by demonstrators in other countries. As the 2017 Venezuelan protests intensified, demonstrators began using "Puputovs" (a portmanteau of the words "poo-poo" and "Molotov"), with glass containers filled with excrement being thrown at authorities after the PSUV ruling-party official, Jacqueline Faría, mocked protesters who had to crawl through sewage in Caracas' Guaire River to avoid tear gas.

On 8 May, the hashtag #puputov became the top trending hashtag on Twitter in Venezuela, as reports of authorities vomiting after being drenched in excrement began to circulate. A month later, on 4 June 2017, during protests against Donald Trump in Portland, Oregon, police claimed protesters began throwing balloons filled with "unknown, foul-smelling liquid" at officers.

== Legality ==
As incendiary devices, Molotov cocktails are illegal to manufacture or possess in many regions.

=== In Canada ===
In Canada, Molotov cocktails are considered an "explosive substance" under the Criminal Code (Canada) and possession is illegal. Under section 82: "Possession of explosive (1) Every person who, without lawful excuse, makes or has in their possession or under their care or control any explosive substance is guilty of (a) an indictable offence and liable to imprisonment for a term of not more than five years; or (b) an offence punishable on summary conviction."

=== In the United Kingdom ===
In the United Kingdom, molotov cocktails are considered illegal under the Explosive Substances Act 1883.

=== In the United States ===
In the United States, Molotov cocktails are considered "destructive devices" under the National Firearms Act and are regulated by the ATF. Wil Casey Floyd, from Elkhart Lake, Wisconsin, was arrested after throwing Molotov cocktails at Seattle police officers during a protest in May 2016; he pleaded guilty for using the incendiary devices in February 2018.

In Simpson County, Kentucky, 20-year-old Trey Alexander Gwathney-Law attempted to burn Franklin-Simpson County Middle School with five Molotov cocktails; he was found guilty of making and possessing illegal firearms and was sentenced to 20 years in prison in 2018.

== Symbolism ==
Due to the Molotov's ease of production and use by civilian forces, the Molotov cocktail has become a symbol of civil uprising and revolution. The Molotov's extensive use by civilian and partisan forces has also thereby led to the Molotov becoming a symbol representing civil unrest. The contrast of a Molotov cocktail and an organized force has become a popular symbol in popular culture, and is often utilized as a weapon in various video games.

== Gallery ==
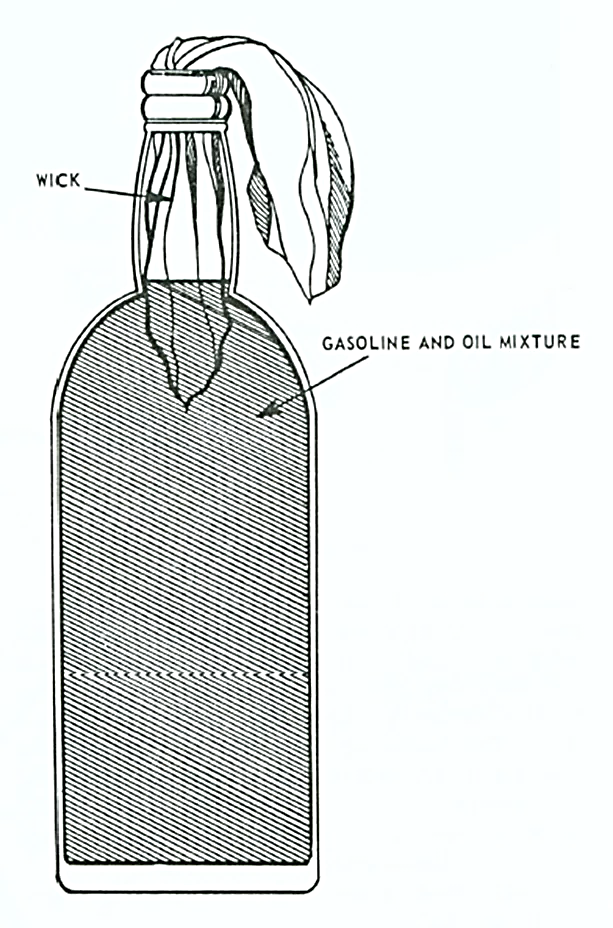
"Standard" Molotov cocktail

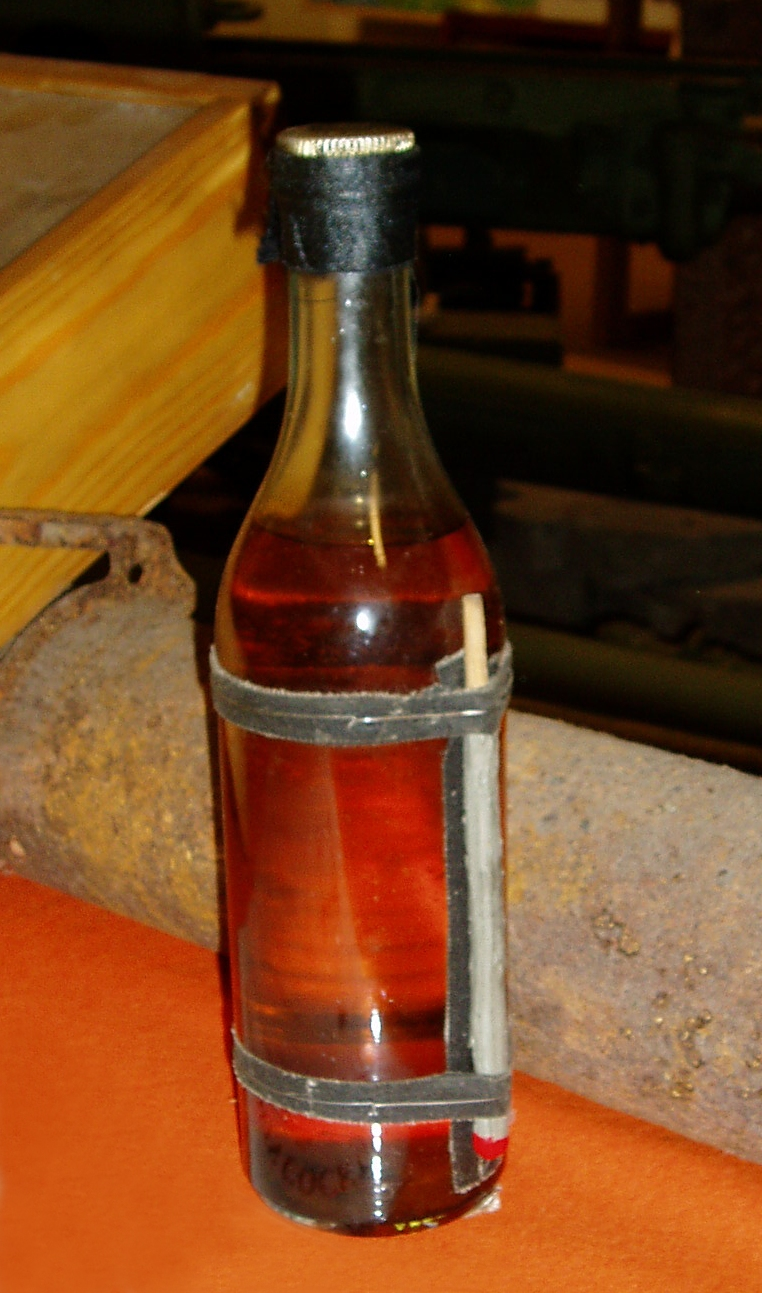
Finnish Army Molotov cocktail (Winter War period)

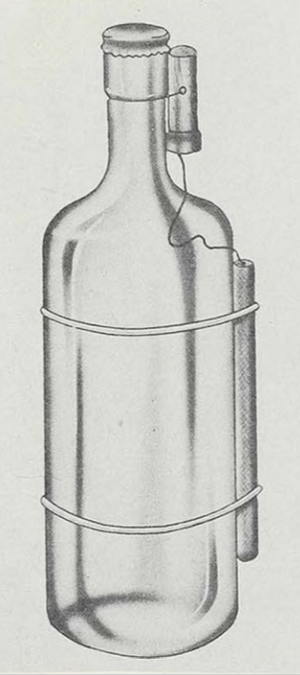
Royal Italian Army Molotov cocktail (World War II period)

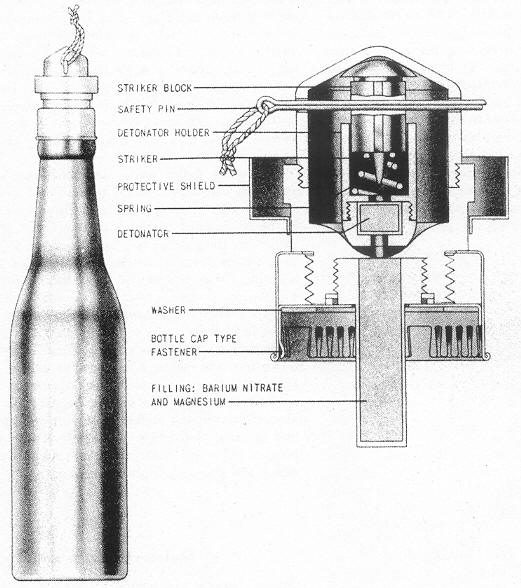
Imperial Japanese Army Molotov cocktail (World War II period). This model was equipped with an "all-way" action fuze.

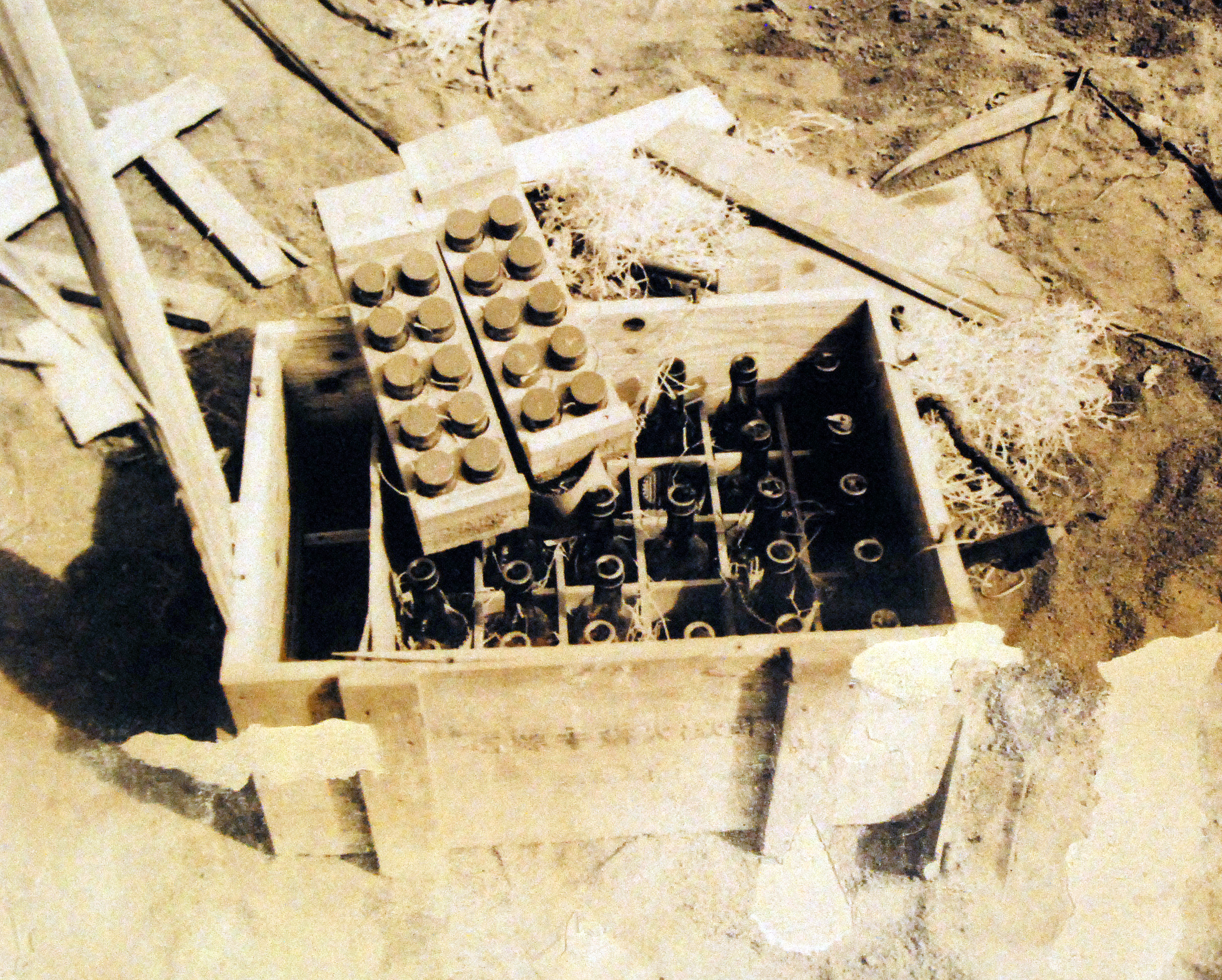
Crate of Imperial Japanese Army Molotov cocktails, with disconnected fuzes, captured by U.S. troops during the Battle of Iwo Jima (February-March 1945)

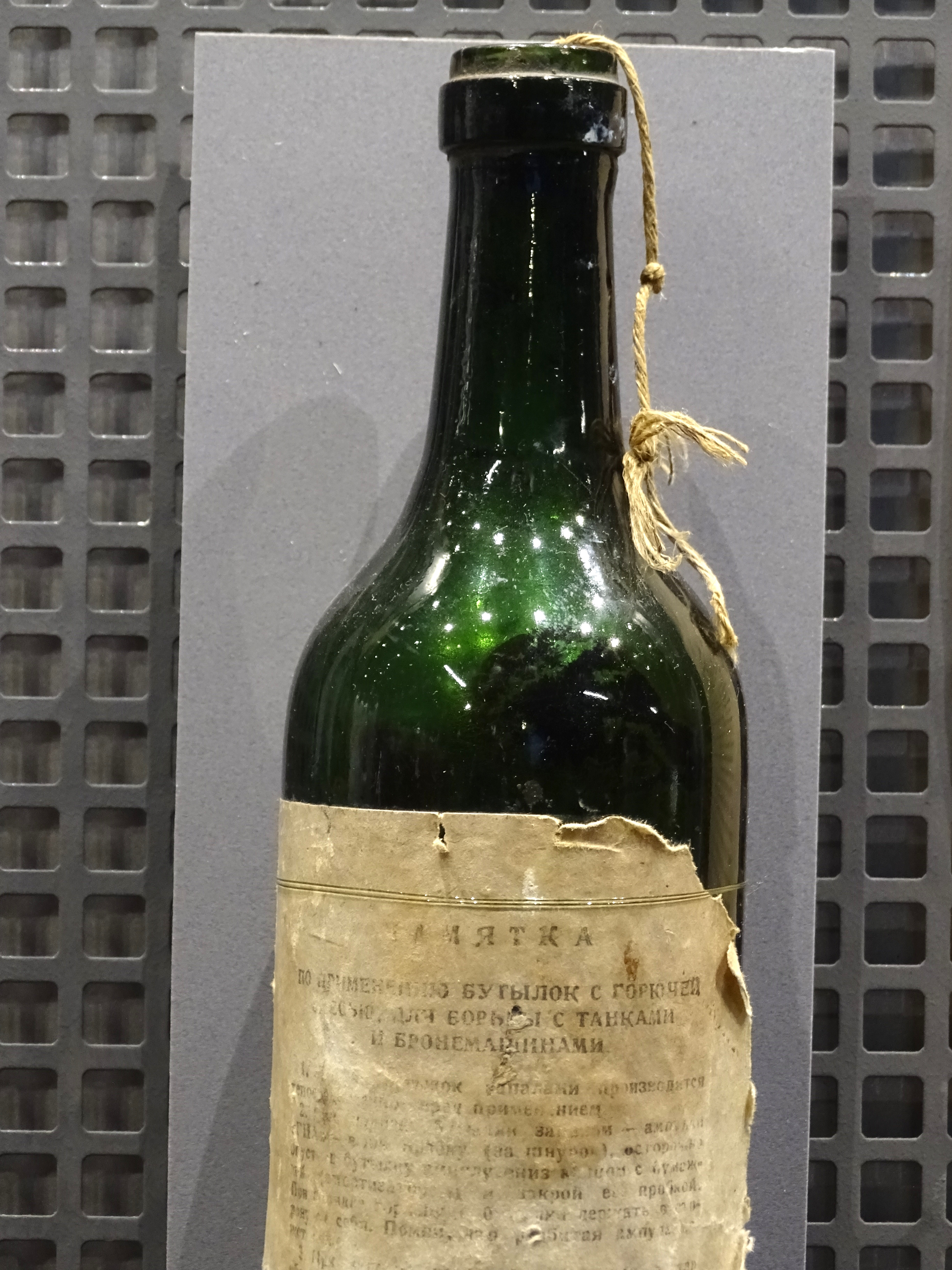
Red Army Molotov cocktail (World War II period)

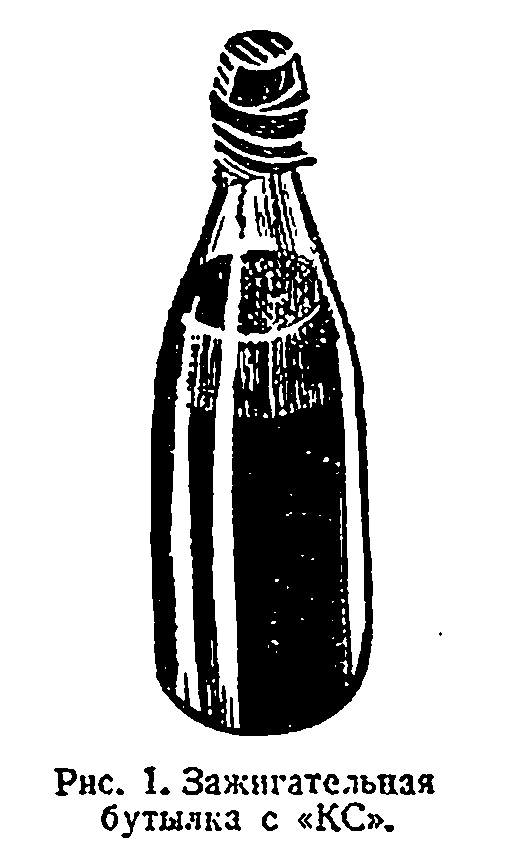
Red Army KS (Russian: КС) Molotov cocktail (World War II period). This model was filled with a self-igniting incendiary liquid, a mixture of phosphorus and sulfur, capable of burning for up to 3 minutes and reaching a temperature of up to 1000 °C.

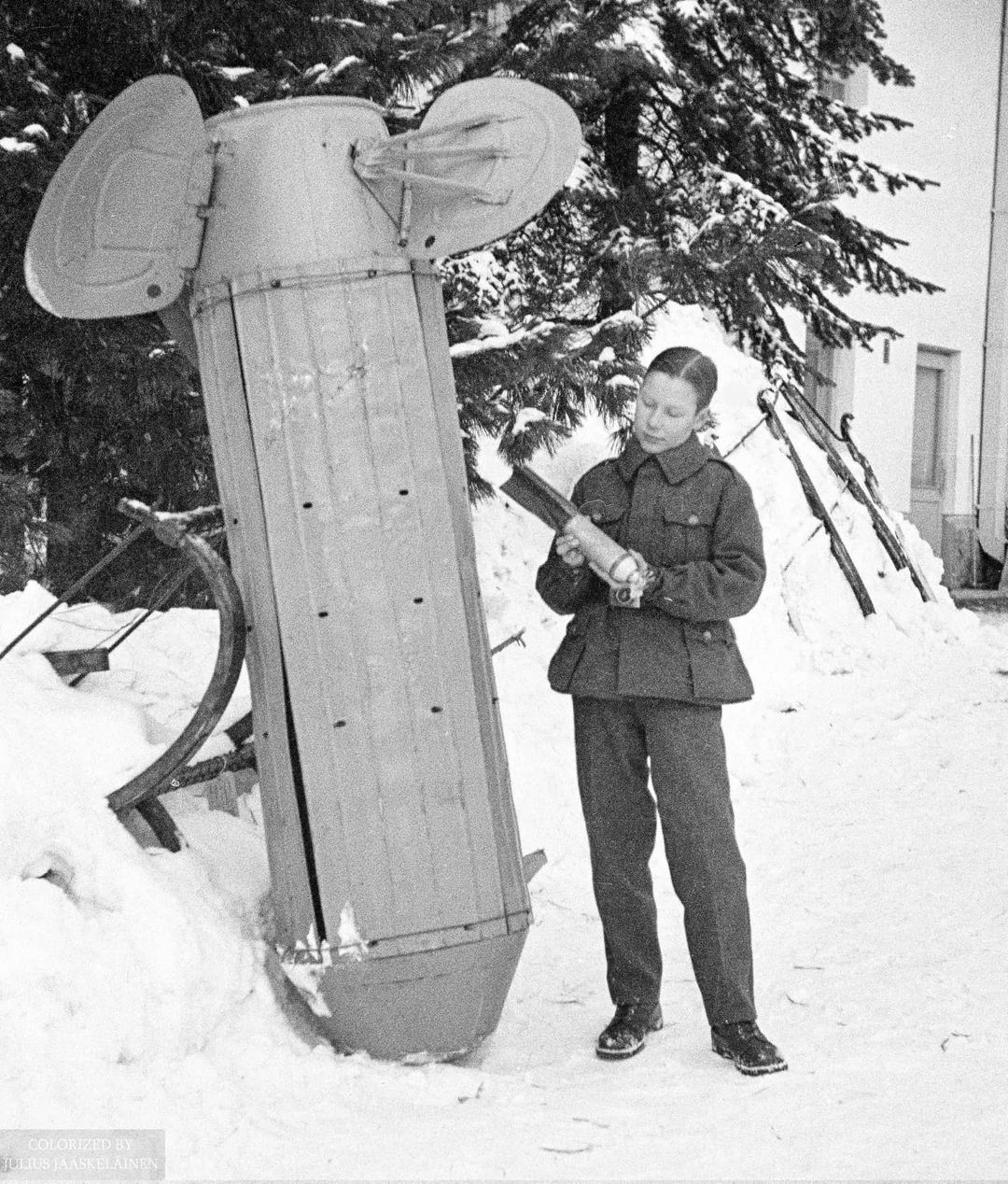
Soviet RRAB-3 aeronautical bomb, nicknamed "Molotov bread basket" (Winter War period)

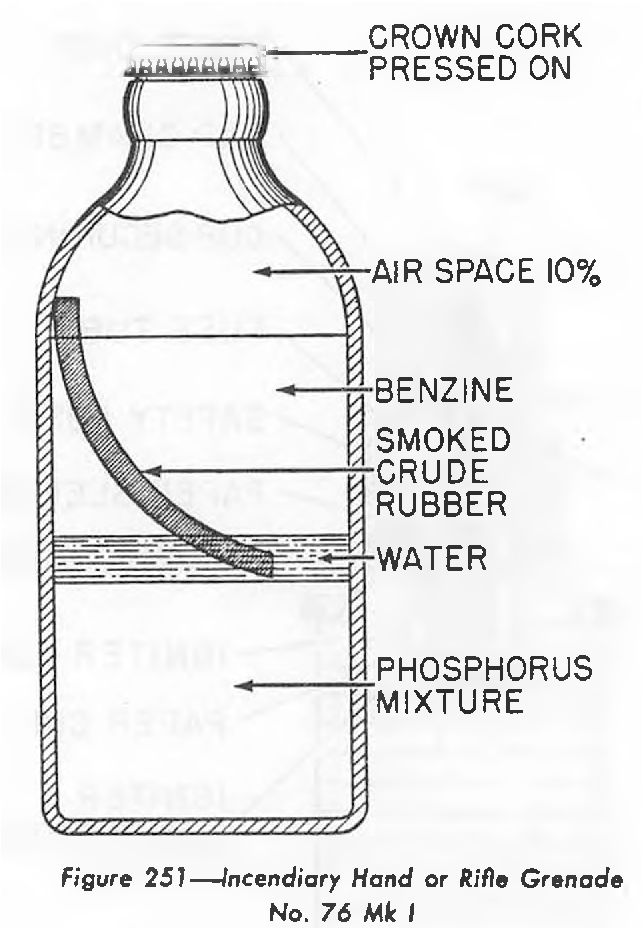
British Army No. 76 Mk I Molotov cocktail (World War II period)

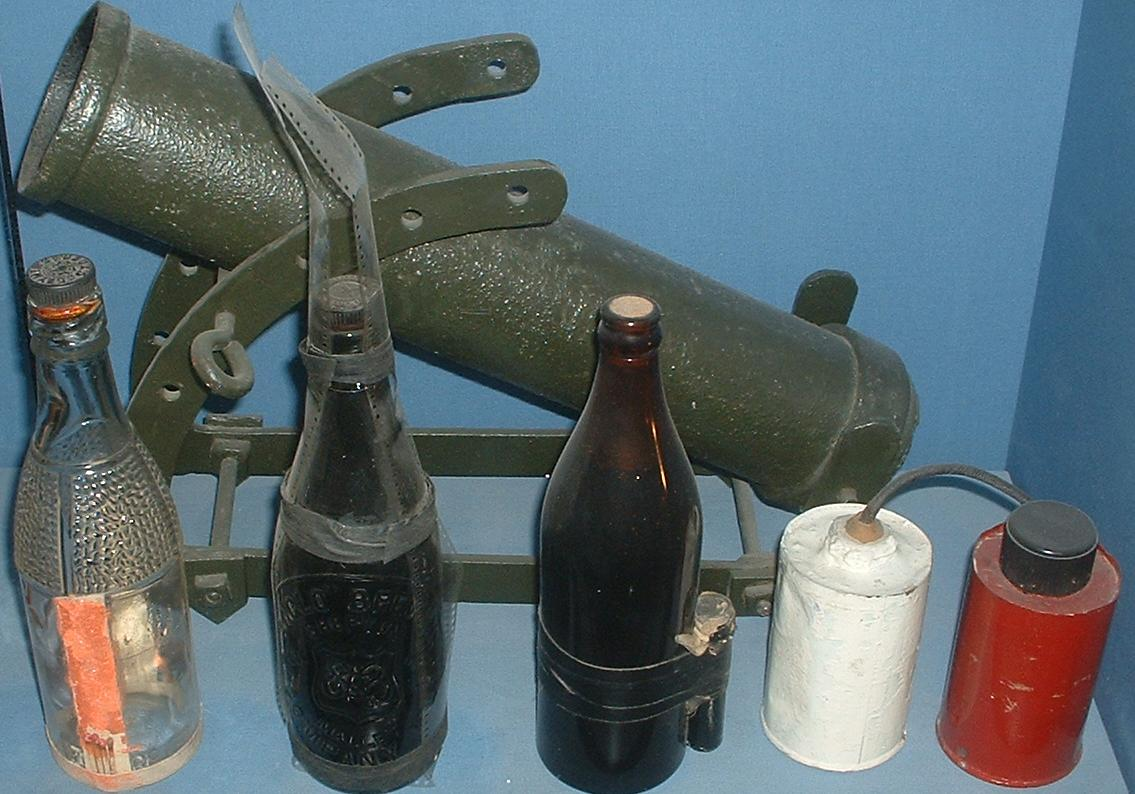
British Home Guard improvised weapons. Three Molotov cocktails are visible (World War II period).

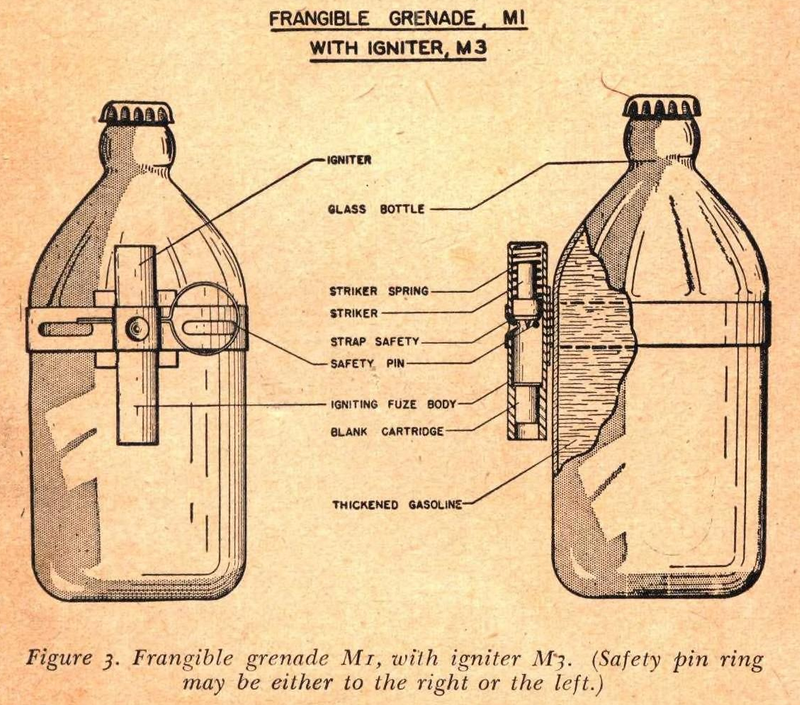
U.S. Army Frangible Grenade M1 Molotov cocktail (World War II period)

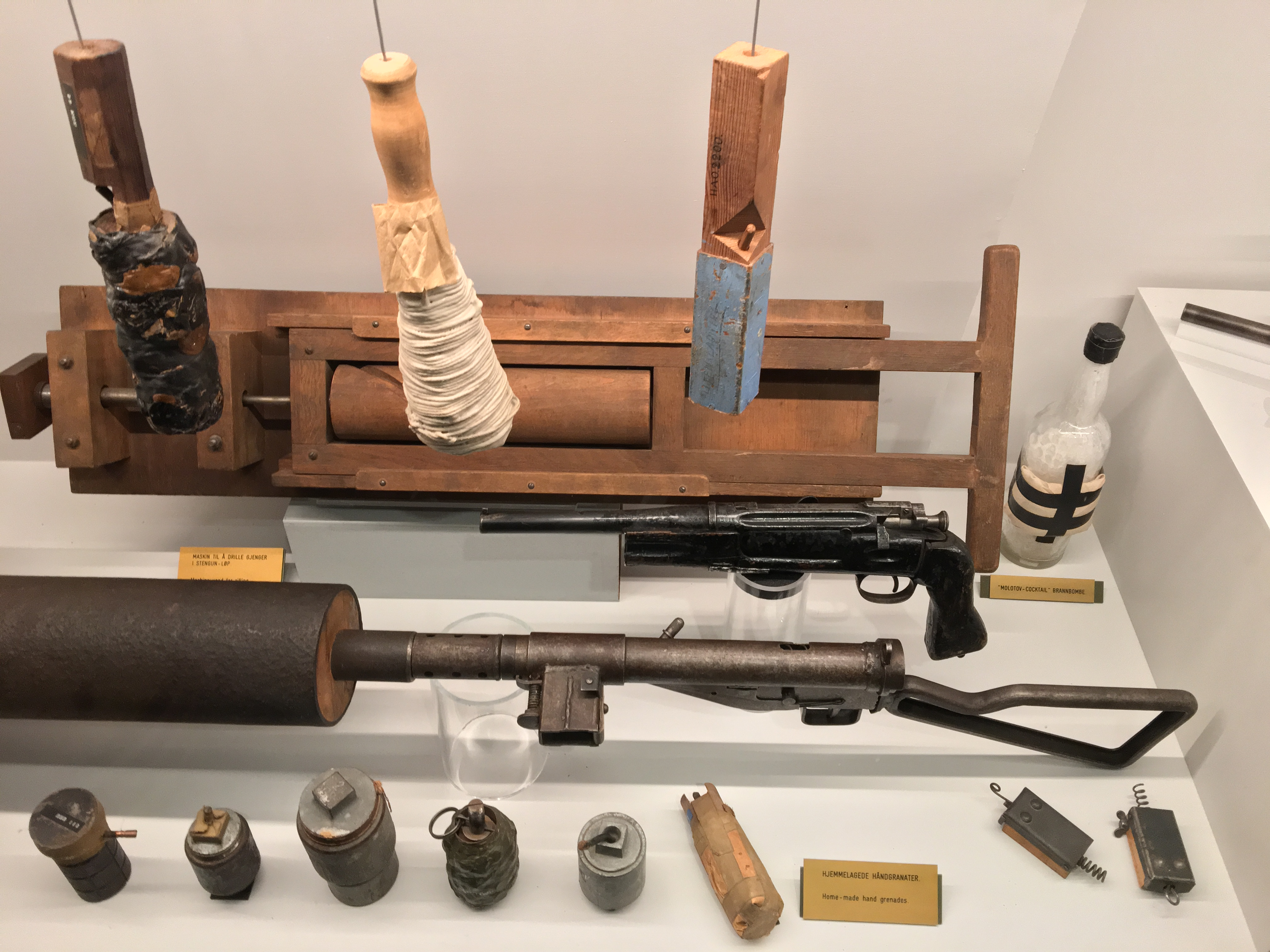
Norwegian resistance improvised weapons. One Molotov cocktail is visible (World War II period).

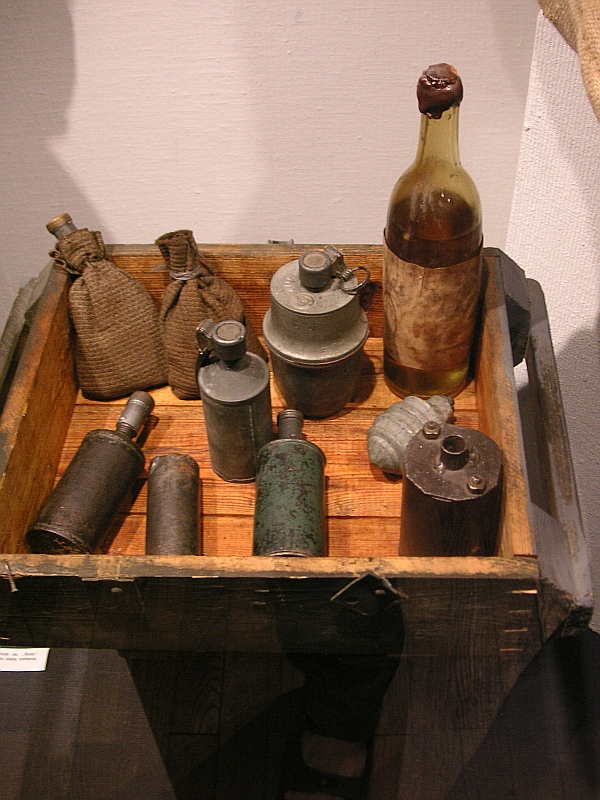
Warsaw Uprising improvised weapons. One Molotov cocktail is visible (1944).

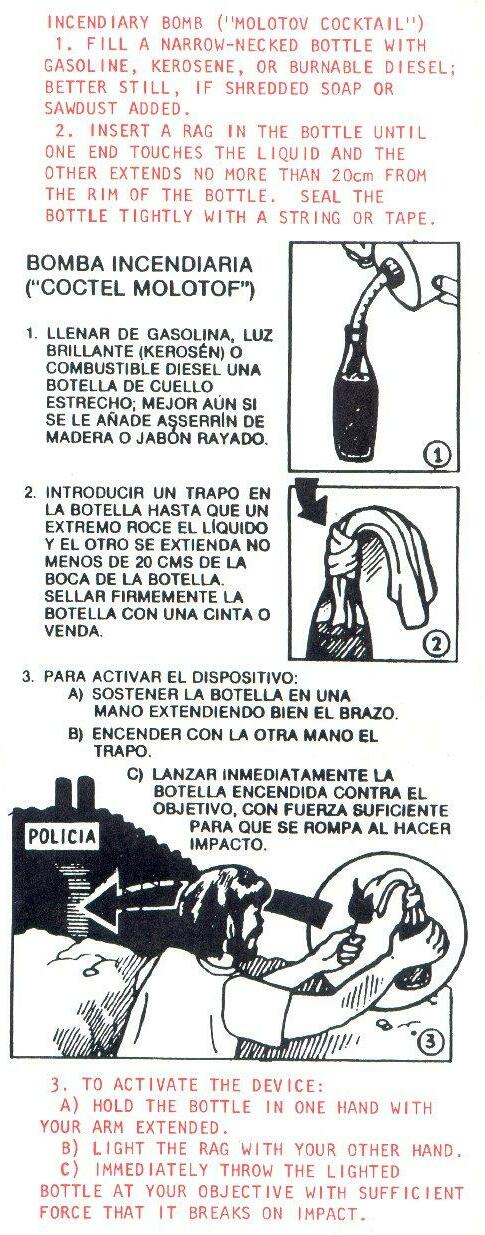
Molotov cocktail description contained in a CIA pamphlet (1983)

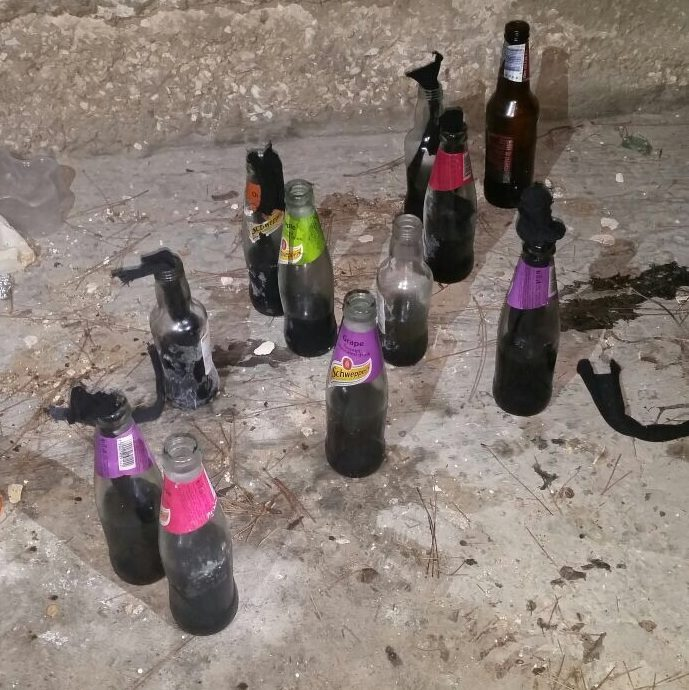
Palestinian Molotov cocktails (2015)

== See also ==
- Greek fire – Byzantine incendiary weapon
- Flamethrower – Ranged incendiary device
- Improvised explosive device – Unconventionally produced bomb
- Improvised firearm – Makeshift ranged weapon
- Insurgency weapons and tactics – Warfare by small groups against regular forces
- No. 73 grenade
- TM 31-210 Improvised Munitions Handbook – United States Army manual
- Urban guerrilla warfare – Warfare by small groups against regular forces
