= Frangible Grenade M1 =

Grenade made from breakable glass

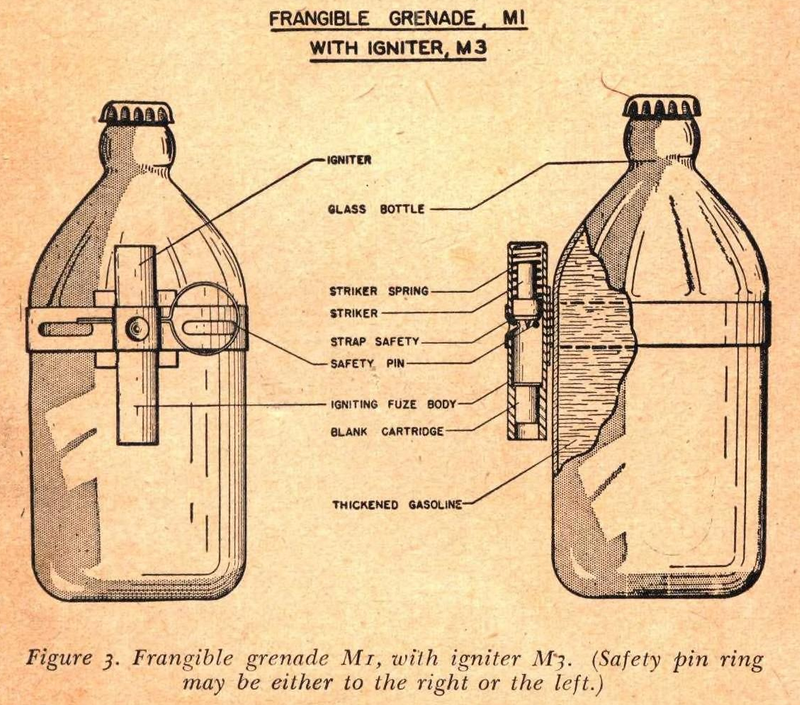
- Type: Incendiary grenade Chemical grenade
- Place of origin: United States

Specifications

The Frangible Grenade M1 was a specially designed factory produced Molotov cocktail created by the United States in 1942 as it entered World War II (1939–1945). It was designed to provide lightly armed personnel (self-defense militias, soldiers, commandos, and Allied partisans) with simple, uncomplicated weapons that were easy to mass-produce. It provided a cheap stopgap means of knocking out enemy vehicles, clearing out strongpoints, and harassing or killing enemy personnel until more effective weapons could be produced and distributed. It was dubbed "frangible" because it was made from glass, which is brittle and easily broken.

== History ==
In late December 1941 the United States entered into World War II with an unprepared military, low stocks of arms and munitions, and fears of attack or invasion by the Axis Powers. To counter this looming threat, a series of Molotov cocktail-style devices, nominally designated as "grenades", were developed in early 1942. It consisted of a pint-sized brown or clear glass bottle that was sealed with a crimped metal cap (like a beer or soda bottle). It had a number of fillers it could contain, each with their own properties, but they were compounds selected because they were activated by exposure to the air. In September 1942 the United States standardized them as the Frangible Grenade M1 series. The grenades were designated by the Chemical Corps code letters for the chemical payload.

=== Incendiary ===
The most common were the incendiary models (in order of production):

- AW (1942–1943): Phosphorus mixed with a solution of rubber dissolved in gasoline. The phosphorus ignites when exposed, setting off the gasoline - it also burns on its own but cannot be put out with water. The dissolved rubber allows the gasoline to adhere to surfaces while burning. It was discontinued because it used rubber, a strategic material, as part of its filler.

The later models (for safety and reliability reasons) needed to have a detonator fuze assembly attached.

- Alcohol-Gasoline (1942–1944): A mixture of alcohol and gasoline. It used an M1 Igniter fuze, which injected a chemical powder that would ignite the mixture.
- GA (1942–1944): Liquid or thickened gasoline. It was set off with an M2 Igniter fuze, which used a pull-fuze to ignite a black powder fuze train to delay the ignition.
- IM (1943–1944): A mixture of gasoline and an incendiary compound thickener. It was ignited with an M3 fuze attached to the bottle with a Timmerman strap safety. The M3 Igniter fuze assembly consisted of a fuze body, a striker, and a .38-caliber Blank cartridge. The Timmerman Strap was a metal band under tension around the surface of the grenade that was hooked up to a striker safety in the fuze body. (If the bottle broke prematurely, the Timmerman strap safety would prevent the striker from going off on impact.) The user pulled the safety pin from the fuze assembly and threw the bottle against the target. When the bottle broke, the Timmerman strap fell off, deactivating the strap safety and allowing the striker to engage. The fuze spring in the fuze body activated the striker, which struck the cartridge. The blank cartridge set off a flash, which ignited the liquid filler.
- NP (1943–1944): A mixture of gasoline and naphtha-palmate thickener. It was ignited with an M3 fuze with a Timmerman strap safety (see IM above for details).

=== Chemical ===
The chemical grenades were extremely brutal. Even the smoke and tear-gas grenades had deliberate side-effects that would maim enemy personnel exposed to them. (Listed in alphabetical order).

- AC (1942–1944): Hydrocyanic acid, a clear liquid that vaporizes into a blood agent gas upon exposure. Symptoms are: dizziness, headache and a rush of blood to the head. Effects are: an inability for blood to release stored oxygen molecules to the body, resulting in death.
- CNS (1942–1943): Chloroacetophenone solution, a liquid that is a mixture of CN Gas (chloroacetophenone) dissolved in chloropicrin or chloroform. It becomes a potent lachrymator ("Tear gas") when it vaporizes into a gas upon exposure.
- FS (1942–1944): Sulfur trioxide and chlorosulfuric acid, a corrosive chemical mix that creates a heavy smoke when exposed. The main purpose was to act as screening smoke. It could also be used as a harassing or casualty agent if it was thrown inside an enclosed vehicle or structure, filling it with acrid, toxic smoke.
- M1 (1942–1943): B Chlorvinyldichlorarsine (or "Lewisite"), a dark brown liquid that turns into a colorless gas that smells like geraniums upon exposure. It is a powerful vesicant, chemically burning the surfaces of exposed skin and lungs. It also contaminates the effect area, requiring it to be decontaminated before it can be safely used.

=== Storage and shipping ===
The grenades were packed in cheap cardboard boxes filled with sawdust that were marked with the proper chemical warning stickers to alert personnel handling, loading, and transporting them. Field Manual FM 23-30-1944 lists the available types in 1944 as (AC), (FS), (IM), and (NP).
