= Anthropoid (film) =

2016 war film by Sean Ellis

- Theatrical release poster
- Directed by: Sean Ellis
- Written by: Sean Ellis; Anthony Frewin
- Produced by: Sean Ellis; Mickey Liddell; Pete Shilaimon
- Starring: Cillian Murphy; Jamie Dornan; Charlotte Le Bon; Anna Geislerová; Harry Lloyd; Toby Jones; Marcin Dorocinski
- Cinematography: Sean Ellis
- Edited by: Richard Mettler
- Music by: Guy Farley; Robin Foster
- Production companies: LD Entertainment; 22h22 Lucky Man Films; Silver A
- Distributed by: Falcon (Czech Republic); Icon Film Distribution (United Kingdom and Ireland)
- Release dates: 1 July 2016 (Karlovy Vary); 9 September 2016 (United Kingdom)
- Running time: 120 minutes
- Countries: Czech Republic; United Kingdom; France
- Languages: English; Czech
- Budget: $9 million
- Box office: $5.3 million

Anthropoid is a 2016 war film directed by Sean Ellis and starring Cillian Murphy, Jamie Dornan, Charlotte Le Bon, Anna Geislerová, Harry Lloyd, Toby Jones and Marcin Dorocinski, It was written by Ellis and Anthony Frewin. It depicts Operation Anthropoid, the assassination of Reinhard Heydrich by exiled Czechoslovak soldiers Jozef Gabčík and Jan Kubiš in World War II. It was released on 12 August 2016 in the United States and 9 September 2016 in the United Kingdom.

== Plot ==
In December 1941, German occupation in Europe has neared its height. Two agents from the Czechoslovak exile government, a Slovak soldier, Jozef Gabčík and a Czech, Jan Kubiš are parachuted into their occupied country. Jozef is injured when he crashes through a tree upon landing, but both men set out to find their contact in the resistance movement. They are discovered shortly afterwards by fake resistance fighters who turn out to be traitors; one is shot by Jozef but the other man escapes. Stealing their truck, the agents head for Prague.

When they seek out their contact, they are directed to Dr. Eduard, a veterinary surgeon who stitches Jozef's injuries. Eduard informs them their contact was arrested by the Gestapo and arranges for them to meet other resistance members, led by "Uncle" Jan Zelenka-Hajský and Ladislav Vaněk. Gabčík and Kubiš reveal that they are under orders to carry out Operation Anthropoid, the assassination of Reinhard Heydrich, the main architect of the Final Solution, and the Reichsprotektor of German–occupied Bohemia and Moravia.

With limited sources of intelligence and equipment, Jozef and Jan must find a way to assassinate Heydrich, an operation which they hope will incite further Czech resistance against the occupation. With the help of two young women, Marie Kovárníková and Lenka Fafková, along with other plotters, the agents plan to ambush Heydrich along the route to his headquarters at Prague Castle. When the agents learn that Heydrich is about to be transferred to Paris, the plan goes into effect straightaway with the duo bolstered by the addition of other agents who have been parachuted into Czechoslovakia and the remaining resistance fighters in Prague.

On 27 May 1942, the assassination attempt is carried out; Jozef's Sten sub-machine gun jams, but Jan throws a makeshift grenade which detonates under Heydrich's limousine, seriously wounding him before Jan and Jozef flee the scene. Schutzstaffel (SS) security forces round up thousands of Czech citizens and carry out reprisals, during which Lenka is killed trying to escape. Heydrich dies from his injuries a few days later.

Reprisals continue with the Lidice massacre, its male population over the age of 16 summarily murdered, and the women and children sent to concentration camps. Fearing that his family may fall victim to the reprisals, Resistance fighter Karel Čurda contacts Karl Hermann Frank, Heydrich's replacement as Reichsprotektor and betrays the others for amnesty and the reward. The Moravec family who had sheltered Jozef and Jan while they planned the attack are arrested by the Gestapo. Marie Moravec commits suicide with a cyanide pill, but her son, Ata Moravec, is tortured by the Gestapo until he reveals Jozef and Jan's hiding place in a concealed basement of the Saints Cyril and Methodius Cathedral in Prague. Hundreds of troops storm the cathedral where the Resistance agents are hiding. Jan, Adolf Opálka and Josef Bublik engage in a fierce last stand, killing many German soldiers before they are overwhelmed and are killed or commit suicide. The SS try to break into the crypt, where Josef Valčík, Jaroslav Švarc, Jan Hrubý and Jozef commit suicide to avoid capture. Before Jozef kills himself, he is comforted by a vision of Lenka reaching her hand out to him.

== Cast ==
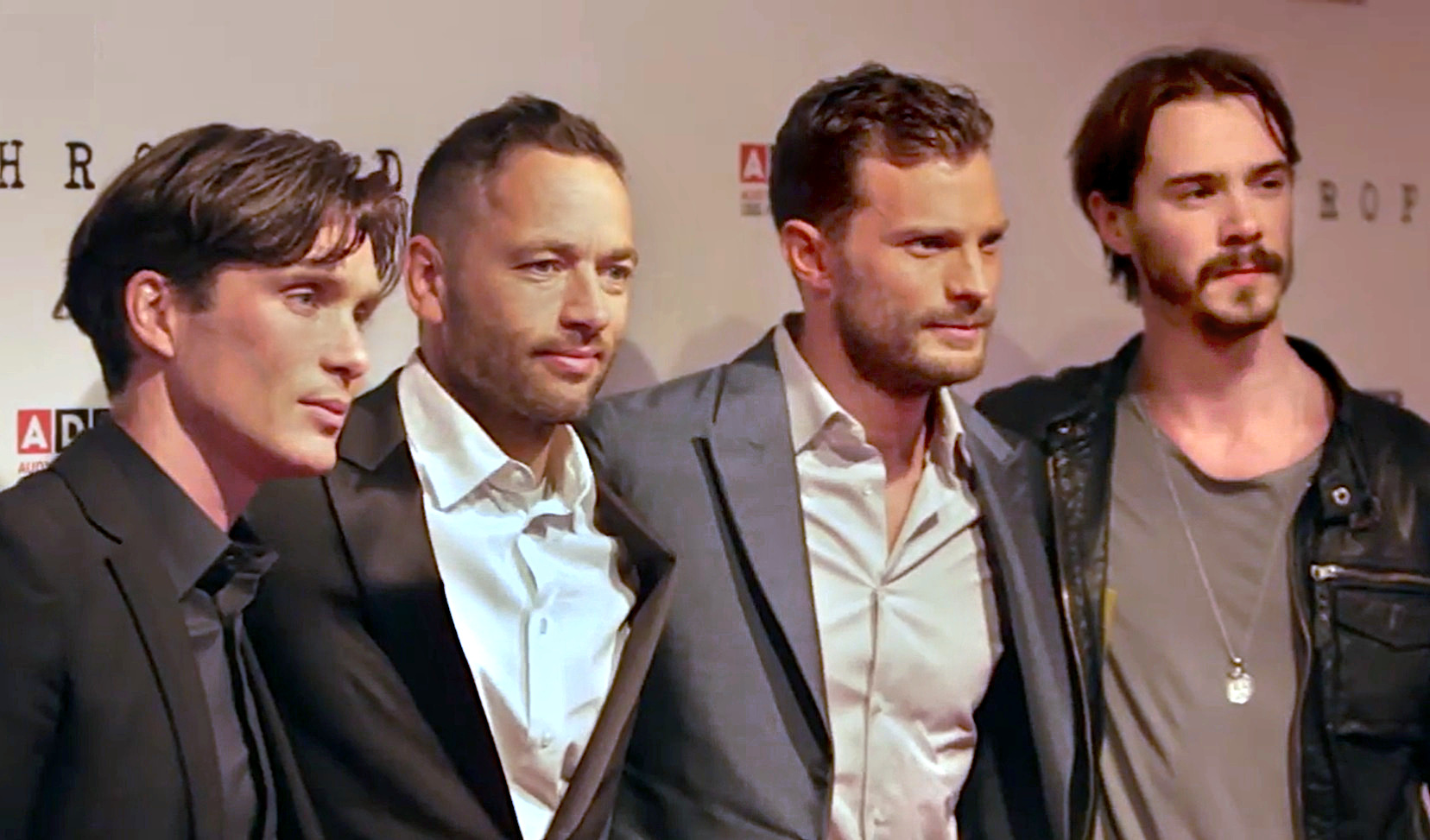
Anthropoid cast members Cillian Murphy, Sean Ellis (director), Jamie Dornan, and Sam Keeley at ADIFF 2016

- Cillian Murphy as Jozef Gabčík
- Jamie Dornan as Jan Kubiš
- Charlotte Le Bon as Marie Kovárníková
- Anna Geislerová as Lenka Fafková
- Harry Lloyd as Adolf Opálka
- Toby Jones as Uncle Hajský
- Alena Mihulová as Mrs. Moravec
- Marcin Dorociński as Ladislav Vaněk
- Bill Milner as Ata Moravec
- Sam Keeley as Josef Bublík
- Jiří Šimek as Karel Čurda
- Mish Boyko as Jan Hrubý
- Václav Neužil as Josef Valcik
- Andrej Polák as Jaroslav Svarc
- Sean Mahon as Dr. Eduard
- Detlef Bothe as Reinhard Heydrich

== Production ==
In March 2015, Jamie Dornan and Cillian Murphy were cast in Anthropoid, with Sean Ellis directing a screenplay written by Ellis and Anthony Frewin. In May 2015, LD Entertainment boarded the film, announcing the casting of Charlotte Le Bon.

The film was shot entirely in Prague during the summer of 2015, and where possible, at the actual locations of the events they depict. Director Sean Ellis stated in interview that scenes in the Orthodox Cathedral of Saints Cyril and Methodius were filmed on an exact replica of the church on a studio backlot, so as to make the location recognisable to Czech viewers. Gestapo and Czech contemporary reports allowed Ellis to recreate the film's final act (the assassination and church siege) with extreme accuracy, and intense planning was necessary to allow for the assassination itself to play in real time, with each resistance member's movements researched, planned and tracked in order to reflect actual events.

The principal photography for Anthropoid includes backdrops such as Prague Castle and the Charles Bridge in Prague, the locations where Operation Anthropoid took place. At the premiere screening and later advance screenings, audience members noted that the authentic street scenes were featured in the film.

== Release ==
In July 2015, the first image of Dornan and Murphy was released. In May 2016, Bleecker Street acquired U.S. distribution rights to the film. In June 2016, the first trailer was released.

Anthropoid had its world premiere at the Karlovy Vary International Film Festival on 1 July 2016 as the opening night film. It was released in the United States on 12 August 2016.

== Reception ==
=== Critical response ===
On review aggregation website Rotten Tomatoes, Anthropoid has an approval rating of 67% based on 105 reviews, with an average rating of 6.4/10. The website's critics consensus reads, "Anthropoid completes its mission rather unevenly but delivers a historically illuminating story with great performances to back it up." On Metacritic, the film has a weighted average score of 59 out of 100, based on 29 critics, indicating "mixed or average reviews". The film has garnered praise for its commitment to realism and true events.

In his review for The Guardian, Peter Bradshaw wrote, "An intelligent, tough, and gripping movie." Variety's chief film critic Peter Debruge felt that "Jamie Dornan and Cillian Murphy spearhead a mission to assassinate a top-ranking Nazi officer in a thriller that doesn't actually get thrilling until after the deed is done." The Washington Post's Christopher Kompanek gave the film four out of four stars, writing: "Anthropoid never feels formulaic—a surprise in a summer release. (With luck, Academy Award voters won't forget this one.)"

=== Accolades ===
At the Czech Lion Awards, Anthropoid received 12 nominations, out of 14 categories in which it was eligible (all except best actress and best supporting actress). The film lost all 12 nominations to A Prominent Patient. Anthropoid won the non-statutory Czech Lion in the "Film Fans Award" category.

== See also ==
- Dramatic portrayals of Reinhard Heydrich

Other films on this subject:

- Hangmen Also Die! (1943)
- Hitler's Madman (1943)
- The Silent Village (1943)
- Atentát (1964)
- Operation Daybreak (1975)
- Lidice (2011)
- The Man with the Iron Heart (2017)
