= The Man with the Iron Heart (film) =

- Theatrical release poster
- Directed by: Cédric Jimenez
- Screenplay by: David Farr; Audrey Diwan; Cédric Jimenez
- Based on: HHhH by Laurent Binet
- Produced by: Benjamin Drouin; Alain Goldman; Simon Istolainen
- Starring: Jason Clarke; Rosamund Pike; Jack O'Connell; Jack Reynor; Mia Wasikowska; Stephen Graham; Thomas M. Wright
- Cinematography: Laurent Tangy
- Music by: Guillaume Roussel
- Production companies: Légende Films; The Weinstein Company; FilmNation Entertainment; Echo Lake Entertainment
- Distributed by: Mars Films (France)
- Release date: 7 June 2017 (France)
- Running time: 120 minutes
- Countries: France; Belgium
- Language: English
- Budget: $32 million
- Box office: $4.4 million

The Man with the Iron Heart (released as HHhH in France and Killing Heydrich in Canada) is a 2017 biographical action-thriller film directed by Cédric Jimenez and written by David Farr, Audrey Diwan, and Jimenez. An English-language French-Belgian production, it is based on French writer Laurent Binet's 2010 novel HHhH, and focuses on Operation Anthropoid, the assassination of the Nazi leader Reinhard Heydrich in Prague during World War II.

The film stars Jason Clarke, Rosamund Pike, Jack O'Connell, Jack Reynor, and Mia Wasikowska. It was shot in Prague and Budapest from September 2015 until February 2016.

== Plot ==
Reinhard Heydrich is serving as an officer in the German Navy. After beginning a relationship with Lina, he is court-martialled for breaking his word to another woman he had been having sex with. He marries Lina and follows her in joining the Nazi Party and idolising Adolf Hitler. He meets Heinrich Himmler and is appointed head of SS counter-intelligence, working with Heinrich Müller to fight Communists in Weimar Germany. After Hitler is appointed Chancellor, Heydrich becomes Chief of the Gestapo.

After the German Invasion of Poland and World War II breaks out, Heydrich is promoted to Chief of the Reich Security Main Office. His Einsatzgruppen mobile death squads follow the German Army, committing genocide across Eastern Europe. He blackmails General Eduard Wagner into sending the Einzsatzgruppen information to allow them to exterminate Jews and other Untermenschen. In September 1941, Heydrich is appointed Acting Reich Protector of the Protectorate of Bohemia and Moravia, declaring that he will turn Prague into a "Jew-free" city. On 22 January 1942, Heydrich chairs the Wannsee Conference, to ensure there is a "Final Solution" for the genocide of Jews. In May 1942, Heydrich is attacked by Czech resistance fighters and dies of his wounds several days later.

== Cast ==
- Jason Clarke as SS-Obergruppenführer Reinhard Heydrich
- Rosamund Pike as Lina Heydrich
- Stephen Graham as Reichsführer-SS Heinrich Himmler
- Jack O'Connell as Jan Kubiš
- Jack Reynor as Jozef Gabčík
- Mia Wasikowska as Anna Novak
- Gilles Lellouche as Václav Morávek
- Tom Wright as Josef Valčík
- Enzo Cilenti as Adolf Opálka
- Adam Nagaitis as Karel Čurda
- Geoff Bell as SS-Gruppenführer Heinrich Müller
- Volker Bruch as SS-Obersturmbannführer Walter Schellenberg
- Barry Atsma as SS-Gruppenführer Karl Hermann Frank
- Noah Jupe as Vlastimil "Aťa" Moravec
- David Rintoul as General der Artillerie Eduard Wagner
- Vernon Dobtcheff as Emil Hácha
- Ian Redford as SA-Stabschef Ernst Röhm
- David Horovich as Vizeadmiral Gottfried Hansen
- Oscar Kennedy as Jan Milíč Zelenka

== Production ==
The film is based on Laurent Binet's novel HHhH about Operation Anthropoid, the assassination of Nazi leader Reinhard Heydrich in Prague. The title is an acronym for Himmlers Hirn heißt Heydrich ("Himmler's brain is called Heydrich"), a quip about Heydrich said to have circulated in Nazi Germany. Cédric Jimenez directed the film based on the script he co-wrote with David Farr and Audrey Diwan, which was financed by Légende Films, Adama Pictures, Echo Lake Entertainment and FilmNation Entertainment. Alain Goldman and Simon Istolainen produced the film. Principal photography on the film began on 14 September 2015 in Prague and Budapest, and concluded on 1 February 2016. In October 2015, the Weinstein Company acquired U.S. distribution rights to the film. While never theatrically released in the United States due to the company's bankruptcy in 2018, the film was made available on digital media on January 28, 2025 by Paramount Pictures and TWC's successor-in-interest Spyglass Media Group.

== Reception ==
On Rotten Tomatoes, the film holds an approval rating of 67% based on 9 reviews, with an average rating of 5.83/10.

Boyd van Hoeij of The Hollywood Reporter wrote: "Finally less a two-stories-for-the-price-of-one situation than essentially two films of about an hour each, this is nonetheless a visually impressive Hollywood calling card for Jimenez, who almost manages to overcome the material’s structural weaknesses with impressive directorial verve."

== See also ==
- Operation Anthropoid
- Hangmen Also Die! (1943)
- Hitler's Madman (1943)
- The Silent Village (1943)
- Atentát (1964)
- Operation Daybreak (1975)
- Conspiracy (2001)
- Lidice (2011)
- Anthropoid (2016)
