= Curda =

Curda is the name of:

- Piper Curda (born 1997), an American actress and singer
- Karel Čurda (1911 – 1947), a Czech World War II soldier
