= Opalka =

Opalka is a surname. Notable people with the surname include:

- Adolf Opálka (1915–1942), Czechoslovak soldier during the World War II
- Roman Opałka (1931–2011), French-born Polish painter
