= Ořechov (Jihlava District) =

- Municipality
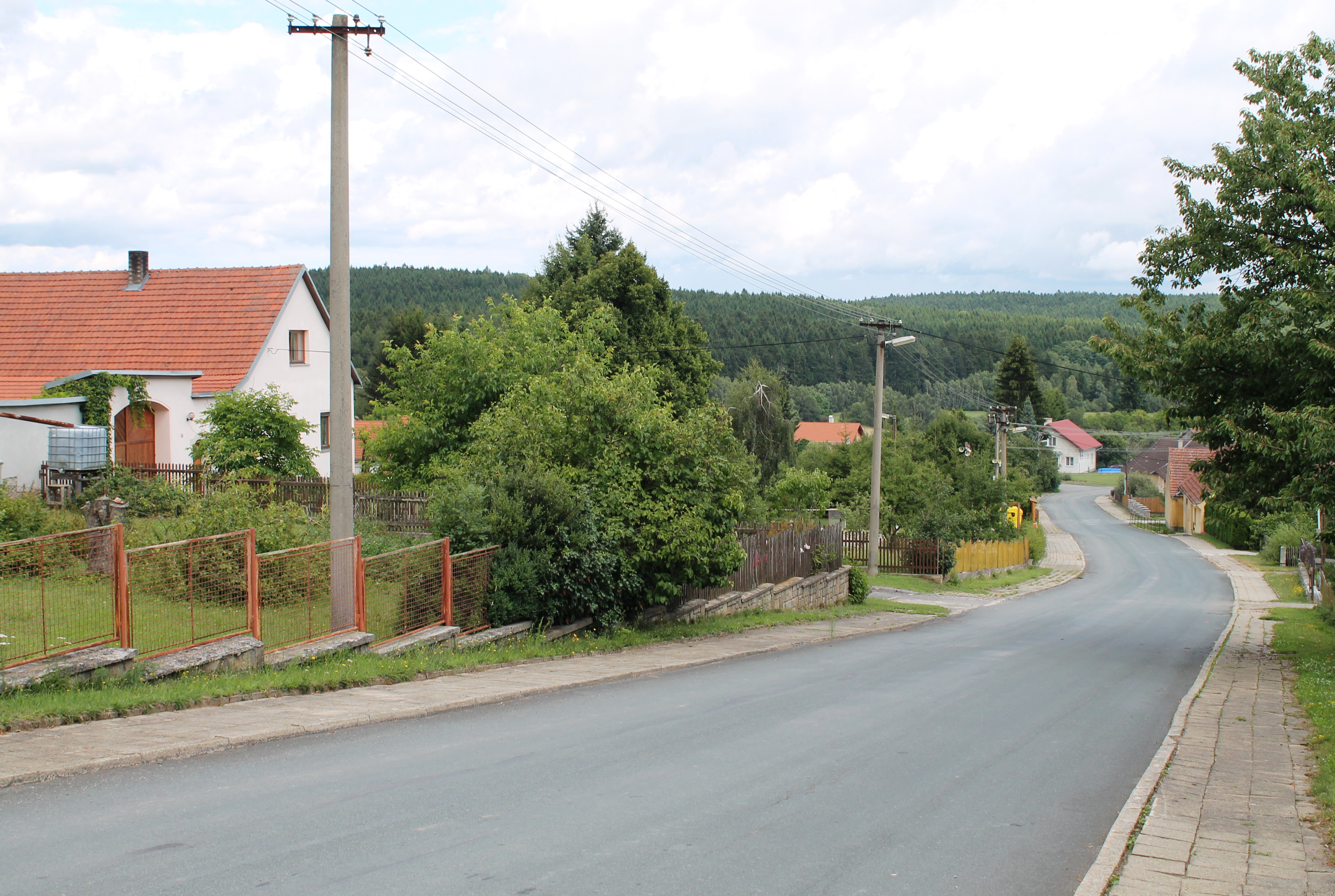
- Centre of Ořechov

- Location in the Czech Republic
- Coordinates: 49°12′0″N 15°31′55″E
- Country: Czech Republic
- Region: Vysočina
- District: Jihlava
- First mentioned: 1355

Area
  - Total: 2.90 km^{2} (1.12 sq mi)
- Elevation: 635 m (2,083 ft)

Population (2026-01-01)
  - Total: 76
  - Density: 26/km^{2} (68/sq mi)
- Time zone: UTC+1 (CET)
  - Summer (DST): UTC+2 (CEST)
- Postal code: 588 62
- Website: www.orechovutelce.cz

Ořechov (Czech pronunciation: [ˈor̝ɛxof]) is a municipality and village in Jihlava District in the Vysočina Region of the Czech Republic. It has about 80 inhabitants.

== Etymology ==
The name is derived from the Czech word ořeší ('nut bushes') and refers to the abundant occurrence of common hazel in the vicinity of the village.

== Geography ==
Ořechov is located about 22 kilometres (14 mi) south of Jihlava. It lies in the Křižanov Highlands. The highest point is at 667 m (2,188 ft) above sea level. The Řečice Stream flows along the eastern municipal border.

== History ==
The first written mention of Ořechov is from 1355. From 1420 until the establishment of an independent municipality in 1850, Ořechov was part of the Telč estate and shared its owners.

Ořechov was the place where a group of parachutists landed in 1942 during the Out Distance operation.

== Demographics ==
Historical population

Year	Pop.	±%
1869	113	—
1880	133	+17.7%
1890	114	−14.3%
1900	117	+2.6%
1910	120	+2.6%

Year	Pop.	±%
1921	115	−4.2%
1930	117	+1.7%
1950	112	−4.3%
1961	108	−3.6%
1970	97	−10.2%

Year	Pop.	±%
1980	84	−13.4%
1991	72	−14.3%
2001	74	+2.8%
2011	68	−8.1%
2021	66	−2.9%

Source: Censuses

== Transport ==
The I/23 road from Třebíč to Jindřichův Hradec runs through the municipality.

== Sights ==
The only protected cultural monument in the municipality is a column shrine from the 18th century.
