= Adolf Opálka =

Czech soldier and resistance fighter (1915–1942)

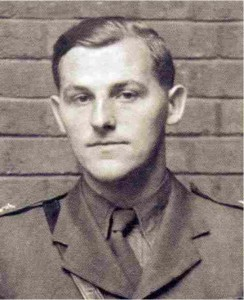
- Born: 4 January 1915; Rešice, Moravia, Austria-Hungary
- Died: 18 June 1942 (aged 27); Prague, Protectorate of Bohemia and Moravia
- Military career
- Allegiance: Czechoslovakia; France; United Kingdom
- Branch: Czechoslovak Army; French Army; British Army
- Service years: 1936–1942
- Rank: First lieutenant
- Unit: Special Operations Executive
- Commands: Out Distance
- Conflicts: World War II; Battle of France; Operation Anthropoid
- Awards: See awards

First Lieutenant Adolf Opálka (4 January 1915 – 18 June 1942) was a Czech army officer. He was a member of the Czech sabotage group Out Distance (a World War II anti-Nazi resistance group) and a participant in Operation Anthropoid, the successful mission to kill Reinhard Heydrich.

Opálka joined the Czechoslovak Army in 1936 where he served in the 43rd Infantry Regiment in Brno. The Munich Agreement and subsequent German occupation of Czechoslovakia led to the disbanding of the Czechoslovak Army, and Opálka's career ended. He escaped to North Africa where he served in the French Foreign Legion, and he later returned to France. He then joined the Out Distance group and participated in Operation Anthropoid. Several days later he was found by the Nazis, along with other Anthropoid agents, in the Cathedral of Saints Cyril and Methodius (Prague) and, after a gunfight in which he was injured, took his own life to avoid capture.

== Early life ==
Opálka was born in Rešice in Moravia, Austria-Hungary (now the Czech Republic), the illegitimate son of miller Viktor Jarolím (1889–1942) of Tulešice and Anežka Opálková. When his mother died in 1923, Opálka lived with his aunt Marie Opálková (1882–1942).

Between 1932 and 1936, Opálka studied at the Commercial Academy and, shortly after his graduation in 1936, he joined the army of Czechoslovakia. After recruitment and training, he was assigned to the 43rd Infantry Regiment in Brno and shortly afterwards attended the Army Academy in Hranice. After graduation, Opálka joined the 2nd Mountain Regiment in Ružomberok as a lieutenant.

The Munich Agreement ended Opálka's army career in his homeland, and he left Czechoslovakia with his cousin František Pospíšil. First travelling through Poland and France, they fled to North Africa, where they joined the French Foreign Legion. Opálka served in Sidi Bel Abbes as a sergeant of the 1st Infantry Regiment. Later, he joined Senegal's gunmen in Oran.

Opálka's fiancée spoke about this period of his life:

Shortly before he left he burned all our correspondence, I did the same on his request. In the morning before he left, I photographed him for the last time. The picture is unhappy just like the departure itself, because we didn't know what he was putting himself into…

== World War II ==
After the start of World War II and the occupation of Czechoslovakia, Opálka returned to France from Africa and joined a developing Czechoslovak army in Agde, serving as leader of an infantry platoon of the 2nd Infantry Regiment of the 1st Czechoslovak Infantry Division. In January 1940, he was transferred to the 3rd Infantry Division and commanded the 5th Infantry Battalion.

On 12 July 1940, when France was defeated, Opálka sailed on the troopship SS Neuralia to the United Kingdom and as an unfiled officer served in a machine gun platoon. In the summer of 1941, he volunteered as a soldier for covert operations behind enemy lines. He had been trained in Scotland in Special Training Schools. Afterwards, he became leader of the group codenamed "Out Distance".

=== Out Distance ===
Opálka (cover name "Adolf Král"), Ivan Kolařík ("Jan Krátký"), and Karel Čurda ("Karel Vrbas") secretly parachuted into the Protectorate of Bohemia and Moravia on 28 March 1942 to perform covert operations including bomber navigation and sabotage. The operations of Out Distance were complicated from the beginning. A navigational mistake by the Handley Page Halifax plane bringing them in caused the entire group to be dropped at the wrong location. This, together with the loss of equipment, led to the splitting up of the group. Opálka contacted captain Alfréd Bartoš from the group Silver-A and informed him of the situation. He later joined the group gathered around Operation Anthropoid in Prague and became leader of the Prague parachuters.

=== Operation Anthropoid ===
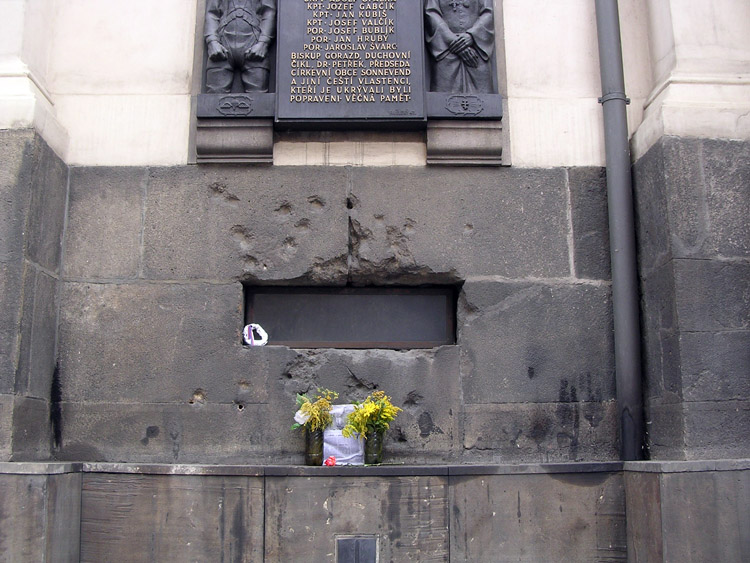
Crypt of the Cathedral of Saints Cyril and Methodius, Prague

Operation Anthropoid involved a plot to kill Reinhard Heydrich, the Reichsprotektor of wartime Bohemia and Moravia with a modified anti-tank grenade. After the mission was carried out, Opálka and his six fellow combatants (Josef Bublík, Jozef Gabčík, Jan Hrubý, Jan Kubiš, Josef Valčík, and Jaroslav Švarc) were tracked to the Church of St. Cyril and St. Methodius in Prague. At 16:15 on 18 June 1942, the church was besieged by 800 soldiers of the German army and Waffen-SS. After a seven-hour fight, the outnumbered group of paratroopers fell. All died, including First Lieutenant Adolf Opálka who, injured by shrapnel, committed suicide. He is buried at the Ďáblice Cemetery in Prague.

Shortly after his departure, on his 27th birthday, Opálka wrote of homesickness:

I'm 27 years old today, the entire trip I pondered upon the words "Longing for home is a terrible thing, I know". Yes, only now do I know and understand. And this "homesickness" of Božena Němcová, which I never understood, is nothing compared to my longing for home. I'm willing to suffer through, and do whatever it takes, but only home and home and to honestly work, work for something... How can some speak of beauty, when they've never seen Rešice and the fields from Kordula to Rešice, who never strolled through the warm dirt there, who never felt the warm air and over the grain fields, who never saw our chapel in the milk of white cherries, Husák's garden, which always reminded me of Sholokhov, especially the dirt lumps under the "vortex" and the "Bare Hill" and all the other places on all of which I am. Parts of me are all over the world. In England, little was left of me, maybe more in Scotland... 27 years of life behind me. Death for my homeland. With that I have dealt, and am ready to do what it takes.

After the mission of the paratroopers, the Nazis unleashed strong reprisals. Opálka's aunt, Marie Opálková, was executed in Mauthausen on 24 October 1942. His father, Viktor Jarolím, was also killed.

== Honours and decorations ==
- Czechoslovak War Cross, 1939, 1942, and 1945
- King's Commendation, posthumously, 1947
- Gold Medal of the Czechoslovak Military Order for Liberty, 1949
- First Class Star of Czechoslovak Army Order of the White Lion for Victory, posthumously, 1968
- Milan Rastislav Štefánik Order, Third Class, posthumously, 1991
- Promoted to colonel, posthumously, 2002
