= Josef Valčík =

Czech army officer and resistance fighter

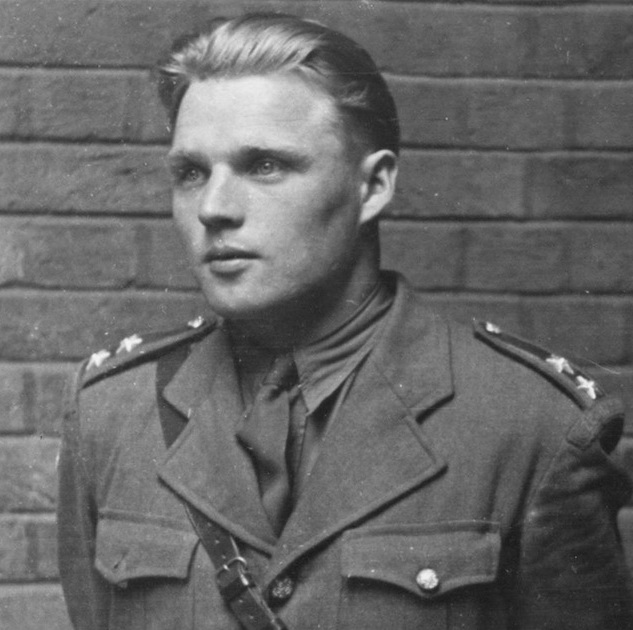
- Born: 2 November 1914; Smolina, Moravia, Austria-Hungary
- Died: 18 June 1942 (aged 27); Saints Cyril and Methodius Cathedral, Prague, Protectorate of Bohemia and Moravia
- Burial place: Ďáblice Cemetery, Prague
- Military career
- Allegiance: Czechoslovakia; United Kingdom
- Branch: Czechoslovak Army; Czechoslovak Army in-exile
- Service years: 1936–1939, 1940–1942
- Rank: Podporučík (Lieutenant)
- Unit: Special Operations Executive
- Conflicts: Second World War; Operation Anthropoid
- Awards: Czechoslovak War Cross 1939–1945

Josef Valčík (pronounced [ˈjozɛv ˈval̩tʃiːk]; 2 November 1914 – 18 June 1942) was a Czech army officer and member of the Resistance in German-occupied Czechoslovakia. He took part in the firefight during the aftermath of the assassination of Reinhard Heydrich by Jozef Gabčík and Jan Kubiš, code named Operation Anthropoid.

== Life ==
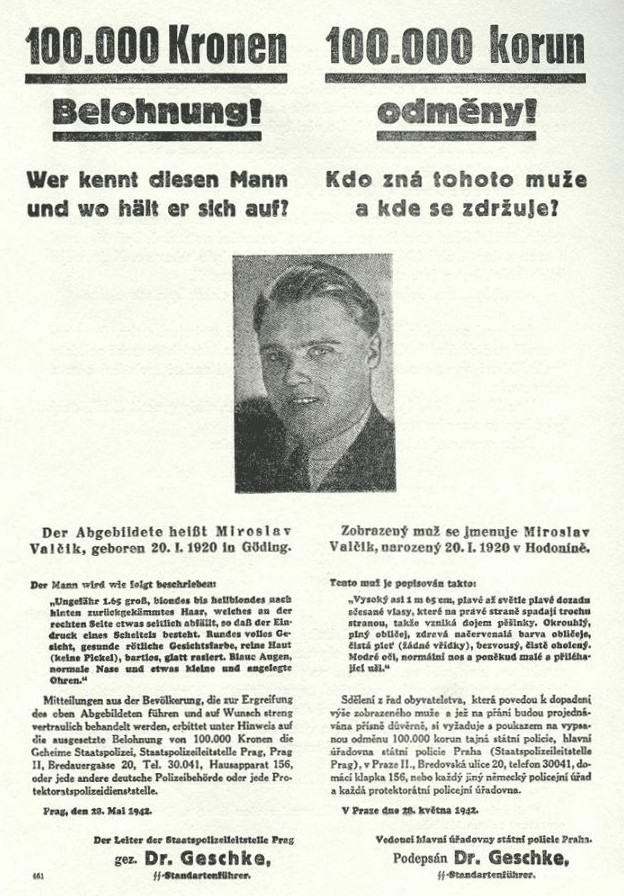
Josef Valčík wanted poster. He is misidentified as "Miroslav" Valčík, his place of birth is wrongly given as Hodonín/Göding, and the date of birth is erroneous as well.

Josef Valčík was born in the village of Smolina in Moravia, Austria-Hungary (now part of Valašské Klobouky, Czech Republic).

He is buried at the Ďáblice Cemetery in Prague.

== Operation Anthropoid ==
SS-Obergruppenführer Heydrich, a high-ranking German Nazi official, was chief of the Reich Security Main Office and one of the main architects of the Holocaust. He was also Stellvertretender Reichsprotektor of Bohemia and Moravia in 1942.

The Germans were unable to locate the attackers until Karel Čurda of the "Out Distance" sabotage group turned himself in to the Gestapo and gave them the names of the team's local contacts for the reward of one million Reichsmarks. Valčík and the others died after a six-hour firefight with Waffen-SS troops and German police in the Saints Cyril and Methodius Cathedral.

== Family ==
Fourteen members of Valčík's family were arrested, brought to Mauthausen concentration camp and executed.

- Parents Jan Valčík (1880–1942) and Veronika Valčík (1888–1942)
- Brother Antonín Valčík (1919–1942) and sister Ludmila Valčíková (1923–1942)
- Sister Terezia Beňová (1912–1942) with husband Jan Beňa (1908–1942)
- Sister Marie Kolaříková (1917–1942) with husband Josef Kolařík (1914–1942)
- Sister Františka Sívková (1911–1942) with husband František Sívek (1910–1942)
- Brother Alois Valčík (1908–1942) with wife Anna Valčíková (1907–1942)
- Brother Emil Valčík (1909–1942) with wife Anna Valčíková (1911–1942)

== Honours ==
- 1942 – – Czechoslovak War Cross 1939–1945
- 1942 – – Second Czechoslovak War Cross 1939–1945 in memoriam
- 1944 – – Commemorative Medal of the Czechoslovak Army Abroad with France and Great Britain Bars
- 1945 – – Third Czechoslovak War Cross 1939–1945 in memoriam
- 1949 – – Czechoslovak Military Order for Freedom, Gold Star
- 1968 – – Order of the Red Banner
- 2010 – – Cross of Merit of the State Defense
