= Jiří Šulc =

Czech writer

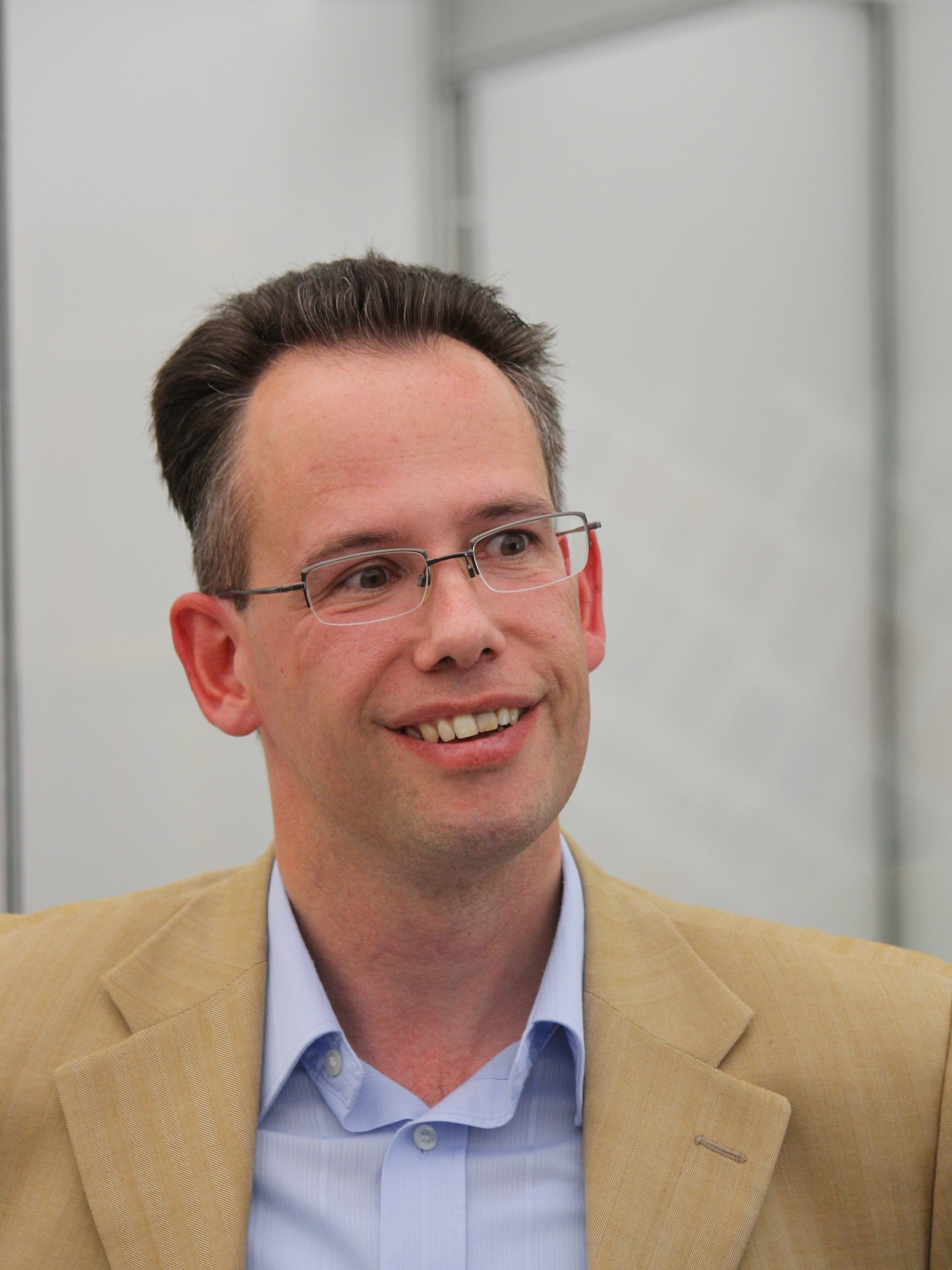
- Jiří Šulc in 2011
- Born: Jiří Šulc; 1969 (age 56–57)
- Education: Faculty of Law
- Alma mater: Charles University
- Writing career
- Language: Czech
- Period: 2000s–2010s
- Genre: novels
- Subject: World War II
- Notable work: Dva proti Říši
- Notable awards: Book Club Literary Prize (2007)

Jiří Šulc (born 1969) is a Czech writer.

After graduating from the Faculty of Law of Charles University in Prague, he worked for the Security Information Service for fifteen years. Later he worked for the European Commission in Brussels. He currently works at the European GNSS Agency in Prague.

He won the Book Club Literary Prize in 2007 for his literary debut written on the assassination of Reinhard Heydrich, the novel Dva proti Říši (literally Two Men Against the Empire).

He wrote his first two novels in English, translating them into Czech after not finding a publisher for them.

== Works ==
- Dva proti Říši (2007)
  - published in English as ebook Hunting the Predator in 2016
- Operace Bruneval (2008)
- Mosty do Tel-Avivu (2010)
- Operace Stonewall (2011)
- Zrádci (2012)
