= Jozef Gabčík =

Slovak soldier who took part in assassinating Reinhard Heydrich

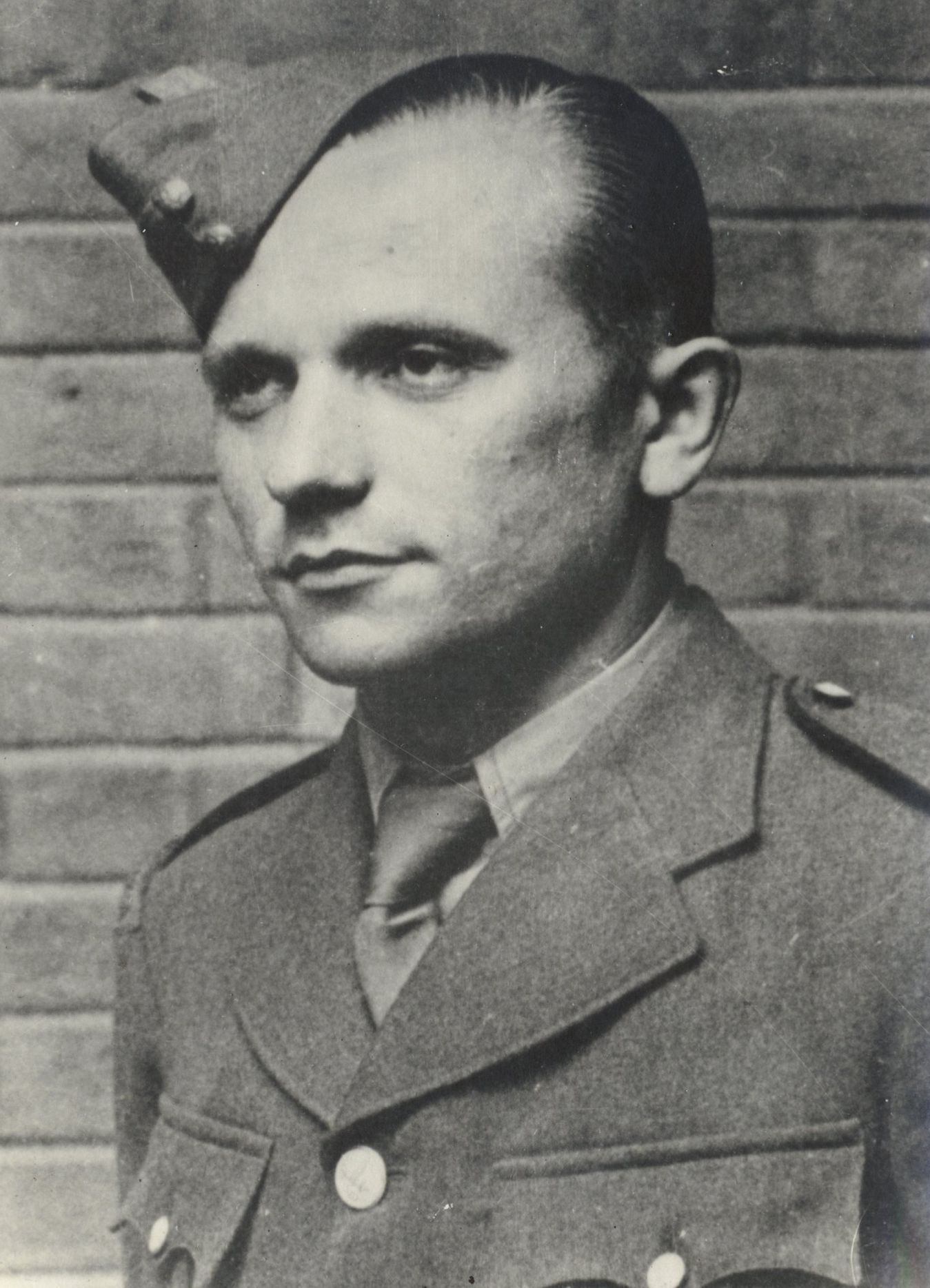
- Gabčík in 1941
- Born: 8 April 1912: Rajecké Teplice, Austria-Hungary
- Died: 18 June 1942 (aged 30); Saints Cyril and Methodius Cathedral, Prague, Protectorate of Bohemia and Moravia
- Burial place: Ďáblice cemetery
- Military career
- Allegiance: Czechoslovakia; Britain
- Branch: Czechoslovak Army; Czechoslovak government-in-exile
- Service years: 1939–1942
- Rank: Rittmeister Colonel.
- Unit: Special Operations Executive
- Conflicts: World War II; Battle of France; Operation Anthropoid
- Awards: Czechoslovak War Cross 1939–1945; Croix de Guerre

Jozef Gabčík (Slovak: [ˈjɔzev ˈɡaptʂiːk]; 8 April 1912 – 18 June 1942) was a Slovak soldier in the Czechoslovak Army involved in the Operation Anthropoid, the assassination of Reinhard Heydrich, the acting Reichsprotektor (Realm-Protector) of the Protectorate of Bohemia and Moravia, SS-Obergruppenführer.

== Life ==
=== Youth ===
Gabčík was born 1912 in Poluvsie, part of town Rajecké Teplice (Hungarian: Rajecfürdő), Trencsén County, Kingdom of Hungary (then part of Austria-Hungary, now in northwestern Slovakia). He learned to be a farrier, as well as a blacksmith. He was also taught clock making at the village of Kostelec nad Vltavou (in central Bohemia). He was taught by local master blacksmith J. Kunike. He lived with the Kunike family in their house of which still stands together with the outbuilding and yard which was used as a smithy. In 1927 the school records show that he attended school in business studies at village Kovářov near to Kostelec nad Vltavou. The building which housed the school is today the municipal office. (A marble plaque was erected in 2010, together with historical documents on the wall there – these documents were all placed there by the citizens of Kovářov.)

In 1937, he began work at a military chemical plant in Žilina; after an accident, however, he was transferred to the gas storage facility (which belonged to the Czechoslovak army) in Trenčín.

=== In exile ===
The breakup of the Czechoslovak Republic and the subsequent emergence (on 14 March 1939) of the clero-fascist and anti-Czech Slovak State he did not accept – when German Wehrmacht took over the military depot he sabotaged it. To escape punishment, he fled to Poland (on 6 June 1939) and joined forming Czechoslovak military unit in Polish service (Czechoslovak Legion). Then, with other comrades, was transferred via ship to France and there entered the 1st Regiment of the Foreign Legion. In 26 September 1939 he was drafted in Agde into the emerging Czechoslovak foreign army in France and included as deputy commander of the machine gun platoon at the 1st Infantry Regiment of the 1st Czechoslovak Infantry Division in France (1^{re} division d'infanterie tchécoslovaque en France). Three months later, he was promoted to the rank of četař (sergeant) and participated in the Battle of France during the spring of 1940.

Following France's surrender, together with remnants of Czechoslovak troops, he evacuated (12 July 1940) to Great Britain where he was trained as a paratrooper. He became a rotmistr (approx. UK staff sergeant) in rank. The Free Czechoslovaks, as he and other self-exiled Czechoslovaks were called, were stationed at Cholmondeley Castle near Malpas in Cheshire.

=== Assassination of Reinhard Heydrich ===
Jozef Gabčík and Jan Kubiš were airlifted along with seven soldiers from Czechoslovak army-in-exile in the United Kingdom and two other groups named Silver A and Silver B (who had different missions) by a Royal Air Force Halifax of No. 138 Squadron into Czechoslovakia at 10 pm on 28 December 1941. In Prague, they contacted several families and anti-Nazi organisations who helped them during the preparations for the assassination.

On 27 May 1942, at 10:30 am, Reinhard Heydrich proceeded on his daily commute from his home in Panenské Břežany to Prague Castle. Gabčík and Kubiš waited at the tram stop on the curve near Bulovka Hospital in Prague 8-Libeň. As Heydrich's open-topped Mercedes-Benz arrived, Gabčík, who concealed his Sten gun under a raincoat, dropped the raincoat and raised the gun to shoot Heydrich, but the gun jammed. Heydrich ordered his driver, SS-Oberscharführer Klein, to stop the car. As the car braked in front of him, Kubiš threw a modified anti-tank grenade (concealed in a briefcase) at the vehicle; it detonated under the car, seriously wounding Heydrich, its fragments ripping through the right rear fender and embedding shrapnel from the upholstery of the car into Heydrich, causing serious injuries to his left side, with major damage to his diaphragm, spleen and lung, as well as a fractured rib. Kubiš received a minor wound to his face from the shrapnel. Heydrich and Klein leapt out of the shattered car with drawn pistols; Klein ran towards Kubiš, who had staggered against the railings, while Heydrich went to Gabčík who stood, holding the Sten. Kubiš recovered and, jumped on his bicycle and pedalled away, scattering passengers spilling from the tram, by firing in the air with his Colt M1903 pistol. Klein tried to fire at him but dazed by the explosion, pressed the magazine release catch and the gun jammed. A staggering Heydrich came towards Gabčík, who dropped his Sten and tried to reach his bicycle. He was forced to abandon this attempt, however, and took cover behind a telegraph pole, firing at Heydrich with his pistol. Heydrich returned fire and ducked behind the stalled tram, when he suddenly doubled over and staggered to the side of the road in pain. He then collapsed against the railings, holding himself up with one hand. As Gabčík took the opportunity to run, Klein rushed to help his wounded superior. Heydrich, his face pale and contorted in pain, pointed toward the fleeing Gabčík, saying "Get that bastard!". As Klein gave pursuit, Heydrich stumbled along the pavement before collapsing against the bonnet of his car. Gabčík fled into a butcher shop, where the owner, a man named Brauer, who was a Nazi sympathiser and had a brother who worked for the Gestapo, ignored Gabčík's request for help, and ran out into the roadway, attracting Klein's attention by shouting and pointing. Klein, whose gun was still jammed, ran into the shop and collided with Gabčík in the doorway. In the confusion, Gabčík shot him twice, severely wounding him in the leg. Gabčík then escaped in a tram, reaching a local safe house. The assassins were initially convinced that the attack had failed. Heydrich was rushed to Bulovka Hospital, where he consequently developed a fatal case of blood poisoning. He died of his injuries on 4 June 1942.

=== Death ===
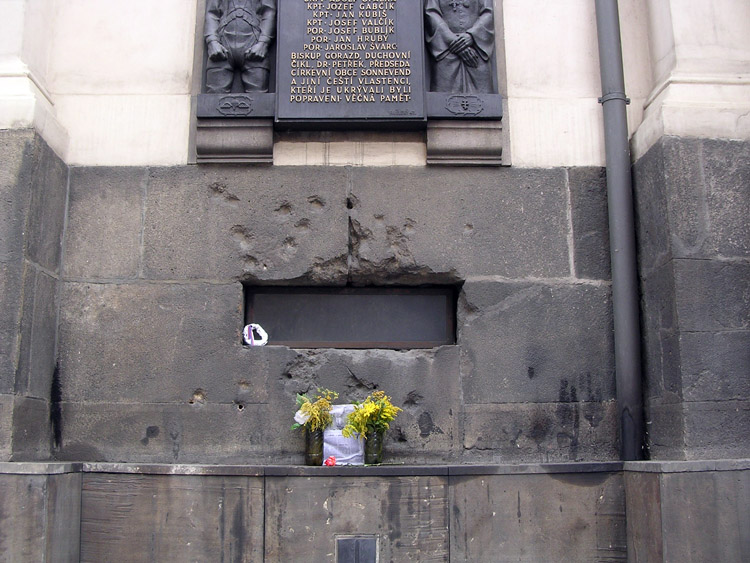
Bullet-scarred window of the Church of St. Cyril and St. Methodious in Prague where Gabčík and his compatriots were cornered

A rigorous investigation of the assassination determined that it was planned and executed by the Czech Resistance with the assistance of the British. The oppression and persecution of the defiant Czechs reached its peak following the failure of Nazi soldiers to capture the assassins alive. More than 13,000 people were ultimately arrested and tortured, including the girlfriend of Jan Kubiš, Anna Malinová, who died at Mauthausen-Gusen concentration camp. First Lieutenant Adolf Opálka's aunt, Marie Opálková, was executed in Mauthausen on 24 October 1942. His father, Viktor Jarolím, was also killed.

The Nazi officials in the Protectorate carried out an extensive search for the six men. Eventually, the Germans found them hiding in Cyril and Methodius Cathedral in Prague. After a six-hour gun battle, in which the Germans lost 14 men and sustained wounds to 21 others, Gabčík and the others, with the exception of Kubiš, who was seriously wounded by a grenade, committed suicide before the Nazis could take them alive in the church catacombs. Kubiš died of his wounds shortly after arrival at the hospital.

== Posthumous recognition ==
The town of Gabčíkovo in southern Slovakia is named after Gabčík, and one of the biggest dams on the Danube next to the village is named after the town. Jozef Gabčík's name was also given to the 5. pluk špeciálneho určenia ("5th special operations regiment of Jozef Gabčík") part of the Slovak Armed Forces, based in Žilina.

In May 2007, with the aim of commemorating the heroes of the Czech and Slovak Resistance, the Slovak National Museum opened an exhibition presenting one of the most important resistance actions in the whole Nazi-occupied Europe.

Coinciding with the release of the film Anthropoid (2016), campaigners called for Gabčík's and Kubiš's bodies to be exhumed from the mass grave at the Ďáblice Cemetery in northern Prague, and to be given a dignified burial fitting "the heroes of anti-Nazi resistance".

A memorial stone for Gabčík and Kubiš can be found in the grounds of St John the Baptist Church in Ightfield.

== Gabčík in film and fiction ==
Gabčík is portrayed by:

- Ladislav Mrkvička (1964) Atentát
- Anthony Andrews (1975) Operation Daybreak
- Cillian Murphy (2016) Anthropoid
- Jack Reynor (2017) The Man with the Iron Heart

Gabčík is a character in the historical novel "HHhH" by Laurent Binet (2009/English translation 2012).
