= Out Distance =

1942 WWII Czech anti-Nazi operation

Operation Out Distance
- Part of World War II
- Type: Military operation
- Location: Protectorate of Bohemia and Moravia
- Planned by: Czechoslovak Ministry of Defence in London
- Target: Gasworks in Prague
- Objective: Sabotage, delivering radio equipment and transmit by radio to London
- Date: 28 March 1942
- Executed by: Adolf Opálka, Karel Čurda and Ivan Kolařík

Operation Out Distance was a Czech resistance group active during World War II. It was dispatched by Special Group D of the Ministry of Defence of the Czechoslovak government in exile in London. The group operated in the Protectorate of Bohemia and Moravia, a region of occupied Czechoslovakia.

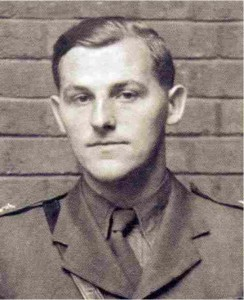
Adolf Opálka

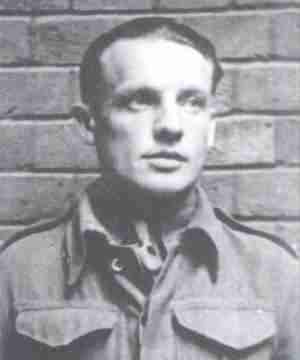
Karel Čurda, became a Nazi collaborator

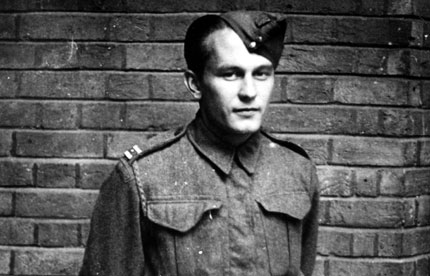
Ivan Kolařík

== Operations ==
At 2 AM on 28 March 1942, the group parachuted from a British Halifax aircraft which also carried the unsuccessful group Zink. Their objectives included sabotaging gasworks in Prague, delivering radio-sets to other resistance fighters, and guiding bombers to the Škoda Works in Plzeň.

Due to a navigation error they landed in Ořechov, not their intended destination, resulting in the loss of significant material and pursuit by the Gestapo. Consequently, the group members decided to split and operate independently. Ivan Kolařík, a member of the group, committed suicide on 1 April 1942, after losing his fake ID, in a desperate attempt to shield his family from reprisals following the compromise of his cover.

First Lieutenant Adolf Opálka and Karel Čurda travelled to Prague to join Operation Anthropoid, aimed at assassinating high ranking German SS official Reinhard Heydrich. Upon joining group Silver A, Opálka was tasked with commanding the parachute groups. The operation successfully eliminated Heydrich, but in the aftermath, as mass executions started during the second martial law, Čurda sought refuge with his mother in Nová Hlína. Unable to withstand the physical and emotional strain and seeking to protect his family, Čurda betrayed his military oath by providing the Gestapo with information after an announcement promising leniency for such intelligence. This led to the discovery of the assassins’ hideout at Prague's Ss. Cyril and Methodius Cathedral. A fierce battle ensued, resulting in the death or suicide of Opálka and other resistors. Čurda subsequently assisted the Gestapo in identifying the bodies of fellow parachutists, receiving a portion of the 10 million Reichsmark reward offered by the occupiers.

After the war, Karel Čurda was apprehended and brought before an extraordinary people's court, which found him guilty of treason. He was sentenced to death and subsequently executed by hanging at Pankrác Prison on 29 April 1947.
