= Assassination of Reinhard Heydrich =

1942 assassination in Prague

Coordinates: 50°7′4″N 14°27′51″E

Operation Anthropoid
- Part of the Occupation of Czechoslovakia (1938–1945) in World War II
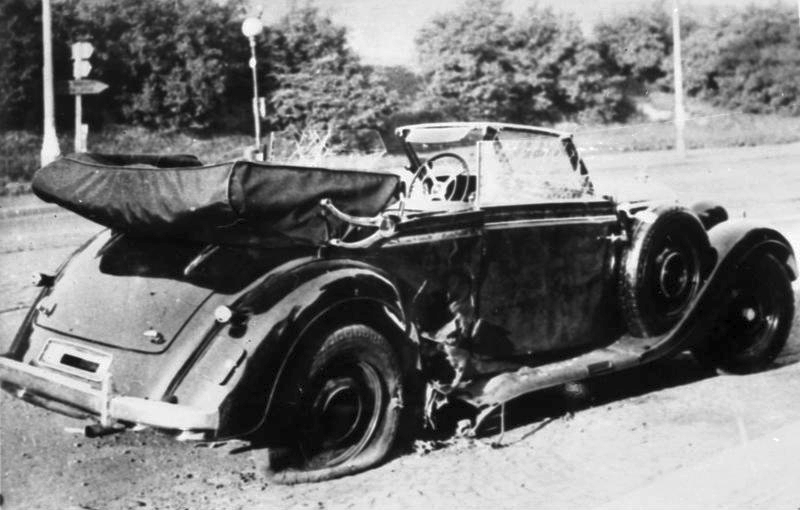
- Heydrich's Typ 320 damaged by the anti-tank grenade
- Type: Assassination
- Location: Prague, Protectorate of Bohemia and Moravia
- Planned: December 1941 – May 1942
- Planned by: Special Operations Executive, František Moravec
- Target: Reinhard Heydrich (DOW)
- Date: 27 May 1942; 84 years ago
- Executed by: Jozef Gabčík, Jan Kubiš
- Outcome: Heydrich succumbs to wounds on 4 June; Nazis order reprisals; Assassins killed in firefight at St Cyril and Methodius Cathedral; Bishop Gorazd and church priests arrested and executed; Estimated 13,000 arrested and interrogated; estimated 5,000 executed; Lidice and Ležáky destroyed; villagers executed or sent to concentration camps

Reinhard Heydrich, the commander of the German Reich Security Main Office (RSHA), the acting Reichsprotektor of the Protectorate of Bohemia and Moravia and a principal architect of the Holocaust, was attacked during the Second World War in a coordinated operation by the Czechoslovak resistance. The assassination attempt, code-named Operation Anthropoid, was carried out by resistance operatives Jozef Gabčík and Jan Kubiš on 27 May 1942. Heydrich was wounded in the attack and he died 8 days later of his injuries.

The operatives who carried out the assassination were soldiers of the Czechoslovak Army who were prepared and trained by the British Special Operations Executive with the approval of the Czechoslovak government-in-exile, led by Edvard Beneš. The Czechoslovaks undertook the operation to help confer legitimacy on the government-in-exile, and to exact retribution for Heydrich's brutal rule. The operation was the only verified government-sponsored assassination of a senior Nazi leader during the war. Heydrich's death led to a wave of reprisals by SS troops, including the destruction of villages and mass killings of civilians, including the Lidice massacre.

Multiple memorials have been created in the Czech Republic, Slovakia and the United Kingdom to commemorate both the assassination and its aftermath. The events have been the subject of various films (usually in the general context of World War II in popular culture and specifically portrayals of Heydrich).

== Background ==
=== Protectorate of Bohemia and Moravia ===
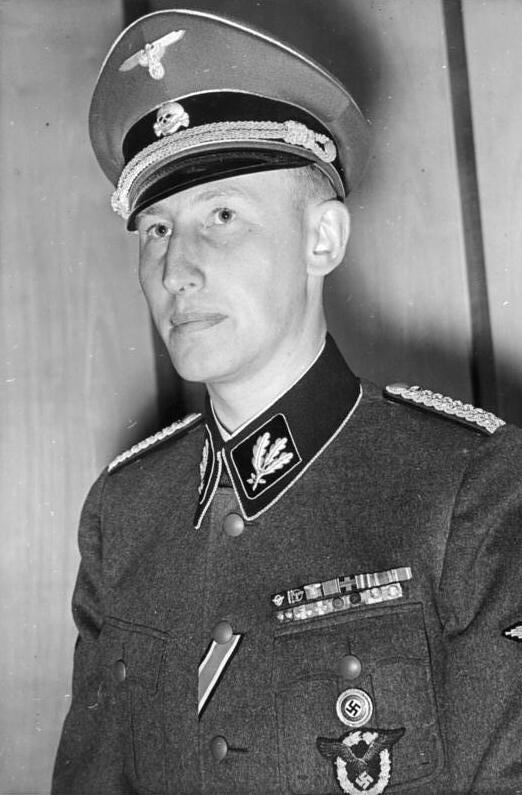
Reinhard Heydrich, the target of Operation Anthropoid

Reinhard Heydrich had been the chief of the Reich Security Main Office (RSHA) since September 1939 and was appointed acting Protector of Bohemia and Moravia after replacing Konstantin von Neurath in September 1941. Chancellor Adolf Hitler agreed with Reichsführer-SS Heinrich Himmler and Heydrich that von Neurath's relatively lenient approach to the Czechs promoted anti-German sentiment, and encouraged anti-German resistance by strikes and sabotage.

Heydrich came to Prague to "strengthen policy, carry out countermeasures against resistance", and keep up production quotas of Czech motors and arms that were "extremely important to the German war effort". During his role as de facto dictator of Bohemia and Moravia, Heydrich often drove with his chauffeur in a car with an open roof. This was a show of his confidence in the occupation forces and in the effectiveness of his government. Due to his brutal suppression of resistance and use of occupation forces to terrorize the people, Heydrich was nicknamed the Butcher of Prague, the Blond Beast and the Hangman.

=== Strategic context ===
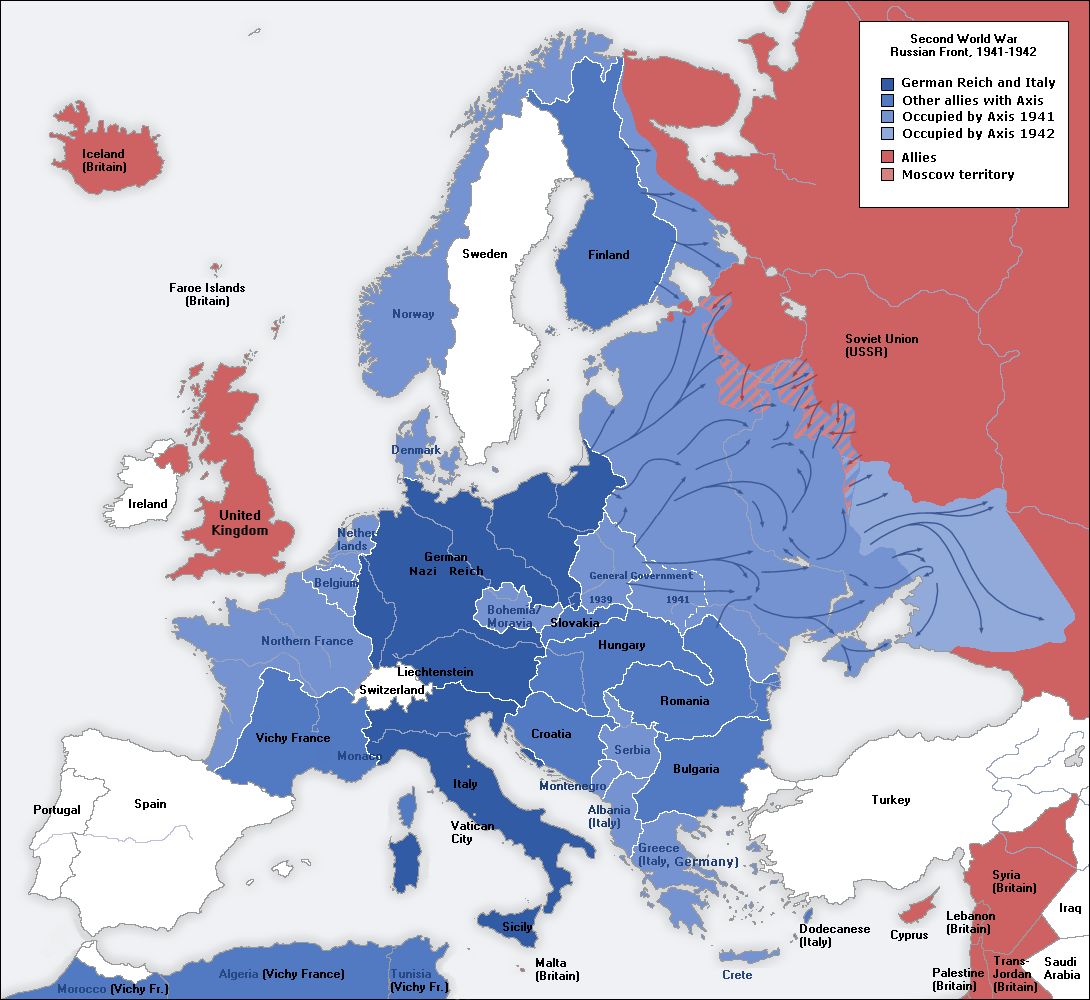
Nazi zenith 1941–42

By late 1941, Nazi Germany and its allies controlled most of Continental Europe, and German forces were approaching Moscow; the Western Allies deemed the Soviet Union's capitulation likely. The Czechoslovak government-in-exile under President Edvard Beneš came under pressure from the British government to take direct action against Nazi Germany, as there had been little visible anti-German resistance in Czechoslovakia since Germany's occupation of the Sudeten regions of the country in 1938. The takeover of these regions had been accepted by the governments of Britain and France in the Munich Agreement, and Germany began occupying the rest of Czechoslovakia in 1939. Combined with the Munich Agreement, the brutality of the German occupation seemed to break the will of the Czechoslovak public for a period.

The German invasion of the Soviet Union in June 1941 had inspired acts of anti-German sabotage by Czech communists, resulting in Heydrich's appointment. In addition to stamping out resistance and establishing the Theresienstadt ghetto/concentration camp, Heydrich had overseen a progressive policy of good wages (equivalent to those in Germany) for local industrial workers and farmers. This incentive caused the number of acts of sabotage to drop significantly and helped boost production of war materials. Heydrich was thought to be scheduled to transfer to occupied northern France and Belgium, with the intent to implement similar policies there.

Resistance movements were active from the very beginning of German occupation in several other countries defeated in open warfare (Poland, Yugoslavia and Greece), but the subjugated Czech lands remained relatively calm and produced significant amounts of materiel for Germany. The exiled government believed that it had to do something to inspire the Czechoslovaks, as well as show the world that the Czechs and Slovaks were allies of the West. In particular, Beneš felt that a dramatic action undertaken by Czechs as part of the Allied cause would make it politically harder for the British to sign any possible peace agreement with Germany that would undermine Czech national interests. Heydrich was chosen over Karl Hermann Frank as an assassination target due to his status as the acting Protector of Bohemia and Moravia and his reputation for terrorizing local citizens. The operation was also intended to demonstrate to senior Nazis that they were not beyond the reach of Allied forces and the resistance groups they supported.

== Assassination ==
=== Planning ===
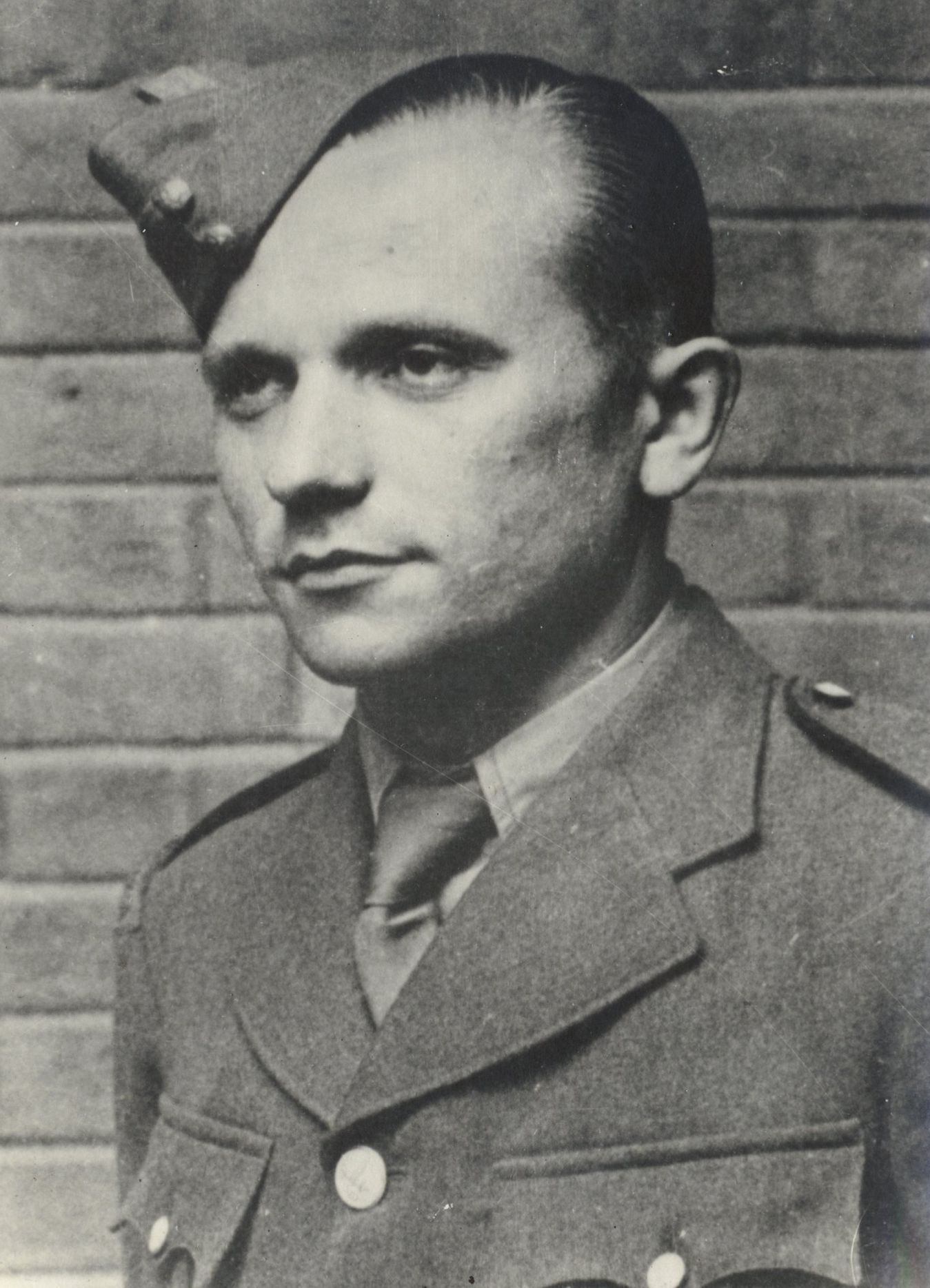
Jozef Gabčík

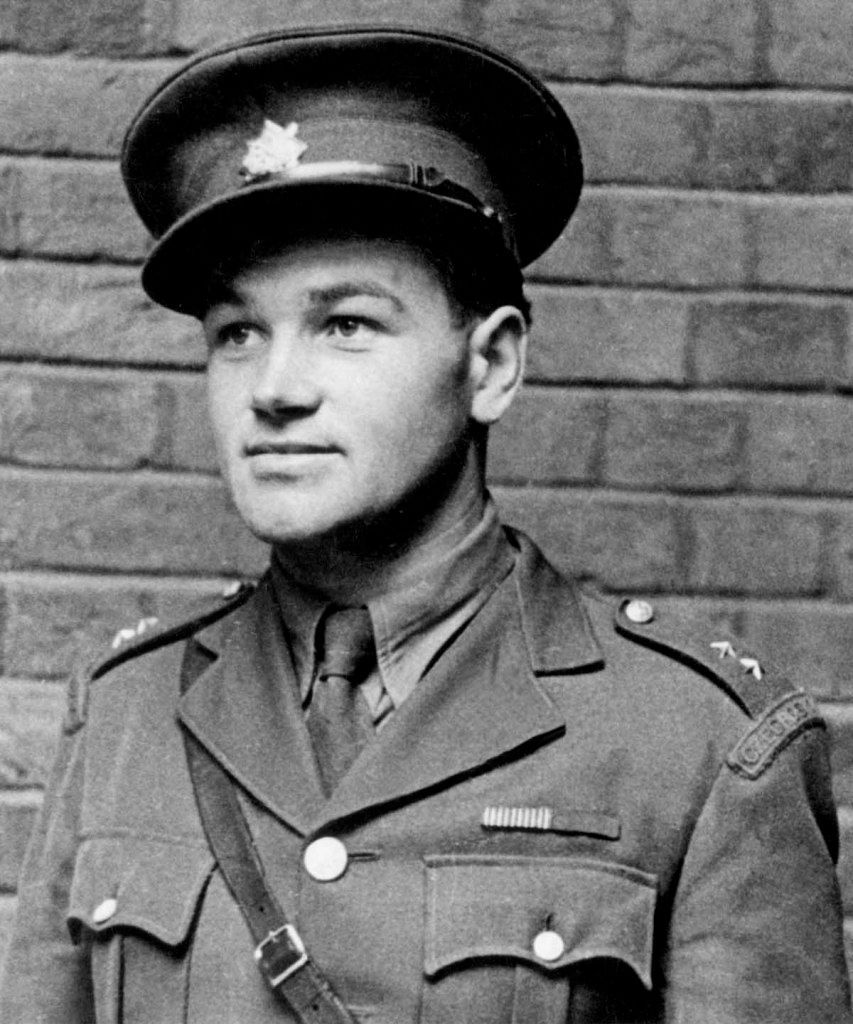
Jan Kubiš

The operation was initiated by František Moravec, head of the Czechoslovak intelligence services, with the knowledge and approval of Beneš, almost as soon as Heydrich was appointed Protector. Moravec personally briefed Brigadier Colin Gubbins, who at the time was the Director of Operations in the British Special Operations Executive (SOE) and who had responsibility for the Czech and Polish "country" sections of the organisation. Gubbins readily agreed to help mount the operation, although knowledge of it was restricted to a few of the headquarters and training staff of SOE. The operation was given the codename Anthropoid, Greek for "having the form of a human", a term usually used in zoology.

Preparation began on 20 October 1941. Moravec had personally selected two dozen of the most promising personnel from among the 2,000 exiled Czechoslovak soldiers in Britain. They were sent to one of SOE's commando training centres at Arisaig in Scotland. Warrant Officer Jozef Gabčík (Slovak) and Staff Sergeant Karel Svoboda (cs) (Czech) were chosen to carry out the operation on 28 October 1941 (Czechoslovakia's Independence Day), but Svoboda received a head injury during training and was replaced by Jan Kubiš (Czech). This caused delays in the mission because Kubiš had not completed training, nor had the necessary false documents been prepared for him.

Training was supervised by the nominal head of the Czech section, Major Alfgar Hesketh-Prichard, who turned to Cecil Vandepeer Clarke to develop the necessary weapon. It was light enough to throw but still lethal enough to destroy an armour-plated Mercedes-Benz. During extensive training, the new weapon was found to be easy to throw by Hesketh-Prichard (who had a strong cricketing background, his father having been a first-class bowler), but less so by Gabčík and Kubiš.

=== Insertion ===
Gabčík and Kubiš, along with seven other soldiers from Czechoslovakia's army-in-exile in the United Kingdom in two other groups, Silver A and Silver B (who had different missions), were flown from RAF Tangmere by a Halifax of No. 138 Squadron RAF at 22:00 on 28 December 1941. The groups, along with some supply containers, left the plane by parachute, in drops in three separate areas. The Anthropoid pair landed near Nehvizdy east of Prague. Originally, the plane had been planned to land near Pilsen, but the aircrew had navigation problems and each of the groups landed in different places from where intended. Gabčík and Kubiš moved to Pilsen to contact their allies, and from there to Prague, where the attack was planned.

In Prague, the pair contacted families and Czechoslovak resistance organisations who helped them during the preparations for the assassination. Upon learning of the nature of the mission, resistance leaders begged the Czechoslovak government-in-exile to call off the attack, saying that "[a]n attempt against Heydrich's life... would be of no use to the Allies and its consequences for our people would be immeasurable". Beneš personally broadcast a message insisting that the attack go forward, although he denied any involvement after the war. Lawyer and diplomat Vojtěch Mastný argued that Beneš "clung to the scheme as the last resort to dramatize Czech resistance".

=== Attack in Prague ===
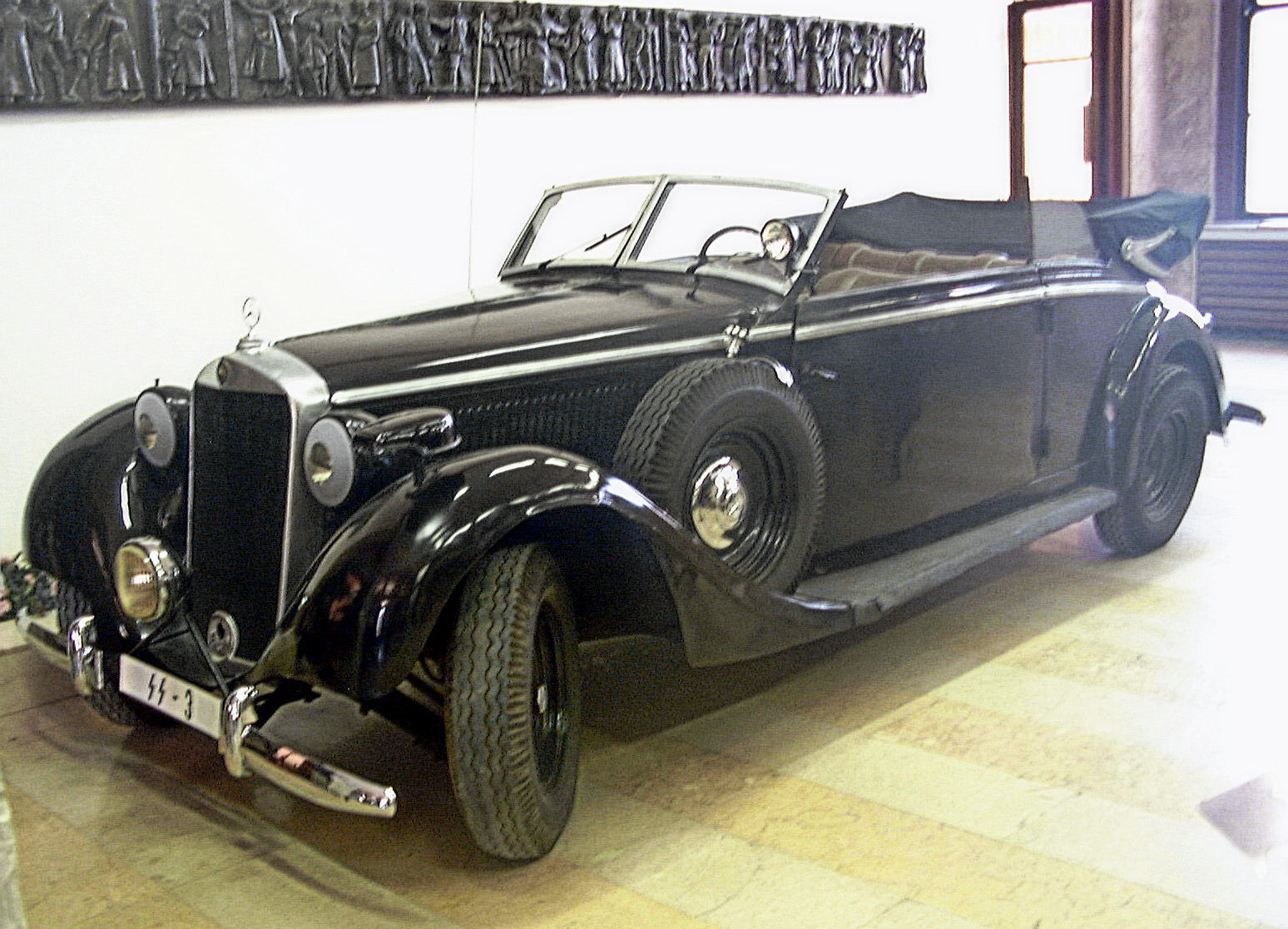
Another of Heydrich's Mercedes 320 Cabriolet B cars, this one is similar to the one in which he was mortally wounded; the original is located at Egholm Museum, Denmark.

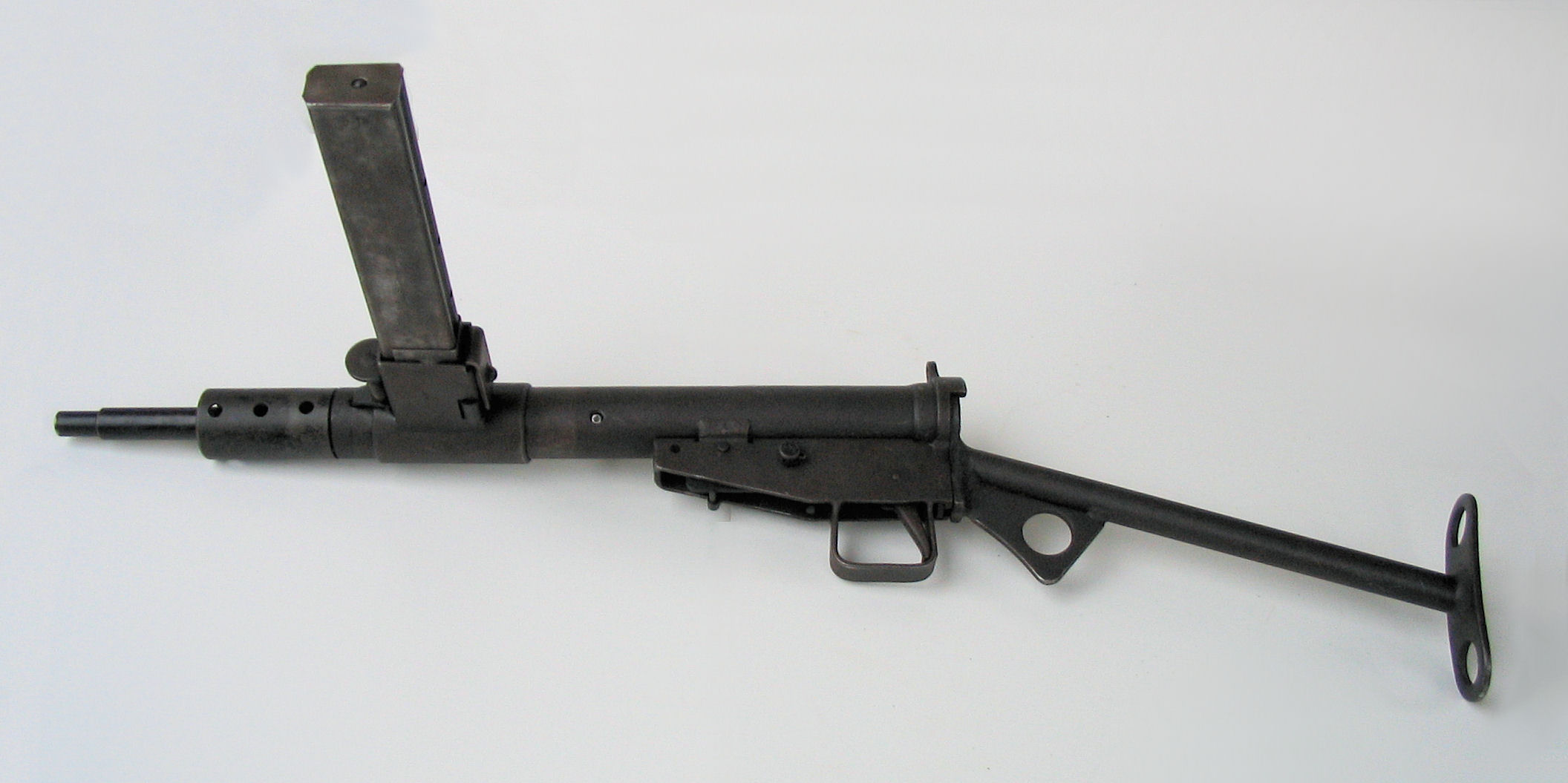
A Sten submachine gun; Gabčík's Sten gun suffered from failure to feed. Czechoslovak paratroopers often complained about the low reliability of Sten guns.

At 10:30 on Wednesday, 27 May 1942, Heydrich started his daily commute from his home in Panenské Břežany, 14 km (8.7 mi) north of central Prague, to his headquarters at Prague Castle. He was driven by SS-Oberscharführer Johannes Klein. Gabčík and Kubiš waited at the tram stop at the junction between the road then known as Kirchmayerova třída, and V Holešovičkách, in Prague 8-Libeň near Bulovka Hospital. The tight curve there would force Heydrich's car to slow down as it turned westwards into V Holešovičkách. (Note: In the intervening years, the local geography has greatly changed. Kirchmayerova třída, now named Zenklova, no longer intersects V Holešovičkách. Although a junction is still in the same place, it is formed by V Holešovičkách and two access ramps of the surrounding traffic interchange, the three roads together forming a triangular traffic island inside the hairpin turn where Kirchmayerova třída formerly intersected V Holešovičkách.) Josef Valčík (from group Silver A) was positioned about 100 m (110 yd) north of Gabčík and Kubiš to look out for the approaching car.

Heydrich's green, open-topped Mercedes 320 Cabriolet B reached the curve two minutes later. Gabčík concealed his Sten submachine gun under a raincoat. As the car slowed and rounded the corner, Gabčík dropped his raincoat and raised the gun to shoot Heydrich but the gun jammed. Heydrich stood up and drew his Luger pistol, yelling to halt instead of ordering to accelerate. As the car braked in front of him, Kubiš, who was not spotted, threw a modified No. 73 grenade (concealed in a briefcase) at the car; he misjudged his throw. Instead of landing inside the car, it landed against the rear wheel. Nonetheless, the bomb severely wounded Heydrich when it detonated, its fragments ripping through the right rear fender and embedding fragmentation and fibers from the upholstery of the car into Heydrich, causing serious injuries to his left side, with major damage to his diaphragm, spleen and lung, as well as fracturing a rib. Kubiš received a minor wound to his face from the shrapnel. The explosion shattered the windows of the tram, which had stopped on the opposite side of the road, and shrapnel struck passengers. Two SS jackets folded on the back seat of the car were whirled upwards by the blast and landed draped over the trolley wire.

Heydrich and Klein leapt out of the shattered Mercedes with drawn pistols; Klein ran towards Kubiš, who had staggered against the railings, while Heydrich went to Gabčík, who stood holding the Sten. Kubiš recovered, jumped on his bicycle and pedaled away, scattering passengers spilling from the tram by firing in the air with his Colt M1903 pistol. Klein tried to shoot at him, but dazed by the explosion, pressed the magazine release catch and the gun jammed. A staggering Heydrich came towards Gabčík, who dropped his Sten and tried to reach his bicycle but was forced to abandon the attempt and took cover behind a telegraph pole, firing at Heydrich with his pistol. Heydrich returned fire and ducked behind the stalled tram, when he suddenly doubled over and staggered to the side of the road in pain. He collapsed against the railings, holding himself up with one hand. As Gabčík took the opportunity to run, Klein rushed to help his superior. Heydrich, his face pale and contorted in pain, pointed toward the fleeing Gabčík, saying, "Get that bastard!" As Klein gave pursuit, Heydrich stumbled along the pavement before collapsing against the bonnet of his wrecked car. Gabčík fled into a butcher shop, where the owner, a man named Brauer, who was a Nazi sympathiser and had a brother who worked for the Gestapo, ignored his request for help. Brauer ran out to the street and attracted Klein's attention by shouting and pointing to the shop. Klein, whose gun was still jammed, ran into the shop and collided with Gabčík in the doorway. In the confusion, Gabčík shot him twice, severely wounding him in the leg. Gabčík escaped on a tram, and reached a local safe house. At this point, Gabčík and Kubiš did not know that Heydrich was wounded and thought the attack had failed.

=== Medical treatment and death ===
A Czech woman and an off-duty policeman went to Heydrich's aid and flagged down a delivery van. Heydrich was first placed in the driver's cab but complained that the truck's movement was causing him pain. He was transferred to the back of the truck on his stomach and taken to the emergency room at Bulovka Hospital. Dr. Slanina packed the chest wound, while Walter Dick, the Sudeten German chief of surgery at the hospital, tried to remove the shrapnel splinters.

Josef Hohlbaum (a Silesian German who was chairman of surgery at Charles University in Prague) operated on Heydrich with Dick and Slanina's assistance. The surgeons reinflated the collapsed left lung, removed the tip of the fractured 11th rib, sutured the torn diaphragm, inserted several catheters and removed the spleen, which contained a grenade fragment and upholstery. Himmler, Heydrich's superior, dispatched his personal physician, Karl Gebhardt, who flew to Prague and arrived that evening. After 29 May, Heydrich was entirely in the care of SS physicians. Postoperative care included administration of large amounts of morphine.

Conflicting accounts exist concerning whether sulfanilamide, a new antibacterial drug, was given; Gebhardt testified at his 1947 war crimes trial that it was not. Theodor Morell, Hitler's doctor, suggested its use, but Gebhardt, thinking Heydrich was recovering, declined. Heydrich developed a fever of 38–39 °C (100–102 °F) and wound drainage, and he was in great pain. Despite the fever, his recovery appeared to progress well. On 2 June, during a visit by Himmler, Heydrich reconciled himself to his fate by reciting a part of one of his father's operas:

Ja, die Welt ist nur ein Leierkasten,
die unser Herrgott selber dreht.
Jeder muß nach dem Liede tanzen,
das gerade auf der Walze steht.

The world is just a barrel-organ
which the Lord God turns Himself.
We all have to dance to the tune
which is already on the drum.

Heydrich's fever and drainage subsided and his condition appeared to be improving until, while sitting up eating a noon meal on 3 June, he suddenly went into shock. He soon slipped into a deep coma and died on Thursday, 4 June around 4:30 a.m. Heydrich's facial expression as he died betrayed an "uncanny spirituality and entirely perverted beauty, like a renaissance Cardinal", according to Bernhard Wehner, a Kriminalpolizei police official who investigated the assassination. An autopsy concluded he died of sepsis.

One of the hypotheses was that some of the horsehair in the upholstery of Heydrich's car was forced into his body by the blast of the grenade, causing a systemic infection. Another suggestion was that Heydrich died of a massive pulmonary embolism (and possibly a fat embolism). In support of the latter possibility, particles of fat and blood clots were found at autopsy in the right ventricle and pulmonary artery and severe oedema was noted in the upper lobe(s) of the lungs, while the lower lobes were collapsed.

=== Botulinum poisoning hypothesis ===
The authors of A Higher Form of Killing claim that Heydrich died from botulism (Clostridium botulinum) toxin poisoning. According to this hypothesis, based on statements made by Paul Fildes, a Porton Down botulism researcher, the No. 73 anti-tank grenade used in the attack had been modified to contain botulinum toxin. The authors say that only circumstantial evidence supports this allegation; SOE records for the period have remained sealed and few medical records of Heydrich's condition and treatment have been preserved.

The evidence cited to support the hypothesis includes the modifications made to the No. 73 grenade: the bottom two-thirds of this weapon had been removed, and the open end and sides were wrapped up with adhesive tape. The modification of the weapon could indicate an attached toxic or biological agent. Heydrich received excellent medical care by the standards of the time. His post mortem examination showed none of the usual signs of sepsis, although infection of the wound and areas surrounding the lungs and heart was reported. A German wartime report on the incident stated, "[d]eath occurred as a consequence of lesions in the vital parenchymatous organs caused by bacteria and possibly by poisons carried into them by bomb splinters".

Heydrich's condition while hospitalized was not documented in detail, but he was not noted to have developed any of the distinctive symptoms associated with botulism, which have a gradual onset, invariably including paralysis, with death generally resulting from respiratory failure. Two others were also wounded by fragments of the same grenade — Kubiš, the Czech soldier who threw the grenade, and a bystander — but neither was reported to have shown any sign of poisoning.

The botulinum toxin theory has not found widespread acceptance among scholars. Fildes had a reputation for "extravagant boasts", and the grenade modifications could have been aimed at making the 4.4 lb (2 kg) weapon lighter. Two of the six original modified grenades are kept by the Military History Institute in Prague.

== Consequences ==
=== Reprisals ===
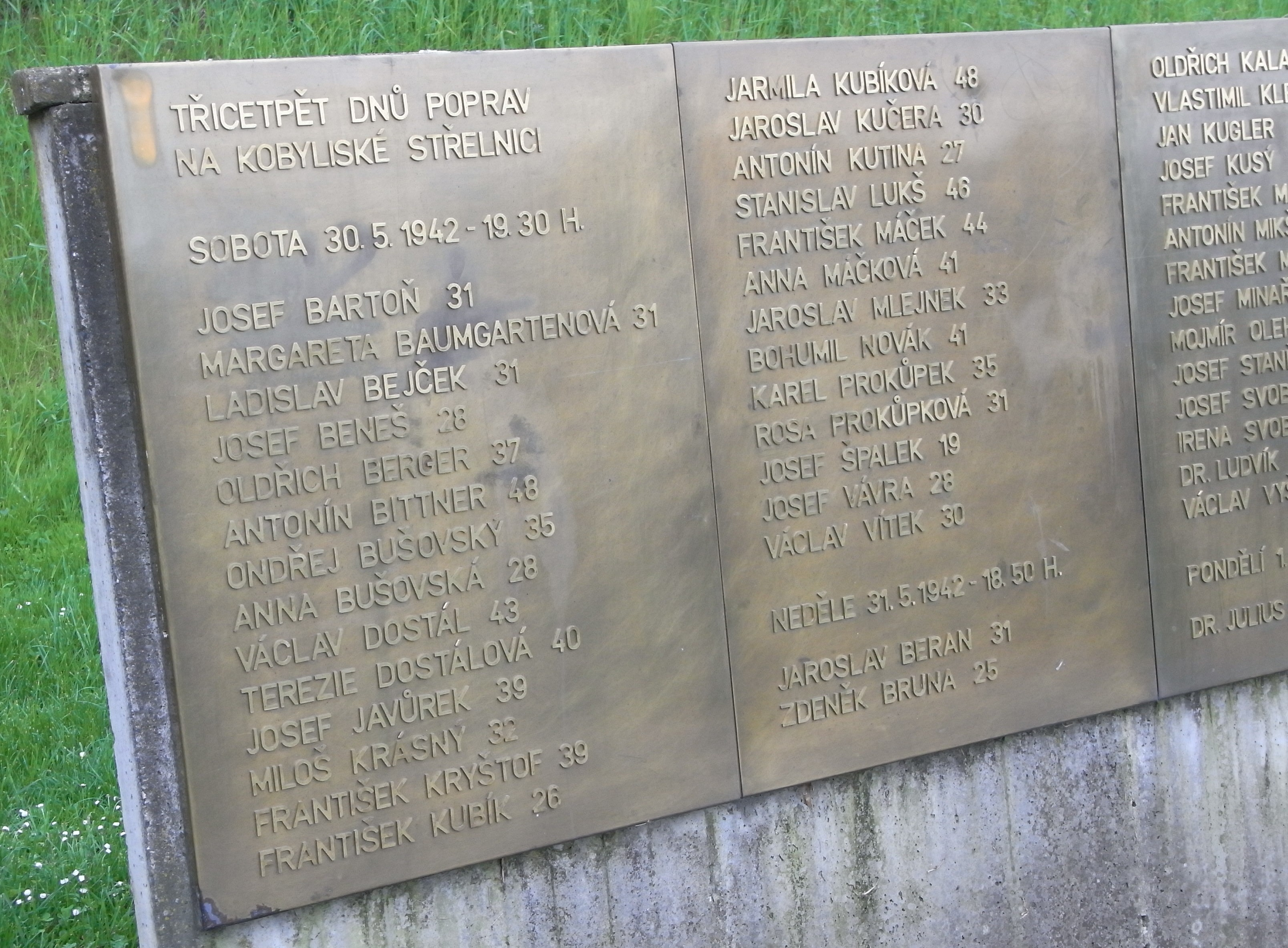
Memorial plaques with names of the victims at the Kobylisy Shooting Range in Prague, where over 500 Czechs were executed in May and June 1942

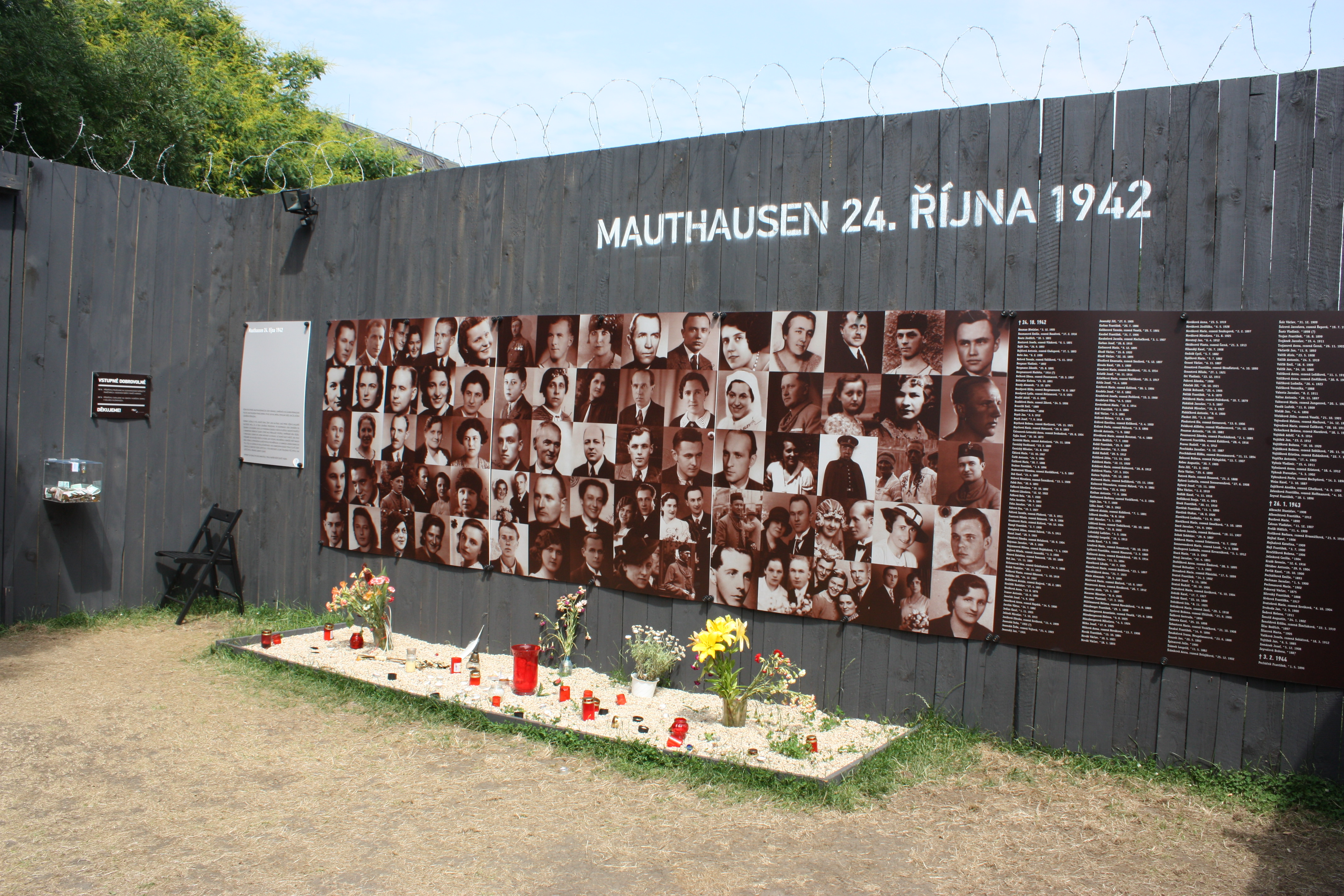
Memorial monument in Prague commemorating the relatives of Jan Kubiš and Josef Valčík and their fellows, in total 294 people, who were executed in Mauthausen (262 people on 24 October 1942, 31 people on 26 January 1943 and the last one on 3 February 1944)

Hitler ordered an investigation and reprisals on the day of the assassination attempt, suggesting that Himmler send SS General Erich von dem Bach-Zelewski to Prague. According to Karl Hermann Frank's postwar testimony, Hitler knew Zelewski to be even harsher than Heydrich. Hitler favoured killing 10,000 politically unreliable Czechs, but after he consulted Himmler, the idea was dropped because Czech territory was an important industrial zone for the German military, and indiscriminate killing could reduce the productivity of the region.

According to one estimate, 5,000 people were murdered in the reprisals. More than 13,000 people were arrested, including Kubiš's girlfriend Anna Malinová, who died in the Mauthausen concentration camp. Adolf Opálka's aunt, Marie Opálková, was executed in the Mauthausen camp on 24 October 1942; his father Viktor Jarolím was also killed.

Nazi intelligence falsely linked Heydrich's assassins to the village of Lidice. A Gestapo report suggested Lidice was the hiding place of the assassins, since several Czech army officers exiled in England were known to have come from there. On 10 June 1942, the Germans committed the Lidice massacre; 199 men were killed, 195 women were deported to Ravensbrück concentration camp and 95 children taken prisoner. Of the children, 81 were later killed in gas vans at the Chełmno extermination camp, while eight were adopted by German families. The Czech village of Ležáky was also destroyed because a radio transmitter belonging to the Silver A team was found there. The men and women of Ležáky were murdered, both villages were burned and the ruins of Lidice were levelled.

=== Investigation and manhunt ===
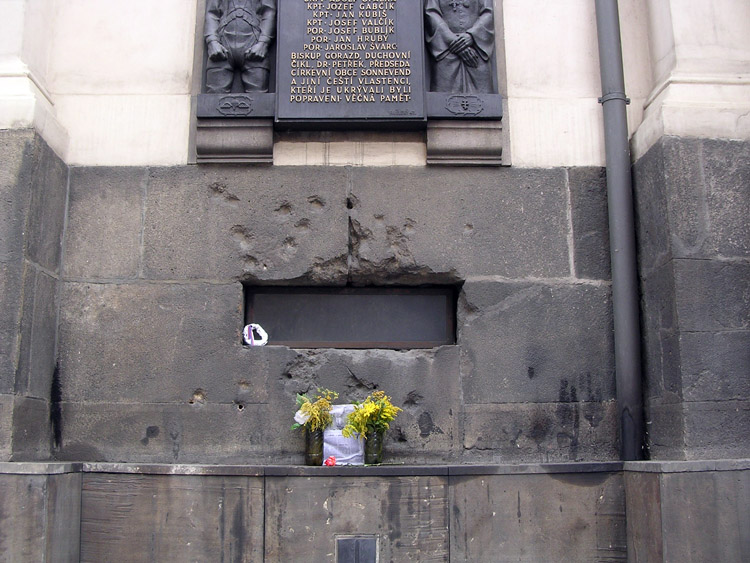
Bullet-scarred window of the Saints Cyril and Methodius Cathedral in Prague where the attackers were cornered

In the days following the Lidice massacre, no leads were found for those responsible for Heydrich's death. A deadline was issued to the military and the people of Czechoslovakia for the assassins to be apprehended by 18 June 1942. If they were not caught by then, the Germans threatened to spill far more blood, believing that this threat would be enough to force a potential informant to sell out the culprits. Many civilians were indeed wary and fearful of further reprisals, making hiding information much longer increasingly difficult. The assailants initially hid with two Prague families and later took refuge in the Cathedral of Sts Cyril and Methodius (until 1935 the Karel Boromejsky Church) a cathedral of the Czech and Slovak Orthodox Church in Prague. The Germans were unable to locate the attackers until Karel Čurda of the Out Distance sabotage group turned himself in to the Gestapo and gave up the names of the team's local contacts for the bounty of 1,000,000 ℛ︁ℳ︁.

Čurda betrayed several safe houses provided by the Jindra group, including that of the Moravec family in Žižkov. At 05:00 on 17 June, the Moravec flat was raided. The family was made to stand in the hallway while the Gestapo searched their flat. Marie Moravec was allowed to go to the toilet, where she bit into a cyanide capsule and killed herself. Alois Moravec was unaware of his family's involvement with the resistance; he was taken to the Petschek Palace together with his 17-year-old son Vlastimil, or "Ata", who was tortured throughout the day but refused to talk. The youth was stupefied with brandy, shown his mother's severed head in a fish tank, and warned that, if he did not talk, his father would be next; Ata gave in. Ata was executed by the Nazis in Mauthausen on 24 October 1942, the same day as his father, his fiancée, her mother and her brother.

Waffen-SS troops laid siege to the church the following day, but they were unable to take the assailants alive, despite the best efforts of 750 SS soldiers under the command of SS-Gruppenführer Karl Fischer von Treuenfeld. They also brought along Čurda, who tried to get them to surrender by shouting: "Kamarádi, vzdejte se! Nic se vám nestane! Mně se také nic nestalo." (transl. Friends, surrender! Nothing will happen to you! Nothing happened to me either.) to which the paratroopers fired back and shouted: "Jsme Češi! Nikdy se nevzdáme, slyšíte? Nikdy!" (transl. We are Czechs! We will never surrender, you hear? Never!) Adolf Opálka and Josef Bublík were killed in the prayer loft after a two-hour gun battle, and Kubiš was reportedly found unconscious and died shortly after from his injuries. Gabčík, Josef Valčík, Jaroslav Švarc and Jan Hrubý killed themselves in the crypt after repeated SS attacks, attempts to force them out with tear gas and fire brigade trucks brought in to try to flood the crypt. The SS report about the fight mentioned five wounded SS soldiers. The men in the church had only pistols, while the attackers had machine guns, submachine guns and hand grenades. After the battle, Čurda confirmed the identity of the dead Czech resistance fighters, including Kubiš and Gabčík.

Bishop Gorazd took the blame for the actions in the church to minimize the reprisals among his flock, and even wrote letters to the Nazi authorities, who arrested him on 27 June 1942 and tortured him. On 4 September 1942, the bishop, the church's priests and senior lay leaders were taken to Kobylisy Shooting Range in a northern suburb of Prague and shot. For his actions, Bishop Gorazd was later glorified as a martyr by the Eastern Orthodox Church.

=== Aftermath ===
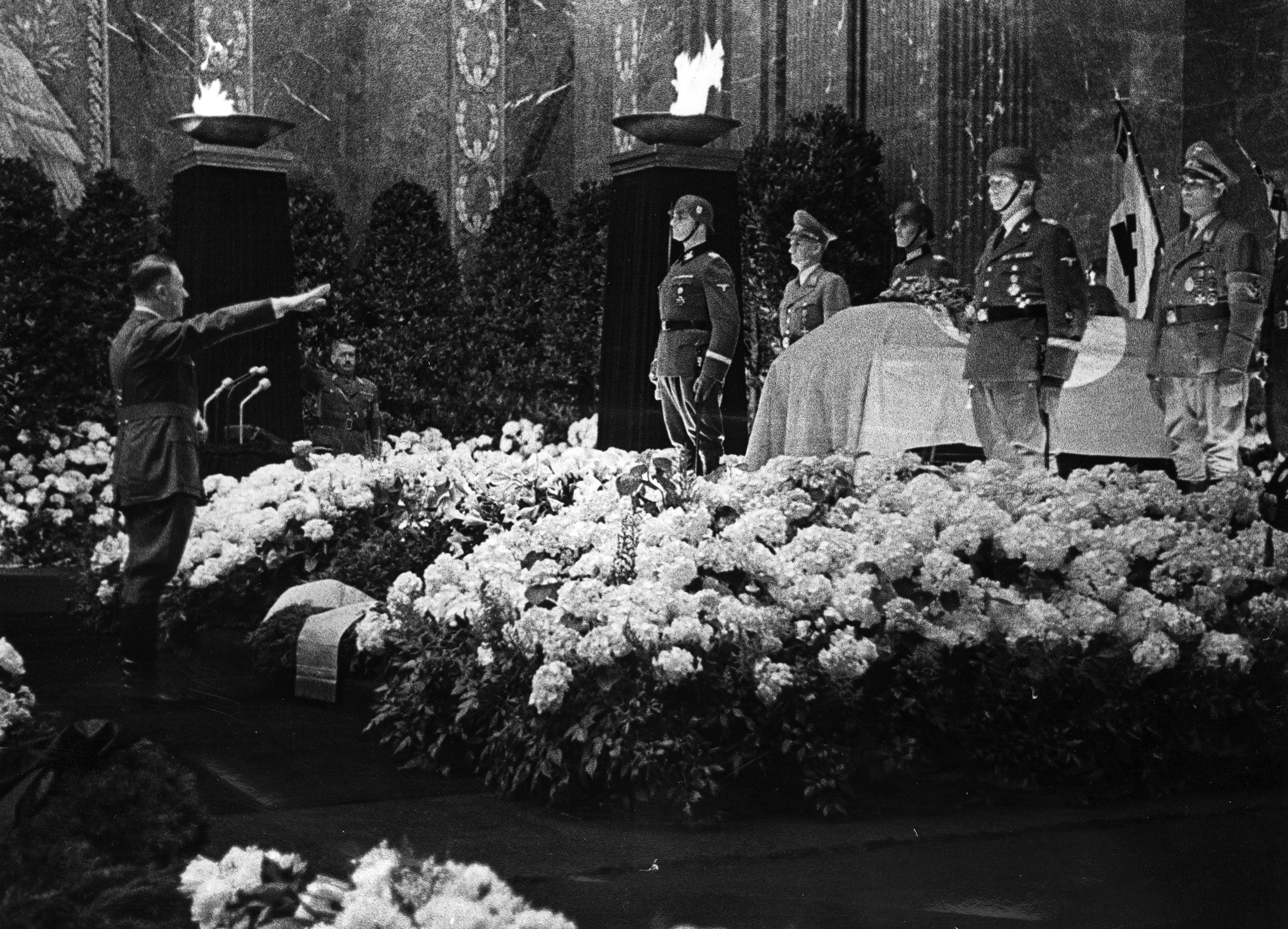
Hitler saluting Heydrich's coffin during the latter's funeral ceremony

Two large funeral ceremonies were held for Heydrich as one of the most important Nazi leaders, first in Prague, where the way to Prague Castle was lined by thousands of SS men with torches, and then in Berlin attended by all high-ranking Nazi figures. Hitler attended the Berlin ceremony and placed the German Order and Blood Order medals on Heydrich's funeral pillow.

The assassination of Heydrich was one of the most significant moments of the resistance in Czechoslovakia. Čurda, who had betrayed Heydrich's assassins, was hanged for high treason in 1947 after attempting suicide.

On 5 August 1942, British Foreign Secretary Anthony Eden issued a declaration that Germany had voided the Munich Agreement through its actions. However, the declaration did not commit the UK to Czechoslovakia's pre-Munich borders, nor did it declare the agreement void ab initio as the Czechoslovak government-in-exile wanted. As such, Eden's declaration has been argued to not be a full repudiation of the agreement. A September 1942 declaration by the French National Committee suggested that the agreement was void ab initio since it had come about under threat of aggression. The committee recognized no changes in Czechoslovakia's borders as of 1938.

Neither the Czech government-in-exile nor the SOE likely foresaw that the Germans would apply the principle of Sippenhaft (collective responsibility) on the scale they did to avenge Heydrich's assassination. Moreover, decisions whether to conduct assassinations are resistant to a rational decision process. Computing the probability of success, or the cost-versus-benefit aspect, is inherently difficult. Even if it were possible, the benefit (in this case, the diplomatic value of Eden's repudiation of the Munich Agreement) was not in a form that Beneš could readily compare against the nature of the cost (the loss of Czech civilian lives). British Prime Minister Winston Churchill was so infuriated by the scale of reprisals as to suggest levelling three German villages for every Czech village that the Nazis destroyed. Two years after Heydrich's death, Operation Foxley, a similar assassination plan, was drawn up against Hitler, but never implemented.

Operation Anthropoid was the only successful government-organized assassination of a top-ranking Nazi official. The Polish underground killed two senior SS officers in the General Government in Operation Kutschera and Operation Bürkl; Wilhelm Kube, the General-kommissar of Belarus, was killed in Operation Blowup by Soviet partisan Yelena Mazanik, a Belarusian woman who had managed to find employment in his household.

== Memorials ==
Memorial plaque on the Church of Saints Cyril and Methodius

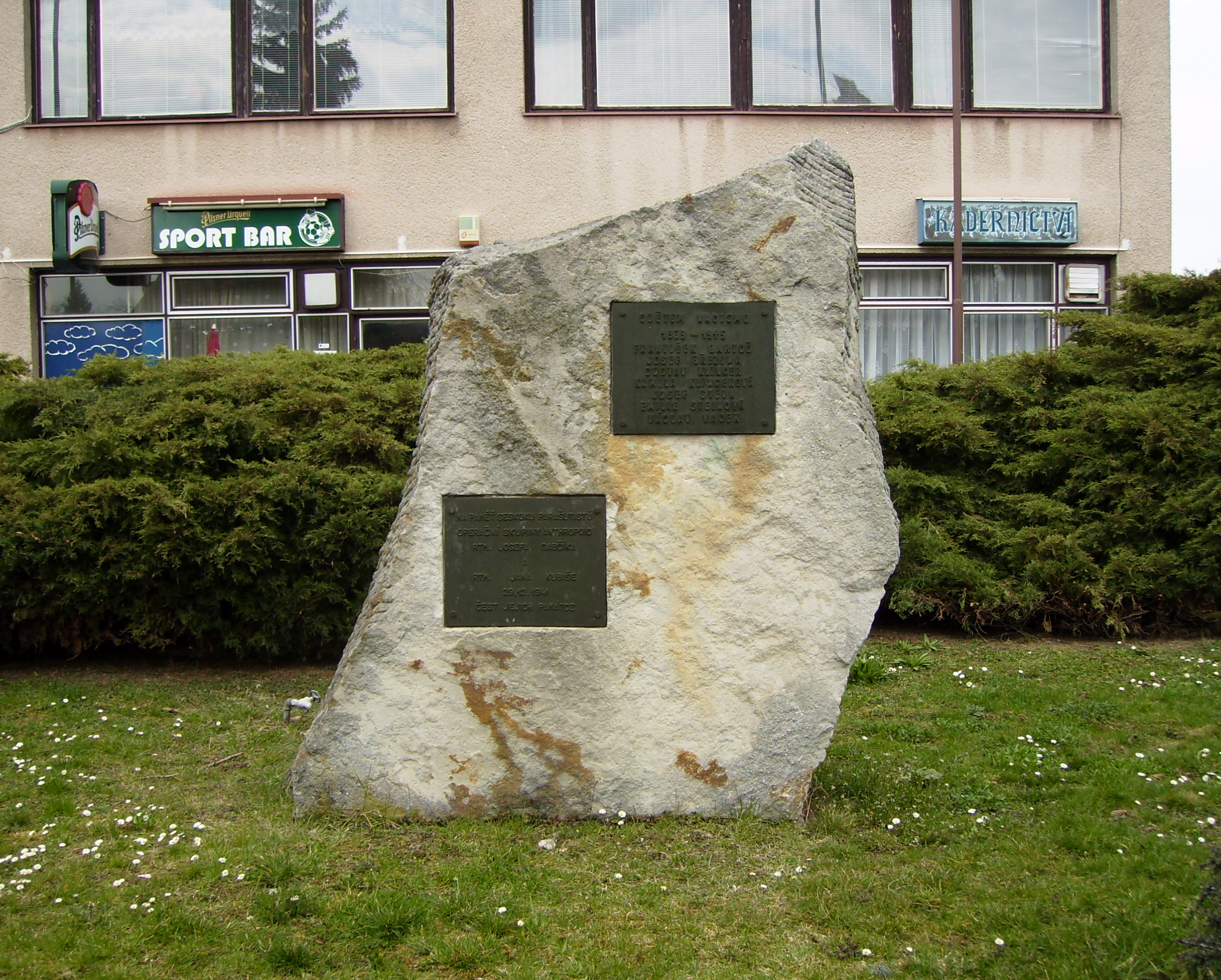
Memorial to Gabčík and Kubiš in Nehvizdy

The soldiers of Operation Anthropoid, their helpers and the operation itself were memorialized in the Czech Republic and abroad. The oldest memorial is a plaque on the Cathedral of Saints Cyril and Methodius in Resslova Street, Prague. It was created in 1947 by an ex-soldier of the Czechoslovak army-in-exile, František Bělský and is dedicated to the paratroopers, the clergymen and other Czech patriots who died for the sake of the operation.

The National Memorial to the Heroes of the Heydrich Terror was created beneath the Cathedral of Saints Cyril and Methodius in 1995. Later, it underwent significant reconstruction and the extended exposition was reopened in 2010.

Another important monument is in the form of a fountain, and symbolically commemorates the seven paratroopers. It was installed in 1968 in the Jephson Gardens in the English town of Leamington Spa. The headquarters of the Czechoslovak military training camp during the Second World War were in Leamington.

The Slovak National Museum opened an exhibition in May 2007 to commemorate the heroes of the Czech and Slovak resistance, one of the most important resistance actions in the whole of German-occupied Europe.

The Anthropoid Operation Memorial, 2009, Prague, authors: sculptor David Mojescik and sculptor Michal Smeral; architects: M. Tumova and J. Gulbis.

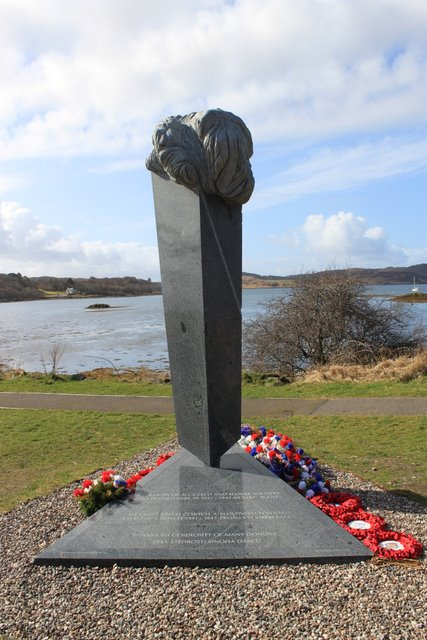
Czech Soldiers' Memorial at Arisaig in western Scotland

Also, a memorial has been placed in Arisaig, Scotland, to the Czechoslovak members of SOE who trained in that area, with a list of those killed and the missions in which they took part.

In October 2011, a memorial plaque was unveiled on residential block Porchester Gate (London), which housed the Czechoslovak military intelligence service and where the Operation Anthropoid was planned in October 1941.

== Portrayals in literature and popular culture ==
=== Literature ===
Jiří Weil's 1959 book Mendelssohn is on the Roof features the assassination of Reinhard Heydrich as a subplot.

The story of Operation Anthropoid is narrated in a short Czech comic book titled Atentát (The Assassination), created in 1976 by brothers Jan Saudek and Kája Saudek. It was published in 1976 in the Polish comic-book magazine Relax, as Zamach (The Assassination).

The alternative history novel The Man with the Iron Heart by Harry Turtledove is based on the premise that Heydrich survives the assassination attempt, and leads a postwar insurgency campaign, using the Werwolf.

Jiří Šulc's novel Dva proti Říši (literally Two Men Against The Empire) describes the events long before the assassination, assassination itself, its consequences and a detailed look at the life of the Czech resistance and exiled paratroopers in the Protectorate.

Laurent Binet's novel HHhH (Himmlers Hirn heißt Heydrich, or "Himmler's brain is called Heydrich"), published in 2010 by Grasset & Fasquelle, is a metafictional novel chronicling the lives of Reinhard Heydrich and his assassins Jozef Gabčík and Jan Kubiš.

=== Movies ===
The following movies depict Operation Anthropoid or portray the assassination as a crucial moment of the film's plot:

- Hangmen Also Die! (1943)
- Hitler's Madman (1943)
- Muži bez křídel (1946)
- Romeo, Julie a tma (1960)
- Atentát (1964)
- Sokolovo (1975)
- Operation Daybreak (1975)
- Protector (2009)
- Lidice (2011)
- Bullet for Heydrich (2013 TV movie)
- Anthropoid (2016)
- The Man with the Iron Heart (2017)

=== Songs ===
There are two Czech songs about Operation Anthropoid - one is by Jan Vyčítal, from Czech country band Greenhorns, called Battledress (2006). The second song is by Daniel Landa, called Anička Malinová (2022; Anna Malinová was Gabčík's girlfriend. She was executed by Nazis in Mauthausen).

== Gallery ==
Church of Saints Cyril and Methodius is where the Czechoslovak paratroopers died after being cornered, and the memorial there is for those killed by the SS in retaliation for Operation Anthropoid.

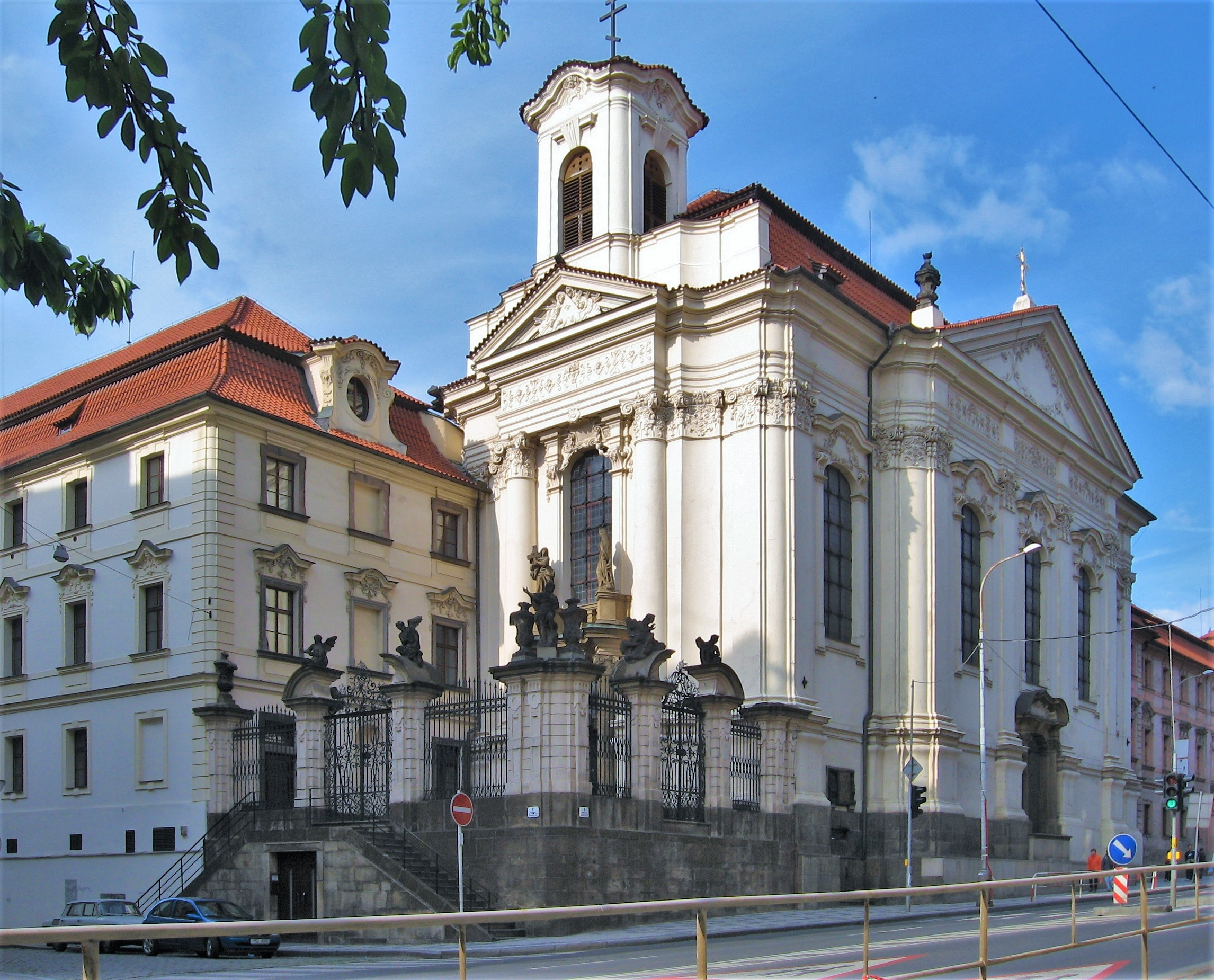
Orthodox Church of Saints Cyril and Methodius

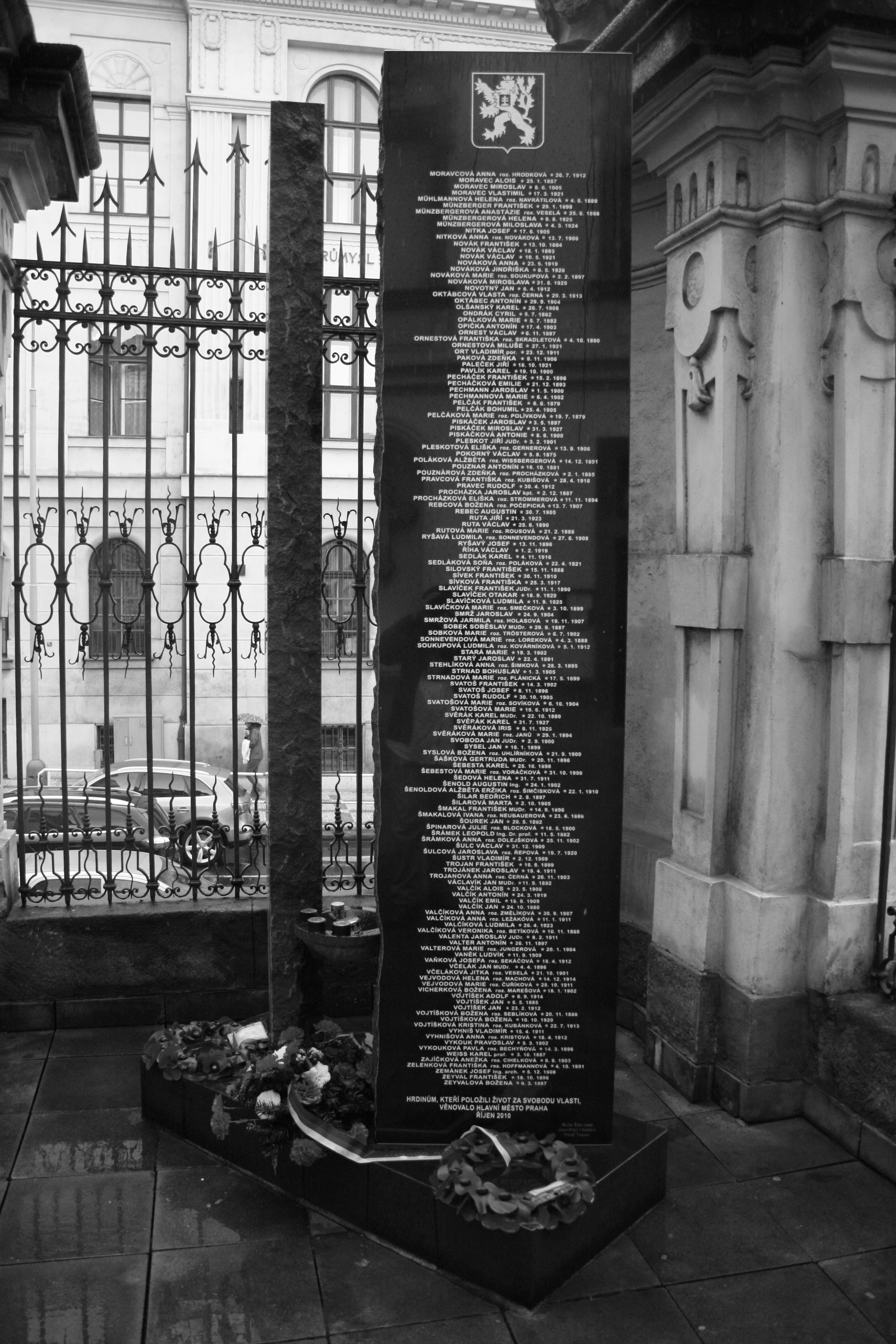
Photo of memorial outside door of the church

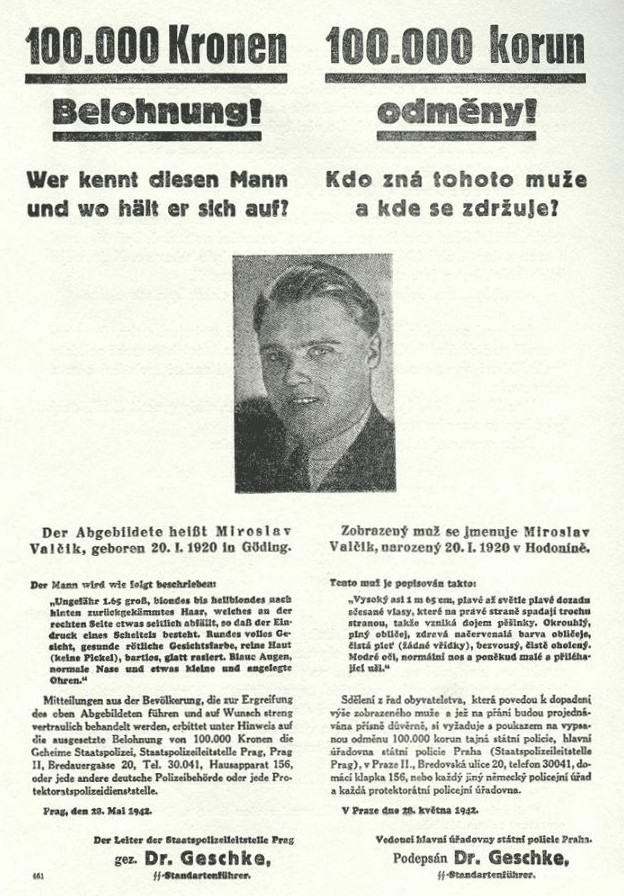
Reward poster for Sgt. Josef Valčík, one of the assassins of Heydrich

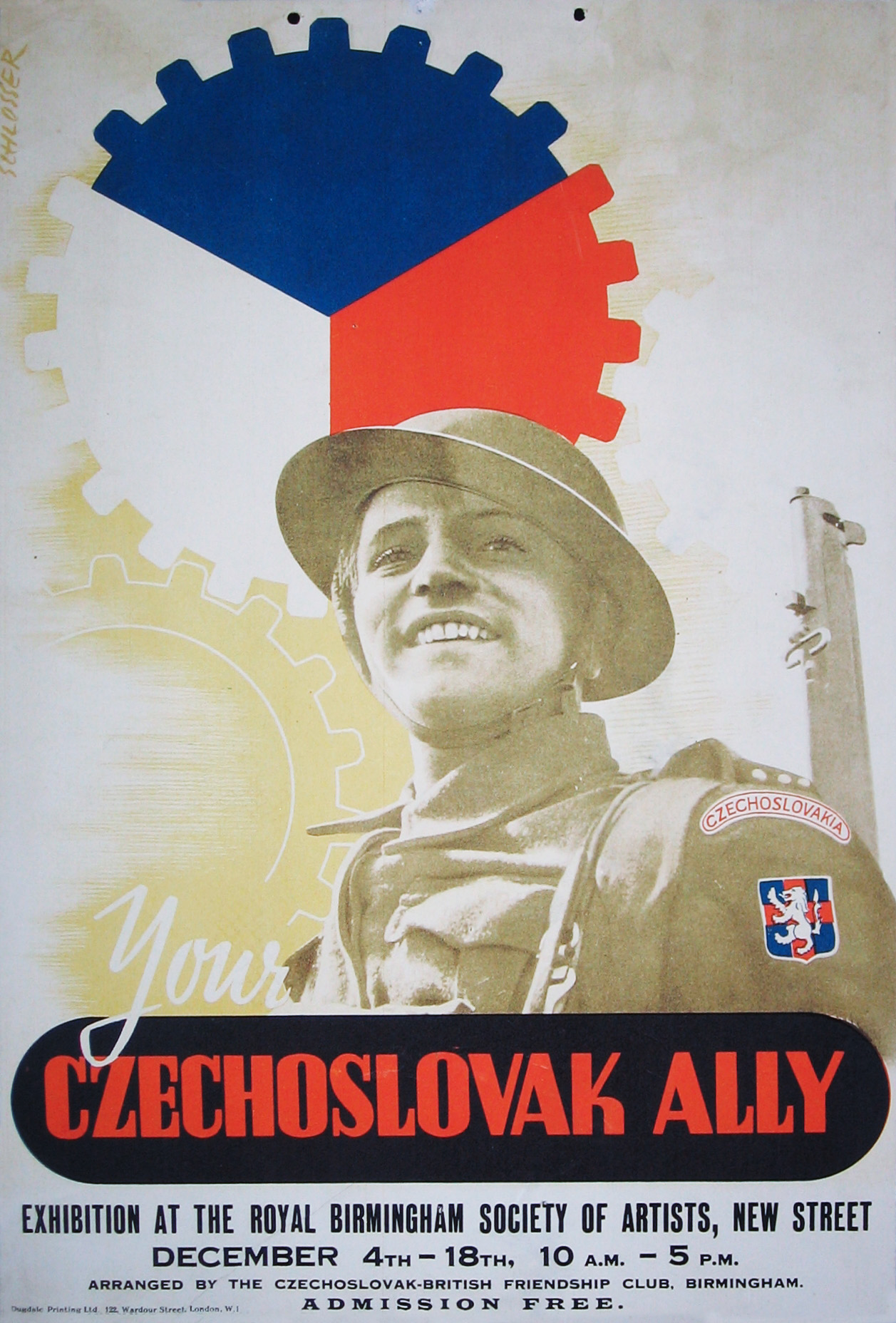
Poster with Sgt. Jan Hrubý, who died in the fight with German troops in the crypt of the Church of Saint Cyril and Methodius

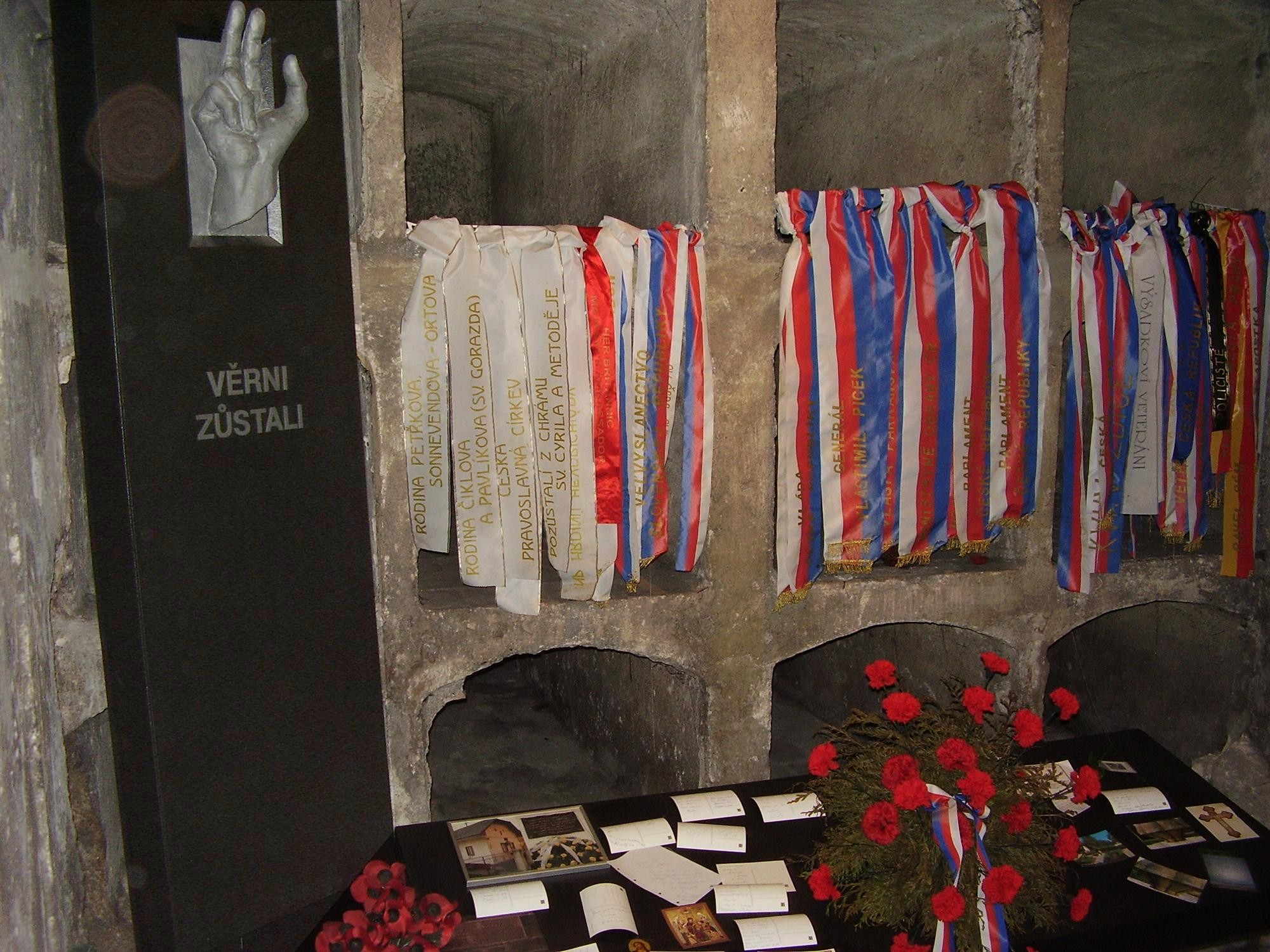
Memorial in the crypt of the Church of St. Cyril and St. Methodius

== See also ==
- Aston House - Station XII
- Czech resistance to Nazi occupation
- Occupation of Czechoslovakia
- Operation Kutschera – Polish assassination of the SS and Police Leader Franz Kutschera in 1944
- List of Nazi Party leaders and officials
- List of rulers of the Protectorate Bohemia and Moravia
