= Operation Daybreak =

1975 film

- Directed by: Lewis Gilbert
- Screenplay by: Ronald Harwood
- Based on: Seven Men at Daybreak; 1960 novel by Alan Burgess
- Produced by: Carter DeHaven
- Starring: Timothy Bottoms; Martin Shaw; Joss Ackland; Nicola Pagett; Anthony Andrews
- Cinematography: Henri Decaë
- Edited by: Thelma Connell
- Music by: David Hentschel
- Production companies: Howard R. Schuster, Inc. American Allied Studios; Barrandov Studios
- Distributed by: Warner Bros. Pictures (US); Columbia-Warner Distributors (UK)
- Release dates: November 1975 (US (limited)); 29 February 1976 (UK)
- Running time: 118 minutes
- Countries: Czechoslovakia; United States; Yugoslavia
- Languages: English; German

Operation Daybreak (also known as The Price of Freedom in the U.S. and Seven Men at Daybreak during production) is a 1975 war film based on the true story of Operation Anthropoid, the assassination of SS general Reinhard Heydrich in Prague. Starring Anthony Andrews, Timothy Bottoms and Martin Shaw, the film was directed by Lewis Gilbert and shot mostly on location in Prague. It is adapted from the book Seven Men at Daybreak by Alan Burgess.

== Plot ==
In late 1941, General František Moravec commands three Czech partisans, Jan Kubiš, Jozef Gabčík, and Karel Čurda, who were trained by the British, to undertake a crucial military operation described as being the most important of the war. Reinhard Heydrich, the ruthless Reich Protector in Prague, is seen as a potential successor to Hitler if the Fuhrer were to die. The men parachute into occupied Czechoslovakia, but their landing is not where it was intended to be. Gabčík injures his foot during the descent and Čurda falls several miles away. After regrouping with Čurda, they head to Prague and are offered refuge by the Moravec family: aunt Marie and her son Ata and daughter Jindřiška, where they plan how to execute Heydrich.

The first attempt to assassinate Heydrich on his departing train is thwarted. Under vigilance from Gabčík, Kubiš hides in a control room and aims his rifle at Heydrich, but another train abruptly passes to the opposite direction, obstructing the trajectory. They devise a new plan to shoot Heydrich as his car slows down at a bend in the road during his regular morning drive into the city from his country residence. When Heydrich approaches, Gabčík's gun jams, and he runs away, pursued by Heydrich's driver. Kubiš, who is sitting nearby, then throws a grenade at the car, causing it to explode nearby and injuring Heydrich, who later dies at hospital due to mortal wounds caused by the shrapnel.

A manhunt is launched as the Gestapo offer a large sum of money for an informant who can give a lead to their capture. Čurda, who fears for his wife and child's safety, surrenders to the Gestapo, betraying Gabčík, Kubiš and their group. The Moravec family is arrested after learning of Čurda's intelligence. The paratroopers seek refuge in the crypt of Saints Cyril and Methodius Cathedral, but when the Germans discover their location, a long battle ensues. The Germans try to force them out by gassing and flooding the crypt. Knowing they cannot escape alive and unwilling to surrender, the assassins fatally shoot each other in the flooded crypt.

== Cast ==
- Timothy Bottoms as Sergeant Jan Kubiš
- Anthony Andrews as Sergeant Jozef Gabčík
- Martin Shaw as Sergeant Karel Čurda
- Nicola Pagett as Anna Malinová
- Joss Ackland as Janák
- Ray Smith as Hájek
- Vernon Dobtcheff as Pyotr
- Diana Coupland as aunt Marie Moravcová
- Ronald Radd as aunt Marie's Husband
- Kim Fortune as Ata Moravec
- Pavla Matějovská as Jindřiška
- Cyril Shaps as Father Petrek
- Anton Diffring as acting Reichsprotektor Reinhard Heydrich
- Carl Duering as Karl Hermann Frank, Secretary of State of the Reich Protectorate of Bohemia and Moravia
- George Sewell as Heinz Pannwitz, Chief Investigator
- Reinhard Kolldehoff as Fleischer, Gestapo
- Philip Madoc as Heydrich's interpreter
- Kika Markham as Čurda's Wife
- Nigel Stock as General František Moravec
- Frank Gatliff as Surgeon
- Jiří Krampol as Lt Adolf Opálka (leader of the second set of paratroopers)

== Production ==
=== Development ===
The screen rights to the novel Seven Men at Daybreak by Alan Burgess were acquired by Warner Bros. Pictures in mid-1973. Filming on the wartime-action movie based on the book, itself based on a factual story, was announced to be starting in November 1974 with screenplay by Ronald Harwood, and based on the factual events of the assassination of Reinhard Heydrich. The film was produced by Carter Dehaven and directed by Lewis Gilbert. Gilbert says he was approached to do the project.

=== Casting ===
In November 1974, Timothy Bottoms signed to star in the film. To prepare for the role of Kubiš, leader of the group and eventual hero who does the killing, Bottoms spent three months on location in Czechoslovakia. The casting of Anthony Andrews, Martin Shaw, and Nicola Pagett, all of whom had acting experience at London's West End theatre, was announced in December 1974. Anton Diffring was cast as Heydrich and was familiar to viewers for his frequent performances as Nazi officers in war films in the 1950s and 1960s. Diffring was in his mid-50s when he assumed the role, despite Heydrich being 38 when he was killed.

In January 1975, Gilbert announced that the actor chosen to play Adolf Hitler had to be replaced, as the original actor turned out to be too small for the role. Calls were made to Gunnar Möller and George Sewell, the latter of whom went on to play Heinz Pannwitz.

The size of the cast, which included actors of German, French, Finnish and Czech origin, was around 3,000.

=== Filming ===
The film was entirely produced and financed by Warner Bros., a Hollywood studio, and was shot on location in Prague, Czechoslovakia, using various places that were part of the real assassination. Scenes outside Prague were filmed in the town of Karlovy Vary. During filming, cast and crew were accommodated in Prague's Alcron Hotel, with little opportunity to explore the city. Bottoms was accompanied by his wife Alicia, who described the local population as "very guarded" and unprepared to handle tourists. They struggled to find accommodation, eventually settling on a tiny apartment that they rented for $1,000 a week.

The Swastika flag was hung around Prague and in particular at Prague railway station. Younger extras on the set, who had no experience of the war, showed little emotion. In one instance, an elderly woman arriving from the countryside needed reassurance from railway station workers that the German invaders had not returned, while another Czech woman was observed glancing with disgust at an actor wearing a full Nazi SS uniform.

For the destruction of Lidice, the movie deployed convincing replica Tiger tanks, built on the T-34 chassis. Historic film footage from the destruction is inter-cut with new film footage shot by Gilbert.

=== Post production ===
Gilbert considered it a "good film" but felt it came along "fifteen years too late... there was nothing in it for people to relate to." However, the film impressed Albert Broccoli and prompted the producer to hire Gilbert to direct The Spy Who Loved Me.

== Music ==
David Hentschel composed the score on an ARP synthesizer and the orchestra was conducted by Harry Rabinowitz.

== Critical reception ==
Colin Bennett of Australia's The Age newspaper wrote that while the latter part of the film was "very moving", this only compensated for the "quiet drabness" earlier in the film. He believed the film had authenticity and the acting was mostly understated, suggesting that British actors Andrews and Shaw eclipsed Bottoms, who was promoted as the star of the film. Film critic Tony Sloman described the film as a "grimly exciting war drama", describing Andrews as "excellent" in his role as a Czech patriot. Writing for The Baltimore Sun, R. H. Gardner was critical of the film's omission of historical context and felt the film lacked "the punch a chronicle of such a tragic and heroic event should have".

== Historical inaccuracies ==
While the film remains broadly true to the facts of the operation, critics have highlighted some inaccuracies and omissions. The circumstances leading up to the assassination of Heydrich were largely ignored, with the implication that the operation was primarily an effort to remove a man who may have been the successor to Adolf Hitler, yet Heydrich was not considered second to Hitler within the Nazi party. While the film portrays the British Special Operations Executive as being responsible for the operation, in reality they had little involvement, as it was primarily the Czechoslovak government-in-exile that organised the operation. The operation was considered a necessity by Winston Churchill in an effort to raise Allied morale, despite the expectation of German retribution. The film failed to emphasize this facet or the involvement of those whose actions ultimately resulted in the Nazi destruction of Lidice.

The film does not show that aunt Marie Moravcová commits suicide in the toilet by ingesting a capsule of cyanide. Similarly, Ata was not interrogated in the flat as the film suggests, but was arrested along with his father. After his mother's suicide, he was shown her severed head and warned that his father would be killed if he did not reveal information to the Gestapo. This is not shown in the film.

In the film, Sergeant Karel Curda's betrayal made him appear as a "treacherous weakling", though in reality his confession came after an order by Hitler for the execution of 30,000 Czech political prisoners of war.

The finale shows Kubiš and Gabčík sacrificing each other in a flooded crypt, yet in reality, Kubiš was found unconscious in the church by the Nazis and taken to hospital where he was pronounced dead within twenty minutes. Other reports from the time suggested that the Gestapo claimed the paratroopers were captured while hiding and were immediately executed.

== See also ==
- Dramatic portrayals of Reinhard Heydrich
