= Ivan Kolařík =

Czech soldier (1920–1942)

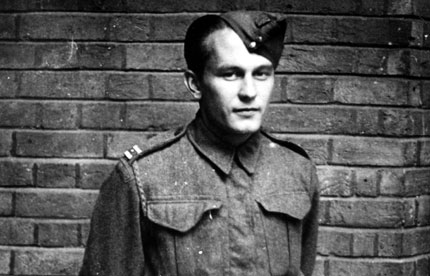
Ivan Kolařík

Ivan Kolařík (22 March 1920 – 1 April 1942) was a Czechoslovak soldier and member of the anti-Nazi resistance group Out Distance. While being closely pursued by the Gestapo, he committed suicide to avoid exposing the rest of the group.
