= Karel Čurda =

Czech resistance fighter and Nazi collaborator (1911-1947)

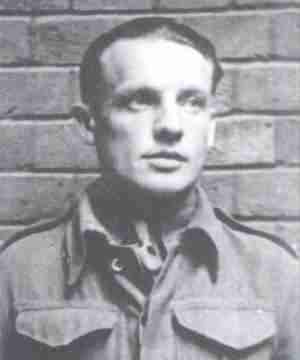
- Born: 10 October 1911: Stará Hlína, Austria-Hungary; (now Třeboň, Czech Republic)
- Died: 29 April 1947 (aged 35); Pankrác Prison, Prague, Czechoslovakia
- Burial place: Ďáblice cemetery
- Military career
- Allegiance: Czech resistance; (until 1942); Nazi Germany (from 1942)
- Branch: Czechoslovak Army; Czechoslovak government-in-exile; (until 1942)
- Rank: Sergeant Major
- Unit: Out Distance (SOE)
- Conflicts: World War II; Operation Anthropoid (defected)
- Criminal information
- Status: Executed by hanging
- Conviction: Treason
- Penalty: Death

Details
- Imprisoned at: Pankrác Prison

Karel Čurda (10 October 1911 – 29 April 1947) was a Czech resistance fighter who later became a Nazi collaborator during World War II. He informed on the assassins of Reinhard Heydrich, who were later all cornered and killed.

== Wartime activities ==
A soldier of the Czechoslovak Army in exile, Čurda was parachuted into the protectorate in 1942 as a member of the sabotage group Out Distance. Later that year, he betrayed the Czechoslovak army agents responsible for the assassination of top Nazi official Reinhard Heydrich in Prague. His reward was 10 million Kronen or 1 million Reichsmarks and a new identity, "Karl Jerhot." He married a German woman and spent the rest of the war as a Gestapo collaborator.

== Execution ==
After the war, Čurda was tracked down and arrested. When asked in court how he could betray his comrades, he reportedly answered, "I think you would have done the same for 1 million marks." He was found guilty of treason and hanged on 29 April 1947 at Pankrác Prison, alongside fellow collaborator Viliam Gerik.

== Alternative theory ==
Modern Czech historian Jiří Plachý gave a different account of his personality and motives. According to research, Čurda stayed with his family in South Bohemia in the immediate aftermath of the assassination. That put him under huge pressure as he knew the Nazis could wipe out his whole family or village, just as they had wiped out Lidice and Ležáky. It is posited that this was the key factor in his actions.

== Fictional depictions ==
In the film Operation Daybreak (1975), Čurda is portrayed by Martin Shaw. In Anthropoid (2016), he was portrayed by Jiří Šimek. In The Man with the Iron Heart (2017), he was portrayed by Adam Nagaitis.

== See also ==
- Operation Anthropoid
