= Dramatic portrayals of Reinhard Heydrich =

Dramatic portrayals of Reinhard Heydrich number among the more numerous of any Second World War figure, comparable to Adolf Hitler as well as war films depicting Erwin Rommel. Reinhard Heydrich has been portrayed in both television and film, and was one of the few high ranking Nazis to be depicted in a dramatic film while the Second World War was still ongoing.

== Film and television ==
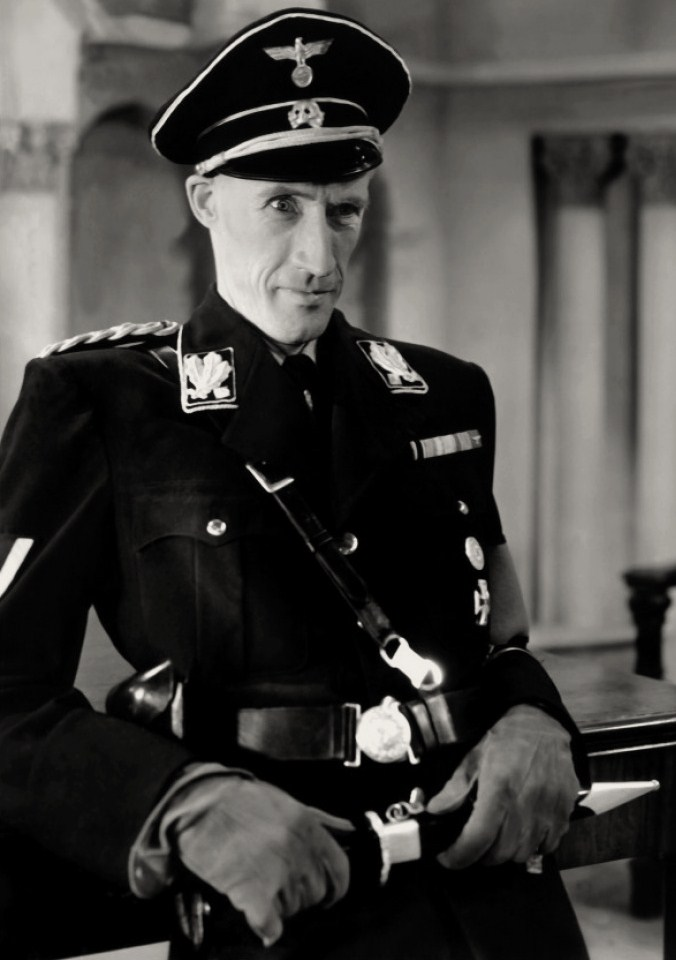
John Carradine as Heydrich in Hitler's Madman (1943) directed by Douglas Sirk

The first known portrayal of Reinhard Heydrich was in the 1943 Hollywood film Hangmen Also Die!, in which Heydrich was played by Hans Heinrich von Twardowski. The same year, he was the subject of the feature Hitler's Madman, starring John Carradine. Further works produced during World War II were The Hitler Gang, with Peter Pohlenz portraying Heydrich, and Air Raid Wardens in which he was played by Don Costello.

Later, on US television, Heydrich was portrayed by Alvin Epstein in a 1960 episode of the series Armstrong Circle Theatre, entitled "Engineer of Death: The Eichmann Story"; and by Kurt Kreuger in a two-part episode of GE True in 1963. Heydrich was portrayed by David Warner in the 1978 miniseries Holocaust. Warner would again play the character in the 1980s television production Hitler's SS: Portrait in Evil. Warner's performance was rated as "cunning and chilling", with the Holocaust miniseries receiving several television awards.

Within West German productions, Heydrich was portrayed by Martin Held in the 1954 film Canaris (renamed Deadly Decision in the US). Malte Petzel played Heydrich in the 1963 television miniseries Das Kriminalgericht and again in the 1966 telemovie Der Fall der Generale. Heydrich was also played by Siegfried Loyda in the 1964 film Atentát; and by Martin Benrath in the 1967 telemovie, Heydrich in Prag.

Anton Diffring portrayed Heydrich in the 1965 television series Interpol (in the episode titled Geld Geld Geld – Zwei Milliarden gegen die Bank von England). Diffring portrayed Heydrich again a decade later, in Operation Daybreak, a US film focused on the assassination of Heydrich in Prague and filmed on location in Czechoslovakia. It is adapted from the book Seven Men at Daybreak by Alan Burgess. Atentát and Operation Daybreak set the standard for the procedural-style rundown of the assassination itself, which the mainstream of later films follow.

Heydrich appeared as a character in the 1977 West German television production Manager des Terrors (1977) where he was portrayed by Dietrich Mattausch. Mattausch's performance was viewed as "cold and stunning", and he reprised the role of Heydrich in the acclaimed 1984 West German telemovie The Wannsee Conference. The Wannsee Conference would inspire the remake Conspiracy (2001), with British actor Kenneth Branagh, whose performance was described as a "chilling portrayal" of Heydrich. Philipp Hochmair stars as Heydrich in the 2022 German TV docudrama Die Wannseekonferenz, about the same conference.

Within Czechoslovak cinema, Heydrich appeared in the 1974 war film Sokolovo, portrayed by Hannjo Hasse, an East German actor who often represented Nazi villains in East European war films. The character of Heydrich is further frequently mentioned in Czechoslovak movies dealing with the topic of the Nazi reprisals which followed Heydrich's assassination as well as his role in enforcing Nazi directives in the Protectorate of Bohemia and Moravia.

In 2009, the character of Heydrich briefly appeared, played by Ondřej Matějka as a non-speaking extra, in the Czech Lion Awards-winning Czech drama film Protektor, where the main character (a radio commentator/Nazi-collaborator) describes him as "tall figure [who] attracts attention like a magnet". This movie also features a minimalist representation of Heydrich's assassination which is not seen, only heard in the background. In 2011, the extensive Czech television series (44 episodes) named Heydrich — konečné řešení (Heydrich — Final solution) used historical footage of Reinhard Heydrich combined with reenactment scenes in which he was portrayed by an uncredited actor.

In 2011, Czech director Petr Nikolaev finished his drama film Lidice, with Heydrich portrayed by German actor Detlef Bothe. Bothe had portrayed Heydrich before – he appeared briefly in two episodes of the BBC documentary series Auschwitz: The Nazis and the 'Final Solution' (2005). He played Heydrich for the third time in the 2016 British-Czech-French thriller Anthropoid. Bothe has been described as a "dead ringer" of Heydrich. The following year saw the release of the war thriller film The Man with the Iron Heart based on Laurent Binet's novel HHhH (The Man with the Iron Heart is the name of another novel about Heydrich), with Heydrich portrayed by Australian actor Jason Clarke.

In the 2015 Amazon Studios streaming television series The Man in the High Castle, an alternate history drama based on the Philip K. Dick's novel of the same name, Heydrich is portrayed by American actor Ray Proscia. In this story, the Axis forces were victorious and have occupied the former United States. By 1962, Heydrich has reached the age of 58 and risen to the rank of SS-Oberst-Gruppenführer. He takes part in a conspiracy to assassinate Hitler and install Martin Huesmann (Sebastian Roche) as Führer in order to start a war with the Empire of Japan and is later executed on orders of Nazi American leader John Smith (Rufus Sewell).

== Novels ==
In Harry Turtledove's alternative history novel The Man with the Iron Heart (2008), Heydrich survives the 1942 assassination attempt in Czechoslovakia by partisans and later goes on to lead an insurgent movement against the Allied occupation of Germany.

In Robert Harris' alternative history novel Fatherland (1992), it is 1964, the United Kingdom surrendered to Nazi Germany twenty years earlier and the Nazis are trying to negotiate peace with the United States, which is supporting a severely-reduced Soviet Union as it continues to fight against Nazi forces; Heydrich survived the 1942 assassination attempt in Czechoslovakia, is head of the SS after Heinrich Himmler was killed in an aircraft crash, and is covering up the Final Solution by having all attendees of the Wannsee Conference murdered.

In Philip K. Dick's alternative history novel The Man in the High Castle (1962), the Axis Powers have won the Second World War, America has been conquered and carved up between the Greater Germanic Reich and Imperial Japan, Hitler has been removed from office because of his syphilis and Heydrich is one of the Nazis vying to succeed Hitler as the Führer of Germany.

In Eric Norden's 1973 The Ultimate Solution the Axis Powers have won the Second World War and carved up the world between themselves; Hitler has been removed from office after going mad and has been placed in a lunatic asylum; Germany and Japan are in the middle of a Cold War and both have nuclear weapons; Heydrich leads a successful Coup d'etat overthrowing Albert Speer and starts World War III against Japan.

Heydrich is one of the principal figures in a number of the Bernie Gunther detective stories written by the late Philip Kerr. Set in the 1930's and 1940's Heydrich forces Gunther to work for him a situation Gunther is powerless to stop but he finds extremely distasteful.

== Other media ==
The story of the 1942 assassination was narrated in a short Czech comic book titled Atentát ("The Assassination"), created in 1976 by brothers Jan Saudek and Kája Saudek. It was published in 1976 in the Polish comic book magazine Relax, as "Zamach" ("The Assassination").

A fictional iteration of Reinhard Heydrich is one of the chief characters in Takashi Masada's popular visual novel video game Dies irae.

In the Manga Hellsing (and its anime adaptation Hellsing Ultimate) the Major names one of his Zeppelins for Heydrich.
