= Hangmen Also Die! =

1943 film by Fritz Lang

- 1943 Theatrical Poster
- Directed by: Fritz Lang
- Screenplay by: John Wexley
- Story by: Fritz Lang; Bertolt Brecht
- Produced by: Fritz Lang; Arnold Pressburger
- Starring: Brian Donlevy; Walter Brennan; Anna Lee; Gene Lockhart; Dennis O'Keefe; Alexander Granach
- Cinematography: James Wong Howe
- Edited by: Gene Fowler Jr.
- Music by: Hanns Eisler
- Production company: Arnold Pressburger Films
- Distributed by: United Artists
- Release dates: March 27, 1943 (premiere); April 1943 (general)
- Running time: 134 minutes
- Country: United States
- Language: English
- Budget: $850,000

Hangmen Also Die! is a 1943 war film directed by the Austrian director Fritz Lang and written by John Wexley from a story by Bertolt Brecht (credited as Bert Brecht) and Lang. The film stars Brian Donlevy, with Walter Brennan, Anna Lee, and Gene Lockhart, and Dennis O'Keefe in support. Alexander Granach has a showy role as a Gestapo detective, and Hans Heinrich von Twardowski has a cameo as Reinhard Heydrich. Hanns Eisler composed the Academy Award nominated score, and James Wong Howe was cinematographer.

The film is loosely based on the 1942 assassination of Heydrich, the Nazi Reich Protector of German-occupied Bohemia and Moravia during World War II. The number-two man in the SS, and a chief mastermind of the Holocaust, Heydrich earned the epithet of "The Hangman of Europe." Though the real Heydrich was assassinated by Czechoslovak soldiers parachuted from a British plane in Operation Anthropoid, this was not known at the time of filming. Instead, Heydrich's killer is depicted as a member of the Czech resistance with ties to the Communist Party.

== Plot ==
In Prague, during the Nazi occupation of Czechoslovakia, surgeon Dr. František Svoboda, a member of the Czech resistance, assassinates the brutal "Hangman of Europe", Reichsprotektor Reinhard Heydrich. Before he can escape the scene his getaway car is discovered, forcing his planned safe house to reject him. When a stranger, Mascha, deliberately misdirects nearby German soldiers searching for him, he seeks out her home as a sanctuary. Her father, Professor Stephen Novotny, realizes Svoboda must be the assassin, but is willing to risk everything to hide him.

Because the assassin now cannot be found, the Nazi leaders take four hundred Czech men as hostages and threaten to execute them forty at a time, until the killer turns himself in or is betrayed by his own people. Professor Novotny is one of the hostages. Mascha demands that Svoboda surrender so Professor Novotny will not be executed. When he refuses, she goes to the Gestapo to denounce him. But when she arrives, the sight of oppressed Czech citizens moves her to plead for her father’s release instead. The Gestapo arrest her and the rest of the Novotnys but can find no evidence that they were involved in the assassination, even after bugging the Novotnys’ apartment.

Gestapo Inspector Gruber continues to believe Mascha knows who the assassin is and offers the release of Professor Novotny in exchange for information. Based on staged conversations between Mascha and Svoboda, the Gestapo hierarchy believe that Mascha is cheating on her fiancé, Jan, with Svoboda. Nonetheless, Gruber begins to gather intelligence on Svoboda.

Emil Czaka, a wealthy local brewer, is part of the resistance and attends its meetings and knows its leaders. In reality, he is a German and fifth-columnist. When resistance members trick him into revealing he is a collaborator he escapes as Gestapo agents kill or arrest most of the other resistance members.

One of the resistance leaders wounded by the Gestapo, Dedic, devises a plan to frame Czaka for the assassination. Acting on planted intelligence, Gruber is persuaded that Svoboda and Mascha are having an affair. Mascha then makes a scene at a restaurant to get herself and Czaka taken to Gestapo headquarters, where she claims that Czaka was the man she saw fleeing after Heydrich’s assassination. Her story is supported by the false testimony of many people. When Gruber deduces that Svoboda’s relationship with Mascha has been staged, Svoboda and Jan kill him. Czaka is then framed for this murder as well. Gestapo agents gun him down.

Although Mascha is told that the remaining hostages will be freed, the Gestapo instead liquidates them all—including her father. Several weeks later, the Nazi Party determines that Czaka could not have been the murderer but that no good could come of reopening the case.

== Cast ==
- Brian Donlevy – Dr. Franticek Svoboda
- Walter Brennan – Prof. Stephen Novotny
- Anna Lee – Mascha Novotny
- Gene Lockhart – Emil Czaka (brewer)
- Dennis O'Keefe – Jan Horak (Mascha's fiancé)
- Nana Bryant – Mrs. Hellie Novotny
- Hans Heinrich von Twardowski – Reinhard Heydrich
- Margaret Wycherly – Ludmilla Novotny
- Tonio Selwart – Chief of Gestapo Kurt Haas
- Alexander Granach – Gestapo Insp. Alois Gruber
- Reinhold Schünzel – Gestapo Insp. Ritter
- William Roy – Beda Novotny
- Jonathan Hale – Dedic
- Lionel Stander – Vanya (taxi driver)
- Sarah Padden – Mrs. Dvorak
- Byron Foulger – Bartos
- Ludwig Donath – Gestapo Insp. Schirmer
- Arno Frey – Camp Lieutenant
- Edmund MacDonald – Dr. Pillar
- Lester Sharpe – Rudy
- Arthur Loft – General Votruba
- George Irving – Necval
- James Bush – Pescacek

== Production ==
A number of working titles have been reported for Hangmen Also Die: "Never Surrender", "No Surrender", "Unconquered", "We Killed Hitler's Hangman" and "Trust the People". It has also been known as "Lest We Forget". It has been claimed that when a book with a similar title to "Never Surrender" or "No Surrender" was published while the film was in production, the producers held a contest for the cast and crew to suggest a new title. The contest was won by a production secretary who received the $100 prize.

Teresa Wright, John Beal, and Ray Middleton were also considered at one point to appear in the film, which went into production in late October 1942 and wrapped in mid-December of that year.

Director Fritz Lang had considered beginning the film with Edna St. Vincent Millay's poem "The Murder of Lidice". He decided against it, but the poem does appear in MGM's film about Heydrich, Hitler's Madman (1943).

Hangmen was Brecht's only American film credit, though he wrote many scripts for Hollywood that were never produced. It is claimed that the money he earned from the project enabled him to write The Visions of Simone Machard, Schweik in the Second World War and an adaptation of Webster's The Duchess of Malfi. He left the United States shortly after testifying before the House Un-American Activities Committee. John Wexley received sole credit for writing the screenplay after giving evidence to the Writers Guild that Brecht and Lang had only worked on the story. However, it seems that there is more Brecht in the script than is commonly accepted: the academic Gerd Gemünden writes that he spoke to Maurice Rapf, the judge on the case, who told him "it was obvious to the jury that Brecht and not Wexley was the main author, and that Wexley furthermore had a reputation as a credit stealer. It was only because of the fact that only written evidence was admissible, and since only Wexley's name appeared on all drafts, the jury had to rule in his favor." Wexley himself was blacklisted after he was named a communist in HUAC hearings.

Hangmen Also Die had a world premiere in Prague, Oklahoma on 27 March, an event which featured Adolf Hitler, Hirohito and Mussolini being hanged in effigy on Main Street. The mayors of Washington, Kansas, and London and Moscow, Texas attended. The film opened nationwide in the first days of April, beginning with 20 key cities.

== Music ==
The music for Hangmen Also Die was composed by Hanns Eisler, Brecht's collaborator on a number of plays with music, and earned a nomination for a Best Score Academy Award. Eisler only worked on a small number of American films, the most notable of which are Deadline at Dawn (1946) and None But the Lonely Heart (1944), for which he was also nominated for an Academy Award.

The song "No Surrender" in Hangmen was written by Eisler with lyrics by Sam Coslow.

== Reception ==
Variety review in 1942: "Story continuity is fine and absorbing throughout, but essentially it’s the incisive terms of the message propounded that sets Hangmen apart and points up the fact that propaganda can be art." Writing for The Nation in 1943, critic James Agee states that Lang and Brecht "have chosen to use brutality, American gangster idiom, and Middle High German cinematic style to get it across, and it is rich with clever melodrama, over-maestoso directional touches, and the sort of Querschnitt sophistication for detail which Lang always has ... the Nazis are also archaic, nicely presented types: the swaggering homosexual, the cannonball-headed plainclothesman, the tittering, torturing androgyne ... They are all conceivable, as Nazis; but they are all old-fashioned. The New Order has produced men of a new kind, and it would be more to the point to show some of them."

British critic Leslie Halliwell wrote, "Disappointingly heavy-handed, though deeply felt war propaganda set in Hollywood's idea of Czechoslovakia. Only moments of interest remain."

== Awards ==
Hangmen Also Die was nominated for two Academy Awards, for Hanns Eisler for "Best Music, Scoring of a Dramatic or Comedy Picture", and for Jack Whitney of Sound Services Inc. for "Best Sound, Recording". The movie is rated at 88% on Rotten Tomatoes.

== See also ==
- Lidice massacre
- Dramatic portrayals of Reinhard Heydrich
- Operation Anthropoid
- List of American films of 1943

Other films on this subject:

- Hitler's Madman (1943)
- The Silent Village (1943)
- Atentát (1964)
- Operation Daybreak (1975)
- Anthropoid (2016)
- The Man with the Iron Heart (2016)
