= Jan Kubis =

Jan Kubis may refer to:

- Jan Kubiš (1913-1942), Czech soldier and assassin of Reinhard Heydrich
- Ján Kubiš (born 1952), Slovak diplomat
