= Hitler's Madman =

1943 film

- Hitler's Madman insert poster.
- Directed by: Douglas Sirk
- Screenplay by: Peretz Hirschbein; Melvin Levy; Doris Malloy
- Story by: Emil Ludwig; Albrecht Joseph
- Based on: "Hangman's Village" by Bart Lytton
- Produced by: Seymour Nebenzal
- Starring: Patricia Morison; John Carradine; Alan Curtis
- Cinematography: Jack Greenhalgh; Eugen Schüfftan (credited as Technical Director)
- Edited by: Dan Milner
- Music by: Karl Hajos; Erich Zeisl (uncredited)
- Production companies: PRC; Angelus Pictures; Metro-Goldwyn-Mayer
- Distributed by: Loew's Inc.
- Release date: August 27, 1943
- Running time: 84 minutes
- Country: United States
- Language: English

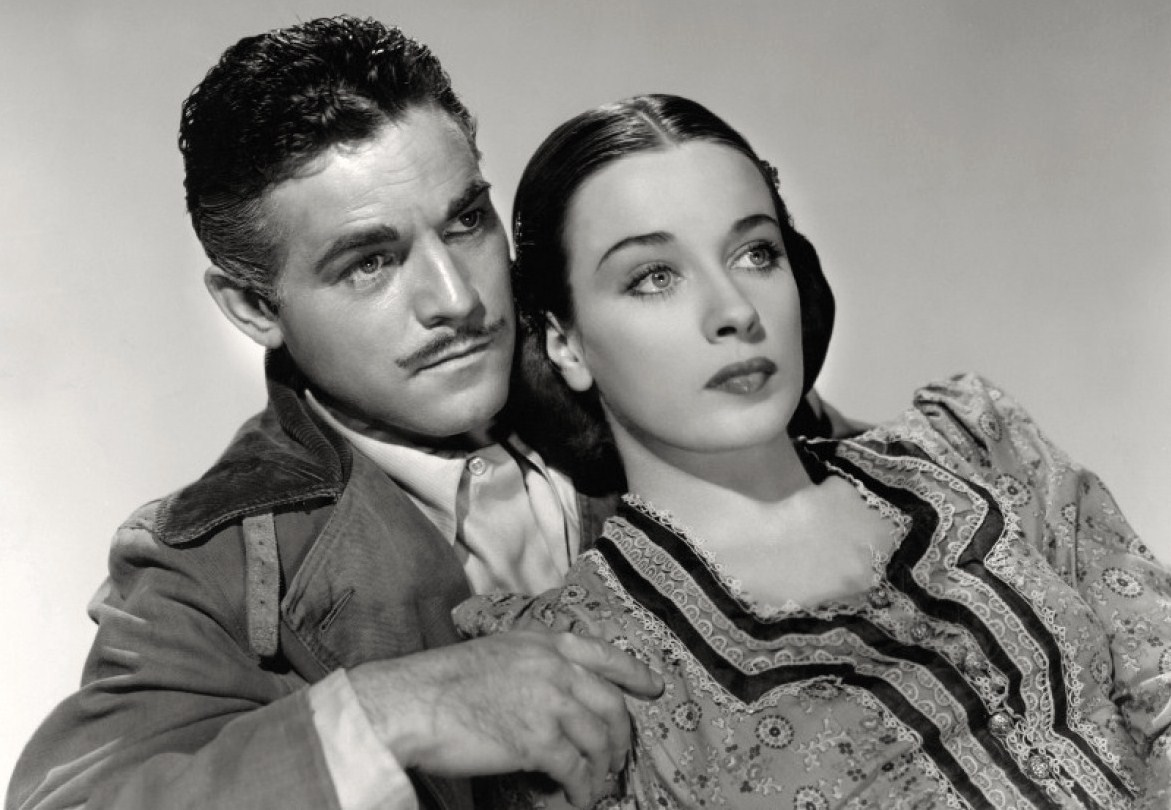
Alan Curtis and Patricia Morison

Hitler's Madman is a 1943 World War II drama directed by Douglas Sirk. It is a fictionalized account of the 1942 assassination of Nazi official Reinhard Heydrich and the resulting Lidice massacre, which the Germans committed as revenge. The film stars Patricia Morison and Alan Curtis and features John Carradine as Reinhard Heydrich. The screenplay was written by Peretz Hirschbein, Melvin Levy, and Doris Malloy, from a story by Bart Lytton, with some uncredited contributions by Edgar G. Ulmer.

Sirk intended the film to function more as a documentary, but after Louis B. Mayer acquired the film in February 1943, he insisted on reshoots to increase the drama. According to TCM, "Added material included Heydrich's deathbed scene with 'Himmler' and university scenes featuring M-G-M starlets, including Ava Gardner."

Hitler's Madman was Sirk's first American production after fleeing Nazi Germany and abandoning his German name of Detlef Sierck. He claimed to have met Heydrich at a party in the 1930s.

== Plot ==
Lidice, Czechoslovakia, 1942 – The opening verses of Edna St. Vincent Millay’s poem The Murder of Lidice are recited over images of the bucolic Czech village.

Villager Jan Hanka watches a British plane fly overhead, carrying Karel Vavra, a Czech paratrooper being dropped over his hometown to form resistance cells. Karel goes to the Hanka house, in search of daughter Jarmilla, his girlfriend since childhood. Mrs. Hanka asks Karel to take refuge in the forest. Jarmilla finds him there later. They profess their undying love and she sends him to a cave, where he discovers local vagabond, Nepomuk, who agrees to help.

Nepomuk gathers villagers at the cave. Karel asks them to sabotage the German war effort. Jan, the most respected villager, warns them it’s too dangerous. They sheepishly depart.

In Prague, the fearsome SS Reichsprotektor Reinhard Heydrich decides to start executing intellectuals, who he believes organize the resistance. He interrupts a university class attended by villager Klara and arrests the teacher and students. The male students are sent as cannon fodder on the Russian Front. The women are inspected for use as sex slaves in brothels for German soldiers. Klara throws herself from a window to her death, to avoid this fate.

Having lost his daughter Klara, Villager Janek dynamites the coal mine, to deny its product to the Germans. Jan catches his daughter teaching children the Czech national anthem, even though teaching is forbidden by the Germans. Jan argues she needs to be more careful. She calls him a coward.

The next day, Heydrich happens to drive through Lidice during the annual harvest blessing parade. Angered to find the road blocked, he plows through the parade and shoots the town priest, Father Cemlanek, horrifying the townsfolk.

Lidice Mayor Bauer, a German Nazi true-believer, prepares with his wife for the arrival of their two sons, on leave from the Russian Front. Heydrich’s adjutant tells Bauer the Reichsprotektor was displeased by the parade blocking his route and expects no impediments when he drives through the next morning. A telegram arrives, telling the Bauers their boys are both dead. Bauer accepts it as the price the Führer demands, but Mrs. Bauer is sickened and blames Hitler for their death. She goes to the church and sees Jan. Disgusted with the Nazis, Frau Bauer tells Jan what time Heydrich will drive through town tomorrow.

Jan, Karel, Jarmilla and Nepomuk ambush Heydrich’s limousine the next morning, as it approaches the town. Jarmilla creates a distraction, as the men fire machine guns and throw a grenade. They leave thinking they killed him, but he is only gravely wounded. Jan sends Karel and Jarmilla off to hide in the forest, blessing their future marriage.

The Nazi authorities in Prague, desperate to find Heydrich’s assailants, decide to take hostages among local villagers. Jan Hanka gets locked up in the town jail as a hostage. The SS arrests Mayor Bauer for failing to stop the ambush on Heydrich. Bauer protests as they drag him off that he’s a loyal Nazi. Jarmilla and Karel are chased by Germans in the forest. Jarmilla gets shot and dies in Karel’s arms.

In Prague, Heydrich lies near death. His superior, Heinrich Himmler, arrives from Berlin and watches Heydrich die, in agony, saying that the war is lost, and that he “should have killed them all.” After he dies, Himmler tells Hitler and that Heydrich died declaring “Victory will be ours, Heil Hitler!”

Himmler orders the village of Lidice eradicated. “They won't say Himmler is too weak.”

The troops herd the inhabitants into the square. All men over 16 will be shot. All women will go to concentration camps. All children will be placed in correctional institutions. As the Germans line machine guns in front of the men, one man starts singing the Czech national anthem. The others join in. The Germans shoot them all. Jan, forgotten in his jail cell, watches as the Germans set fire to the town, then fire artillery onto it, burying Jan within the rubble.

The ghostly men of Lidice file past the camera, reciting the final lines of Millay’s poem, warning viewers to act. The sun illumines the halo of the statue of the sorrowful saint.

== Cast ==
- Patricia Morison as Jarmilla Hanka
- John Carradine as Reinhard Heydrich
- Alan Curtis as Karel Vavra
- Howard Freeman as Heinrich Himmler
- Ralph Morgan as Jan Hanka
- Edgar Kennedy as Nepomuk
- Ludwig Stössel as Herman Bauer
- Al Shean as Father Cemlanek
- Elizabeth Russell as Maria Bartonek
- Jimmy Conlin as Dvorak
- Louis V. Arco (uncredited) as German Sergeant
- Richard Ryen (uncredited) as Gestapo
- Ava Gardner (uncredited) as Franciska Pritric
- Lester Dorr (uncredited) as Sergeant
- Wolfgang Zilzer SS Colonel (uncredited)
- Hans Heinrich von Twardowski Lt. Buelow (uncredited)

== Production ==
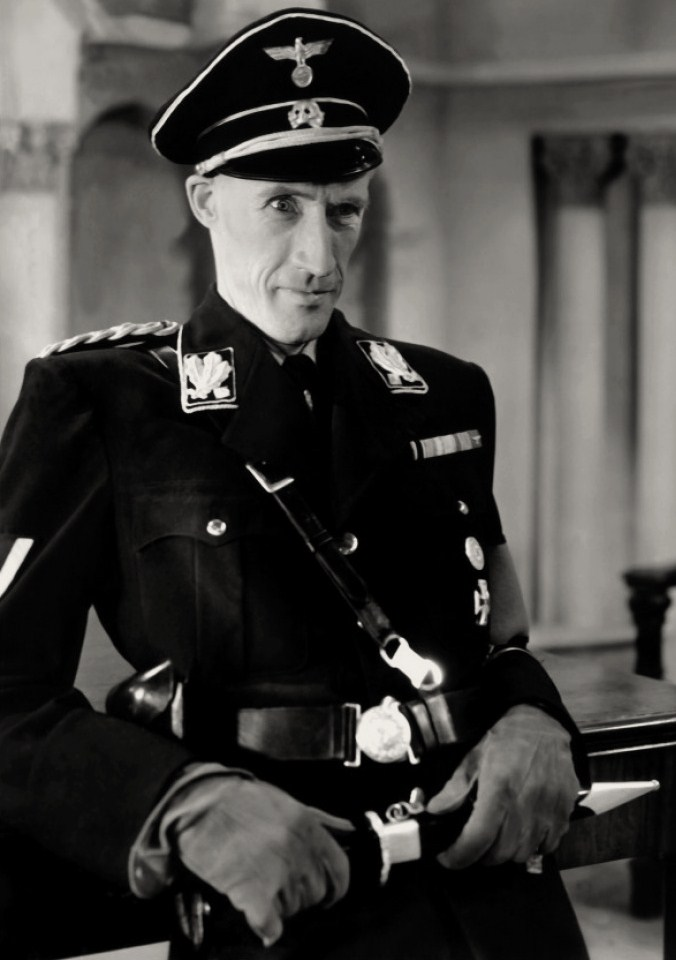
John Carradine as SS-Gruppenführer Reinhard Heydrich

The film was produced independently by Seymour Nebenzal under the auspices of the Producers Releasing Corporation, a "Poverty Row" studio, and filmed in one week in November 1942, under the title of Hitler's Hangman. The title was changed to Hitler's Madman to avoid confusion with Fritz Lang's similarly themed Hangmen Also Die!.

Sirk hired German cinematographer Eugen Schüfftan to shoot the film, but because Schüfftan was not allowed to work in the United States at the time, the cinematography credit was given to Jack Greenhalgh and Schüfftan was credited as "Technical Director." The film opens and closes with Edna St. Vincent Millay's 1942 poem, "The Murder of Lidice".

Sirk directed reshoots at MGM's own studios in May 1943, consisting of the inspection of the female university students and Klara's resulting suicide (during which an uncredited Ava Gardner appears), Heydrich's death scenes, and the shooting of the male residents of Lidice.

== Release ==
The film was originally set to be released through Republic Pictures. However, when it was completed, Nebenzal arranged a screening for MGM chief Louis B. Mayer, who bought it, making it one of the few, and possibly the first, film to be distributed by MGM even though it was originally produced by another company.

== See also ==
- Assassination of Reinhard Heydrich
- Operation Anthropoid
- Operation Anthropoid Memorial
- Dramatic portrayals of Reinhard Heydrich
- List of American films of 1943

Other films on the same subject:

- Hangmen Also Die! (1943)
- The Silent Village (1943)
- Atentát (1964)
- Operation Daybreak (1975)
- Lidice (2011) (aka Fall of the Innocent in the UK; aka Butcher of Prague in US)
- Anthropoid (2016)
- The Man with the Iron Heart (2016)
