= The Capture (film) =

1950 film by John Sturges

- Theatrical release poster
- Directed by: John Sturges
- Written by: Niven Busch
- Produced by: Niven Busch
- Starring: Lew Ayres; Teresa Wright
- Cinematography: Edward Cronjager
- Edited by: George Amy
- Music by: Daniele Amfitheatrof
- Color process: Black and white
- Production company: Niven Busch Productions
- Distributed by: RKO Radio Pictures
- Release date: April 8, 1950 (US)
- Running time: 90 minutes
- Country: United States
- Language: English

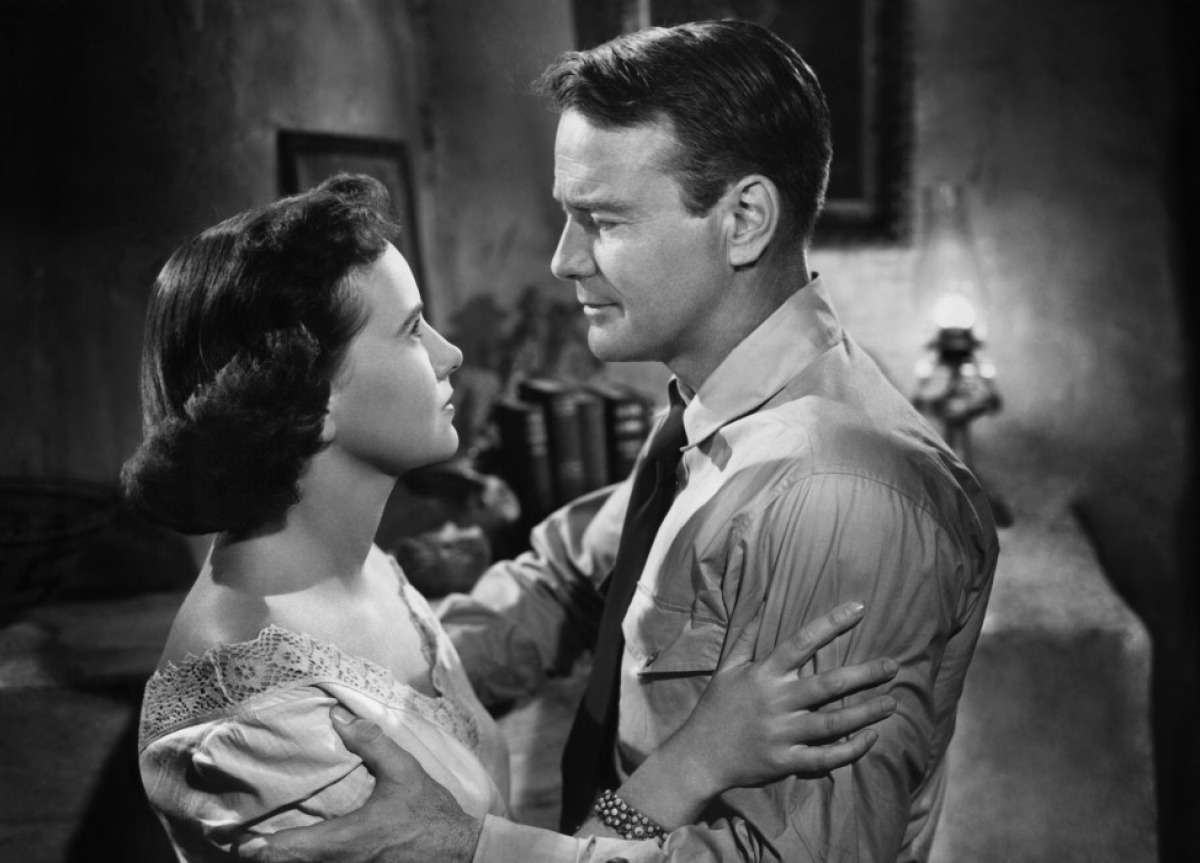
Teresa Wright and Lew Ayres

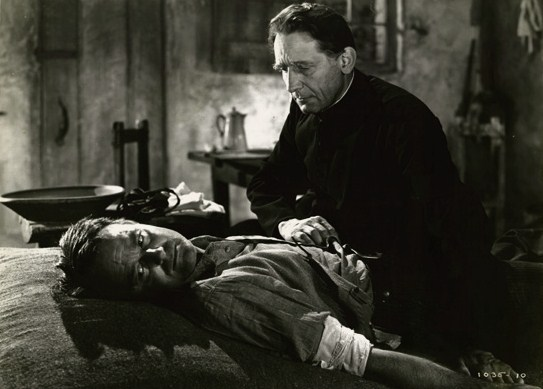
Lew Ayres and Victor Jory

The Capture is a 1950 American Western film directed by John Sturges and starring Lew Ayres and Teresa Wright. The story, originally titled Daybreak, was written by Niven Busch, Wright's husband.

The story, told in flashback form, deals with a former oil worker driven by guilt at causing the death of an innocent man.

== Plot ==
Lin Vanner is the manager of an oil company and the payroll has been stolen in a holdup. His fiancée urges him to pursue the suspect in hope that he will gain recognition. Following the thief's most likely trail over the border with Mexico, he begins his pursuit. Lin shoots a man who shouts back at him and does not raise his hands when challenged.

Lin learns that the man whom he had shot could not raise one arm because it was injured, which was the reason that he had shouted rather than complying with the demand he raise his hands, and he was not the robbery suspect. Troubled by his action and abandoned by his fiancée, Lin seeks to inform the dead man's widow Ellen, but he is mistaken for an applicant for a job to operate the dead man's farm until Ellen's son is old enough to take command. Lin believes that this opportunity has been given to him to make amends for his mistake.

With Father Gomez at his side, the story that he is being pursued by the police for another killing is told in a flashback.

== Cast ==
- Lew Ayres as Lin Vanner
- Teresa Wright as Ellen
- Victor Jory as Father Gomez
- Jacqueline White as Luana Ware
- Jimmy Hunt as Ellen's son
- Barry Kelley as Earl C. Mahoney
- Duncan Renaldo as Carlos
- William Bakewell as Tolin
- Milton Parsons as Thin Man
- Frank Matts as Juan
- Felipe Turich as Valdez
- Edwin Rand as Sam Tevlin

== Release ==
Teresa Wright, who reportedly lost her contract with Samuel Goldwyn for refusing to make publicity appearances, embarked on a 23-city tour to promote The Capture.

== Reception ==
In a contemporary review for the Los Angeles Times, critic Edwin Schallert wrote:

"The Capture'' is a strange brooding story of manhunt and a man's conscience, with a peculiar fascination. ... The two leading characters are in conflict—and in love— which causes them to have a remote resemblance to Gregory Peck and Jennifer Jones in "Duel in the Sun." Like its predecessor authored by Busch, this new production, strangely, powerfully and sometimes erratically mingles the motifs of romance and hate, while it deals with a vaguer issue of retribution and its effect on the central male figure in its plot. Put this altogether [sic] and you have a feature that is, at least, arresting and different, and that may be recommended on that account. However, it has the fault that it sometimes carries less conviction than it should have. ... The ending is what lets the picture down, because it doesn't seem a practical solution. Ayres, with apparent evidence to free him from a murder charge, in wild desperation starts to shoot it out with Mexican police who are stalking him and then surrenders. A kind of miracle has happened to bring this about. When the law takes over you are not too sure of his fate.

Reviewing the film for The New York Times, critic Howard H. Thompson wrote: "At least the clean-cut title of ... 'The Capture' is on the credit side. So are some quietly effective Mexican backgrounds. That's about it. The first independent production of Niven Busch, a man who has a way with a typewriter, is a static, pretentious little Western, full of high-sounding talk, short on action and signifying exactly nothing. But it tries hard."

Variety offered a generally favorable review, writing: "The Capture is an offbeat drama, with psychological overtones, that plays off against the raw and rugged background of Mexican locales. Picture kicks off with a wallop ... Ayres and Teresa Wright are very capable in the lead characters, adding to the general realism given the story because of the locales used. One of the interesting touches to the film is the incidental native music hauntingly spotted with the appearance of a blind guitar player."

== See also ==
- List of films in the public domain in the United States
