= The Big Shakedown =

1934 film by John Francis Dillon

- Theatrical release poster
- Directed by: John Francis Dillon
- Written by: Niven Busch; Rian James
- Produced by: Samuel Bischoff
- Starring: Charles Farrell; Bette Davis; Ricardo Cortez; Glenda Farrell
- Cinematography: Sidney Hickox
- Music by: Leo F. Forbstein
- Distributed by: Warner Bros. Pictures
- Release date: January 6, 1934
- Running time: 64 minutes
- Country: United States
- Language: English

The Big Shakedown is a 1934 American pre-Code crime drama film starring Charles Farrell and Bette Davis, and directed by John Francis Dillon. The screenplay is based on the story "Cut Rate" by Niven Busch and Samuel G. Engel. The film also stars Ricardo Cortez and Glenda Farrell and was director Dillon's final film.

== Plot ==
Jimmy Morrell and Norma Nelson who plan to wed as soon as their neighborhood pharmacy begins to show a profit. The opportunity arises when former bootlegger Dutch Barnes offers Jimmy a job duplicating name brand toothpaste and cosmetics that can be made cheaply and then sold in the bottles and jars of reputable pharmaceutical companies at regular prices. When Dutch asks him to copy the formula for a popular brand of antiseptic, Jimmy refuses, claiming he is unable to get a key ingredient, but when Dutch offers him a bonus hefty enough to allow Jimmy to marry Norma, he agrees.

Dutch's ex-girlfriend Lily Duran, jealous over his attentions to another woman, notifies the antiseptic company about the deception, and is murdered by Dutch. Without their key witness, the company is forced to drop their lawsuit against Jimmy. Now beholden to Dutch, he is forced to make fake digitalis. Norma is given some of the drug during childbirth, causing her to lose the baby.

Jimmy seeks vengeance against Dutch, but Sheffner, who formulated the antiseptic Jimmy manufactured, shoots Dutch. Jimmy confesses everything to the district attorney and is exonerated, allowing him and Norma to return to life as they once knew it.

== Cast ==
- Charles Farrell as Jimmy Morrell
- Bette Davis as Norma Nelson
- Ricardo Cortez as Dutch Barnes
- Glenda Farrell as Lily Duran
- Allen Jenkins as Lefty
- Henry O'Neill as Sheffner
- Dewey Robinson as Slim
- John Wray as Higgins
- Adrian Morris as Trigger

== Reception ==
The New York Times said, "[The picture's] particular virtue . . . is that it is specific and believable in its description of the felonious behavior involved in the racket. Thus it maintains a moderate sum of interest and excitement in the face of a routine assortment of gang-film impedimenta." TV Guide calls it an "overblown crime melodrama" and adds, "the material stretches believability at every plot turn."
