= Ďáblice Cemetery =

Cemetery in Prague, Czech Republic

- Ďáblický hřbitov
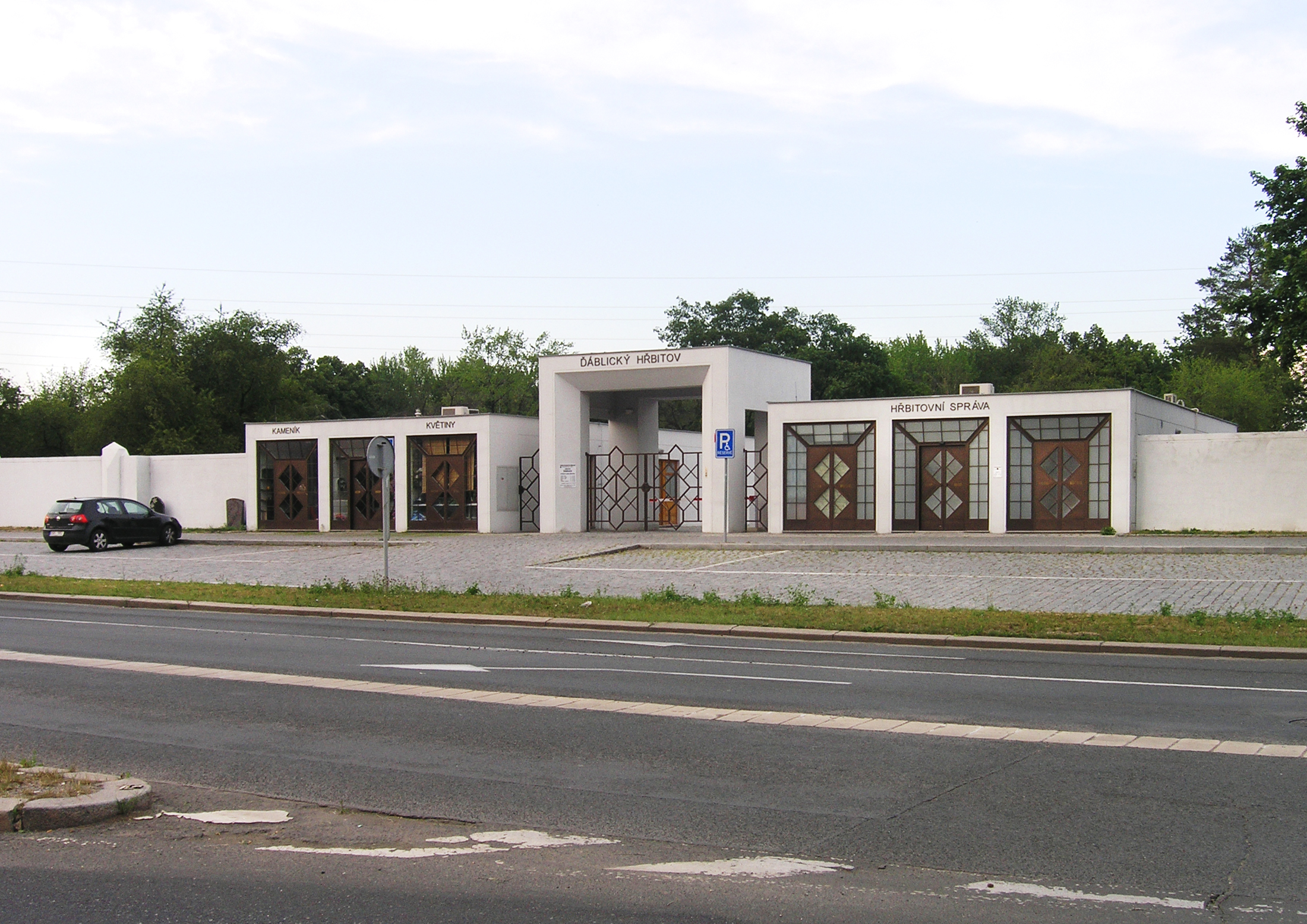
- Gate of the cemetery

Details
- Established: 1914
- Location: Prague
- Country: Czech Republic
- Coordinates: 50°8′9″N 14°28′49″E
- Type: Public
- Size: Over 29 hectares (72 acres)
- No. of graves: 20,000

Ďáblice Cemetery (Czech: Ďáblický hřbitov) is a graveyard in Prague, Czech Republic. It is located in the Ďáblice municipal district in Prague 8, in the northern part of Prague. It is the second largest cemetery in Prague by area.

== History and description ==
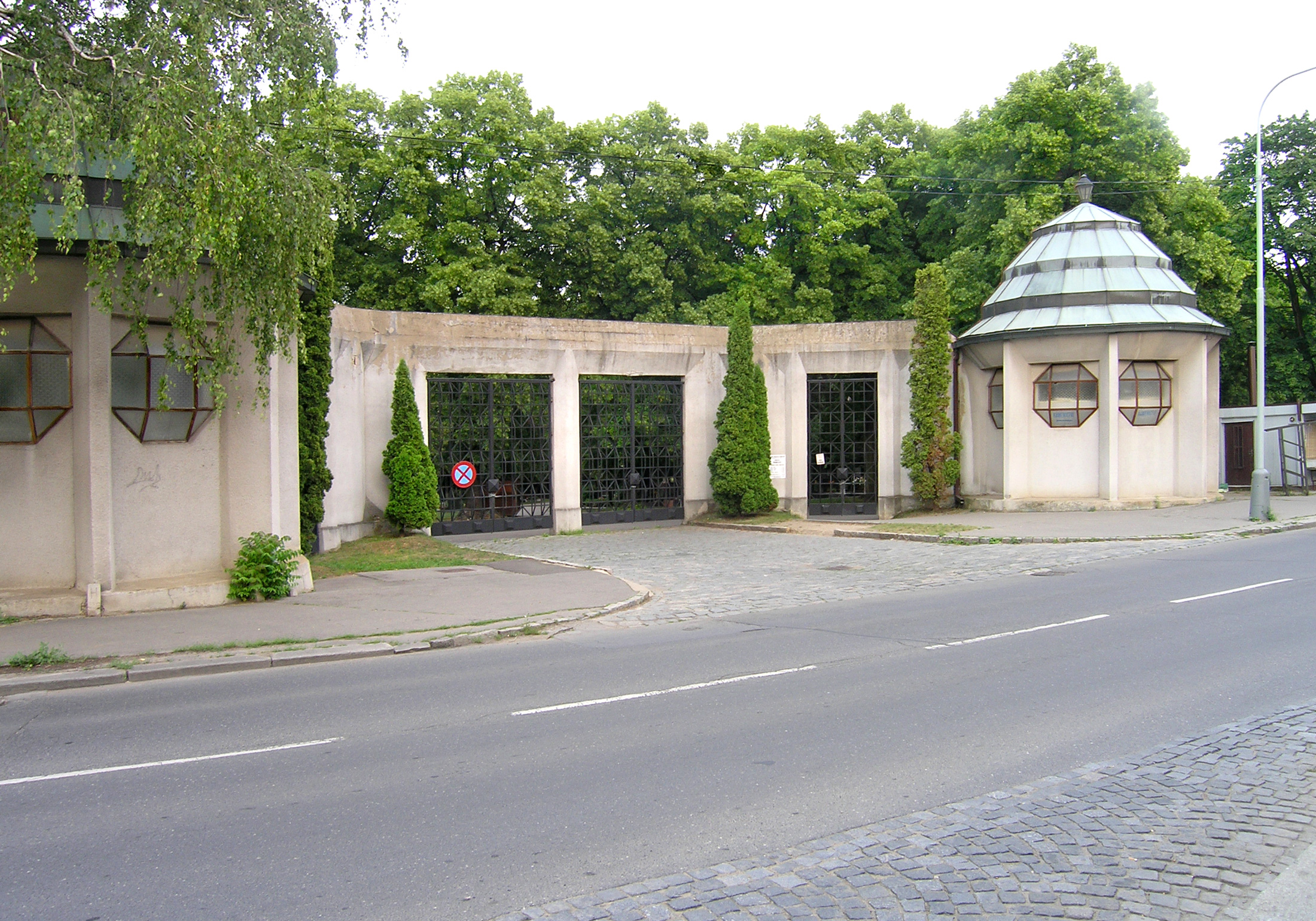
Cubist pavilions built by Hofman

The cemetery was founded in 1912 as Prague's central burial place and built in 1912–1914. It has an area of more than 29 ha (72 acres), making it the second largest cemetery in Prague by area after Olšany Cemetery. The entrance pavilions were designed in the Cubist style by Vlastislav Hofman.

Over 20,000 registered graves are located here. In addition to regular graves, there are about 70 mass graves containing bodies of over 14,000 people in total.

The cemetery area is both a valuable architectural monument and a historical monument. There is intention to declare a part of the cemetery a national cultural monument. This initiative is hampered by the objection that, apart from thousands of the victims of Nazism and hundreds of the victims of communism, the mass graves also contain thousands of bodies or body parts of unknown people who died in Prague hospitals and were subsequently used for pathological or academic autopsies.

== Notable interments ==
Since 1943, Czech people executed by Nazis or killed while fighting Nazis were buried there. The Ďáblice Cemetery is known as the resting place of the resistance fighters of World War II, and at the same time there is an unmarked grave with several war criminals executed after trials after World War II. Notable people buried at Ďáblice Cemetery include:

- Andrea Absolonová (1976–2004), diver and pornographic actress
- Alfréd Bartoš (1916–1942), army officer and war hero
- Kamil Bednář (1912–1972), poet, translator and writer
- Karel Čurda (1911–1947), army officer and Nazi collaborator
- Kurt Daluege (1897–1946), German Nazi war criminal
- Karl Hermann Frank (1898–1946), German Nazi war criminal
- Jozef Gabčík (1912–1942), Slovak soldier and war hero
- Gerhard Gentzen (1909–1945), German mathematician
- Jan Kubiš (1913–1942), soldier and war hero
- Václav Morávek (1904–1942), army officer and war hero
- Adolf Opálka (1915–1942), army officer and war hero
- Josef Valčík (1914–1942), army officer and war hero
