= Niven Busch =

American novelist and screenwriter (1903–1991)

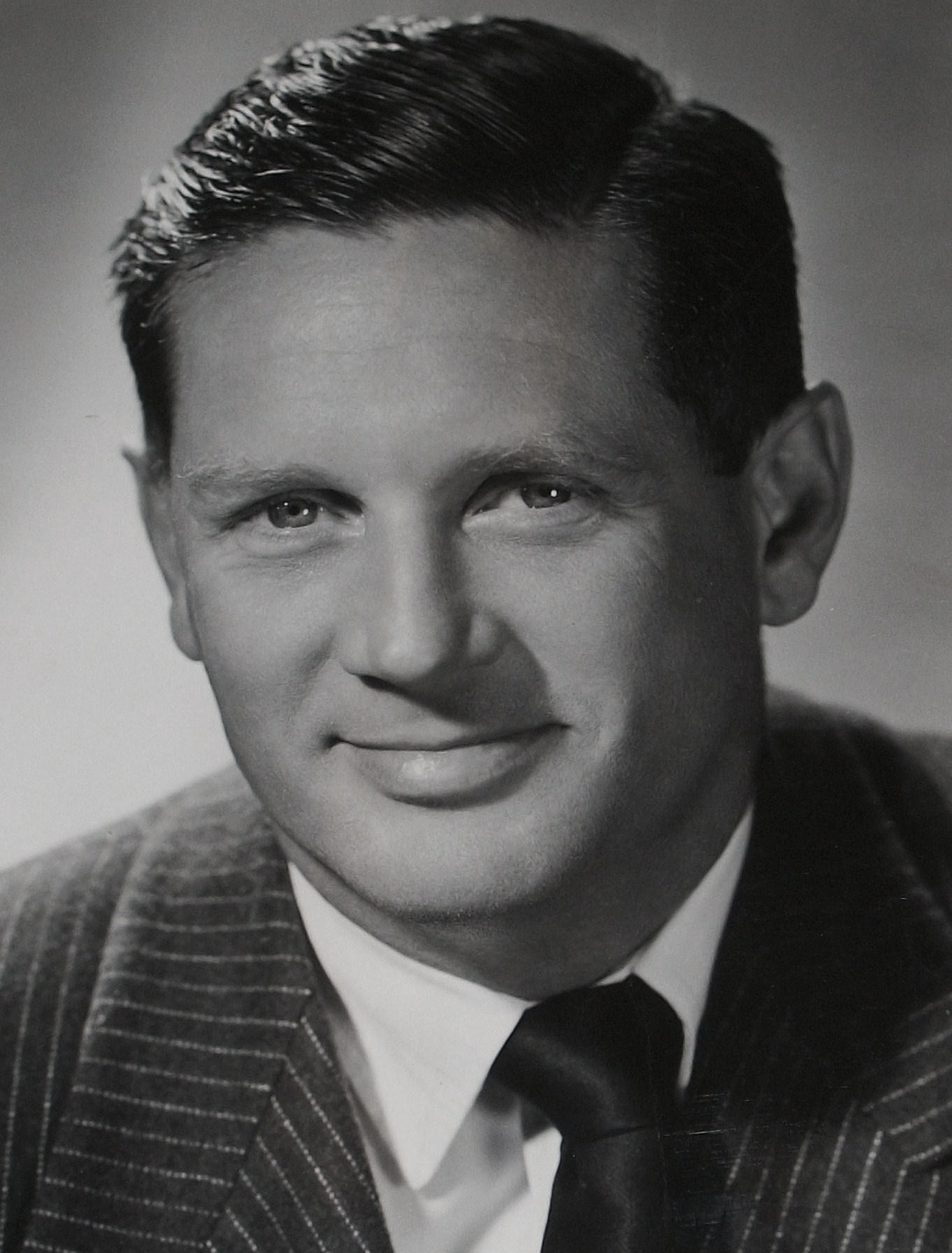
- Busch in 1944
- Born: April 26, 1903; New York City, U.S.
- Died: August 25, 1991 (aged 88); San Francisco, California, U.S.
- Resting place: Cypress Lawn Memorial Park, Colma, California
- Occupations: Novelist, screenwriter
- Years active: 1932–1968
- Spouses: Sofija Freijs (m. 1928; div. 1934) Phyllis Cooper (m. 1936; div. 1940) Teresa Wright (m. 1942; div. 1952) Carmencita Baker (m. 1956; div. 1968) Suzanne de Sanz (m. 1974)
- Children: 3

Niven Busch (April 26, 1903 – August 25, 1991) was an American novelist and screenwriter of movies such as the acclaimed The Postman Always Rings Twice. His novels included Duel in the Sun (1944) and California Street (1959). He was married to actress Teresa Wright for ten years beginning in 1942.

== Early career ==
Born in New York City, he graduated from Hoosac School and matriculated at Princeton University. Busch left Princeton in 1924 to join the staff of Time (the magazine was co-founded by Busch's cousin, Briton Hadden). Before departing for Hollywood a decade later, Busch had risen to editor at the weekly, working simultaneously for The New Yorker, where he contributed profiles on famous Americans. (These articles were collected into his first book, the non-fiction Twenty-One Americans.)

In 1932, realizing he had gone as far as he was likely to go as a New York-based magazine writer/editor, Busch re-connected with agent Myron Selznick, whom Busch knew through his father, an executive who had worked for Myron's father Lewis in the teens and early twenties.

Myron Selznick soon secured work for Busch at Warner Bros. Pictures, and Busch decamped to Los Angeles to write his first film, Howard Hawks's The Crowd Roars. One of four writers on the production, Busch's name was misspelled in the credits.

== Film career ==
Through the rest of the thirties, Busch worked for most of the major Hollywood studios, scripting mostly B-movies like The Big Shakedown. In 1938 he was nominated for an Academy Award for In Old Chicago, which was based on his story We the O'Learys, but failed to win. In 1940 he co-wrote The Westerner for director William Wyler and producer Samuel Goldwyn. Soon thereafter he went to work as Goldwyn's story editor, recommending Pride of the Yankees, in which Gary Cooper and Busch's soon-to-be wife Teresa Wright co-starred.

Settling in the hills of Encino with his growing family, Busch began writing novels. The Carrington Incident, published in 1941, was followed by the best-seller Duel in the Sun, which Lewis Selznick's other son David purchased and turned into the 1946 blockbuster of the same title. He now alternated between the writing of screenplays and novels, most of which became best-sellers. They Dream of Home, a tale of returning veterans, was followed by The Furies (1950), which became a film that starred Barbara Stanwyck.

Another notable film of the period — for which Busch wrote the original screenplay — was Pursued starring Robert Mitchum and Teresa Wright, one of the first psychological Westerns with "noir" overtones. Around the same time, Busch also adapted the noir thriller The Postman Always Rings Twice (1946), for Metro-Goldwyn-Mayer.

== Later career ==
In the early fifties, Busch and Wright divorced, and Busch left Hollywood for northern California, where he devoted himself to cattle ranching and the full-time writing of novels. There he would meet his fourth wife Carmencita Baker and fifth wife Suzanne de Sanz.

Before Busch's final novel The Titan Game he had become one of San Francisco's leading literary lights and a Regent's Professor at the University of California. California Street is about the San Francisco newspaper publishing business, with the title taken from California Street in the city.

Busch appears in the film The Unbearable Lightness of Being, playing the role of "Old Man" in the scene in which Sabina (Lena Olin) receives the letter informing her of Tómas and Tereza's deaths. Busch was 84 at the time of the filming.

Busch died from congestive heart failure in 1991 at the age of eighty-eight.

== Novels ==
- The Carrington Incident (1941)
- Duel in the Sun (1944)
- They Dream of Home (1944)
- Day of the Conquerors (1946)
- The Furies (1948)
- The Capture (1950)
- The Hate Merchant (1953)
- The Actor (1955)
- California Street: A Novel (1959)
- The San Franciscans (1962)
- The Gentleman From California (1965) (fictionalized Richard Nixon)
- The Takeover (1973)
- No Place for a Hero (1980) (historical work about John C. Fremont in California)
- Continent's Edge (1980)
- The Titan Game (1989) (final novel)

== Stories ==
- "College Coach" (1933)
- "Cut Rate" (1934)
- "We the O'Learys" (1936)
- "Belle Star" (1941)
- "Distant Drums" (1951)
- "The Man from the Alamo" (1953)

== Filmography ==
As screenwriter unless otherwise noted.

- The Crowd Roars (1932)
- Scarlet Dawn (1932)
- Miss Pinkerton (1932)
- College Coach (1933) (also story "College Coach")
- Babbitt (1934)
- The Man with Two Faces (1934)
- The Big Shakedown (1934) (also story "Cut Rate")
- He Was Her Man (1934)
- Lady Tubbs (1935) (unconfirmed)
- Three Kids and a Queen (1935) (uncredited)
- In Old Chicago (1937) (story "We the O'Learys")
- Off the Record (1939)
- The Angels Wash Their Faces (1939)
- The Westerner (1940)
- Belle Starr (1941) (story "Belle Starr")
- The Postman Always Rings Twice (1946)
- Till the End of Time (1946) (novel They Dream of Home)
- Duel in the Sun (1946) (suggested by the novel Duel in the Sun)
- Pursued (1947)
- Moss Rose (1947)
- The Capture (1950) (also uncredited novel and producer)
- The Furies (1950) (novel)
- Distant Drums (1951) (also story "Distant Drums")
- The Man from the Alamo (1953) (story "The Man from the Alamo")
- The Moonlighter (1953) (also story)
- The Treasure of Pancho Villa (1955)
- Gigi (1958) (uncredited)
- The Wild Cat (1962) (uncredited, novel Duel in the Sun)

=== Actor ===
- The Unbearable Lightness of Being (1988)

== Research resources ==
- Niven Busch's California Street Papers, 1955-59 (0.5 linear ft.) are housed in the Department of Special Collections and University Archives at Stanford University Libraries
- Niven Busch's The Gentleman from California Papers, 1964-66 (1 linear ft.) are housed in the Department of Special Collections and University Archives at Stanford University Libraries
- Niven Busch's The San Franciscans Papers, 1959-1962 (0.5 linear ft.) are housed in the Department of Special Collections and University Archives at Stanford University Libraries
- Niven Busch Papers are archived at the American Heritage Center, University of Wyoming.
