= The Furies (1950 film) =

American Western by Anthony Mann

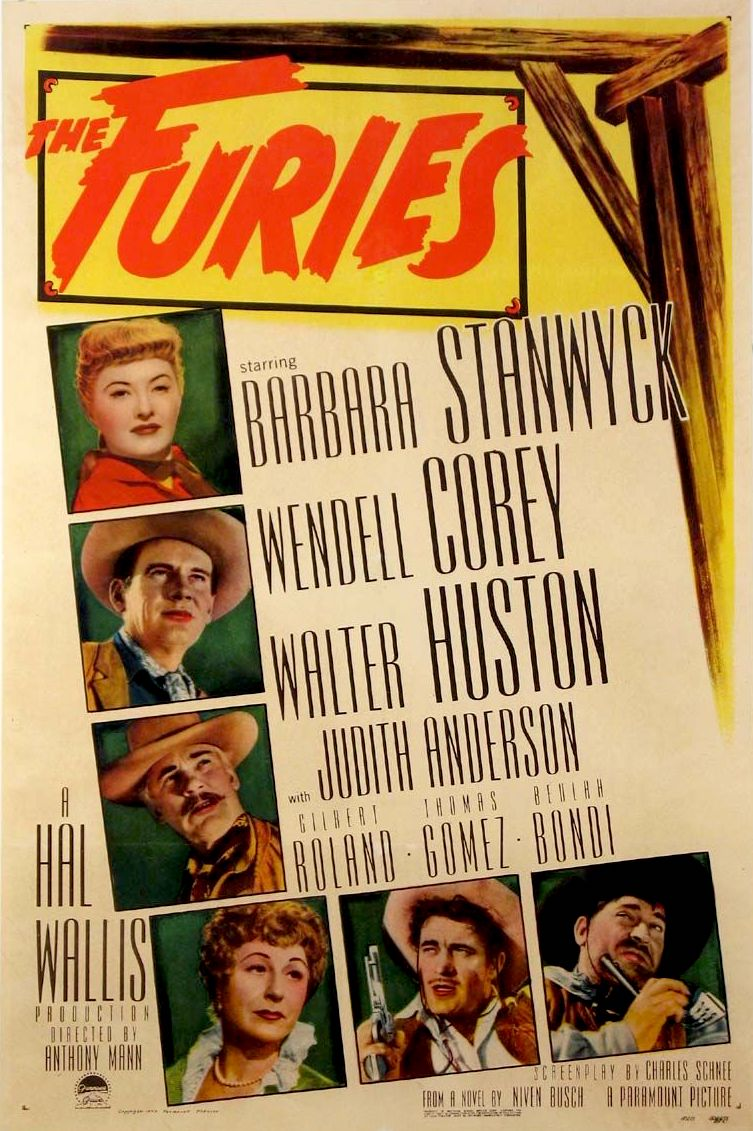
- Theatrical poster
- Directed by: Anthony Mann
- Screenplay by: Charles Schnee
- Based on: The Furies by Niven Busch
- Produced by: Hal Wallis
- Starring: Barbara Stanwyck; Wendell Corey; Walter Huston
- Cinematography: Victor Milner
- Edited by: Archie Marshek
- Music by: Franz Waxman
- Color process: Black and white
- Production company: Hal Wallis Productions
- Distributed by: Paramount Pictures
- Release date: July 21, 1950 (Tucson)
- Running time: 109 minutes
- Country: United States
- Languages: English; Spanish
- Box office: $1.5 million

The Furies is a 1950 American Western film directed by Anthony Mann and starring Barbara Stanwyck, Wendell Corey and Walter Huston in his final film performance. Based on the 1948 Niven Busch novel of the same name, its plot follows the ruthless daughter of a tyrannical rancher in 1870s New Mexico Territory who struggles with her stake in his estate.

Released in August 1950 by Paramount Pictures, the film was a financial failure but would gain a reputation as a "Freudian Western" and is recognized among Mann's greatest contributions to the genre.

== Plot ==
Temple Caddy "T. C." Jeffords is an elderly, tyrannical and arrogant cattle baron who owns a sprawling property in the New Mexico Territory called the Furies. He harbors special contempt for the Herrera family, who are squatting on the property. T. C.'s beloved daughter Vance is as obsessed with wealth and as ruthless as is her father, although she has a secret, close bond with Juan Herrera, whom she has known since childhood. However, Vance seeks a suitor who can run the giant ranch with her once her father dies. She falls in love with Rip Darrow, who believes that a portion of the Furies' land is rightfully his and holds a grudge against T. C. Vance is shocked when Rip accepts a $50,000 bribe from T. C. to stay out of her life. In town, Rip owns a saloon that he calls The Legal Tender, and he also opens a bank near it.

T. C. is so self-possessed that he pays bills with "T. C." notes rather than actual dollars. One day, he brings a woman home to the Furies, Flo Burnett, who plans to marry T. C. for his money. Confronted by Vance, Flo unabashedly admits that she is seeking the marriage for financial security and tells Vance that she and T. C. are soon to be married in San Francisco. Together, Flo and T. C. inform Vance that they have arranged for an outsider to take over the maintenance of the Furies in order to relieve pressure from Vance as well as to oust the Herreras from the property. They have also planned an extended trip to Europe for Vance. Enraged by this news, Vance hurls a pair of scissors at Flo's face, permanently disfiguring her.

Vance flees on horseback to the Herreras' home on the Furies. T. C. summons a number of his men to expel the Herreras from the property. They arrive on horseback armed with guns, but the Herreras hurl boulders down the hill at them and return fire. Vance stands by Juan's side as he fires at her father's associates. The Herreras eventually surrender, and T. C. and his men execute Juan by hanging as Vance watches. Before she departs, Vance proclaims her hatred for her father and swears to him that she will ruin his life.

Seeking vengeance, Vance travels throughout the American West, buying all of the "T. C." notes and dramatically eroding her father's wealth. At risk of losing his property, T. C. unsuccessfully seeks to borrow $50,000 from Flo to save the Furies. Meanwhile, Vance visits Rip, asking for assistance in her plot to ruin her father. Rip observes that Vance is consumed by hatred, but agrees to help her if she gives him a section of the Furies, and she agrees. They conspire to deceive T. C. by planting a false hope that a wealthy California investor will lend him the funds to save the Furies. When T. C. arrives at the bank to receive his loan, he is met by Vance and Rip and offered a crate of $140,000 of his own "T. C." notes, now worthless. Rather than lambasting his daughter, T. C. congratulates her on her cunning, and willingly relinquishes the Furies to her. He declares that he will begin his life anew elsewhere with the little means that he has left. T. C. exits the bank and burns his box of currency outside. As he walks down the street arm-in-arm with Vance and Rip, he is shot to death by Juan's bereaved mother. Vance and Rip return to the Furies with T. C.'s body and they plan his burial.

== Cast ==
- Barbara Stanwyck as Vance Jeffords
- Wendell Corey as Rip Darrow
- Walter Huston as T. C. Jeffords
- Judith Anderson as Flo Burnett
- Gilbert Roland as Juan Herrera
- Thomas Gomez as El Tigre
- Beulah Bondi as Mrs. Anaheim
- Albert Dekker as Mr. Reynolds
- John Bromfield as Clay Jeffords
- Wallace Ford as Scotty Hyslip
- Blanche Yurka as Herrera Mother
- Louis Jean Heydt as Bailey
- Frank Ferguson as Dr. Grieve
- Charles Evans as Old Anaheim
- Movita as Chiquita (as Movita Castaneda)
- Craig Kelly as Young Anaheim
- Myrna Dell as Dallas Hart

== Analysis ==
Film scholar Michael Adams observes that the film blends archetypes borrowed from Greek tragedies as well as several works by Shakespeare, specifically King Lear and Macbeth. In a 1957 interview, director Anthony Mann stated that he felt that the screenplay shared several similarities to the Fyodor Dostoevsky novel The Idiot.

== Production ==
=== Filming ===
Filming occurred primarily on location in Tucson, Arizona, beginning on November 9, 1949. Filming completed on December 23, 1949, although additional footage and retakes were filmed on January 7, 1950. Some interiors were shot at Paramount Studios in Los Angeles.

The film would be Walter Huston's final role before his death at the age of 66.

Director Anthony Mann said: "Of all the men I’ve ever worked with, Wallis is the best producer. He knows about film making, and has his own opinions. If he doesn’t agree with you, you have a helluva fight, but at least he knows what he’s trying for, and in this sense he’s very good. He’s an expert film maker. We had Walter Huston on it. He was a man who adored his profession. He was everything that one hopes an actor will be."

== Release ==
=== Box office ===
The Furies premiered in Tucson, Arizona on July 21, 1950, before screening nationally in August 1950. Although it grossed $1,550,000 million at the American box office, the film was considered a financial failure for Paramount.

=== Home media ===
The Criterion Collection released the film on DVD on November 21, 2008, billing it as a "hidden treasure of American filmmaking", and on Blu-ray disc on April 20, 2021.

== Reception ==
In a contemporary review for The New York Times, critic A. H. Weiler wrote: "Since Hal B. Wallis, who produced, and Charles Schnee, the scenarist of 'The Furies,' were of a mind to turn out a big or adult-type Western, they can be listed as having achieved their goal. For this tale ... is more a camera view of personalities than livestock, more fairly entertaining discourse than hard riding and rustlers. 'The Furies,' in short, has sacrificed speed and corn for a brand of drama usually set indoors. The results are interesting if not entirely exciting."

Niven Busch refused any involvement with the film after selling his novel to Hal Wallis. After viewing the film, he said:

I didn’t think it had the intensity that I wanted. I thought it was a good book, and I thought the story was as good as Pursued, really. It had that great character of the father. I thought Stanwyck should have been better directed. And I thought the outdoor sequences should have been much better handled... I thought Gilbert Roland was good. I thought the fight up in the Pinnacles was good. But Wendell Corey was very insipid. They needed a very vital guy for that.

The film has received critical acclaim from modern-day critics. The review aggregator Rotten Tomatoes reports that 90% of critics have offered positive reviews, based on 10 reviews, with an average score of 7.9/10.

The film was nominated for the Academy Award for Best Cinematography at the 23rd Academy Awards, but lost to The Third Man.
