= California Conquest =

1952 film

- Original film poster
- Directed by: Lew Landers
- Written by: Robert E. Kent
- Produced by: Sam Katzman
- Starring: Cornel Wilde; Teresa Wright
- Cinematography: Ellis W. Carter
- Edited by: Richard Fantl
- Color process: Technicolor
- Production company: Sam Katzman Productions
- Distributed by: Columbia Pictures
- Release date: June 6, 1952 (New York)
- Running time: 79 minutes
- Country: United States
- Language: English

California Conquest is a 1952 American Western film directed by Lew Landers and starring Cornel Wilde and Teresa Wright. The film is set in the early 1840s and its plot concerns a conspiracy by native Hidalgo Californios to deliver the Mexican territory of California to the Russian Empire.

== Plot ==
Don Arturo Bordega is a member of the old Spanish nobility and a vocal advocate for California's annexation by the United States. On his way to a secret meeting in support of that goal, he is attacked by bandits led by José Martínez but narrowly escapes. Martinez's bandits attempt to assassinate the guest of honor at the meeting, U.S. Army Captain John Charles Fremont, but he is only slightly wounded. At the meeting, Fremont reveals that the U.S. has no plans to annex California.

Brothers Ernesto and Fredo Brios have paid Martinez to violently oppose the movement supporting American annexation of California, hoping to deliver the territory to the Russian czar in exchange for a promise to appoint Ernesto, and later Fredo, as the colonial governor.

Martinez's men violently seize rifles from gunsmith Sam Lawrence in order to supply forces in the Russian conquest of California. This invokes the wrath of his beautiful daughter Julia, who joins Bordega in his mission to infiltrate Martinez's bandit group. Martinez is killed by Julia and Ernesto is slain by Bordega in a duel.

Bordega and Julia travel to Fort Ross, where they capture Fredo, Russian princess Helena de Gagarine and a high-ranking Russian army officer, thwarting the conspiracy. Bordega and Julia fall in love and intend to marry and start a large family.

== Cast ==
- Cornel Wilde as Don Arturo Bordega
- Teresa Wright as Julie Lawrence
- Alfonso Bedoya as José Martínez
- Lisa Ferraday as Helena de Gagarine
- Eugene Iglesias as Ernesto Brios
- John Dehner as Fredo Brios
- Ivan Lebedeff as Alexander Rotcheff
- Tito Renaldo as Don Bernardo Mirana
- Renzo Cesana as Fr. Lindos
- Baynes Barron as Igna'cio
- Rico Alaniz as Pedro
- William Wilkerson as Fernando
- Edward Colmans as Juan Junipero
- Alex Montoya as Juan

== Reception ==
In a contemporary review for The New York Times, critic Howard Thompson called the film "a hysterical and historical horse act" and wrote: "For all the scrambling, the inane dialogue and Lew Landers' heavy-handed direction allow small leeway for any authentic vigor or pacing. The random fencing scenes fall as flat as do Mr. Wilde's victims."

== See also ==
- List of American films of 1952
