= Dolní Vilémovice =

- Municipality
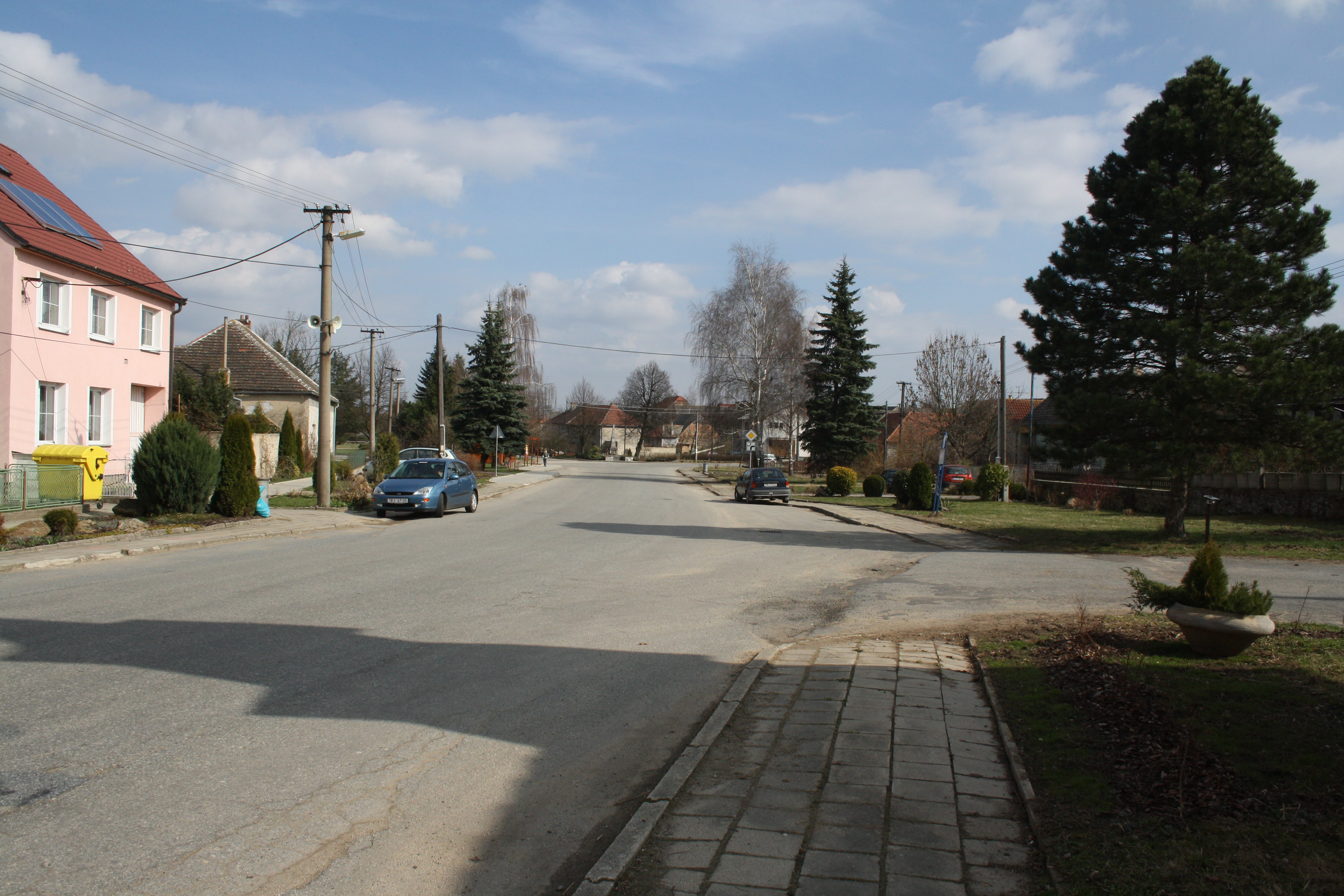
- Centre of Dolní Vilémovice

- Flag Coat of arms

- Location in the Czech Republic
- Coordinates: 49°9′13″N 15°58′38″E
- Country: Czech Republic
- Region: Vysočina
- District: Třebíč
- First mentioned: 1294

Area
  - Total: 9.91 km^{2} (3.83 sq mi)
- Elevation: 495 m (1,624 ft)

Population (2026-01-01)
  - Total: 436
  - Density: 44.0/km^{2} (114/sq mi)
- Time zone: UTC+1 (CET)
  - Summer (DST): UTC+2 (CEST)
- Postal code: 675 52
- Website: obecdolnivilemovice.cz

Dolní Vilémovice is a municipality and village in Třebíč District in the Vysočina Region of the Czech Republic. It has about 400 inhabitants.

Dolní Vilémovice lies approximately 11 kilometres (7 mi) south-east of Třebíč, 39 km (24 mi) south-east of Jihlava, and 153 km (95 mi) south-east of Prague.

== Demographics ==
Historical population
Year	Pop.	±%
1869	429	—
1880	501	+16.8%
1890	539	+7.6%
1900	629	+16.7%
1910	626	−0.5%
1921	637	+1.8%
1930	610	−4.2%
1950	474	−22.3%
1961	498	+5.1%
1970	504	+1.2%
1980	464	−7.9%
1991	429	−7.5%
2001	410	−4.4%
2011	379	−7.6%
2021	399	+5.3%
Source: Censuses

== Notable people ==
- Jan Kubiš (1913–1942), soldier involved in the assassination of Reinhard Heydrich
