= He Was Her Man =

1934 mob film directed by Lloyd Bacon

- Theatrical release poster
- Directed by: Lloyd Bacon
- Written by: Robert Lord (story); Niven Busch; Tom Buckingham
- Produced by: Robert Lord
- Starring: James Cagney; Joan Blondell; Victor Jory
- Cinematography: George Barnes
- Edited by: George Amy
- Music by: Bernhard Kaun
- Distributed by: Warner Bros. Pictures
- Release date: June 16, 1934
- Running time: 70 minutes
- Country: United States
- Language: English

He Was Her Man is a 1934 American pre-Code mob film starring James Cagney, Joan Blondell, and Victor Jory. The film was directed by Lloyd Bacon.

== Plot ==
Flicker Hayes informs the police after he sets up two men to be caught in a phony robbery attempt, because they were responsible for his going to prison. Dan Curly escapes, but the other kills a policeman and goes to the chair, so Dan wants two hitmen to get Flicker, who plans to leave the country. But he meets down-and-out Rose Lawrence, an ex-prostitute looking to hitch a ride to a small fishing village in the south to marry a Portuguese fisherman, and Flicker decides it would be a nice place to hide. After he seduces Rose, Flicker stakes her to a bus ticket and goes with her. But he's been spotted by Pop Sims, who follows them and reports Flicker's whereabouts to Dan. Meanwhile, Rose falls in love with Flicker, who is unaware that the hitmen are coming to kill him.

== Cast ==
- James Cagney as Flicker Hayes
- Joan Blondell as Rose Lawrence
- Victor Jory as Nick Gardella
- Frank Craven as Pop Sims
- Sarah Padden as Mrs. Gardella
- Harold Huber as J. C. Ward
- Russell Hopton as Monk
- Ralf Harolde as Frank 'Red' Deering
- John Qualen as Dutch
- Bradley Page as Dan 'Danny' Curly
- Samuel E. Hines as Gassy
- George Chandler as Highway Service Station Counterman
