= The Man with the Iron Heart (novel) =

2008 alternate history novel by Harry Turtledove

- Author: Harry Turtledove
- Illustrator: Big Dot Design
- Language: English
- Genre: Alternate history
- Publisher: Del Rey Books
- Publication date: July 22, 2008
- Publication place: United States
- Media type: Print (Hardcover & Paperback)
- Pages: 533 pp (first edition, hardback)
- ISBN: 978-0-345-50434-0 (first edition, hardback)

The Man with the Iron Heart is an alternate history novel by Harry Turtledove. Published in 2008, it takes as its premise the survival by Reinhard Heydrich of his 1942 assassination in Czechoslovakia and his subsequent leadership of the postwar Werwolf insurgency in occupied Germany, which Turtledove depicts as growing into a far more formidable force than was the case historically.

This novel follows the typical format of Turtledove novels, following events from multiple points of view. These include the historical figure of Heydrich, a Soviet counter-intelligence NKVD officer, and several Americans: another counter-intelligence officer, a soldier, a Congressman, a newspaper reporter, and a housewife who leads a movement to withdraw American forces from Germany. Much of the inspiration for the developments of the novel are drawn from the American occupation of Iraq during the Iraq War and the reaction to it back in the United States.

== Plot summary ==
The point of divergence occurs in June, 1942, where Reichsprotektor Reinhard Heydrich barely survives an assassination attempt in Prague. Historically, Heydrich was killed; this is the breakpoint which provides the basis for the rest of the novel.

In February, 1943, shortly after the German defeat at Stalingrad, Heydrich meets with Heinrich Himmler, the head of the SS. Foreseeing Germany's probable defeat, Heydrich convinces his superior to begin preparations for a possible partisan campaign should German forces lose the war.

Two years later, Allied forces have conquered Germany, and Hitler and Himmler are both dead by their own hands. With the Nazi government having surrendered, insurgents under Heydrich's command immediately begin a series of guerrilla attacks against the occupying forces, using car bombs, improvised explosive devices, anti-tank rockets, and suicide bombers. The insurgents assassinate Soviet Marshal Ivan Konev and American General George S. Patton. Though occupation officials quickly become aware of the campaign, they are unable to find any quick solutions to it. The American and British military attempt to tighten security in their sectors, while the Soviet NKVD spearheads a ruthless suppression of German civilians, including deportations and reprisal killings. The French also conduct similar repressive measures in their occupation zone.

As the casualties mount, Americans at home begin to question the effort. An Indiana housewife, who is informed that her son died on occupation duty, turns against American policy and forms an organization agitating to bring American soldiers home. Her Congressman, a Republican, uses the issue to launch attacks against the Truman administration and is soon joined by other members of his party. In Germany, a truck bomb destroys the Palace of Justice in Nuremberg, killing several officials and forcing a postponement of the trials of Nazi war criminals. In Berlin, dozens of Soviet officers are killed at a New Year's Eve party when the insurgency succeeds in poisoning their drinks using wood alcohol. Though the demonstrations in America grow, the Soviets respond by tightening their crackdown further.

Undeterred, Heydrich, concealed in an underground command post in the Bavarian Alps, continues to lead the guerrilla campaign. The American attempt to establish democratic institutions is thwarted when a mortar attack at a rally kills Konrad Adenauer, while the recapture of German nuclear physicists (during which Werner Karl Heisenberg is killed) leads Heydrich to a supply of radium that he uses in a dirty bomb which contaminates the American residential compound in Frankfurt. The Americans and the Soviets enjoy small successes against the insurgency, but the spectacular destruction of the Eiffel Tower in Paris and Westminster Cathedral and St. Paul's Cathedral in London by truck bombs further erodes the Western Allies' resolve to remain in Germany.

In the United States, the Republicans win the midterm Congressional elections of 1946. Now in control of Congress, they increase pressure on President Truman to withdraw American forces, refusing to fund their further presence. Though American officers appreciate the need to remain, discontent grows with the enlisted ranks, as many draftees begin staging protests demanding to be returned home. Another attempt to convene war-crimes trials against the Nazi leadership in the Soviet sector is frustrated when a Douglas C-47 Skytrain loaded with explosives crashes into the courthouse, killing the judges and staff inside.

American troops are now being withdrawn in increasing numbers. The Americans organize German civilian police in their zone, but this force's loyalty to democracy and ability to combat the re-emerging Nazis is doubtful. The C-47 attack finally brings about a degree of cooperation between the Soviet and American counterintelligence services. At a meeting, the Soviets turn over a Holocaust survivor who worked as a slave laborer constructing the bunker system Heydrich is using. He leads American forces to the bunker where the insurgent leader is hiding. When the U.S. Army begins to dig into the bunker, Heydrich and a group of his men attempt to escape, but come under fire by U.S. soldiers which results in Heydrich being killed. This success does not end the insurgency, however; Heydrich's deputy Joachim Peiper takes over as Reichsprotektor and orders the hijacking of three civilian airliners. While the Soviets remain committed to the occupation and to crushing the resistance, the Americans and British complete their withdrawal, leaving the Nazis ready to reemerge in western Germany. However, the French and Soviets tighten their grip on their occupation zones, leaving the ultimate fate of Germany in question as tensions continue to rise among the three remaining factions.
