= Teresa Wright =

American actress (1918–2005)

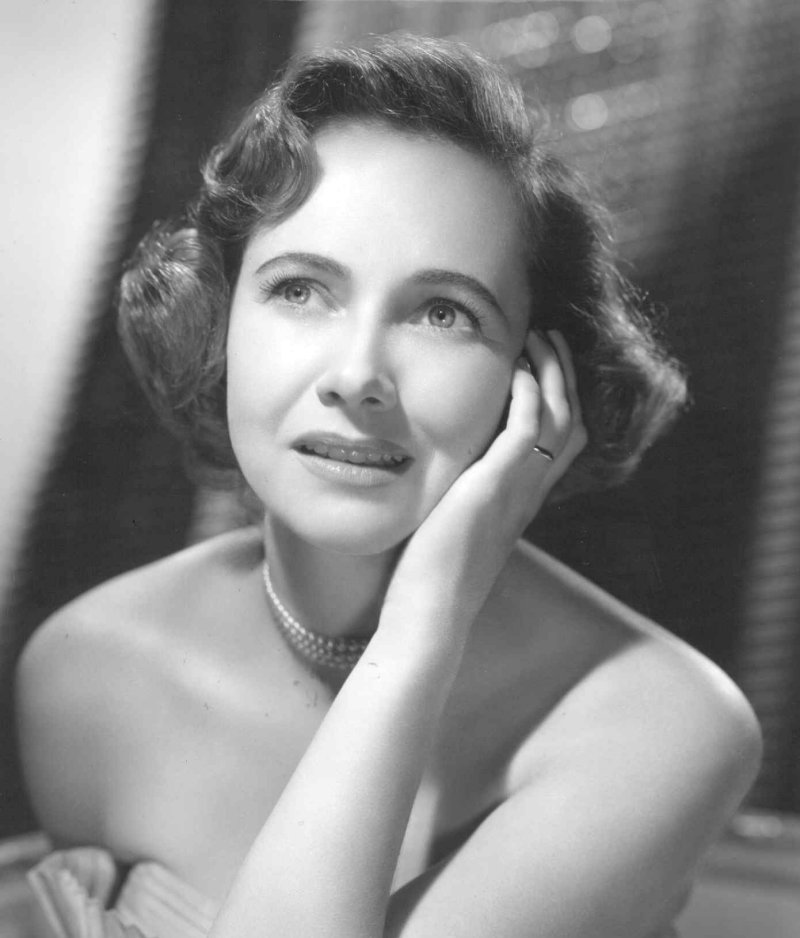
- Wright in 1953
- Born: Muriel Teresa Wright; October 27, 1918; New York City, U.S.
- Died: March 6, 2005 (aged 86); New Haven, Connecticut, U.S.
- Resting place: Evergreen Cemetery
- Occupation: Actress
- Years active: 1941–1997
- Spouses: Niven Busch (m. 1942; div. 1952) Robert Anderson (m. 1959; div. 1978)
- Children: 2

Muriel Teresa Wright (October 27, 1918 – March 6, 2005) was an American actress. She won the 1942 Academy Award for Best Supporting Actress for her role as Carol Beldon in Mrs. Miniver. She was nominated for the same award in 1941 for her debut work in The Little Foxes. Also in 1942, she received a nomination for the Academy Award for Best Actress for her performance in The Pride of the Yankees, opposite Gary Cooper. She is also known for her performances in Alfred Hitchcock's Shadow of a Doubt (1943), and in William Wyler's The Best Years of Our Lives (1946). Wright received five Photoplay Awards, two National Board of Review Awards, and two Hollywood Walk of Fame Stars for her contributions to motion pictures and television.

Wright received three Emmy Award nominations for her performances in the original Playhouse 90 television version of The Miracle Worker (1957), in the NBC Sunday Showcase feature The Margaret Bourke-White Story (1959), and in the CBS drama series Dolphin Cove (1989). She earned the acclaim of top film directors, including William Wyler, who called her the most promising actress he had directed, and Alfred Hitchcock, who admired her thorough preparation and quiet professionalism.

== Early life ==
Muriel Teresa Wright was born on October 27, 1918, in New York City, the daughter of Martha Espy and Arthur Hendricksen Wright, an insurance agent. Her parents separated when she was young. She grew up in Maplewood, New Jersey, where she attended Columbia High School. After seeing Helen Hayes star in Victoria Regina at the Broadhurst Theatre in New York City in 1936, Wright took an interest in acting and began playing leading roles in school plays.

Wright earned a scholarship to the Wharf Theater in Provincetown, Massachusetts, where she was an apprentice for two summers. Following her high school graduation in 1938, she went to New York, shortened her name to "Teresa Wright", and was hired as understudy to Dorothy McGuire and Martha Scott for the role of Emily in Thornton Wilder's stage production of Our Town at Henry Miller's Theatre. Wright took over the role when Scott left for Hollywood to film the on-screen version of the play.

== Acting career ==
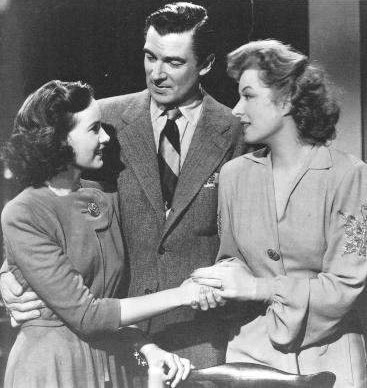
Wright, Walter Pidgeon and Greer Garson in Mrs. Miniver (1942)

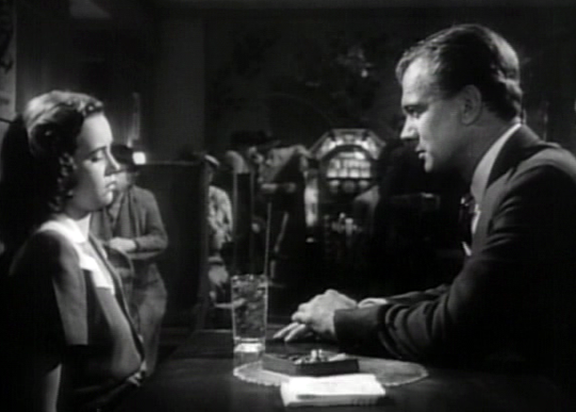
Wright and Joseph Cotten in Alfred Hitchcock's Shadow of a Doubt (1943)

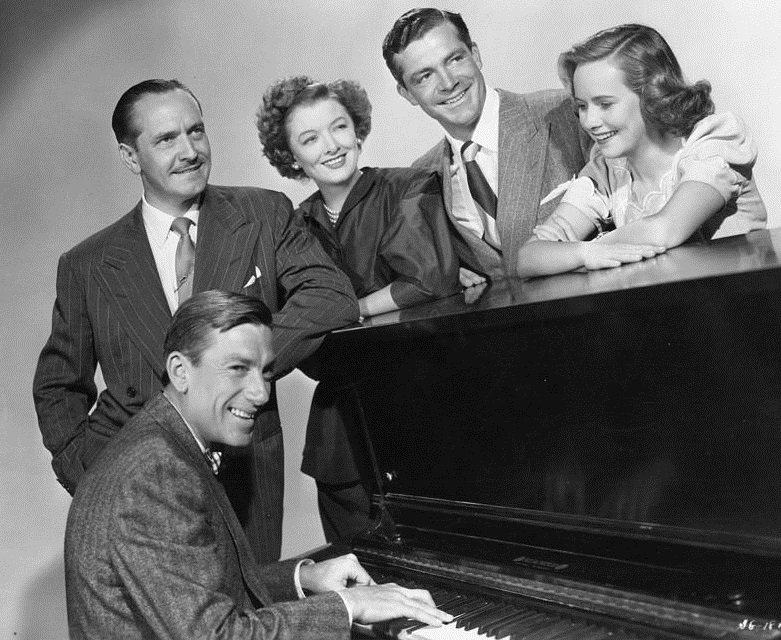
Publicity photo for The Best Years of Our Lives (1946); Hoagy Carmichael seated at piano and (standing from left) Fredric March, Myrna Loy, Dana Andrews, and Wright

In autumn 1939, Wright began a two-year appearance in the stage play Life with Father, playing the role of Mary Skinner. It was there that she was discovered by Samuel Goldwyn, who came to see her in the show she had been appearing in for almost a year. Goldwyn would later recall his first encounter with her backstage:

Miss Wright was seated at her dressing table, and looked for all the world like a little girl experimenting with her mother's cosmetics. I had discovered in her from the first sight, you might say, an unaffected genuineness and appeal.

Goldwyn immediately hired the young actress for the role of Bette Davis' naive and idealistic daughter in the 1941 adaptation of Lillian Hellman's The Little Foxes, signing her to a five-year Hollywood contract with the Goldwyn Studios. Asserting her seriousness as an actress, Wright insisted her contract contain unique clauses by Hollywood standards:

The aforementioned Teresa Wright shall not be required to pose for photographs in a bathing suit unless she is in the water. Neither may she be photographed running on the beach with her hair flying in the wind. Nor may she pose in any of the following situations: In shorts, playing with a cocker spaniel; digging in a garden; whipping up a meal; attired in firecrackers and holding skyrockets for the Fourth of July; looking insinuatingly at a turkey for Thanksgiving; wearing a bunny cap with long ears for Easter; twinkling on prop snow in a skiing outfit while a fan blows her scarf; assuming an athletic stance while pretending to hit something with a bow and arrow.

In 1941, Wright was nominated for the Academy Award for Best Supporting Actress for The Little Foxes. The following year, she was nominated again, this time for Best Actress, for her role as Lou Gehrig's wife in The Pride of the Yankees opposite Gary Cooper. The same year, she won the Academy Award for Best Supporting Actress as the courageous daughter-in-law of Greer Garson's character in Mrs. Miniver. Wright is the second (Fay Bainter, 1938 being the first) of only 12 actors who have been nominated in both categories in the same year. Her three Academy Award nominations and one Academy Award in her first three films is unique. She is one of only two performers to have received Academy Award nominations for their first three films, the other being Glenn Close.

In 1943, Wright appeared in the acclaimed Universal film Shadow of a Doubt, directed by Alfred Hitchcock, playing a young woman who discovers her beloved uncle (played by Joseph Cotten) is a serial murderer. Hitchcock thought Wright was one of the more intelligent actors he had worked with, and through his direction, he brought out her vivacity, warmth, and youthful idealism—characteristics uncommon in Hitchcock's heroines. In 1946, Wright delivered another notable performance in William Wyler's The Best Years of Our Lives, an award-winning film about the adjustments of servicemen returning home after World War II. Critic James Agee praised her performance in The Nation:

This new performance of hers, entirely lacking in big scenes, tricks, or obstreperousness—one can hardly think of it as acting—seems to me one of the wisest and most beautiful pieces of work I have seen in years. If the picture had none of the hundreds of other things it has to recommend it, I could watch it a dozen times over for that personality and its mastery alone.

Four years later, she would appear in another story of war veterans, Fred Zinnemann's The Men (1950), which starred Marlon Brando in his film debut. In 1947, Wright appeared in the western Pursued opposite Robert Mitchum. The moody "Freudian western" was written by her first husband Niven Busch. The following year, she starred in Enchantment, a story of two generations of lovers in parallel romances. Wright received glowing reviews for her performance. Newsweek commented: "Miss Wright, one of the screen's finest, glows as the Cinderella who captivated three men." And The New York Times concluded: "Teresa Wright plays with that breathless, bright-eyed rapture which she so remarkably commands."

In December 1948, after rebelling against the studio system that brought her fame, Wright had a public falling out with Samuel Goldwyn, which resulted in the cancellation of Wright's contract with his studio. In a statement published in The New York Times, Goldwyn cited as reasons her refusal to publicize the film Enchantment, and her being "uncooperative" and refusing to "follow reasonable instructions". In her written response, Wright denied Goldwyn's charges and expressed no regret over losing her $5,000 per week contract.

I would like to say that I never refused to perform the services required of me; I was unable to perform them because of ill health. I accept Mr. Goldwyn's termination of my contract without protest—in fact, with relief. The types of contracts standardized in the motion picture industry between players and producers are archaic in form and absurd in concept. I am determined never to set my name to another one ... I have worked for Mr. Goldwyn seven years because I consider him a great producer, and he has paid me well, but in the future I shall gladly work for less if by doing so I can retain my hold upon the common decencies without which the most glorified job becomes intolerable.

Years later, in an interview with The New York Post, Wright recalled: "I was going to be Joan of Arc, and all I proved was that I was an actress who would work for less money." For her next film, The Men (1950), instead of the $125,000 she had once commanded, she received $20,000.

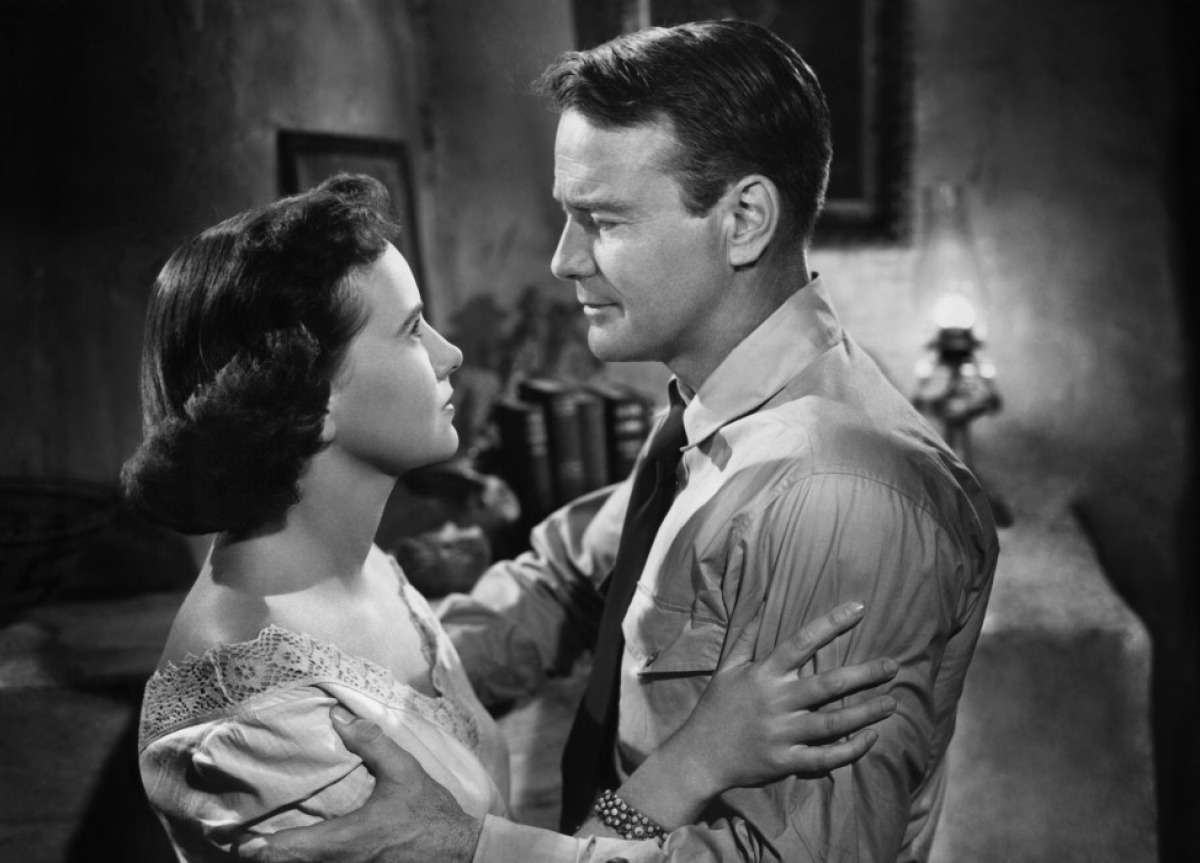
Wright and Lew Ayres in The Capture (1950)

In the 1950s, Wright appeared in several unsuccessful films, including The Capture (1950), Something to Live For (1952), California Conquest (1952), The Steel Trap (1952), Count the Hours (1953), The Actress (1953) and Track of the Cat (1954), opposite Robert Mitchum again. Despite the poor box-office showing of these films, Wright was usually praised for her performances. Toward the end of the decade, Wright began to work more frequently in television and theatre. She received Emmy Award nominations for her performances in the Playhouse 90 original television version of The Miracle Worker (1957) and in the Breck Sunday Showcase feature The Margaret Bourke-White Story (1960). In 1955 she played Doris Walker in The 20th Century-Fox Hour remake of the 1947 movie Miracle on 34th Street, opposite MacDonald Carey and Thomas Mitchell. In 1957, she starred on Broadway in The Dark at the Top of the Stairs by William Inge. Directed by Elia Kazan, it ran for 468 performances.

On February 8, 1960, Wright was inducted to the Hollywood Walk of Fame with two stars: one for motion pictures at 1658 Vine Street, and one for television at 6405 Hollywood Boulevard.

In the 1960s, Wright returned to the New York stage appearing in three plays: Mary, Mary (1962) at the Helen Hayes Theatre in the role of Mary McKellaway, I Never Sang for My Father (1968) at the Longacre Theatre in the role of Alice, and Who's Happy Now? (1969) at the Village South Theatre in the role of Mary Hallen. During this period, she toured throughout the United States in stage productions of Mary, Mary (1962), Tchin-Tchin (1963) in the role of Pamela Pew-Picket, and The Locksmith (1965) in the role of Katherine Butler Hathaway. In addition to her stage work, Wright made numerous television appearances throughout the decade, including episodes for The Alfred Hitchcock Hour (1964) on CBS, Bonanza (1964) on NBC, The Defenders (1964, 1965) on CBS and CBS Playhouse (1969).

In 1975, Wright appeared in the Broadway revival of Death of a Salesman, and in 1980, appeared in the revival of Morning's at Seven, for which she won a Drama Desk Award as a member of the Outstanding Ensemble Performance.

She appeared on The Love Boat S6 E11 "A Christmas Presence" as Sister Regina, who foils a con man's scheme to smuggle stolen gold molded as a painted creche scene. The episode aired on 12/18/1982. In 1989, she received her third Emmy Award nomination for her performance in the CBS drama series Dolphin Cove. She also appeared in Murder, She Wrote in the episode "Mr. Penroy's Vacation". Her last television role was in an episode of the CBS drama series Picket Fences in 1996.

Wright's later film appearances included a major role in Somewhere in Time (1980), the grandmother in The Good Mother (1988) with Diane Keaton, and her final role as Miss Birdie in John Grisham's The Rainmaker (1997), directed by Francis Ford Coppola.

== Personal life ==
Wright was married to writer Niven Busch from 1942 to 1952. They had two children: a son, Niven Terence Busch, born December 2, 1944; and a daughter, Mary-Kelly Busch, born September 12, 1947. She married playwright Robert Anderson in 1959. They divorced in 1978, but maintained a close relationship until the end of her life.

In her last decade, Wright lived quietly in her New England home in the town of Bridgewater, Connecticut, in Litchfield County, appearing occasionally at film festivals and forums and at events associated with the New York Yankees. In 1996, she reminisced about Alfred Hitchcock at the Edinburgh International Film Festival, and in 2003, she appeared on the Academy Awards show in a segment honoring previous Oscar-winners.

Her daughter, Mary-Kelly, is an author of books for children and young adults. Wright has two grandchildren, one of whom, Jonah Smith, co-produced Darren Aronofsky's films Pi (1998) and Requiem for a Dream (2000). In 1998, Smith accompanied Wright on her first visit to Yankee Stadium when she was invited to throw the ceremonial first pitch. Her appearance in Pride of the Yankees had sparked an interest in baseball and led her to become a Yankees fan.

== Death and legacy ==
Teresa Wright died on March 6, 2005 after suffering a heart attack at age 86 in Yale-New Haven Hospital in Connecticut. She donated her body to Yale School of Medicine before being buried at Evergreen Cemetery in New Haven.

When the roll call of former Yankees who had died was announced at Old Timer's Day on July 5, 2005, Wright's name was read among the ballplayers and members of the Yankees family.

A Girl's Got to Breathe: The Life of Teresa Wright by Donald Spoto was published in February 2016. Spoto was a close friend to Wright for more than 30 years, and was given exclusive access by her family to her papers and correspondence.

== Filmography ==
=== Film ===
Year	Title	Role	Director	Notes	Ref
1941	The Little Foxes	Alexandra Giddens	William Wyler	Nominated — Academy Award for Best Supporting Actress	
1942	Mrs. Miniver	Carol Beldon	William Wyler	Academy Award for Best Supporting Actress	
1942	The Pride of the Yankees	Eleanor Twitchell Gehrig	Sam Wood	Nominated — Academy Award for Best Actress	
1943	Shadow of a Doubt	Charlotte "Charlie" Newton	Alfred Hitchcock		
1944	Casanova Brown	Isabel Drury	Sam Wood		
1946	The Best Years of Our Lives	Peggy Stephenson	William Wyler		
1947	Pursued	Thorley Callum	Raoul Walsh		
1947	The Imperfect Lady	Millicent Hopkins	Lewis Allen		
1947	The Trouble with Women	Kate Farrell	Sidney Lanfield		
1948	Enchantment	Lark Ingoldsby	Irving Reis		
1950	The Capture	Ellen Tevlin Vanner	John Sturges		
1950	The Men	Ellen "Elly" Wilosek	Fred Zinnemann		
1952	Something to Live For	Edna Miller	George Stevens		
1952	California Conquest	Julie Lawrence	Lew Landers		
1952	The Steel Trap	Laurie Osborne	Andrew L. Stone		
1953	Count the Hours	Ellen Braden	Don Siegel		
1953	The Actress	Annie Jones	George Cukor		
1954	Track of the Cat	Grace Bridges	William A. Wellman		
1956	The Search for Bridey Murphy	Ruth Simmons	Noel Langley		
1957	Escapade in Japan	Mary Saunders	Arthur Lubin		
1958	The Restless Years	Elizabeth Grant	Helmut Käutner		
1964	The Alfred Hitchcock Hour	Marion Brown	Joseph Newman	Season 2 Episode 12: "Three Wives Too Many"	
1964	The Alfred Hitchcock Hour	Stella	Harvey Hart	Season 3 Episode 6: "Lonely Place"	
1964	Bonanza	Katherine Saunders	William F. Claxton	Season 5 Episode 16: "My Son, My Son"	
1969	Hail, Hero!	Santha Dixon	David Miller		
1969	The Happy Ending	Mrs. Spencer	Richard Brooks		
1972	Crawlspace	Alice Graves	John Newland	TV movie	
1974	Hawkins		Jud Taylor	Season 1 Episode 6: "Murder on the 13th Floor"	
1974	The Elevator	Edith Reynolds	Jerry Jameson	TV movie	
1976	Flood!	Alice Cutler	Earl Bellamy	TV movie	
1977	Roseland	May (The Waltz)	James Ivory		
1980	Somewhere in Time	Laura Roberts	Jeannot Szwarc		
1983	Bill: On His Own	Mae Driscoll	Anthony Page	TV movie	
1987	The Fig Tree	Miranda's Grandmother	Calvin Skaggs	TV movie	
1988	The Good Mother	Eleanor, Grandmother	Leonard Nimoy		
1990	Perry Mason: The Case of the Desperate Deception	Helene Berman	Christian I. Nyby II	TV movie	
1990	The Exorcist III	Penitent	William Peter Blatty	Cameo, uncredited	
1993	The Red Coat		Robin Swicord	Short	
1997	The Rainmaker	Colleen "Miss Birdie" Birdsong	Francis Ford Coppola		

=== Television ===
Year	Title	Role	Notes
1951-1955	Lux Video Theatre	Laura Pennington/Emily Lawrence	3 Episodes
1952-1957	Schlitz Playhouse	Sister Louise/Terry Hagen/Laura Savage	3 Episodes
1953-1957	The Ford Television Theatre	Mrs. Wentworth/Paula/Janet Larson/Julie Forrester/Alison Stevens	5 Episodes
1954-1956	Climax!	Louella Parsons/Lorna Baylor/Eilene Wade	3 Episodes
1954-1962	The United States Steel Hour	Louise Henderson/Allie Gulliver/Margaret Swift/Miss Mary/Actress	5 Episodes
1955	General Electric Theater	Mary Todd Lincoln	Episode: Love is Eternal
1955	The Elgin Hour	Marianne Merrick	Episode: Driftwood
1955	The Loretta Young Show	Schoolteacher	Episode: My Uncle O'Moore
1955	The Alcoa Hour	Slyvia Hallock	Episode: Undertow
1955-1956	The Star and the Story	Eleanor Linton/Terry Spencer	2 Episodes
1955-1956	Four Star Playhouse	Carol/Sister Mary Winifred	2 Episodes
1955-1956	The 20th Century-Fox Hour	Janice Walner/Doris Walker	2 Episodes
1956	Screen Directors Playhouse	Mary	Episode: No. 5 Checked Out
1956	Celebrity Playhouse	Helen Fiske	Episode: No Escape
1957	Playhouse 90	Carol Morton/Annie Sullivan	2 Episodes
1959	Adventures in Paradise	Emilie Forbes	Episode: The Pit of Silence
1960	Sunday Showcase	Julia Grant/Margaret Bourke-White	2 Episodes
1960	Our American Heritage	Julia Grant	Episode: Shadow of a Soldier
1961	Theatre '62	Margit Brandt	Episode: Intermezzo
1962	The DuPont Show of the Week	Mary	Episode: Big Deal in Loredo
1964	Bonanza	Katherine Saunders	Episode: My Son, My Son
1964	The Alfred Hitchcock Hour	Stella/Marion Brown	2 Episodes
1964-1965	The Defenders	Melissa Holmes/Anne Clark	2 Episodes
1965	Festival	Margaret Haber	Episode: Let Me Count the Ways
1969	Lancer	Ellen Haney	Episode: Yesterday's Vendetta
1969	CBS Playhouse	Virgie	Episode: Appalachian Autumn
1973	Owen Marshall, Counselor at Law	Ruthanne Cameron	Episode: The Camerons Are a Special Clan
1974	Hawkins	Jenny Burke	Episode: Murder on the Thirteenth Floor
1979	NBC Special Treat	Jessica	Episode: The Rocking Chair Rebellion
1982	The Love Boat	Sister Regina	Episode: The Christmas Presence
1986	Morningstar/Eveningstar	Alice Blair	2 Episodes
1986	Guiding Light	Grace	Episode: 1697
1988	Murder, She Wrote	Helen Appletree	Episode: Mr. Penroy's Vacation
1989	Dolphin Cove	Nina Rothman	Episode: The Elders
1996	Picket Fences	Emily Ridgefield	Episode: My Romance

=== Stage ===
Year	Title	Role	Notes
1938	Our Town	Emily Webb (Understudy)	Henry Miller's Theatre, Broadway
1939	Life With Father	Mark Skinner	Empire Theatre, Broadway
1957	The Dark at the Top of the Stairs	Cora Flood	Music Box Theatre, Broadway
1968	I Never Sang For My Father	Alice	Longacre Theatre, Broadway
1969	Who's Happy Now?	Mary Hallen	Village South Theatre, Off-Broadway
1975	Death of a Salesman	Linda Loman	Circle in the Square Theatre, Broadway
1975	Ah, Wilderness!	Lily Miller	Circle in the Square Theatre, Broadway
1980	Morning's at Seven	Cora Swanson	Lyceum Theatre, Broadway
1991	On Borrowed Time	Nellie	Circle in the Square Theatre, Broadway

== Awards and nominations ==
Awards and nominations received by Anjelica Huston
Award	Year (Note: Indicates the year of ceremony.)	Nominated work	Category	Result
Academy Awards	1941	The Little Foxes	Best Supporting Actress	Nominated
Academy Awards	1942	Mrs. Miniver	Best Supporting Actress	Won
Academy Awards	1942	The Pride of the Yankees	Best Actress	Nominated
Primetime Emmy Awards	1957	Playhouse 90	Best Actress - Single Performance	Nominated
Primetime Emmy Awards	1959	NBC Sunday Showcase	Best Actress - Single Performance	Nominated
Primetime Emmy Awards	1989	Dolphin Cove	Outstanding Guest Actress in a Drama Series	Nominated
National Board of Review	1942	Mrs. Miniver	Best Acting	Won
National Board of Review	1943	Shadow of a Doubt	Best Acting	Won
Photoplay Awards	1941	The Little Foxes	Best Performance of the Month	Won
Photoplay Awards	1942	Mrs. Miniver	Best Performance of the Month	Won
Photoplay Awards	1942	The Pride of the Yankees	Best Performance of the Month	Won
Photoplay Awards	1943	Shadow of a Doubt	Best Performance of the Month	Won
Photoplay Awards	1950	Enchantment	Best Performance of the Month	Won
