= Operation Anthropoid Memorial =

Memorial in Prague

Coordinates: 50°7′4″N 14°27′55″E

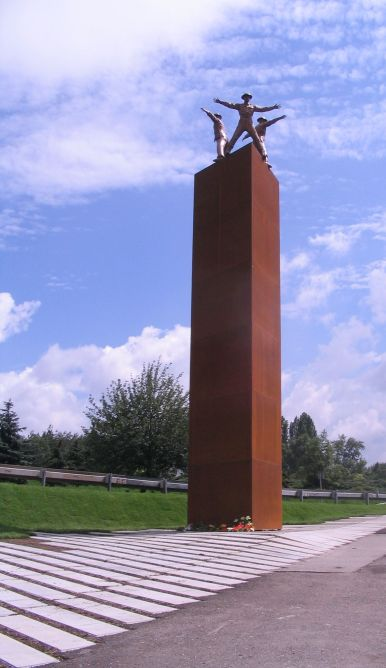
Full view of the memorial

The Operation Anthropoid Memorial (Czech: památník Operace Anthropoid) is a monument in Libeň district of Prague, Czech Republic. It commemorates Operation Anthropoid, an ambush on senior Nazi official Reinhard Heydrich by Czechoslovak partisans on 27 May 1942, which resulted in his death one week later.

== Design and construction ==
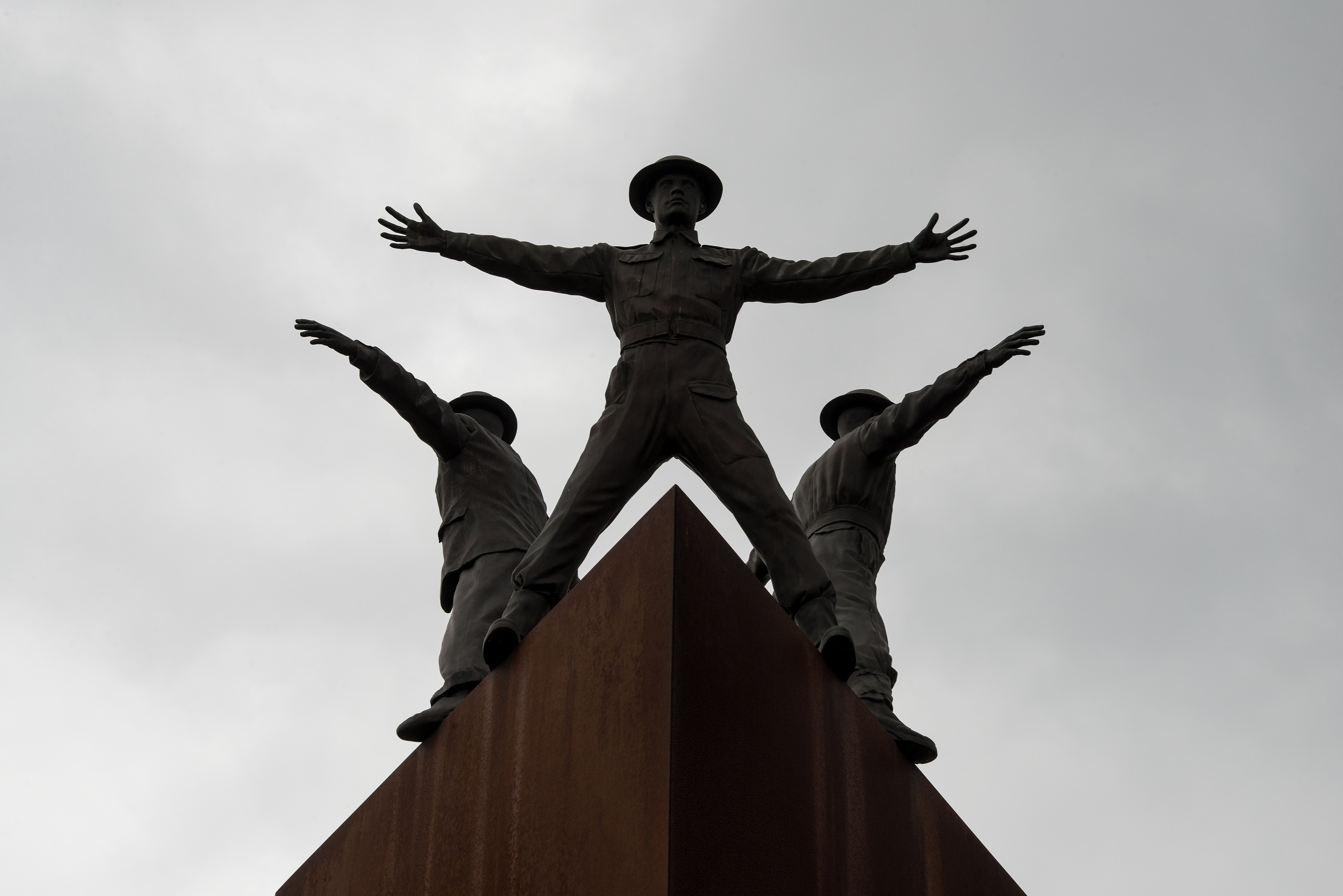
Top of the monument

Operation Anthropoid had never served as the basis of a sculpture or public work of art. On 14 April 2008, the Prague 8 city district announced its intention to hold a one-round competition, open to the public, for the design of a memorial to Operation Anthropoid and to Jan Kubiš and Jozef Gabčík. One of the chief design requirements for the memorial was that it should not merely commemorate one of the most successful actions of the Czechoslovak resistance during World War II, but that it should also serve as a tribute to the virtues embodied in the Czechoslovak military tradition – a commitment to one's oath of duty, and to defending one’s nation even at the cost of one's own life.

Twenty proposals were submitted. On 27 May 2008, the anniversary of the Operation Anthropoid, a proposal was chosen. The authors of the winning proposal were artists David Moješčík and Michal Šmeral, and architects Miroslava Tůmová and Jiří Gulbis. Moješčík and Šmeral had previously collaborated on various projects in connection with "public art".

The memorial was to be located on the actual site of the assassination. Work on the memorial began immediately thereafter. On 27 May 2009 at 10:35 a.m. – the exact time of the assassination – a celebratory unveiling of the completed memorial was held.

The figures are manufactured from bronze cast from a clay-modelled statue. The column is made of welded steel enclosed by corten steel.

== Inspiration and evolution of design ==
The starting point for the design was Leonardo da Vinci's 1490 drawing "Vitruvian Man"; from which is derived the "Vitruvian Cross", illustrating the proportions of the human body. The stance of the depicted man as a generalization of the human physique is therefore an allusion to the very name "Operation Anthropoid", as "anthropoid" means "human in form or appearance". Although the memorial's design underwent a constant evolution as the artists worked on it, the "Vitruvian Man" was the original basis of the figures surmounting the sculpture's central column and remained the memorial's chief design element from its conception to its completion. One of the initial concepts for the memorial involved the use of a stone block to represent the Czech flag. This early conception then went through various iterations, in which the block was first divided into the three geometrical shapes composing the Czech flag, and was then, in a subsequent design, merged with the shape of a "Czech hedgehog" – an anti-tank obstacle most familiar to English-speakers from its use by the Germans on the beaches of Normandy but invented in Czechoslovakia and used throughout Europe in World War II. The flag motif, though eventually simplified, remained a basic element of the finished composition. It was incorporated into the design of the central column, which, being triangular in cross-section, corresponds to the equilateral triangle in the Czech flag. This simplification was necessitated by the somewhat awkward shape of the memorial site. The central column was clad in corten, a form of weathered steel, symbolizing the destruction of Czech statehood and the subjugation of the entire nation. After being exposed to the weather for several years the corten will form a stable, rust-like appearance. As envisioned in the initial drafts the column is surmounted by three Vitruvian figures, each standing on an edge of the column and facing outward.

== Geographic context ==
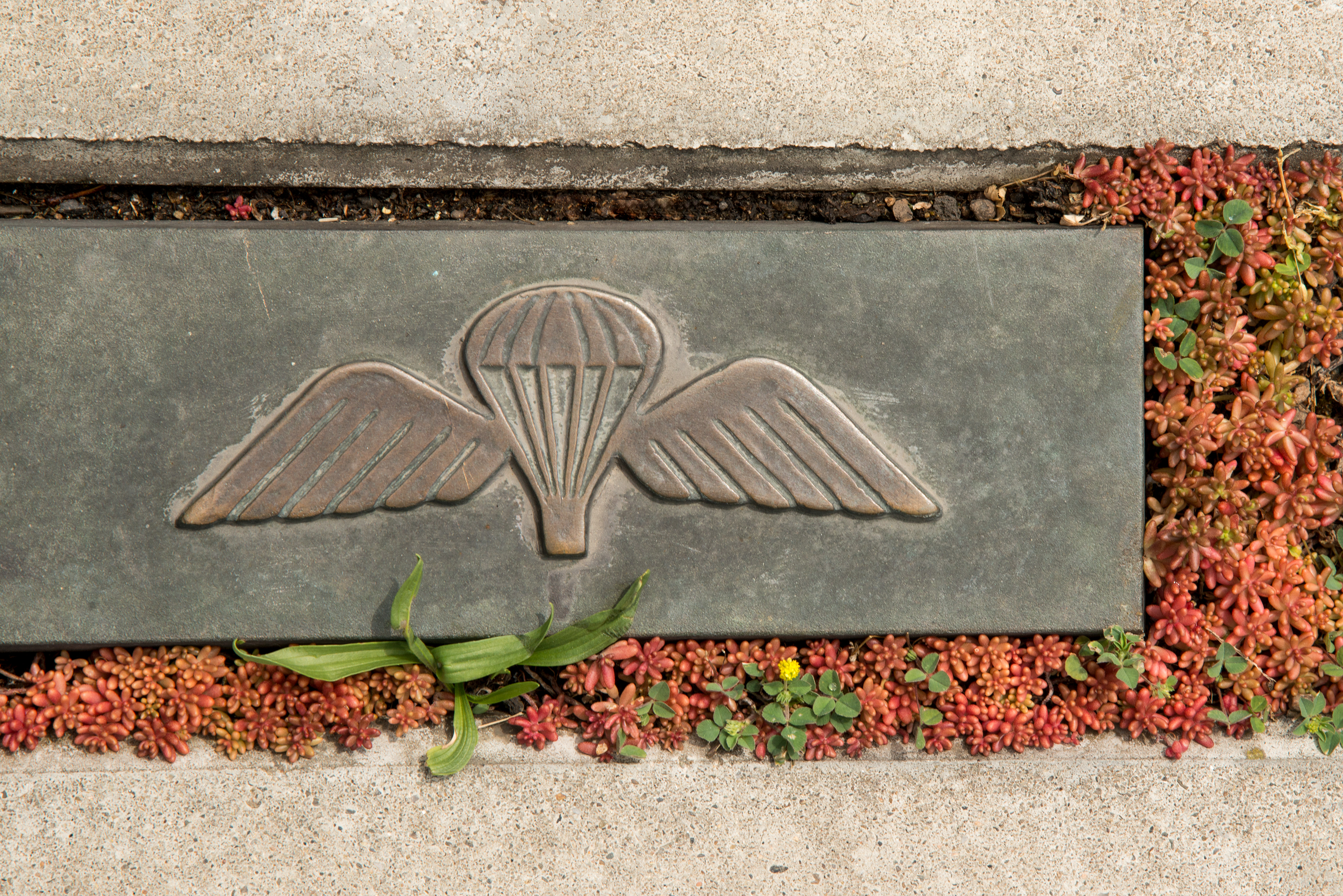
Detail

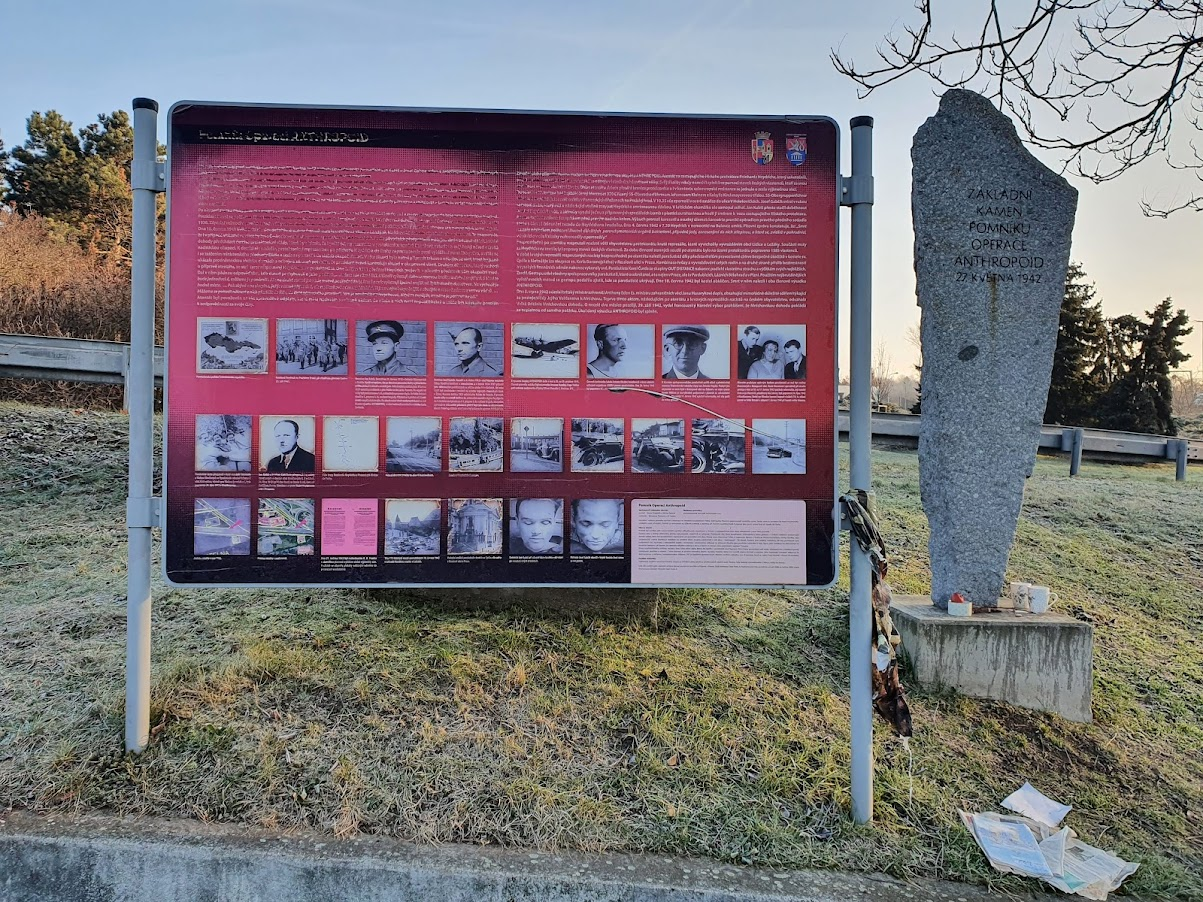

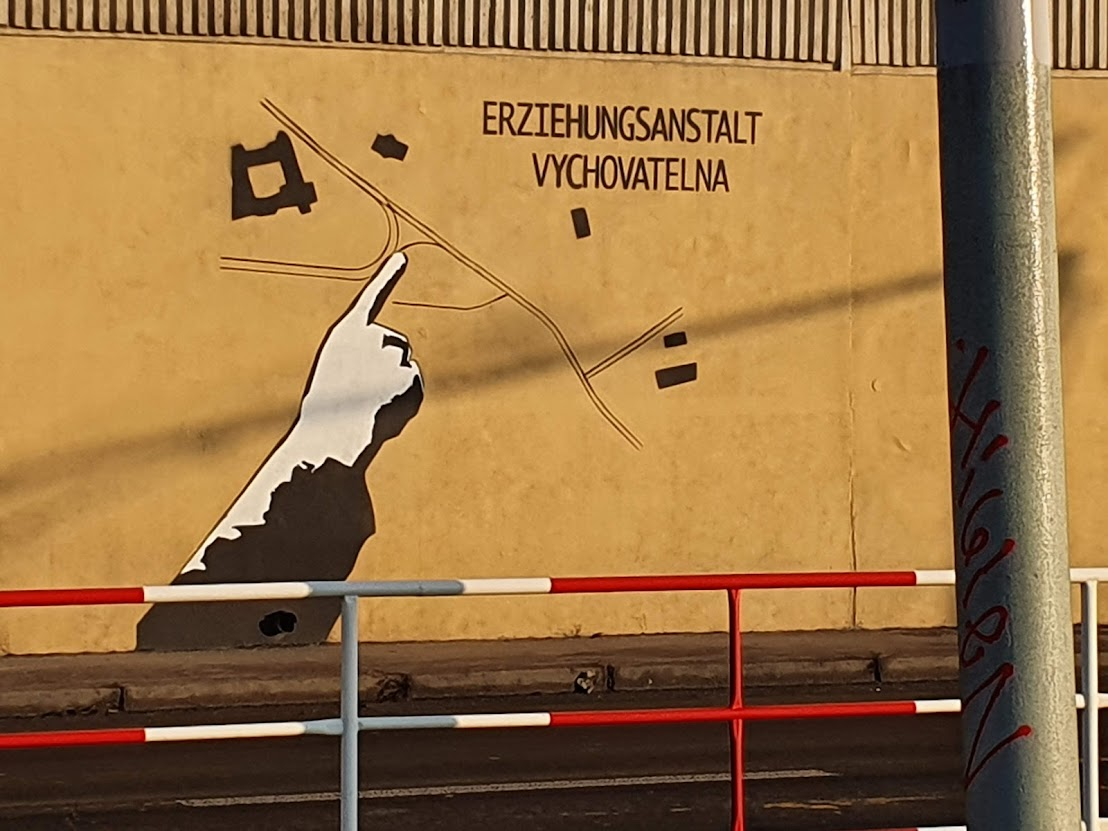
Street art at the place of the ambush on Reinhard Heydrich

The assassination took place in Prague 8, at a hairpin turn created by the junction of Kirchmayerova třída (Avenue) and V Holešovičkách (Avenue). This site was chosen because the hairpin turn required Heydrich's driver to slow down when negotiating this turn, thereby creating a favorable opportunity for an ambush. The actual site of the assassination was the site chosen for the memorial. In the intervening years, the local geography has greatly changed. Kirchmayerova třída, now named Zenklova, no longer intersects V Holešovičkách. Although there is still a junction in the same place, it is formed by V Holešovičkách and two access ramps of the surrounding traffic interchange, the three roads together forming a triangular traffic island inside the hairpin turn where Kirchmayerova třída formerly intersected V Holešovičkách. Because the memorial was to be located amidst several busy thoroughfares, its most numerous and frequent observers would be the occupants of passing vehicles; this therefore became a very important factor in determining the proper scale for the memorial. The area surrounding the base of the sculpture has been designed so that the memorial integrates with the existing features of the parterre in a very natural manner. This area now consists of long, narrow concrete slabs, separated by narrow strips of earth, allowing grass to grow between the slabs. The greenery bursting through the concrete slabs not only integrates the memorial into the site, but also emphasises the vital spirit of the memorial and the events it commemorates. There is a memorial plaque directly in front of the sculpture. The whole composition escalates towards the sculpture. The ample space offered by this design enables the site to serve as a dignified gathering place for those wishing to remember the sacrifices made by the participants in Operation Anthropoid, as well as those who may gather for any solemn occasion.

Streets immediately to the west of the memorial site are now named after Jozef Gabčík and Jan Kubiš, who carried out the ambush, and Josef Valčík, who acted as lookout and died alongside them in Saints Cyril and Methodius Cathedral.
