= Atentát =

1964 Czech war film

- Movie poster
- Directed by: Jiří Sequens
- Written by: Miloslav Fábera; Kamil Pixa; Jiří Sequens
- Starring: Radoslav Brzobohatý
- Cinematography: Rudolf Milič
- Edited by: Jan Chaloupek
- Music by: Miloš Vacek
- Distributed by: Ústřední půjčovna filmů
- Release date: 20 August 1964
- Running time: 104 minutes
- Country: Czechoslovakia
- Languages: Czech; German

Atentát (English title: The Assassination) is a 1964 black-and-white Czechoslovak war film directed by Jiří Sequens. The film depicts events before and after the World War II assassination of top German leader Reinhard Heydrich in Prague (Operation Anthropoid). Czech historians have called the film the historically most accurate depiction of the events surrounding Operation Anthropoid. (Note: Contemporary critic Kenneth Tynan described it as "conventional".)

The agents portrayed in the film are not referred to by their real names but by the historical cover names they assumed for the operation. For example, Jan Kubiš is called Otto Strnad.

== Plot ==
On September 27, 1941, Reinhard Heydrich, one of the most feared top officials of the Nazi Party, an architect of the Holocaust and Hitler's possible successor, is appointed "Reichsprotektor" of Bohemia and Moravia. As a result of his brutality and oppression he is also called "The Butcher of Prague" or "The Blond Beast".

In the UK, a squad of agents is selected and trained before parachuting into Czechoslovakia. The team operates in Prague and plans the attack for about six months. The mission, Operation Anthropoid, is executed in the capital on May 27, 1942, in an ambush. It almost fails when one of their Sten guns jams, but Heydrich is severely wounded by a grenade. Heydrich eventually dies from his wounds and during the frenzied aftermath the German high command takes savage reprisals, including the massacre of 340 men, women and children of Lidice and the razing of the village. The group is eventually betrayed by one of its members and they are cornered in a church crypt in Prague. In the gun-battle that follows, all agents take their own lives.

== Cast ==
- Radoslav Brzobohatý – 1st Lt. Král (based on Adolf Opálka)
- Luděk Munzar – 1st Lt. Sedlák (based on Alfred Bartoš)
- Ladislav Mrkvička – Serg. Vyskocil (based on Jozef Gabčík)
- Rudolf Jelínek – Serg. Strnad (based on Jan Kubiš)
- Jiří Kodet – Serg. Tousek (based on Josef Valčík)
- Harry Studt - Wilhelm Canaris
- Josef Vinklář – Serg. Vrbas (based on Karel Čurda)

== Reception ==
=== Awards ===
- 4th Moscow International Film Festival - Golden Prize.
- 6th Thessaloniki Week of Greek Cinema - Honorable mention, foreign film out of competition. (Note: As Ο δήμιος της Πράγας)

== See also ==
Related films

- Hangmen Also Die! (1943)
- Hitler's Madman (1943)
- The Silent Village (1943)
- Operation Daybreak (1975)
- Anthropoid (2016)
- The Man with the Iron Heart (2016)
