= Jan Kubiš =

Czech soldier who killed Reinhard Heydrich

Colonel Jan Kubiš
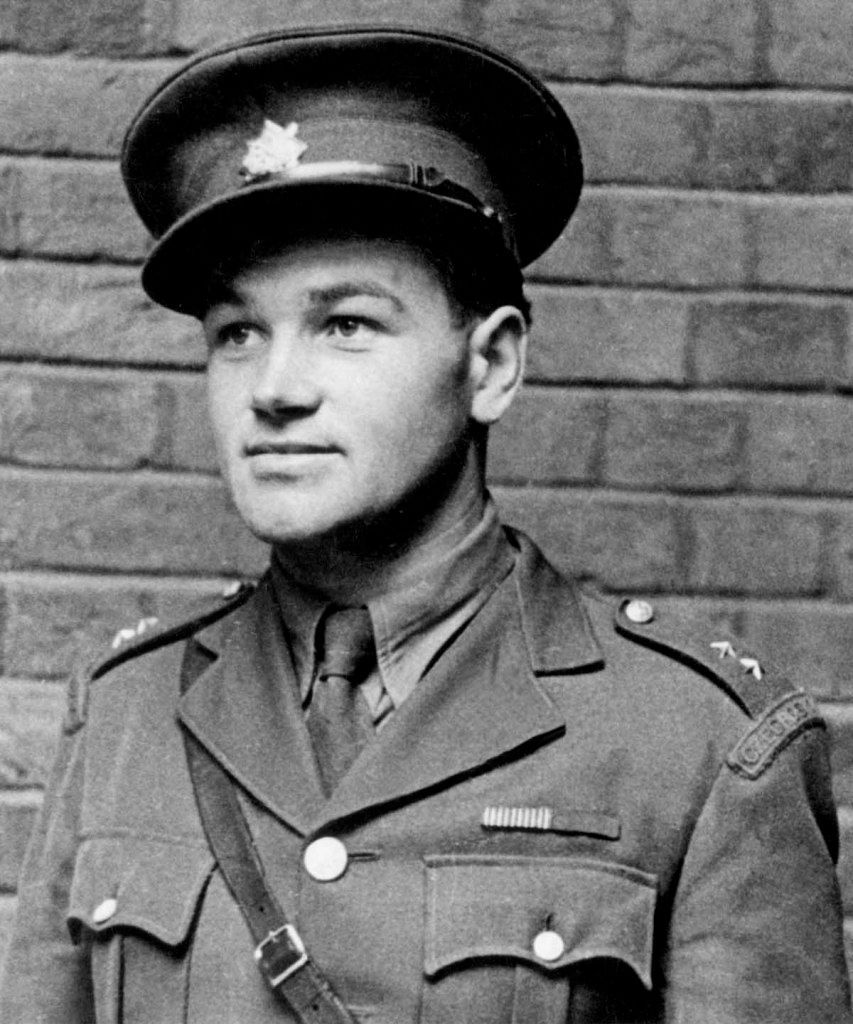
- Kubiš in 1941
- Born: 24 June 1913: Dolní Vilémovice, Austria-Hungary
- Died: 18 June 1942 (aged 28): Prague, Protectorate of Bohemia and Moravia
- Burial place: Ďáblice cemetery
- Military career
- Allegiance: Czechoslovakia; French Third Republic; Britain
- Branch: Czechoslovak Army; French Foreign Legion; Czechoslovak government-in-exile
- Service years: 1935–1938; 1939–1940; 1940–1942
- Rank: Rittmeister Posthumously rank of colonel in 2002
- Unit: Special Operations Executive
- Conflicts: World War II; Battle of France; Operation Anthropoid
- Awards: Czechoslovak War Cross 1939–1945; Croix de Guerre

Jan Kubiš (24 June 1913 – 18 June 1942) was a Czech soldier, one of a team of Czechoslovak British-trained paratroopers sent to eliminate acting Reichsprotektor (Realm-Protector) of Bohemia and Moravia, SS-Obergruppenführer Reinhard Heydrich, in 1942 as part of Operation Anthropoid. During the assassination attempt, Kubiš threw a makeshift grenade that mortally wounded Heydrich.

== Biography ==
Jan Kubiš was born in 1913 in Dolní Vilémovice, Moravia in the Austro-Hungarian Empire (present-day Czech Republic). Jan was a Boy Scout.

Jan Kubiš, having previously been an active member of Orel, started his military career as a Czechoslovak army conscript on 1 November 1935 by 31st Infantry Regiment "Arco" in Jihlava. After passing petty officer course and promotion to corporal, Kubiš served some time in Znojmo before being transferred to 34th infantry regiment "Marksman Jan Čapek" in Opava, where he served at guard battalion stationed in Jakartovice. Here, Kubiš reached promotion to platoon sergeant.

During the Czechoslovak mobilisation of 1938, Kubiš served as deputy commander of a platoon in Czechoslovak border fortifications in the Opava area. Following the Munich Agreement and demobilisation, Kubiš was discharged from army on 19 October 1938 and returned to his civilian life, working at a brick factory.

At the eve of World War II, on 16 June 1939, Kubiš fled Czechoslovakia and joined a forming Czechoslovak unit in Kraków, Poland. Soon he was transferred to Algiers, where he entered the French Foreign Legion. He fought in France during the early stage of World War II and received his Croix de Guerre there.

A month after the German victory in the Battle of France, Kubiš fled to Great Britain, where he received training as a paratrooper. The Free Czechoslovaks, as he and other self-exiled Czechoslovaks were called, were stationed at Cholmondeley Castle near Malpas in Cheshire. He and his best friend, Jozef Gabčík, both befriended the Ellison family, from Ightfield, Shropshire, whom they met while in Whitchurch, Shropshire.

In 1941, Kubiš was dropped into Czechoslovakia as part of Operation Anthropoid.

=== Assassination of Reinhard Heydrich ===
Jozef Gabčík and Jan Kubiš were airlifted along with seven soldiers from Czechoslovakia's army-in-exile in the United Kingdom and two other groups named Silver A and Silver B (who had different missions) by a Royal Air Force Halifax of No. 138 Squadron into Czechoslovakia at 10 pm on 28 December 1941. In Prague, they contacted several families and anti-Nazi organisations who helped them during the preparations for the assassination.

On 27 May 1942, Reinhard Heydrich had planned to fly to Berlin for a meeting with Hitler. German documents suggest that Hitler intended to transfer Heydrich to German occupied France, where the French resistance was gaining ground. Heydrich would have to pass a section where the Dresden-Prague road merged with a road to the Troja Bridge. The junction, in the Prague suburb of Libeň, was well-suited for the attack because motorists have to slow for a hairpin bend. At 10:30 am, Heydrich proceeded on his daily commute from his home in Panenské Břežany to Prague Castle. Gabčík and Kubiš waited at the tram stop on the curve near Bulovka Hospital in Prague 8-Libeň. As Heydrich's open-topped Mercedes-Benz arrived, Gabčík tried to shoot Heydrich, but his Sten gun jammed. Heydrich ordered his driver, SS-Oberscharführer Klein, to stop the car. As the car braked in front of him, Kubiš threw a modified anti-tank grenade (concealed in a briefcase) at the vehicle; he misjudged his throw. Instead of landing inside the car, it landed against the rear wheel. Nonetheless, the bomb severely wounded Heydrich when it detonated, its fragments ripping through the right rear fender and embedding shrapnel from the upholstery of the car into Heydrich, causing serious injuries to his left side, with major damage to his diaphragm, spleen and lung, as well as a fractured rib. Kubiš received a minor wound to his face from the shrapnel. As Kubiš staggered against the railings, Klein leapt out of the shattered limousine with a drawn pistol; Kubiš recovered and jumped on his bicycle and pedaled away, scattering passengers spilling from the tram, by firing in the air with his Colt M1903 pistol. Klein tried to shoot at him but dazed by the explosion, pressed the magazine release catch and the gun jammed. Heydrich died of his injuries on 4 June.

=== Attempted capture of the parachutists ===
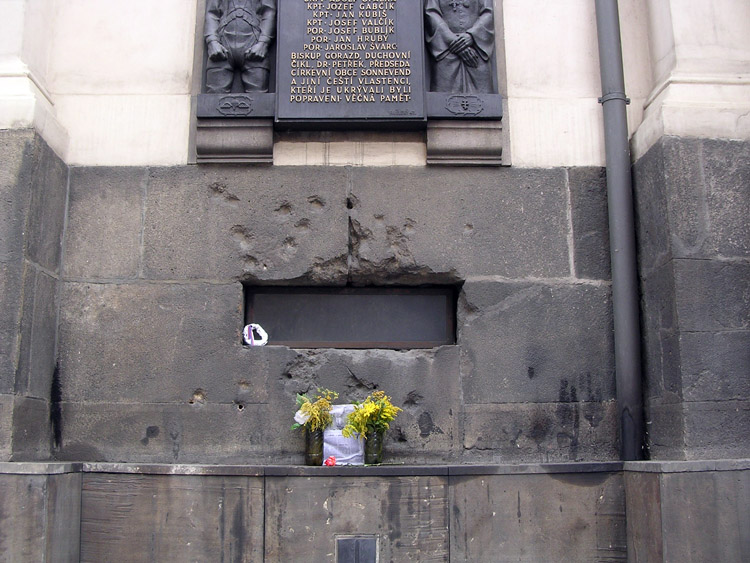
Bullet-scarred window of the Church of St Cyril and St Methodious in Prague where Kubiš and his compatriots were cornered

Kubiš and his group were found on 18 June in the Church of St Cyril and St Methodius in Resslova Street in Prague. In a battle that lasted for six hours, Kubiš was seriously wounded by a grenade and was found unconscious. He died of his wounds shortly after arrival at the hospital. Heinz Pannwitz, the German detective charged with capturing at least one of the perpetrators alive, later stated:

He had tried to use poison on himself but apparently lost consciousness before he could do so. Although he was immediately transferred to the hospital none of the doctors’ attempts to keep him alive succeeded. He died within twenty minutes.

The other parachutists committed suicide to avoid capture after an additional four-hour battle with the SS. Kubiš's remains, along with others, were buried secretly in a mass grave at the Ďáblice cemetery in Prague.

In revenge, the Nazis murdered 24 family members and close relatives of Jan Kubiš in the Mauthausen Concentration Camp: his father, both full and half-siblings, including their wives and husbands, cousins, aunts and uncles.

== Recognition ==
Shortly after his successful mission, Kubiš (as well as Gabčík) was promoted to the rank of second lieutenant in memoriam. After the liberation of Czechoslovakia he was further promoted to the rank of staff captain in memoriam. During the celebration of the 60th anniversary of the assassination of Heydrich in 2002, Kubiš was again promoted in memoriam, to the rank of colonel.

Apart from the Czechoslovak Military Cross 1939 and Croix de Guerre (both he received in 1940), Kubiš was posthumously decorated with the Commemorative Medal of the Czechoslovak Army, F, GB (1944), another two Czechoslovak Military Crosses (1942, 1945), King's Commendation for Brave Conduct (1947), Czechoslovak Military Order for Liberty (1949), Military Order of the White Lion "For Victory" 1st Class (1968), Order of Milan Rastislav Štefánik (1992) and Cross of Defence of the Minister of Defence of the Czech Republic (2008).

There are streets named after Jan Kubiš in the cities of Prague (close to the Operation Anthropoid Memorial), Pardubice, Tábor, Třebíč and other places. In 2013 (100th anniversary of Kubiš's birth) a small memorial and museum was open in the house where Jan Kubiš was born. Since 2010 a National memorial and museum dedicated to all heroes related to the assassination of Heydrich is open in the crypt of Ss. Cyril and Methodius Cathedral in Prague.

Unknown until after World War II, Karel Čurda, the member of their squad who betrayed them to the Nazis, was coincidentally also buried at the cemetery. However, in 1990 the mass graves were excavated and a memorial site with symbolic gravestones was established instead. In 2009, a memorial was built at the place of the attack on Heydrich. Coinciding with the release of the film Anthropoid, campaigners called for Kubiš's and Gabčík's bodies to be identified and exhumed from the mass-grave at the Ďáblice Cemetery, Prague, and to be given a dignified burial fitting "the heroes of anti-Nazi resistance".

A memorial stone for Jan Kubiš and Jozef Gabčík can be found in the grounds of St John the Baptist Church in Ightfield (ref W9VR+FJ Whitchurch) on Google Maps.

== Kubiš in film and fiction ==
Kubiš is portrayed by:

- Rudolf Jelínek (1964) Atentát
- Timothy Bottoms (1975) Operation Daybreak
- Miroslav Rataj (1975) Sokolovo
- Patrik Staněk (2011) Lidice
- Jamie Dornan (2016) Anthropoid
- Jack O'Connell (2017) The Man with the Iron Heart

== See also ==
- Adolf Opálka

== Bibliography ==
- Bryant, Chad Carl (2007). Prague in Black: Nazi Rule and Czech Nationalism. Cambridge, MA: Harvard University Press. ISBN 978-0-674-02451-9.
- Burian, Michal; Knížek, Aleš; Rajlich, Jiří; Stehlík, Eduard (2002). Assassination: Operation ANTHROPOID, 1941–1942. Prague: Ministry of Defence of the Czech Republic. ISBN 978-8-07278-1-584.
- Höhne, Heinz (2000) [1969]. The Order of the Death's Head: The Story of Hitler's SS. London: Penguin. ISBN 978-0-14-139012-3.
- Williams, Max (2003). Reinhard Heydrich: The Biography, Volume 2—Enigma. Church Stretton: Ulric Publishing. ISBN 978-0-9537577-6-3.
