= Moravian Thaya =

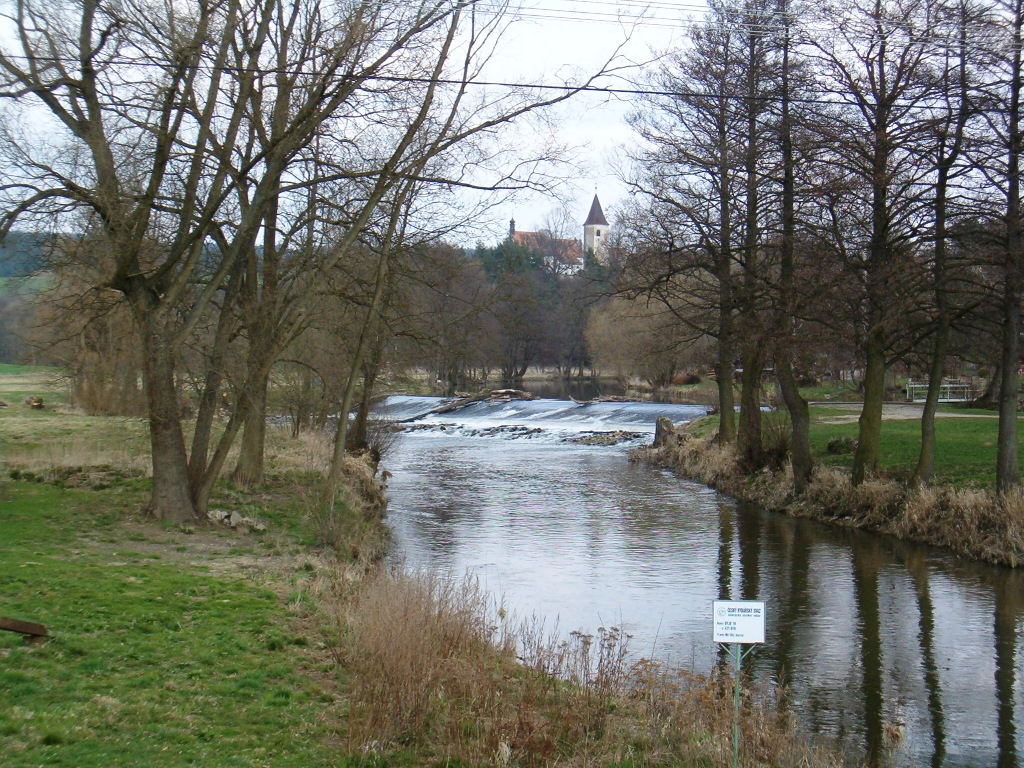
- Moravian Thaya in Písečné

Location
- Countries: Czech Republic; Austria
- Regions/ States: Vysočina; South Bohemian; Lower Austria

Physical characteristics
- Source
  - location: Panenská Rozsíčka, Křižanov Highlands
  - coordinates: 49°16′1″N 15°31′14″E
  - elevation: 657 m (2,156 ft)
- Mouth
  - location: Raabs an der Thaya
  - coordinates: 48°50′52″N 15°29′25″E
  - elevation: 400 m (1,300 ft)
- Length: 68.2 km (42.4 mi)
- Basin size: 630.3 km^{2} (243.4 sq mi)
- Discharge
  - average: 3.0 m^{3}/s (110 cu ft/s) near estuary

Basin features
- Progression: Thaya→ Morava→ Danube→ Black Sea

The Moravian Thaya (Czech: Moravská Dyje, German: Mährische Thaya) is a river in the Czech Republic and Austria, a left tributary of the Thaya River. It flows through the Vysočina and South Bohemian regions and through Lower Austria. It is 68.2 km (42.4 mi) long.

== Characteristic ==
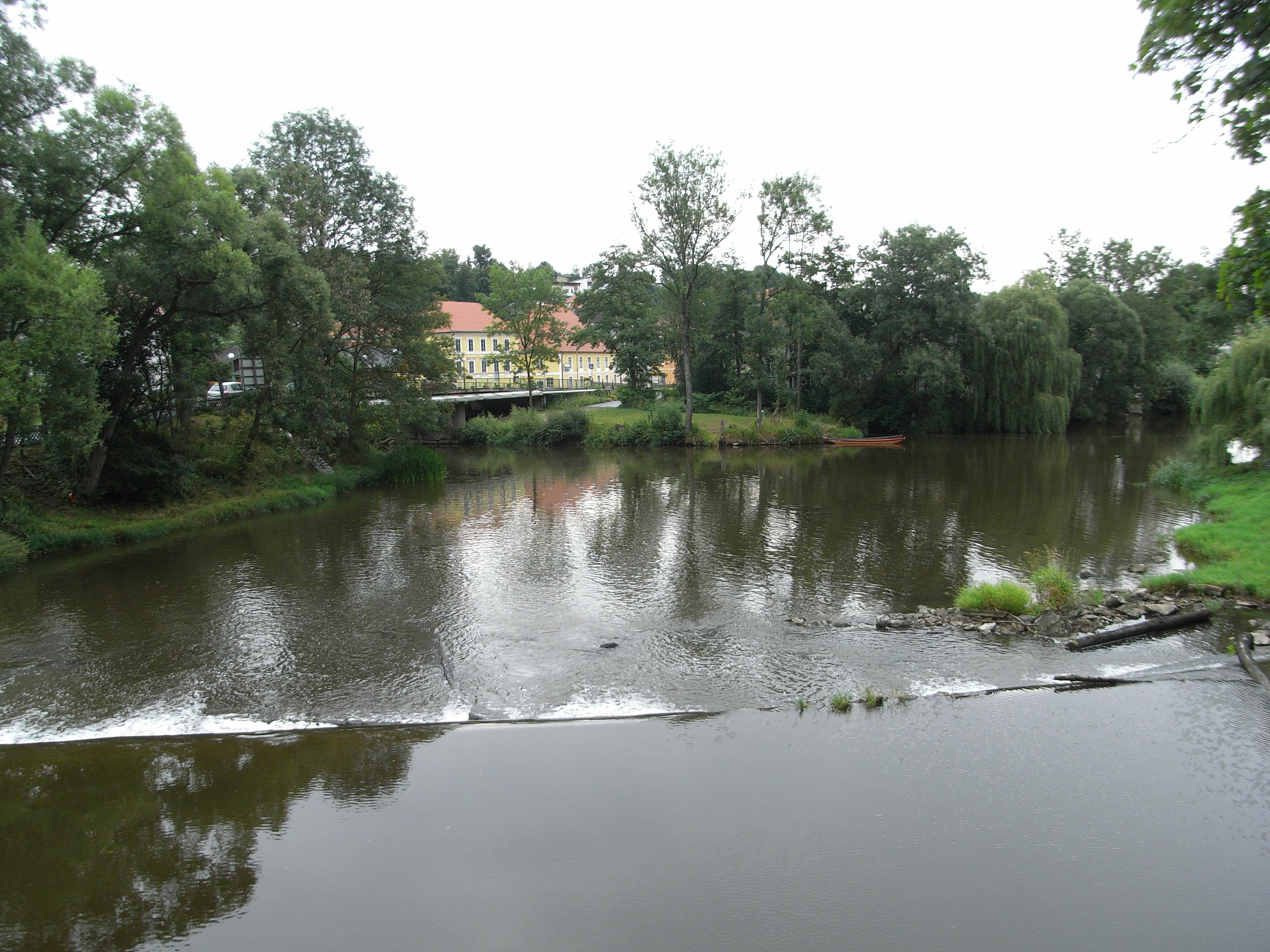
Confluence of the Moravian Thaya (left) and German Thaya

The Moravian Thaya originates in the territory of Panenská Rozsíčka in the Křižanov Highlands at an elevation of 657 m (2,156 ft) and flows to Raabs an der Thaya, where it enters the Thaya River at an elevation of 400 m (1,300 ft). It is 68.2 km (42.4 mi) long, of which 55.6 km (34.5 mi) is in the Czech Republic. Its drainage basin has an area of 630.3 km^{2} (243.4 sq mi), of which 561.7 km^{2} (216.9 sq mi) is in the Czech Republic.

The longest tributaries of the Moravian Thaya are:

Tributary	Length (km)	Side
Vápovka	28.6	left
Bolíkovský potok	25.7	left
Myslůvka	16.2	right
Volfířovský potok	11.6	right
Telčský potok	11.4	right

== Course ==
The largest town on the river is Dačice. The river flows past the municipalities of Panenská Rozsíčka, Bezděkov, Sedlejov, Urbanov, Žatec, Dyjice, Radkov and Černíč in the Vysočina Region, then it continues past Dačice, Cizkrajov, Staré Hobzí and Písečné in the South Bohemian Region before crossing the border into Austria.

In Austria, it enters the Raabs an der Thaya municipality and flows to the town proper of Raabs an der Thaya, where it joins the German Thaya. From there, the unified Thaya River flows generally eastward and re-enters the Czech Republic.

== Bodies of water ==
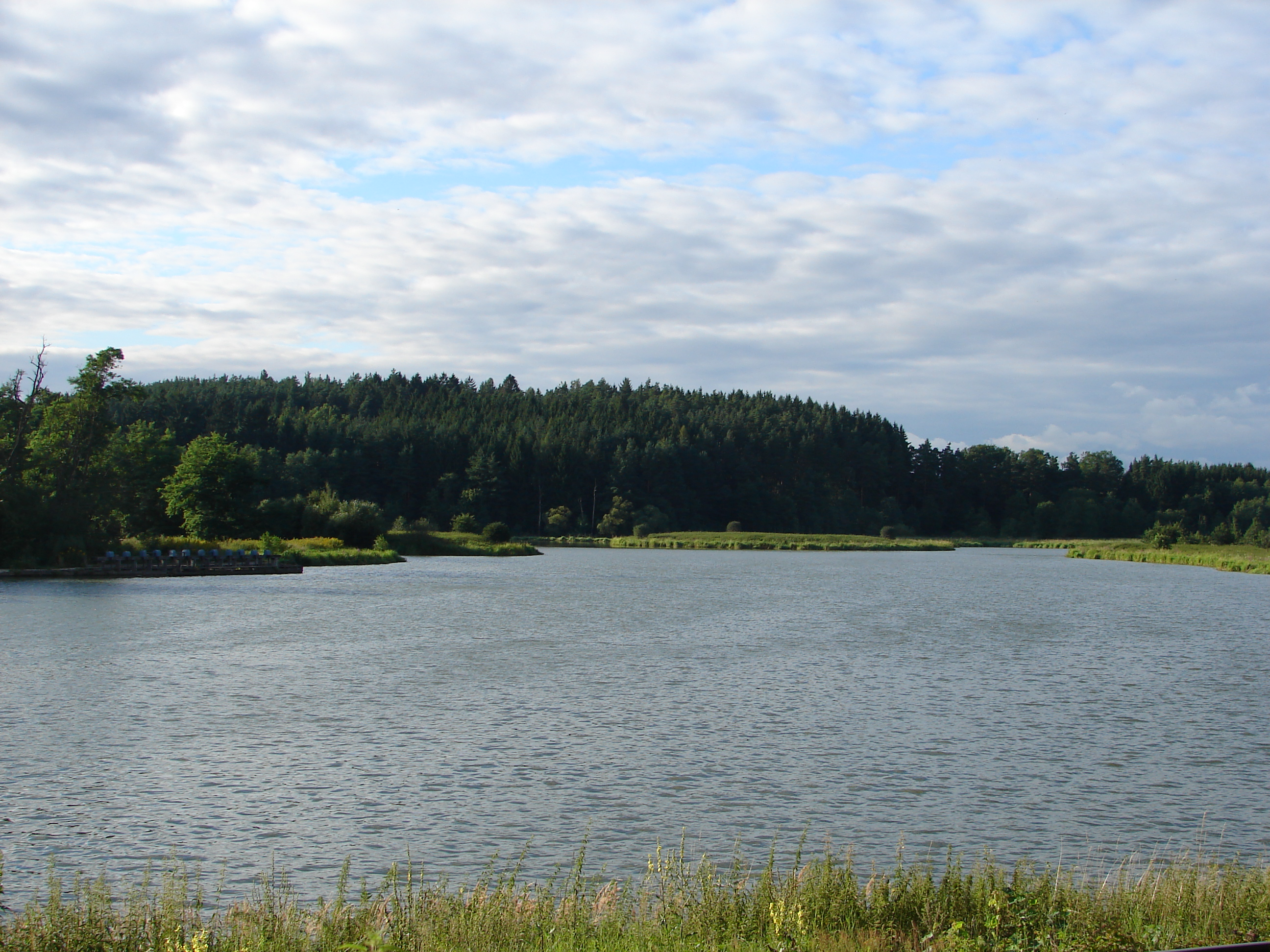
Černíčský rybník

The river supplies the fishpond Černíčský rybník and a small water reservoir called Ivanka. The largest body of water in the basin area is the Nová Říše Reservoir with an area of 45 ha (110 acres).

== Nature ==
About 24 kilometres (15 mi) of the river and its immediate surroundings between Dačice and the Czech–Austrian border are protected as Moravská Dyje Nature Monument. The protected area is 258.3 ha (638 acres). Among the protected species of animals found here are the Eurasian otter, Amur bitterling, schneider and European crayfish.

In the Czech part of the river, 21 species of aquatic molluscs were found: 13 species of freshwater snails and eight species of bivalves. Bivalves in the river include duck mussel, painter's mussel, and the endangered thick shelled river mussel (sensu lato).

== See also ==
- List of rivers of the Czech Republic
- List of rivers of Austria
