= Vrbice =

Vrbice may refer to places in the Czech Republic:

- Vrbice (Břeclav District), a municipality and village in the South Moravian Region
- Vrbice (Jičín District), a municipality and village in the Hradec Králové Region
- Vrbice (Karlovy Vary District), a municipality and village in the Karlovy Vary Region
- Vrbice (Litoměřice District), a municipality and village in the Ústí nad Labem Region
- Vrbice (Nymburk District), a municipality and village in the Central Bohemian Region
- Vrbice (Prachatice District), a municipality and village in the South Bohemian Region
- Vrbice (Rychnov nad Kněžnou District), a municipality and village in the Hradec Králové Region
- Vrbice (Bohumín), a village and part of Bohumín in the Moravian-Silesian Region
- Vrbice, a village and part of Hořovičky in the Central Bohemian Region
- Vrbice, a village and part of Hracholusky (Prachatice District) in the South Bohemian Region
- Vrbice, a village and part of Krásná Hora nad Vltavou in the Central Bohemian Region
- Vrbice, a village and part of Leština u Světlé in the South Bohemian Region
- Vrbice, a village and part of Mšené-lázně in the Ústí nad Labem Region
- Vrbice u Bezdružic, a village and part of Lestkov (Tachov District) in the Plzeň Region
- Vrbice u Stříbra, a village and part of Kladruby (Tachov District) in the Plzeň Region
