= Štěpánov (disambiguation) =

Štěpánov is a town in the Olomouc Region of the Czech Republic.

Štěpánov may also refer to other places in the Czech Republic:

- Štěpánov, a hamlet and part of Bezděkov (Havlíčkův Brod District) in the Vysočina Region
- Štěpánov, a village and part of Leština u Světlé in the Vysočina Region
- Štěpánov, a village and part of Lukov (Teplice District) in the Ústí nad Labem Region
- Štěpánov, a village and part of Přelouč in the Pardubice Region
- Štěpánov, a village and part of Skuteč in the Pardubice Region
- Štěpánov nad Svratkou, a market town in the Vysočina Region
- Horní Štěpánov, a municipality and village in the Olomouc Region
- Trhový Štěpánov, a town in the Central Bohemian Region
