= Písečné =

Písečné may refer to places in the Czech Republic:

- Písečné (Jindřichův Hradec District), a municipality and village in the South Bohemian Region
- Písečné (Žďár nad Sázavou District), a municipality and village in the Vysočina Region
