= Leština =

Leština may refer to:

== Places in the Czech Republic ==
- Leština (Šumperk District), a municipality and village in the Olomouc Region
- Leština (Ústí nad Orlicí District), a municipality and village in the Pardubice Region
- Leština u Světlé, a municipality and village in the Vysočina Region
- Leština, a village and part of Kozlov (Havlíčkův Brod District) in the Vysočina Region
- Leština, a village and part of Malé Březno (Ústí nad Labem District) in the Ústí nad Labem Region
- Leština, a village and part of Markvartice (Jičín District) in the Hradec Králové Region
- Leština, a village and part of Slapsko in the South Bohemian Region
- Leština, a village and part of Strmilov in the Vysočina Region

== People ==
- Karel Leština (born 1973), Czech sprint canoer

== See also ==
- Leštinka (disambiguation)
