= Leštinka =

Leštinka may refer to places in the Czech Republic:

- Leštinka (Chrudim District), a municipality and village in the Pardubice Region
- Leštinka, a village and part of Světlá nad Sázavou in the Vysočina Region

== See also ==
- Leština (disambiguation)
