= Sedlejov =

- Municipality
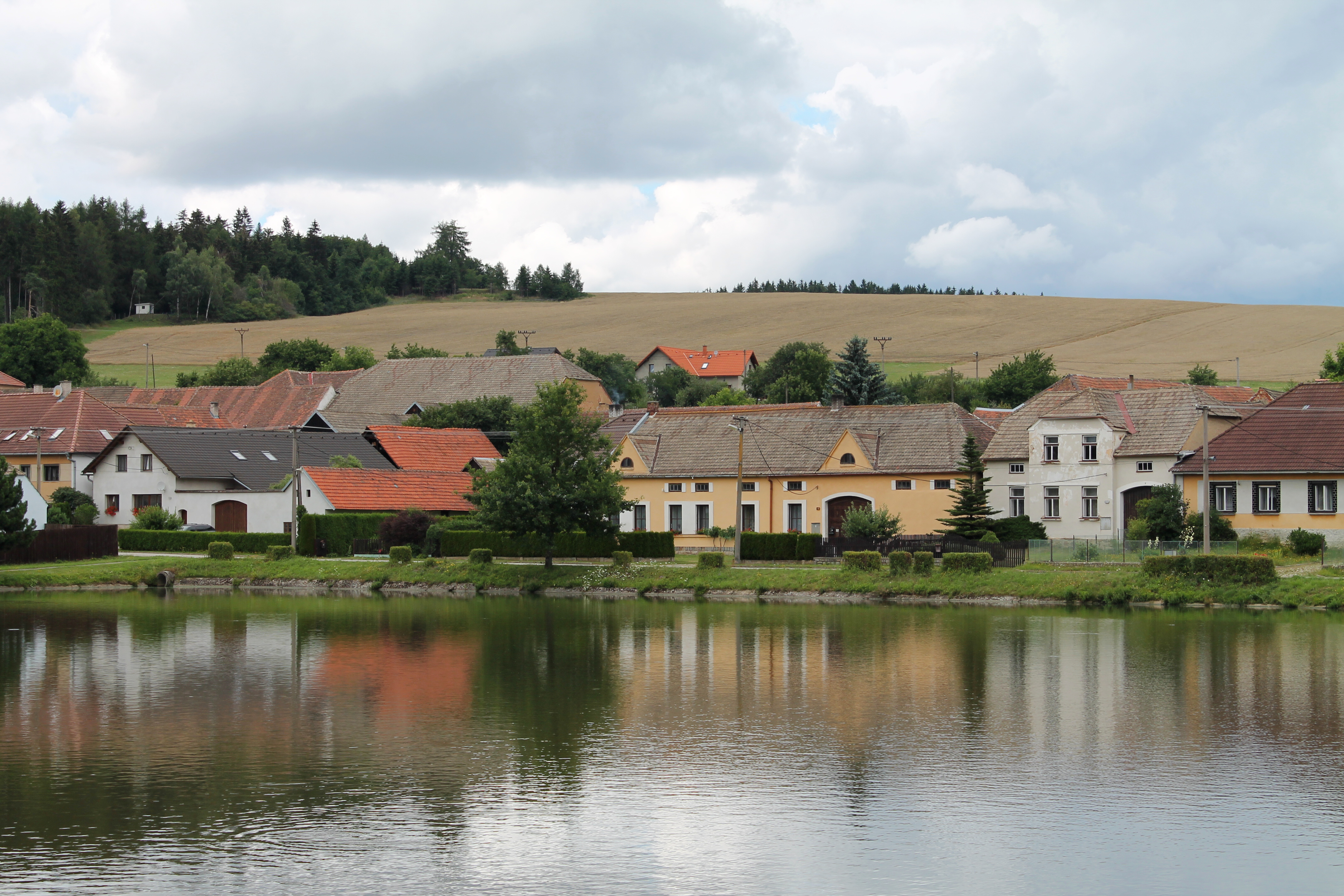
- Centre of Sedlejov with a pond

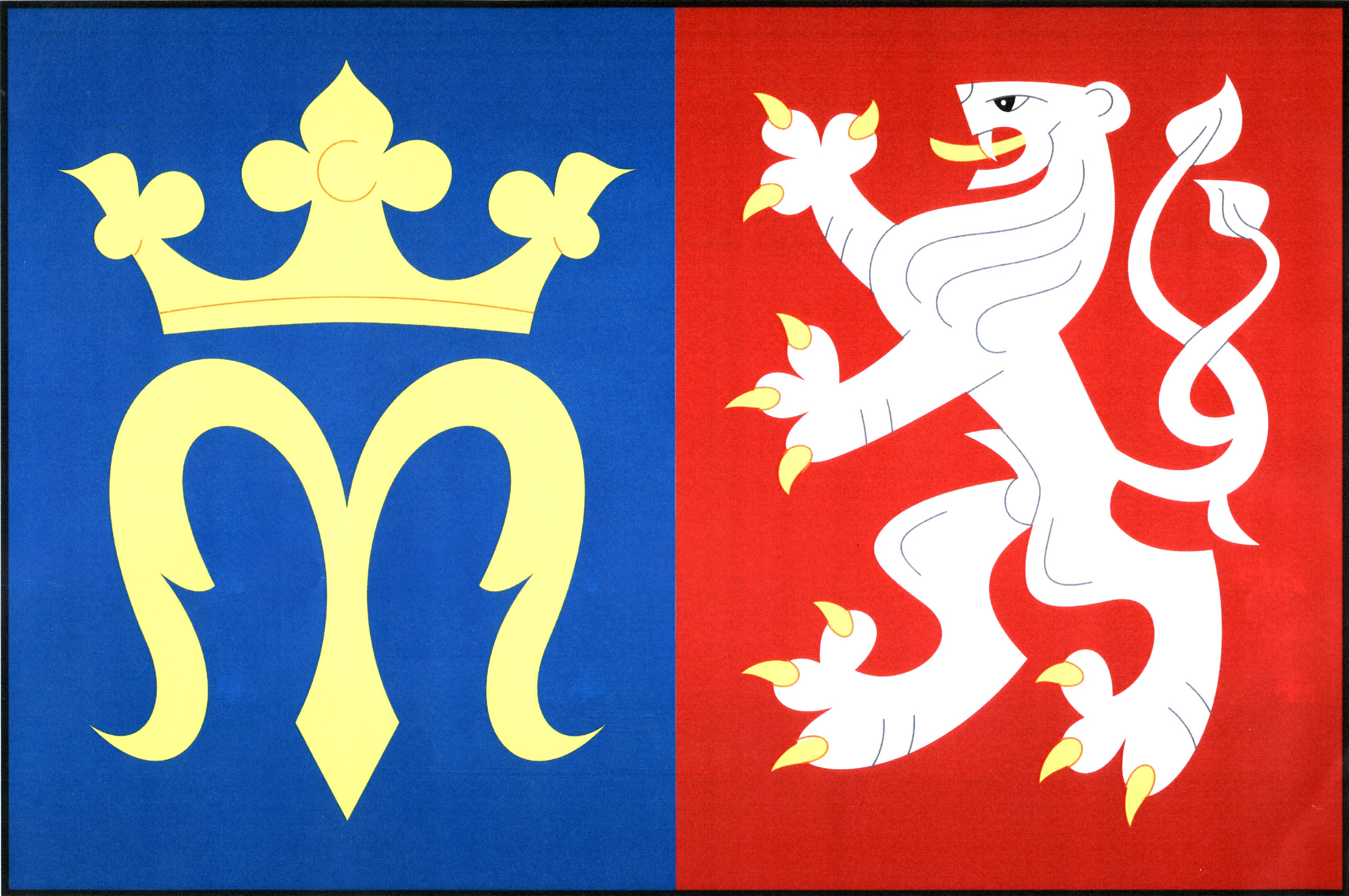
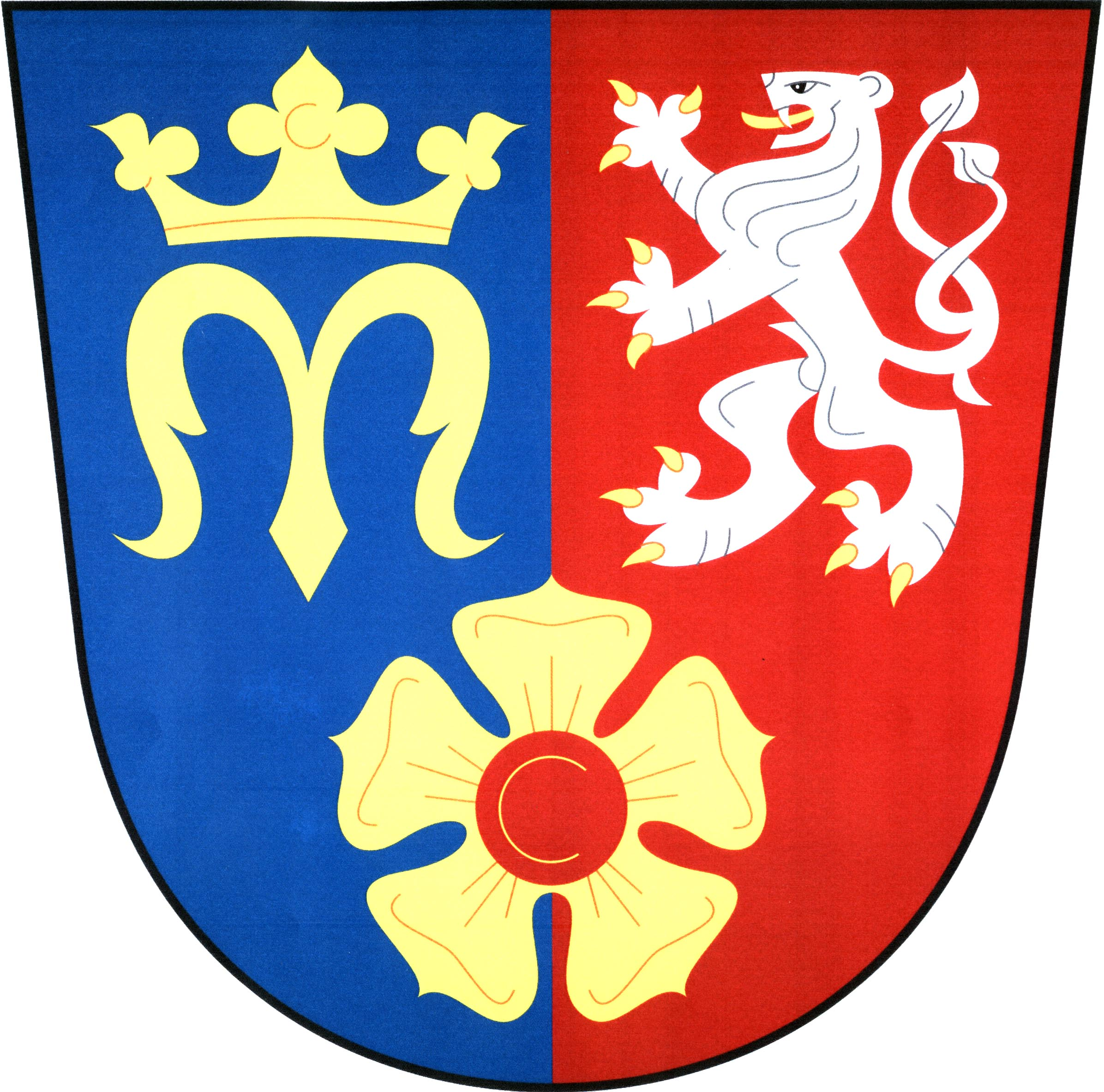
- Flag Coat of arms

- Location in the Czech Republic
- Coordinates: 49°13′39″N 15°29′44″E
- Country: Czech Republic
- Region: Vysočina
- District: Jihlava
- First mentioned: 1366

Area
  - Total: 7.49 km^{2} (2.89 sq mi)
- Elevation: 556 m (1,824 ft)

Population (2026-01-01)
  - Total: 322
  - Density: 43.0/km^{2} (111/sq mi)
- Time zone: UTC+1 (CET)
  - Summer (DST): UTC+2 (CEST)
- Postal code: 588 62
- Website: www.sedlejov.cz

Sedlejov (Czech pronunciation: [ˈsɛdlɛjof]) is a municipality and village in Jihlava District in the Vysočina Region of the Czech Republic. It has about 300 inhabitants.

== Etymology ==
The name is derived from the personal name Sedlej, meaning "Sedlej's (property)".

== Geography ==
Sedlejov is located about 20 kilometres (12 mi) south of Jihlava. It lies in the Křižanov Highlands. The highest point is a nameless hill at 651 m (2,136 ft) above sea level. The Moravian Thaya River flows along the eastern municipal border. There are several small fishponds in the municipal territory, including two fishponds inside the built-up area.

== History ==
The first written mention of Sedlejov is from 1366. For its entire feudal history, it belonged to the Telč estate.

== Demographics ==
Historical population

Year	Pop.	±%
1869	276	—
1880	295	+6.9%
1890	302	+2.4%
1900	322	+6.6%
1910	325	+0.9%

Year	Pop.	±%
1921	330	+1.5%
1930	301	−8.8%
1950	292	−3.0%
1961	289	−1.0%
1970	274	−5.2%

Year	Pop.	±%
1980	219	−20.1%
1991	258	+17.8%
2001	273	+5.8%
2011	266	−2.6%
2021	294	+10.5%

Source: Censuses

== Transport ==
Sedlejov is located on the railway line Havlíčkův Brod–Slavonice.

== Sights ==
The only protected cultural monument in the municipality is a memorial stone from 1648.
