= Panenská Rozsíčka =

- Municipality
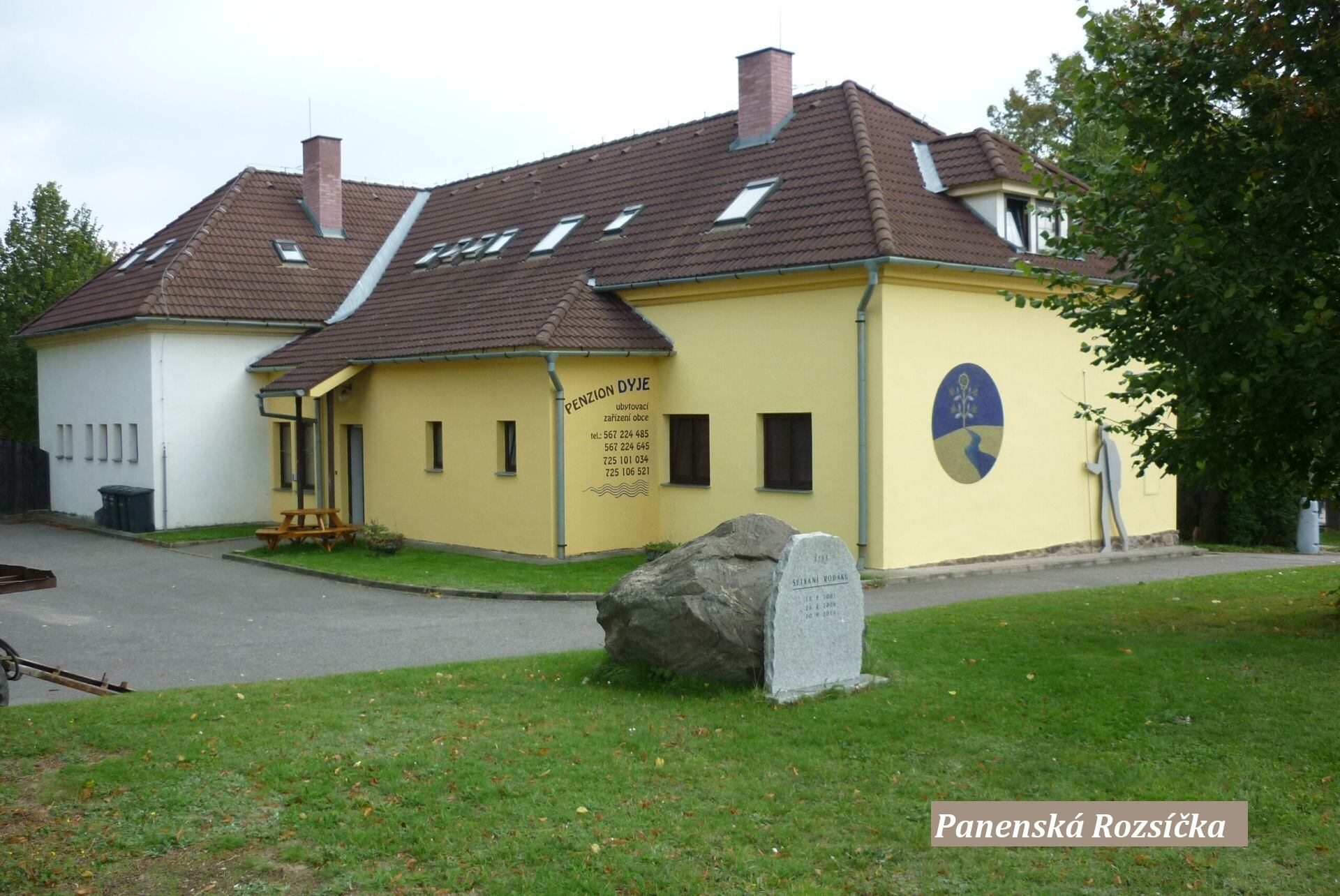
- Guesthouse

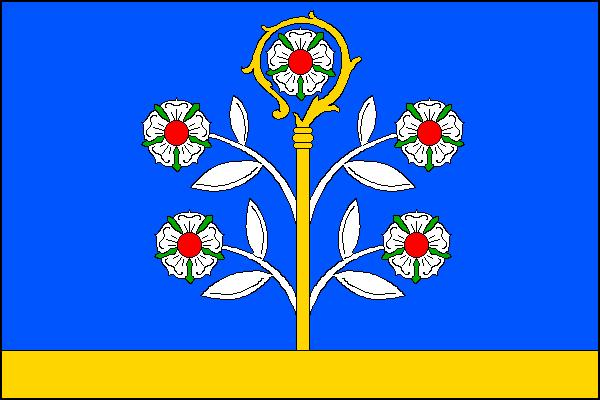
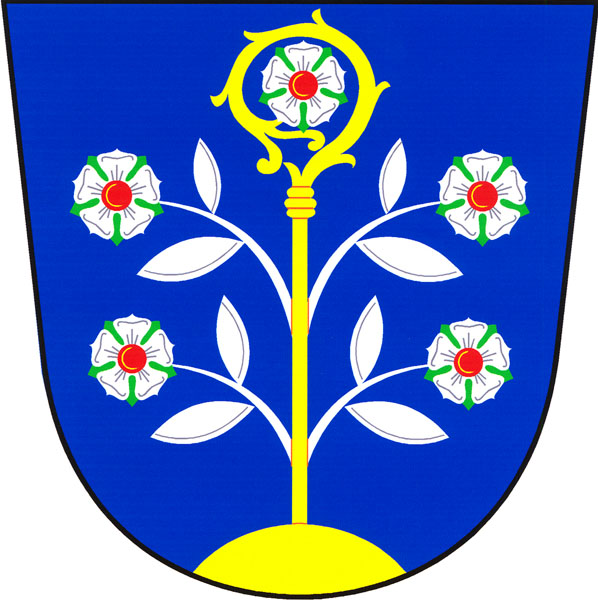
- Flag Coat of arms

- Location in the Czech Republic
- Coordinates: 49°15′9″N 15°30′54″E
- Country: Czech Republic
- Region: Vysočina
- District: Jihlava
- First mentioned: 1351

Area
  - Total: 4.41 km^{2} (1.70 sq mi)
- Elevation: 607 m (1,991 ft)

Population (2026-01-01)
  - Total: 219
  - Density: 49.7/km^{2} (129/sq mi)
- Time zone: UTC+1 (CET)
  - Summer (DST): UTC+2 (CEST)
- Postal code: 589 01
- Website: panenskarozsicka.cz

Panenská Rozsíčka (Czech pronunciation: [ˈpanɛnskaː ˈros.siːtʃka]) is a municipality and village in Jihlava District in the Vysočina Region of the Czech Republic. It has about 200 inhabitants.

== Geography ==
Panenská Rozsíčka is located about 17 kilometres (11 mi) south of Jihlava. It lies in the Křižanov Highlands. The highest point is the Hřeben hill at 678 m (2,224 ft) above sea level. The Moravian Thaya River originates in the northern part of the municipal territory, then flows along the eastern municipal border.

== History ==
The first written mention of Panenská Rozsíčka is from 1351.

== Demographics ==
Historical population

Year	Pop.	±%
1869	198	—
1880	243	+22.7%
1890	250	+2.9%
1900	247	−1.2%
1910	251	+1.6%

Year	Pop.	±%
1921	222	−11.6%
1930	186	−16.2%
1950	142	−23.7%
1961	130	−8.5%
1970	133	+2.3%

Year	Pop.	±%
1980	99	−25.6%
1991	80	−19.2%
2001	89	+11.3%
2011	152	+70.8%
2021	206	+35.5%

Source: Censuses

== Transport ==
There are no railways or major roads passing through the municipality.

== Sights ==
There are no protected cultural monuments in the municipality.
