= Jindřich Nermuť =

Member of the Constituent National Assembly
- In office 1946–1948

Member of the Interim National Assembly
- In office 1945–1946

Personal details
- Born: 25 February 1917 Leštinka, Bohemia, AUstria-Hungary
- Died: 1 March 1990 (aged 73) Launceston, Tasmania, Australia
- Party: Czechoslovak People's Party; Democratic Labor Party
- Occupation: Farmer

Jindřich Nermuť (25 February 1917 – 1 March 1990) was a Czech politician and exile.

== Early life ==
Nermuť was born on 25 February 1917 in Leštinka, Bohemia. His father was a farmer and served as village mayor as part of the Agrarian Party. As a young man he was a vice-president of the national Catholic youth organisation.

== Czech politics ==
Nermuť was a member of the Czechoslovak People's Party and served in the Interim National Assembly from 1945 to 1946. He then served in the Constituent National Assembly from the 1946 parliamentary election until its dissolution in 1948 following the Communist coup.

Nermuť was anti-communist and was said to be a leading public critic of Communist Party agriculture minister Július Ďuriš's collectivisation policies. In 1947 he helped organise a farmers' protest on Kunětická hora, which was attended by an estimated 50,000 people.

== Exile and life in Australia ==
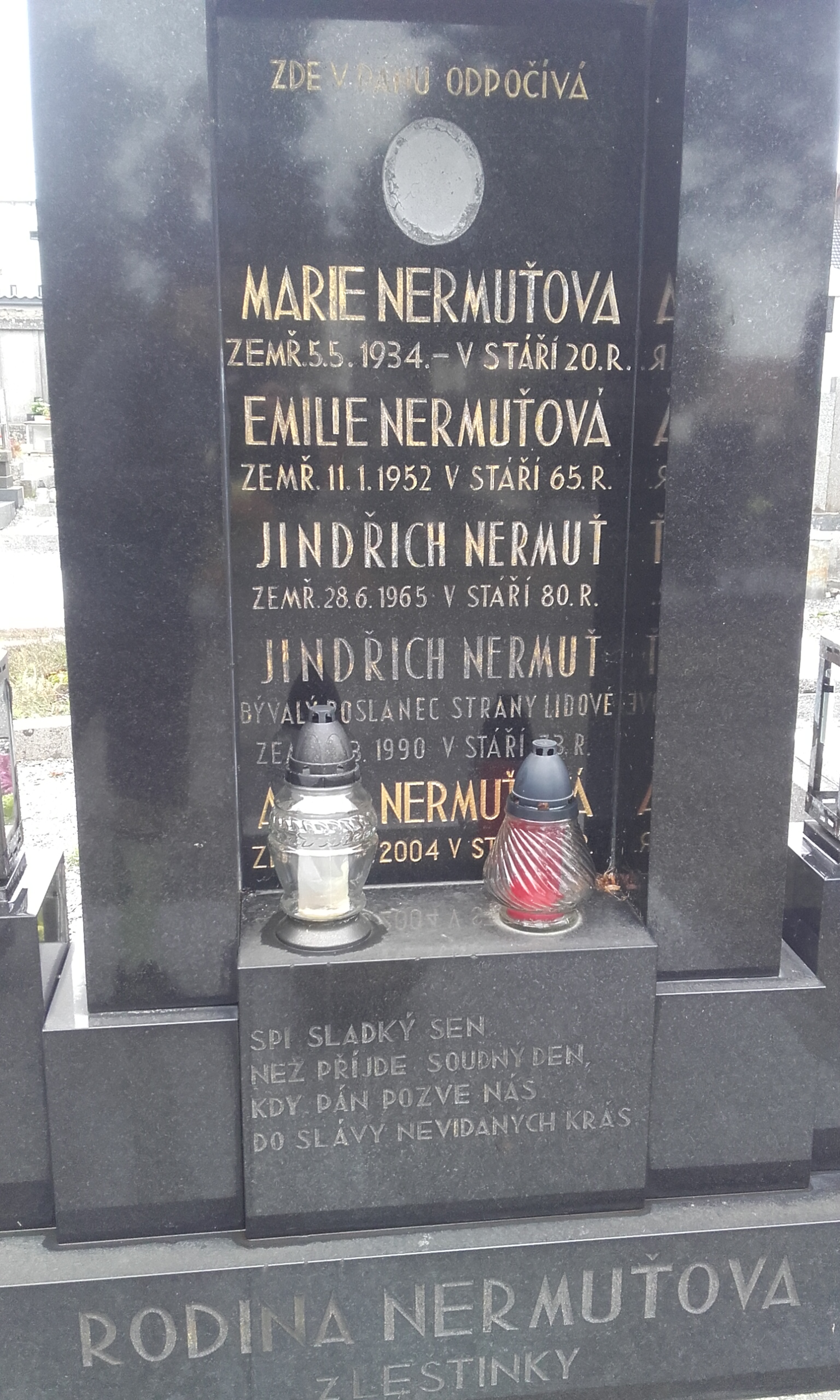
Memorial for Nermuť and family members in Skuteč

Nermuť left Czechoslovakia following the communist coup, living for periods in Germany and Luxembourg before moving to Australia. He settled in Tasmania where he worked as a labourer and eventually started a construction company. He became an Australian citizen in 1970 and twice stood for parliament as a candidate of the anti-communist Democratic Labor Party: in Bass at the 1972 election and for the Senate at the 1974 election.

Nermuť was active in Czech exile organisations and served on the international council of the Rada svobodného Československa ('Council of Free Czechoslovakia'). He visited Czechoslovakia following the Velvet Revolution in 1989. He died on 1 March 1990 in Launceston, Tasmania.
