= Písečné (Žďár nad Sázavou District) =

- Municipality
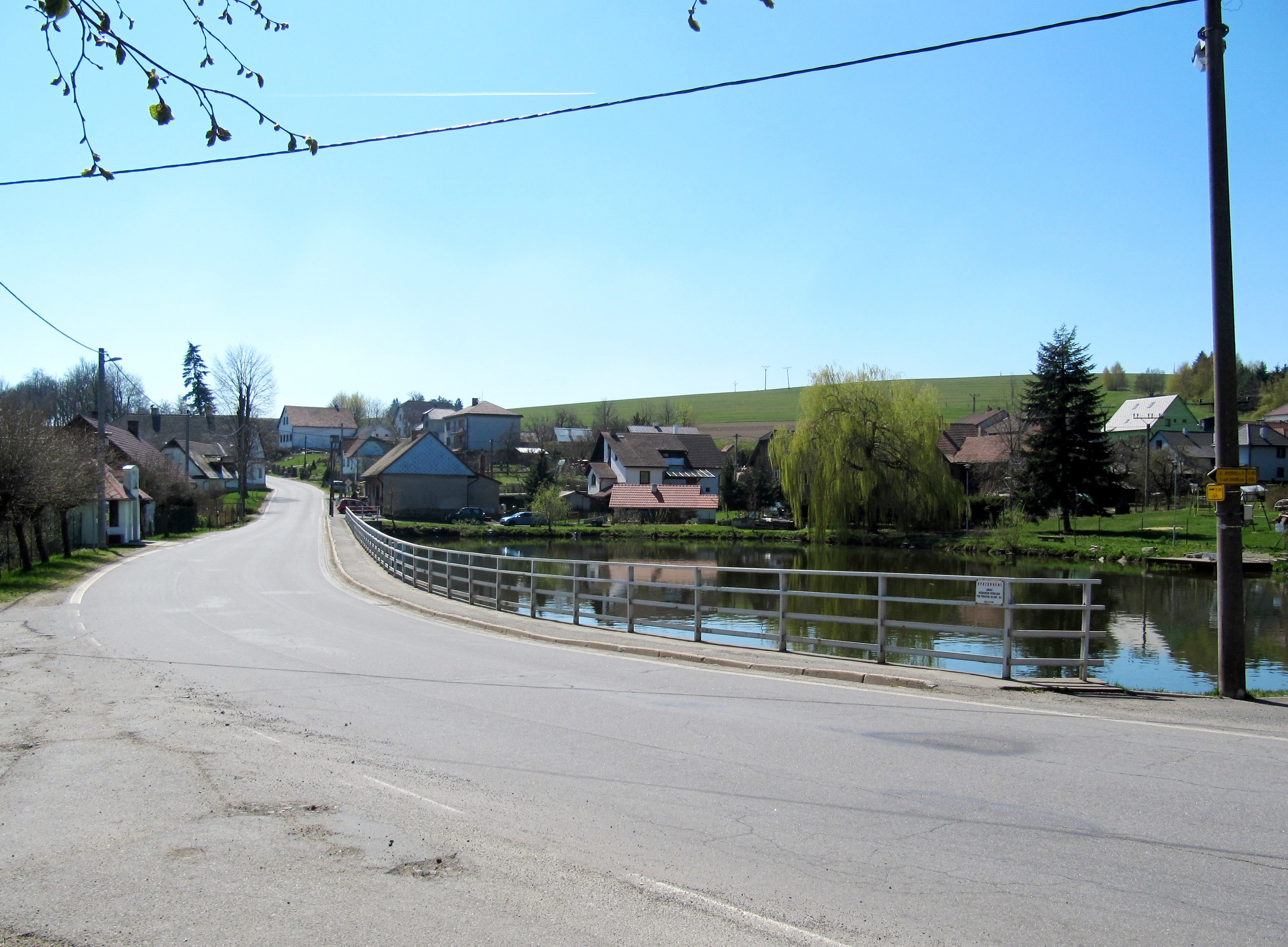
- Centre of Písečné

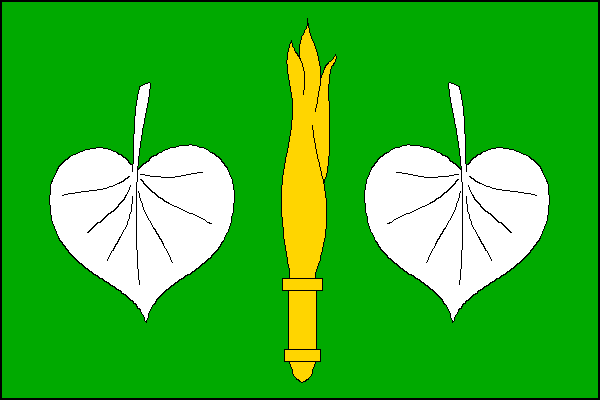
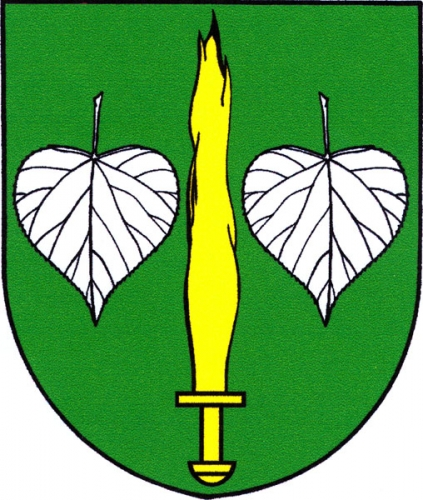
- Flag Coat of arms

- Location in the Czech Republic
- Coordinates: 49°34′5″N 16°14′12″E
- Country: Czech Republic
- Region: Vysočina
- District: Žďár nad Sázavou
- First mentioned: 1297

Area
  - Total: 6.58 km^{2} (2.54 sq mi)
- Elevation: 614 m (2,014 ft)

Population (2026-01-01)
  - Total: 193
  - Density: 29.3/km^{2} (76.0/sq mi)
- Time zone: UTC+1 (CET)
  - Summer (DST): UTC+2 (CEST)
- Postal code: 593 01
- Website: obec-pisecne.cz

Písečné is a municipality and village in Žďár nad Sázavou District in the Vysočina Region of the Czech Republic. It has about 200 inhabitants.

Písečné lies approximately 22 kilometres (14 mi) east of Žďár nad Sázavou, 51 km (32 mi) east of Jihlava, and 143 km (89 mi) south-east of Prague.

== Demographics ==
Historical population
Year	Pop.	±%
1869	266	—
1880	284	+6.8%
1890	293	+3.2%
1900	277	−5.5%
1910	290	+4.7%
1921	289	−0.3%
1930	282	−2.4%
1950	223	−20.9%
1961	231	+3.6%
1970	220	−4.8%
1980	210	−4.5%
1991	211	+0.5%
2001	212	+0.5%
2011	177	−16.5%
2021	157	−11.3%
Source: Censuses
