= Vrbice (Litoměřice District) =

- Municipality
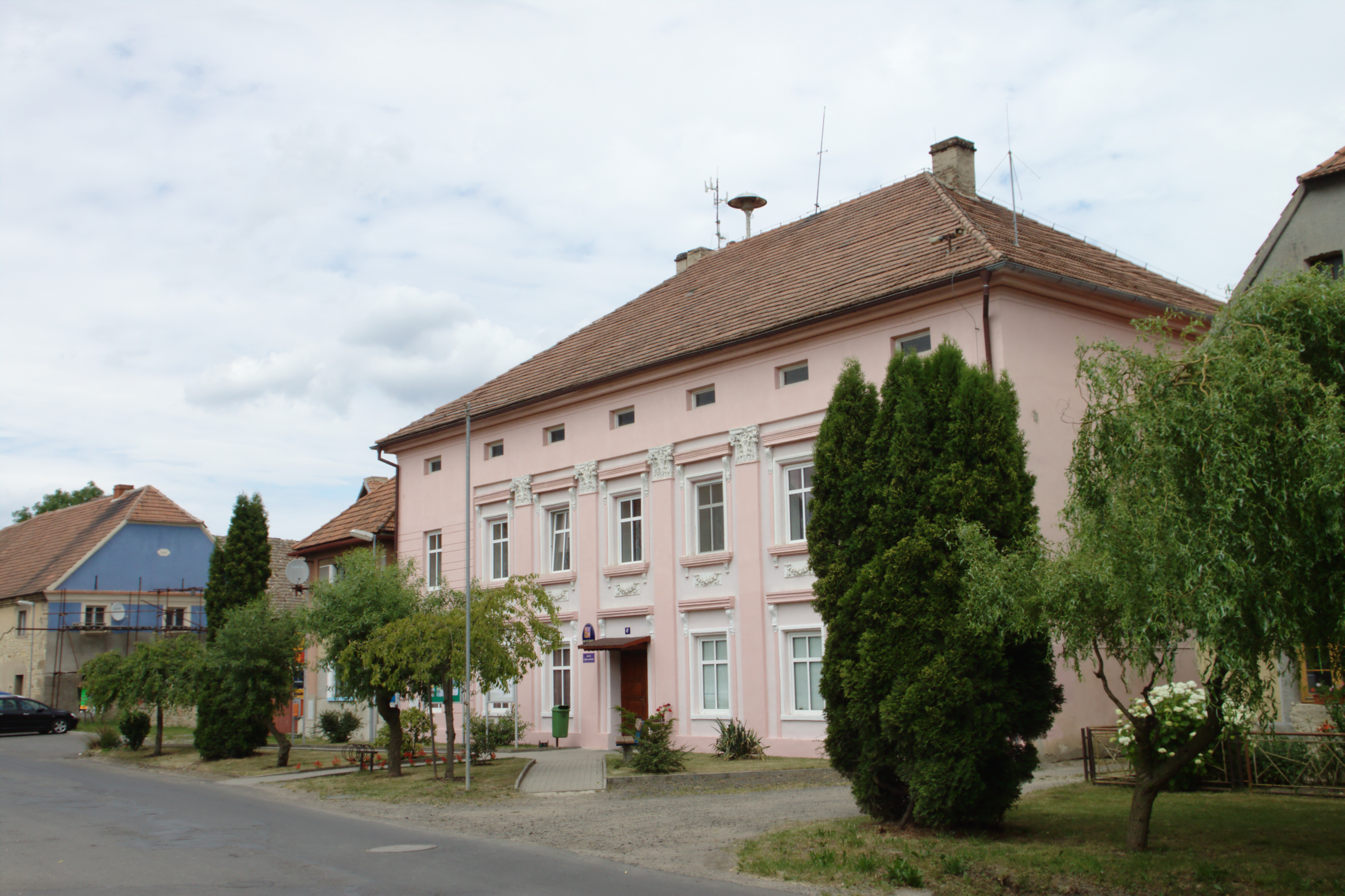
- Municipal office

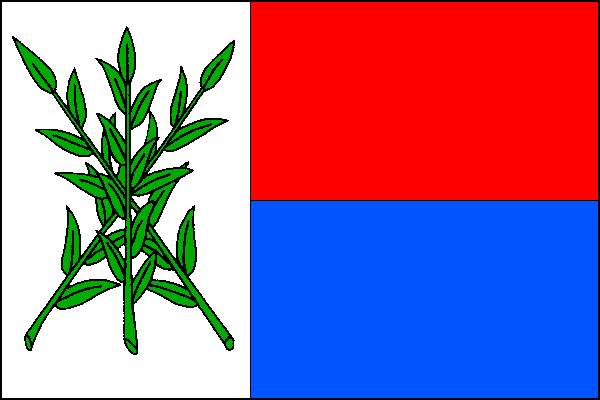
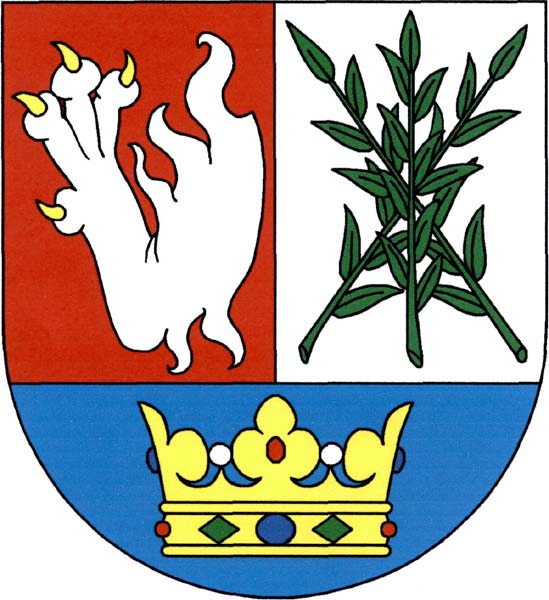
- Flag Coat of arms

- Location in the Czech Republic
- Coordinates: 50°29′0″N 14°17′12″E
- Country: Czech Republic
- Region: Ústí nad Labem
- District: Litoměřice
- First mentioned: 1319

Area
  - Total: 10.74 km^{2} (4.15 sq mi)
- Elevation: 164 m (538 ft)

Population (2026-01-01)
  - Total: 600
  - Density: 56/km^{2} (140/sq mi)
- Time zone: UTC+1 (CET)
  - Summer (DST): UTC+2 (CEST)
- Postal codes: 411 64, 413 01
- Website: www.vrbice.net

Vrbice is a municipality and village in Litoměřice District in the Ústí nad Labem Region of the Czech Republic. It has about 600 inhabitants.

Vrbice lies approximately 14 kilometres (9 mi) south-east of Litoměřice, 26 km (16 mi) south-east of Ústí nad Labem, and 46 km (29 mi) north of Prague.

== Administrative division ==
Vrbice consists of three municipal parts (in brackets population according to the 2021 census):

- Vrbice (252)
- Mastířovice (16)
- Vetlá (266)

== Demographics ==
Historical population
Year	Pop.	±%
1869	830	—
1880	847	+2.0%
1890	907	+7.1%
1900	873	−3.7%
1910	915	+4.8%
1921	905	−1.1%
1930	882	−2.5%
1950	597	−32.3%
1961	608	+1.8%
1970	567	−6.7%
1980	569	+0.4%
1991	431	−24.3%
2001	430	−0.2%
2011	461	+7.2%
2021	534	+15.8%
Source: Censuses
