= Slapsko =

- Municipality
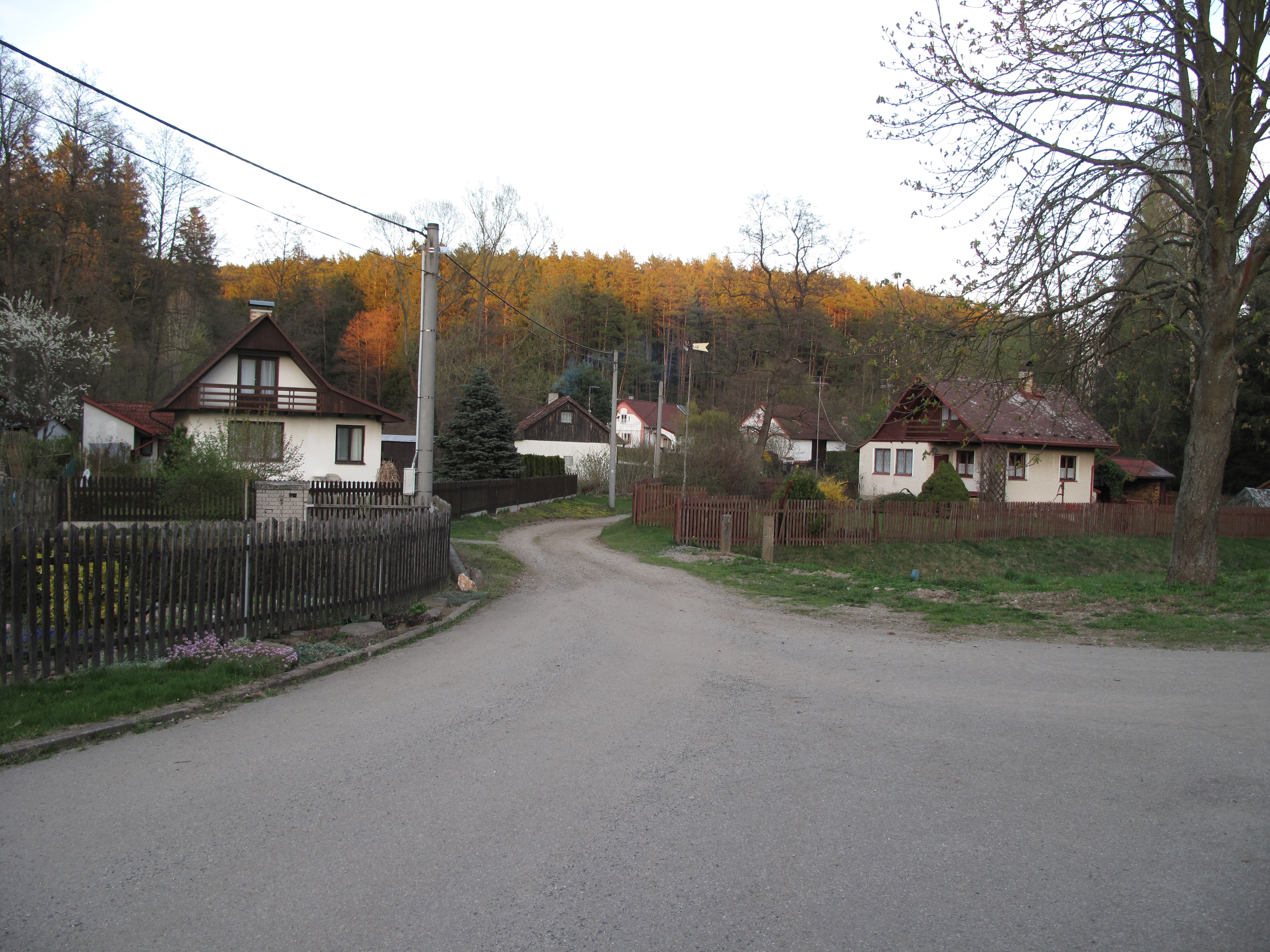
- Slupy, a part of Slapsko

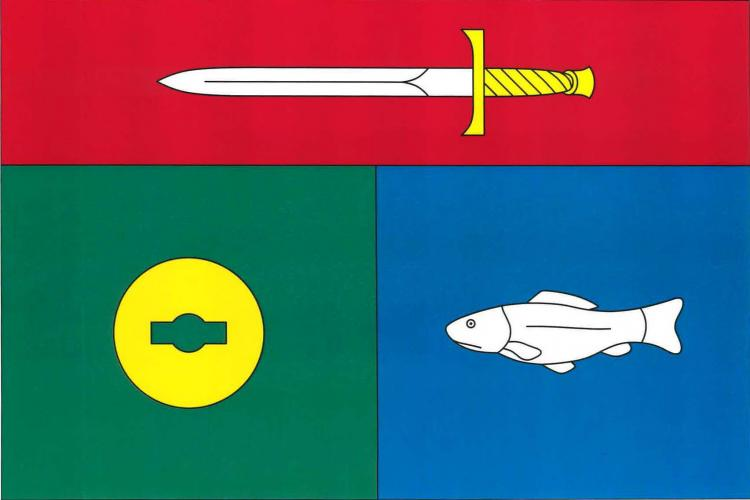
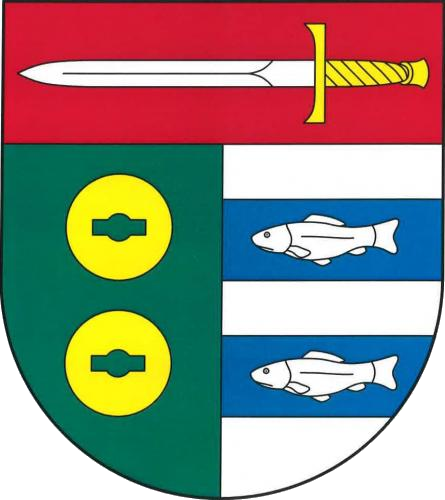
- Flag Coat of arms

- Location in the Czech Republic
- Coordinates: 49°34′31″N 14°45′46″E
- Country: Czech Republic
- Region: South Bohemian
- District: Tábor
- First mentioned: 1405

Area
  - Total: 9.09 km^{2} (3.51 sq mi)
- Elevation: 465 m (1,526 ft)

Population (2026-01-01)
  - Total: 131
  - Density: 14.4/km^{2} (37.3/sq mi)
- Time zone: UTC+1 (CET)
  - Summer (DST): UTC+2 (CEST)
- Postal code: 391 43
- Website: slapsko.cz

Slapsko is a municipality and village in Tábor District in the South Bohemian Region of the Czech Republic. It has about 100 inhabitants.

Slapsko lies approximately 20 kilometres (12 mi) north of Tábor, 70 km (43 mi) north of České Budějovice, and 62 km (39 mi) south-east of Prague.

== Administrative division ==
Slapsko consists of seven municipal parts (in brackets population according to the 2021 census):

- Slapsko (40)
- Javor (8)
- Leština (16)
- Moraveč (38)
- Slupy (7)
- Vitanovice (24)
- Zahrádka (17)

== Demographics ==
Historical population
| Year | Pop. | ±% |
|---|---|---|
| 1869 | 488 | — |
| 1880 | 551 | +12.9% |
| 1890 | 467 | −15.2% |
| 1900 | 468 | +0.2% |
| 1910 | 451 | −3.6% |
| 1921 | 464 | +2.9% |
| 1930 | 387 | −16.6% |
| 1950 | 283 | −26.9% |
| 1961 | 266 | −6.0% |
| 1970 | 243 | −8.6% |
| 1980 | 199 | −18.1% |
| 1991 | 151 | −24.1% |
| 2001 | 131 | −13.2% |
| 2011 | 153 | +16.8% |
| 2021 | 150 | −2.0% |
Source: Censuses
