= Vrbice (Jičín District) =

- Municipality
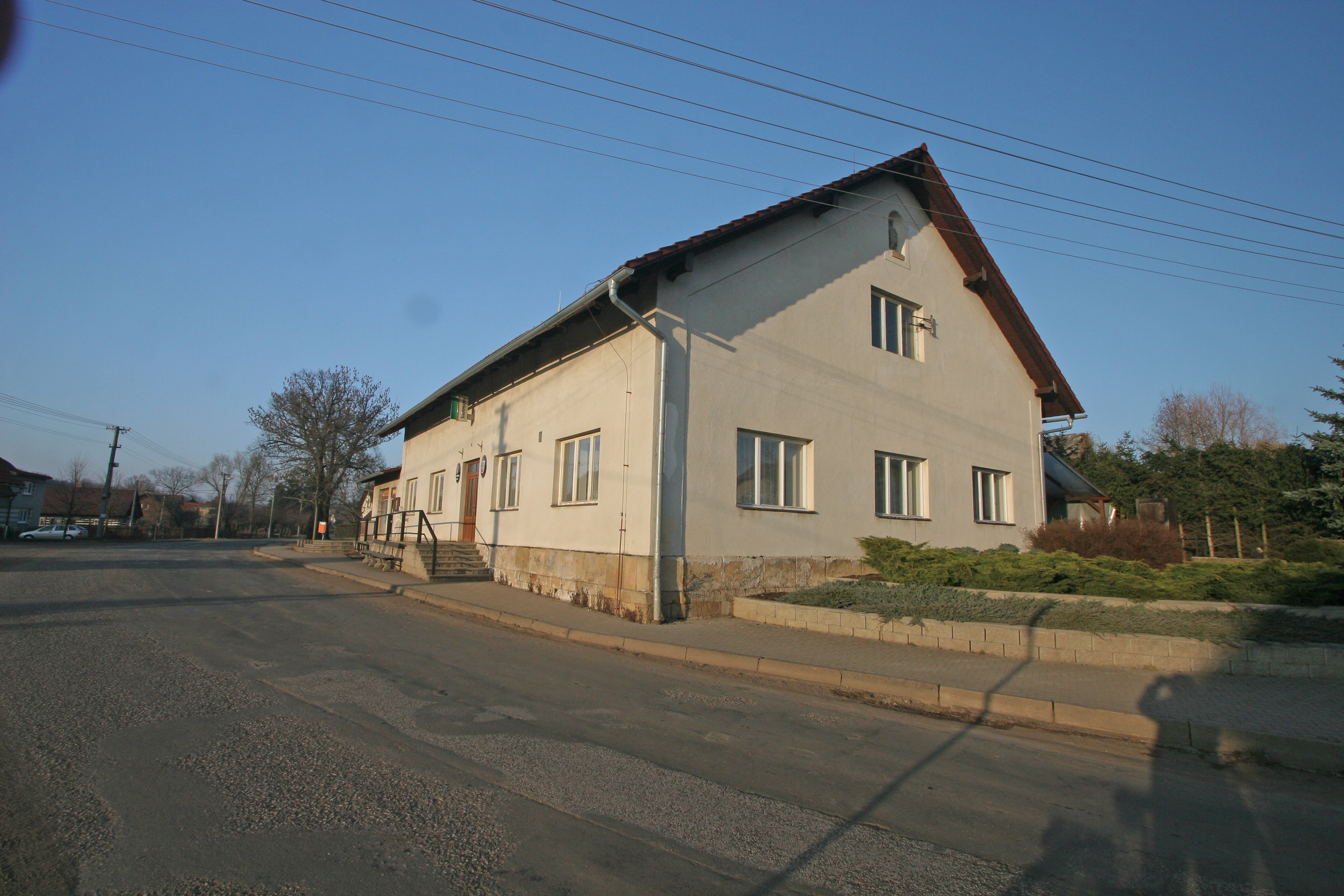
- Municipal office

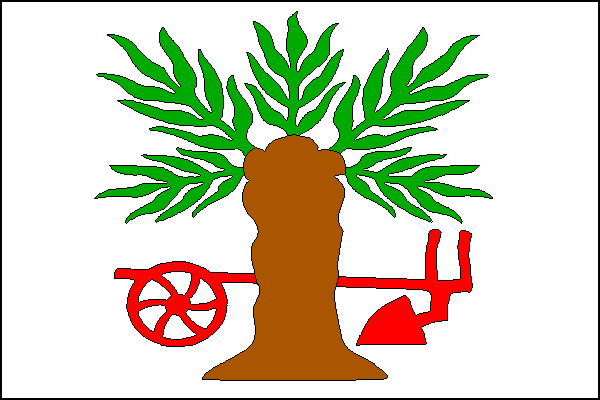
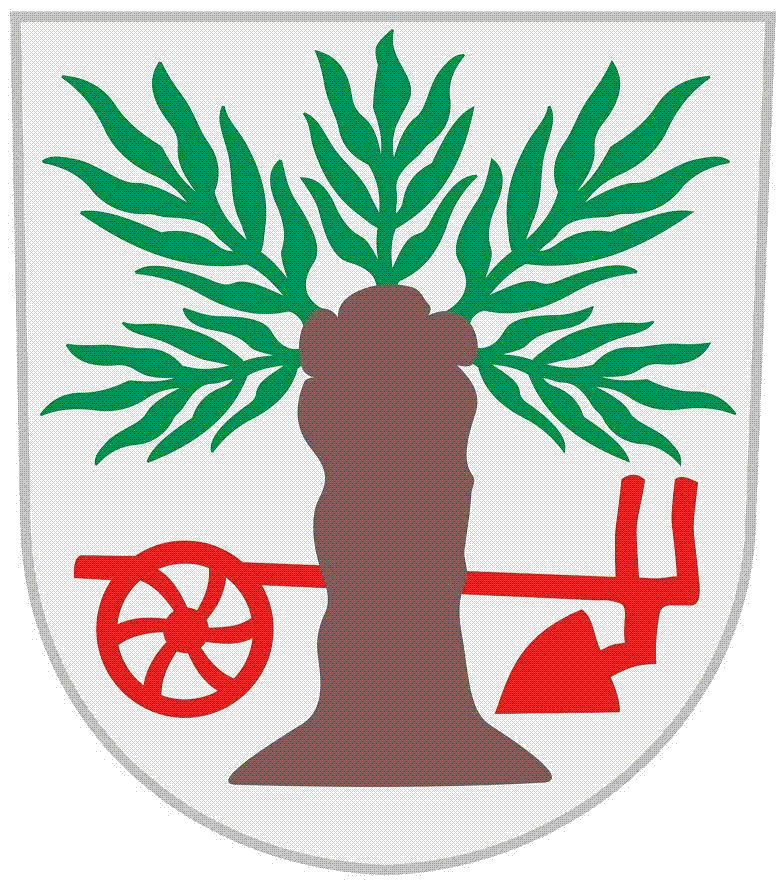
- Flag Coat of arms

- Location in the Czech Republic
- Coordinates: 50°22′9″N 15°25′44″E
- Country: Czech Republic
- Region: Hradec Králové
- District: Jičín
- First mentioned: 1368

Area
  - Total: 6.66 km^{2} (2.57 sq mi)
- Elevation: 252 m (827 ft)

Population (2026-01-01)
  - Total: 165
  - Density: 24.8/km^{2} (64.2/sq mi)
- Time zone: UTC+1 (CET)
  - Summer (DST): UTC+2 (CEST)
- Postal code: 507 03
- Website: www.vrbice-jc.cz

Vrbice is a municipality and village in Jičín District in the Hradec Králové Region of the Czech Republic. It has about 200 inhabitants.

== Administrative division ==
Vrbice consists of two municipal parts (in brackets population according to the 2021 census):

- Vrbice (114)
- Stříbrnice (48)

== Demographics ==
Historical population
Year	Pop.	±%
1869	709	—
1880	641	−9.6%
1890	676	+5.5%
1900	597	−11.7%
1910	598	+0.2%
1921	540	−9.7%
1930	498	−7.8%
1950	372	−25.3%
1961	331	−11.0%
1970	254	−23.3%
1980	206	−18.9%
1991	138	−33.0%
2001	121	−12.3%
2011	117	−3.3%
2021	162	+38.5%
Source: Censuses
