= Žatec (Jihlava District) =

- Municipality
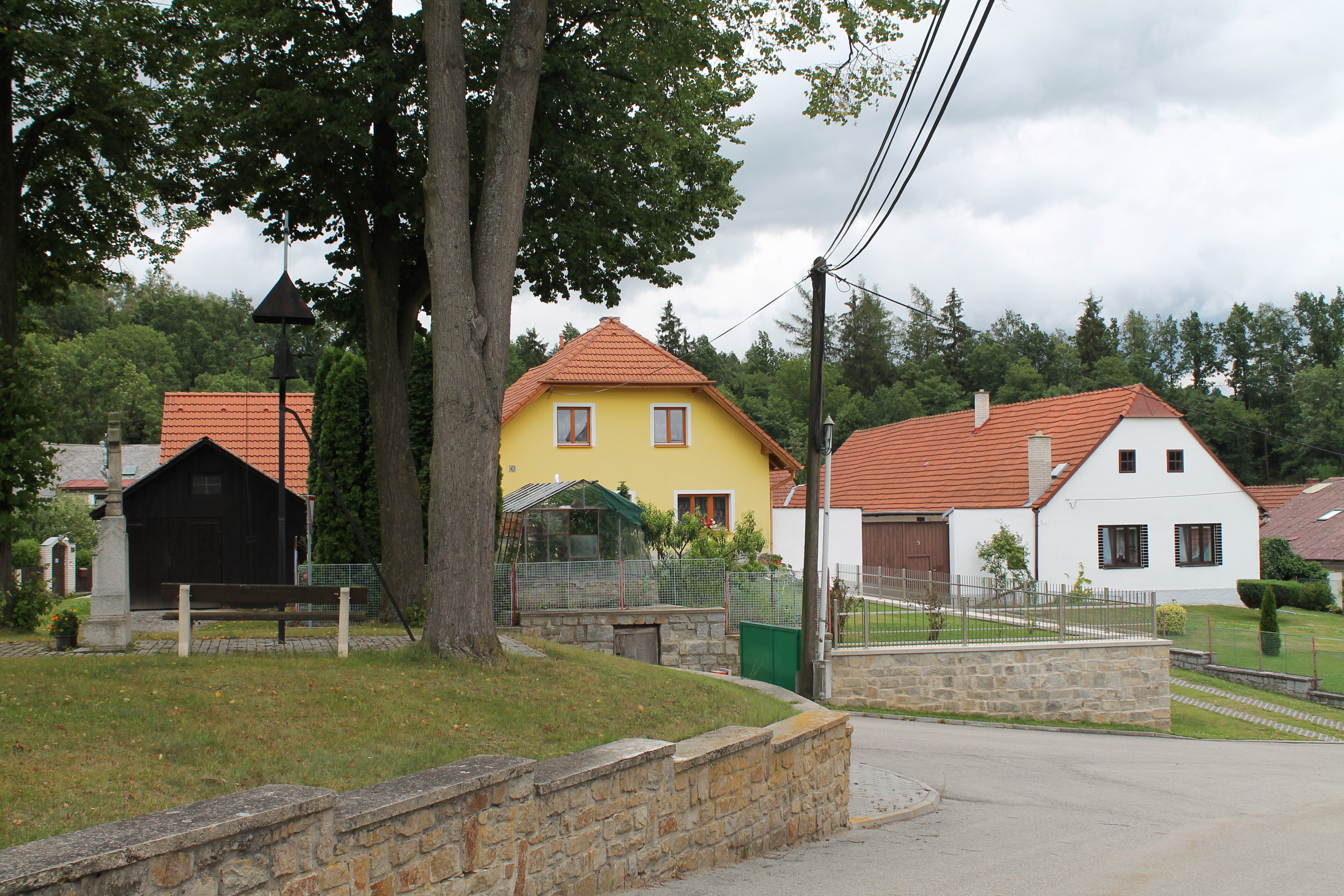
- Centre of Žatec

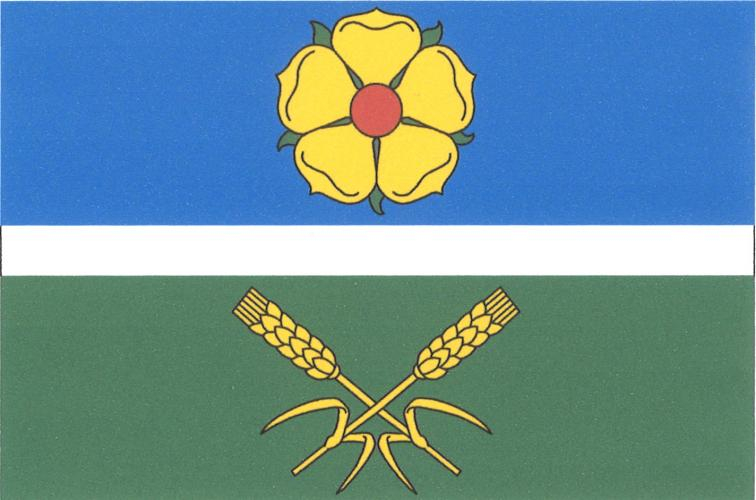
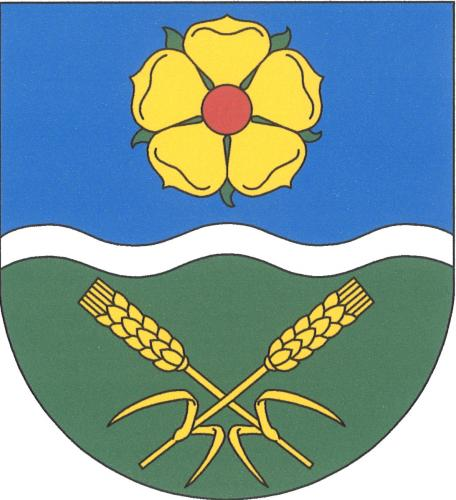
- Flag Coat of arms

- Location in the Czech Republic
- Coordinates: 49°12′23″N 15°30′32″E
- Country: Czech Republic
- Region: Vysočina
- District: Jihlava
- First mentioned: 1371

Area
  - Total: 3.14 km^{2} (1.21 sq mi)
- Elevation: 534 m (1,752 ft)

Population (2026-01-01)
  - Total: 113
  - Density: 36.0/km^{2} (93.2/sq mi)
- Time zone: UTC+1 (CET)
  - Summer (DST): UTC+2 (CEST)
- Postal code: 588 62

Žatec is a municipality and village in Jihlava District in the Vysočina Region of the Czech Republic. It has about 100 inhabitants.

Žatec lies approximately 23 kilometres (14 mi) south of Jihlava and 126 km (78 mi) south-east of Prague.

== Demographics ==
Historical population
Year	Pop.	±%
1869	156	—
1880	165	+5.8%
1890	194	+17.6%
1900	179	−7.7%
1910	150	−16.2%
1921	170	+13.3%
1930	156	−8.2%
1950	135	−13.5%
1961	171	+26.7%
1970	155	−9.4%
1980	144	−7.1%
1991	127	−11.8%
2001	112	−11.8%
2011	122	+8.9%
2021	110	−9.8%
Source: Censuses
