= Urbanov =

- Municipality
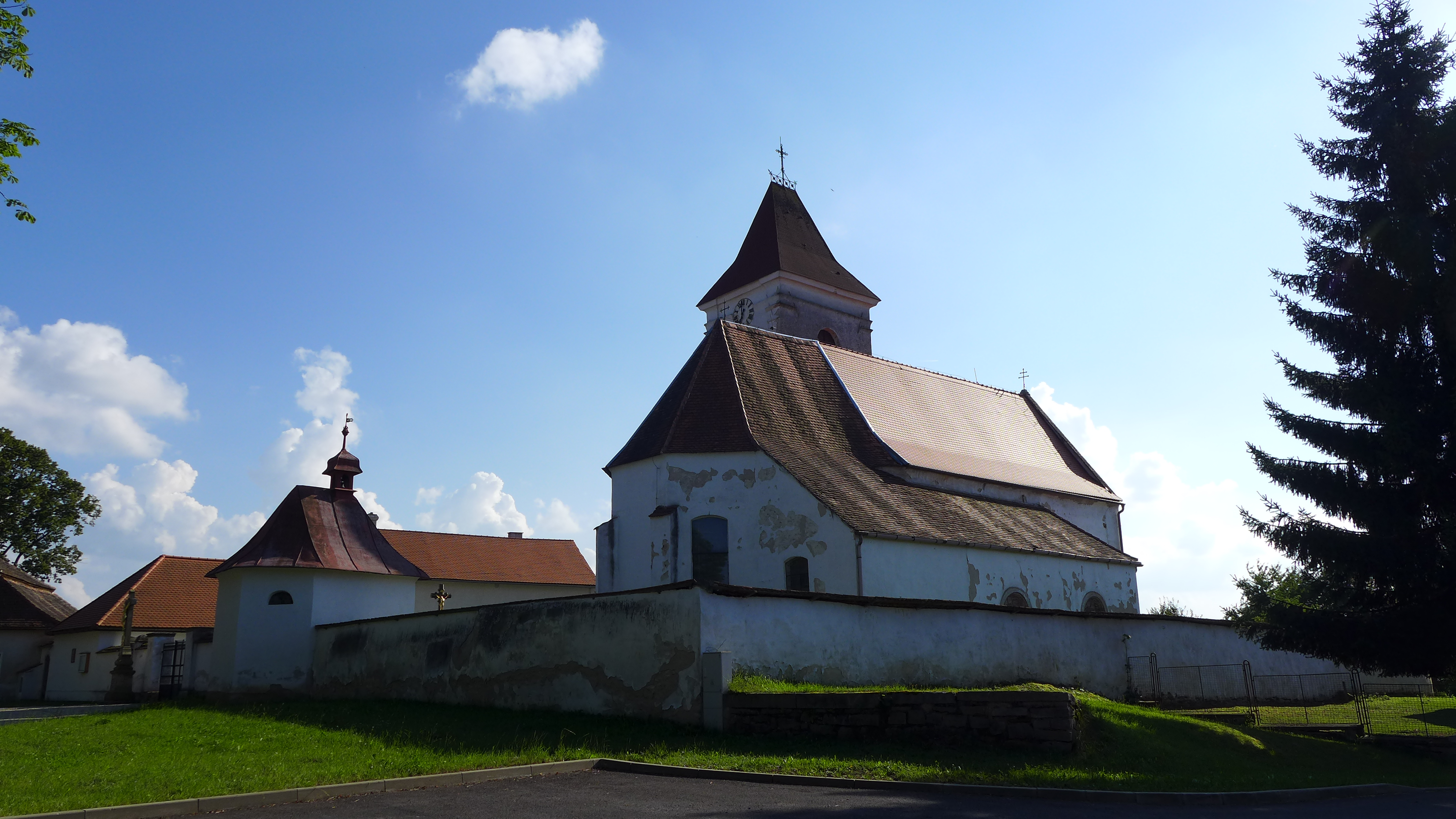
- Church of Saint John the Baptist

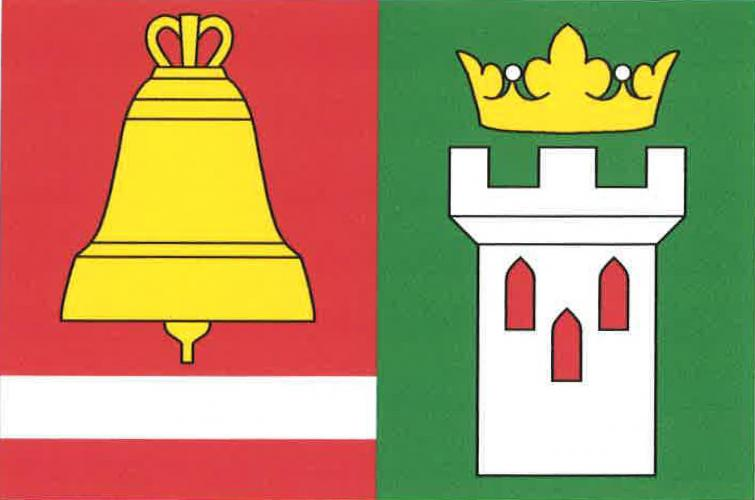
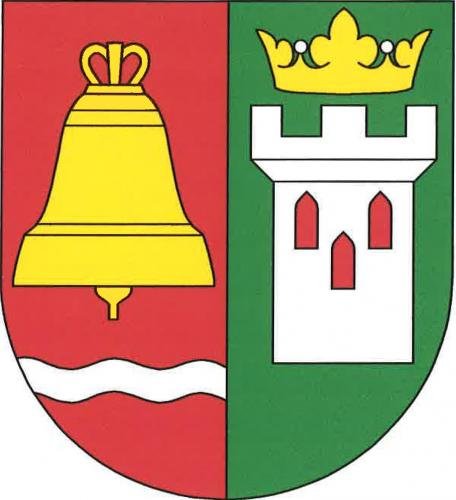
- Flag Coat of arms

- Location in the Czech Republic
- Coordinates: 49°12′52″N 15°30′51″E
- Country: Czech Republic
- Region: Vysočina
- District: Jihlava
- First mentioned: 1355

Area
  - Total: 3.37 km^{2} (1.30 sq mi)
- Elevation: 548 m (1,798 ft)

Population (2026-01-01)
  - Total: 120
  - Density: 36/km^{2} (92/sq mi)
- Time zone: UTC+1 (CET)
  - Summer (DST): UTC+2 (CEST)
- Postal code: 588 62
- Website: www.obecurbanov.cz

Urbanov (Czech pronunciation: [ˈurbanof]) is a municipality and village in Jihlava District in the Vysočina Region of the Czech Republic. It has about 100 inhabitants.

Urbanov lies approximately 21 kilometres (13 mi) south of Jihlava and 126 km (78 mi) south-east of Prague.

== Demographics ==
Historical population
Year	Pop.	±%
1869	215	—
1880	237	+10.2%
1890	244	+3.0%
1900	239	−2.0%
1910	203	−15.1%
1921	206	+1.5%
1930	204	−1.0%
1950	164	−19.6%
1961	179	+9.1%
1970	168	−6.1%
1980	133	−20.8%
1991	130	−2.3%
2001	123	−5.4%
2011	131	+6.5%
2021	121	−7.6%
Source: Censuses
