= Horní Štěpánov =

- Municipality
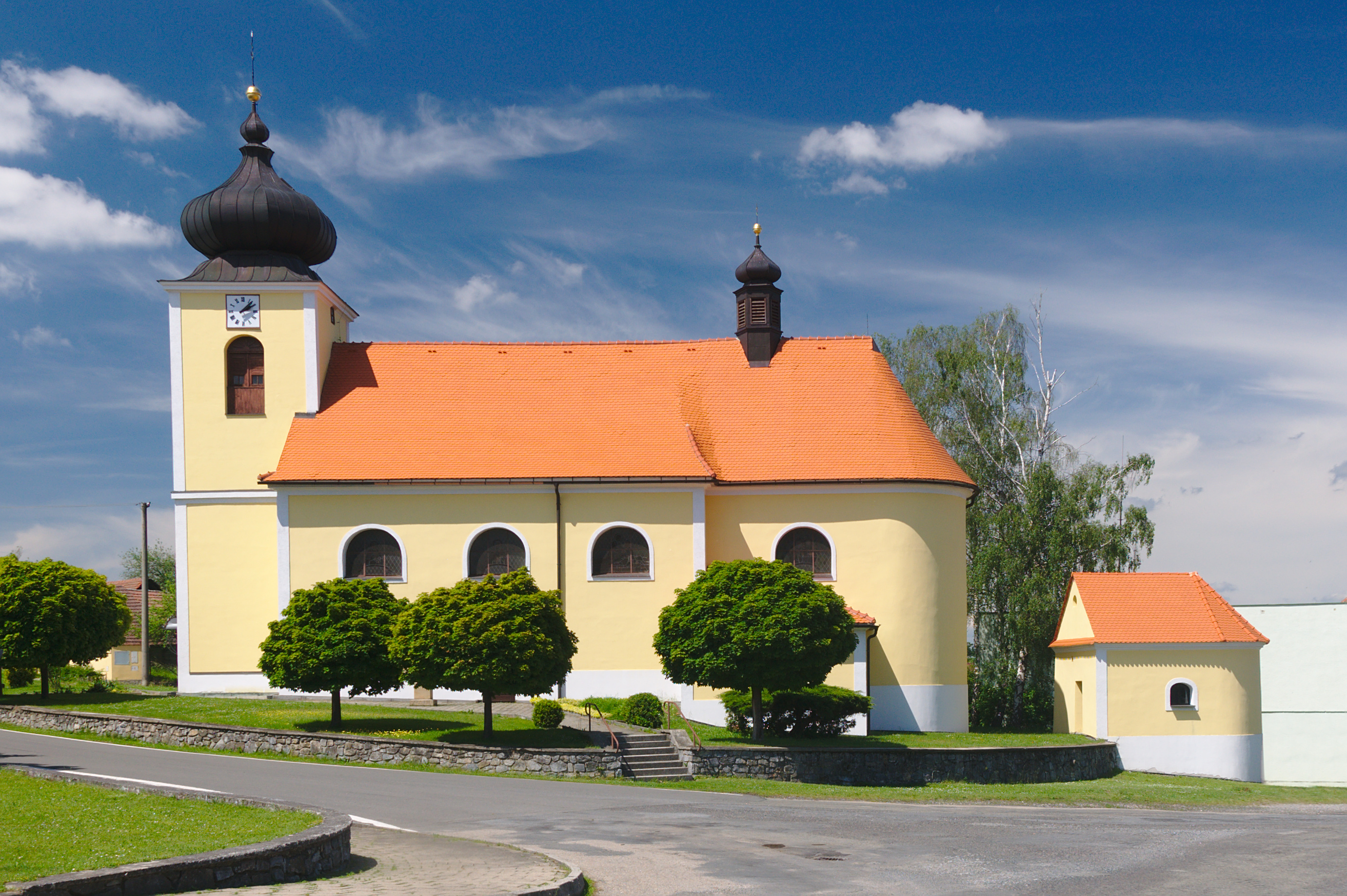
- Church of Saint Lawrence

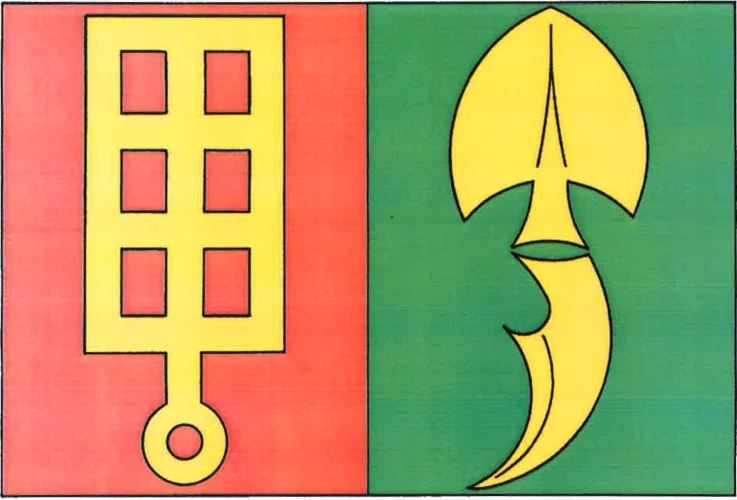
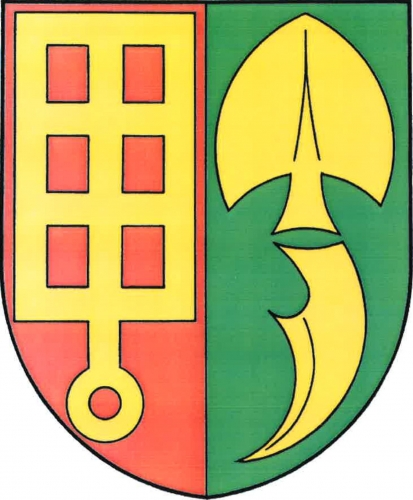
- Flag Coat of arms

- Location in the Czech Republic
- Coordinates: 49°32′57″N 16°47′27″E
- Country: Czech Republic
- Region: Olomouc
- District: Prostějov
- First mentioned: 1275

Area
  - Total: 20.00 km^{2} (7.72 sq mi)
- Elevation: 605 m (1,985 ft)

Population (2026-01-01)
  - Total: 869
  - Density: 43.4/km^{2} (113/sq mi)
- Time zone: UTC+1 (CET)
  - Summer (DST): UTC+2 (CEST)
- Postal code: 798 47
- Website: www.hornistepanov.cz

Horní Štěpánov (German: Stefansdorf) is a municipality and village in Prostějov District in the Olomouc Region of the Czech Republic. It has about 900 inhabitants.

Horní Štěpánov lies approximately 25 kilometres (16 mi) west of Prostějov, 34 km (21 mi) west of Olomouc, and 181 km (112 mi) east of Prague.

== Administrative division ==
Horní Štěpánov consists of three municipal parts (in brackets population according to the 2021 census):

- Horní Štěpánov (667)
- Nové Sady (88)
- Pohora (87)

== Demographics ==
Historical population
Year	Pop.	±%
1869	2,024	—
1880	2,131	+5.3%
1890	2,221	+4.2%
1900	2,302	+3.6%
1910	2,188	−5.0%
1921	2,033	−7.1%
1930	1,875	−7.8%
1950	1,434	−23.5%
1961	1,532	+6.8%
1970	1,369	−10.6%
1980	1,247	−8.9%
1991	1,085	−13.0%
2001	1,036	−4.5%
2011	932	−10.0%
2021	842	−9.7%
Source: Censuses
