= Dyjice =

- Municipality
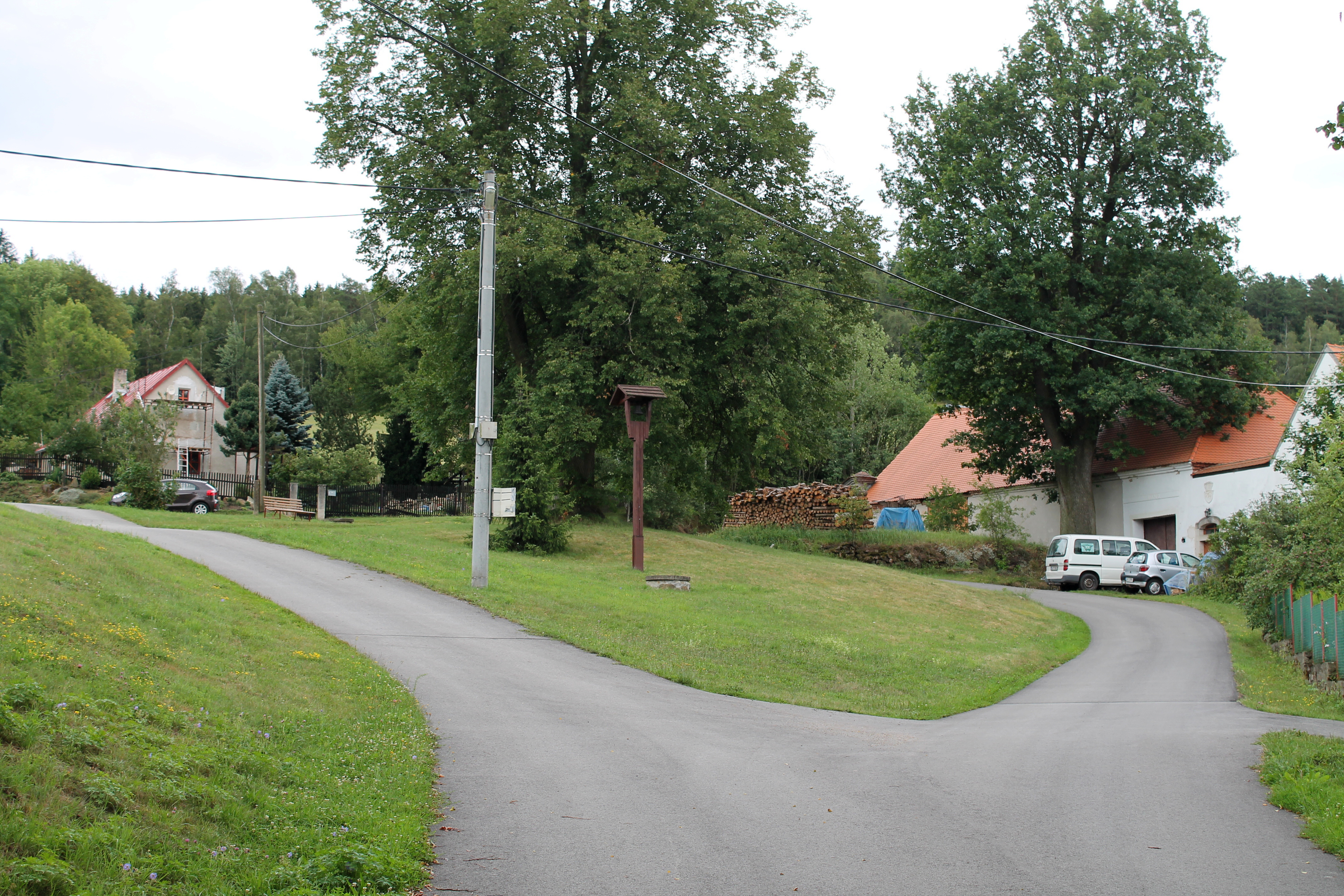
- Dyjička, a part of Dyjice

- Location in the Czech Republic
- Coordinates: 49°10′29″N 15°29′38″E
- Country: Czech Republic
- Region: Vysočina
- District: Jihlava
- First mentioned: 1361

Area
  - Total: 14.93 km^{2} (5.76 sq mi)
- Elevation: 536 m (1,759 ft)

Population (2026-01-01)
  - Total: 138
  - Density: 9.24/km^{2} (23.9/sq mi)
- Time zone: UTC+1 (CET)
  - Summer (DST): UTC+2 (CEST)
- Postal codes: 588 56, 588 62
- Website: www.dyjice.cz

Dyjice (Czech pronunciation: [ˈdɪjɪtsɛ]) is a municipality and village in Jihlava District in the Vysočina Region of the Czech Republic. It has about 100 inhabitants.

Dyjice lies approximately 26 kilometres (16 mi) south of Jihlava and 128 km (80 mi) south-east of Prague.

== Administrative division ==
Dyjice consists of four municipal parts (in brackets population according to the 2021 census):

- Dyjice (52)
- Dolní Dvorce (28)
- Dyjička (39)
- Stranná (12)

== Demographics ==
Historical population
Year	Pop.	±%
1869	264	—
1880	299	+13.3%
1890	321	+7.4%
1900	299	−6.9%
1910	290	−3.0%
1921	295	+1.7%
1930	274	−7.1%
1950	196	−28.5%
1961	184	−6.1%
1970	206	+12.0%
1980	166	−19.4%
1991	134	−19.3%
2001	136	+1.5%
2011	133	−2.2%
2021	131	−1.5%
Source: Censuses
