= Černíč =

- Municipality
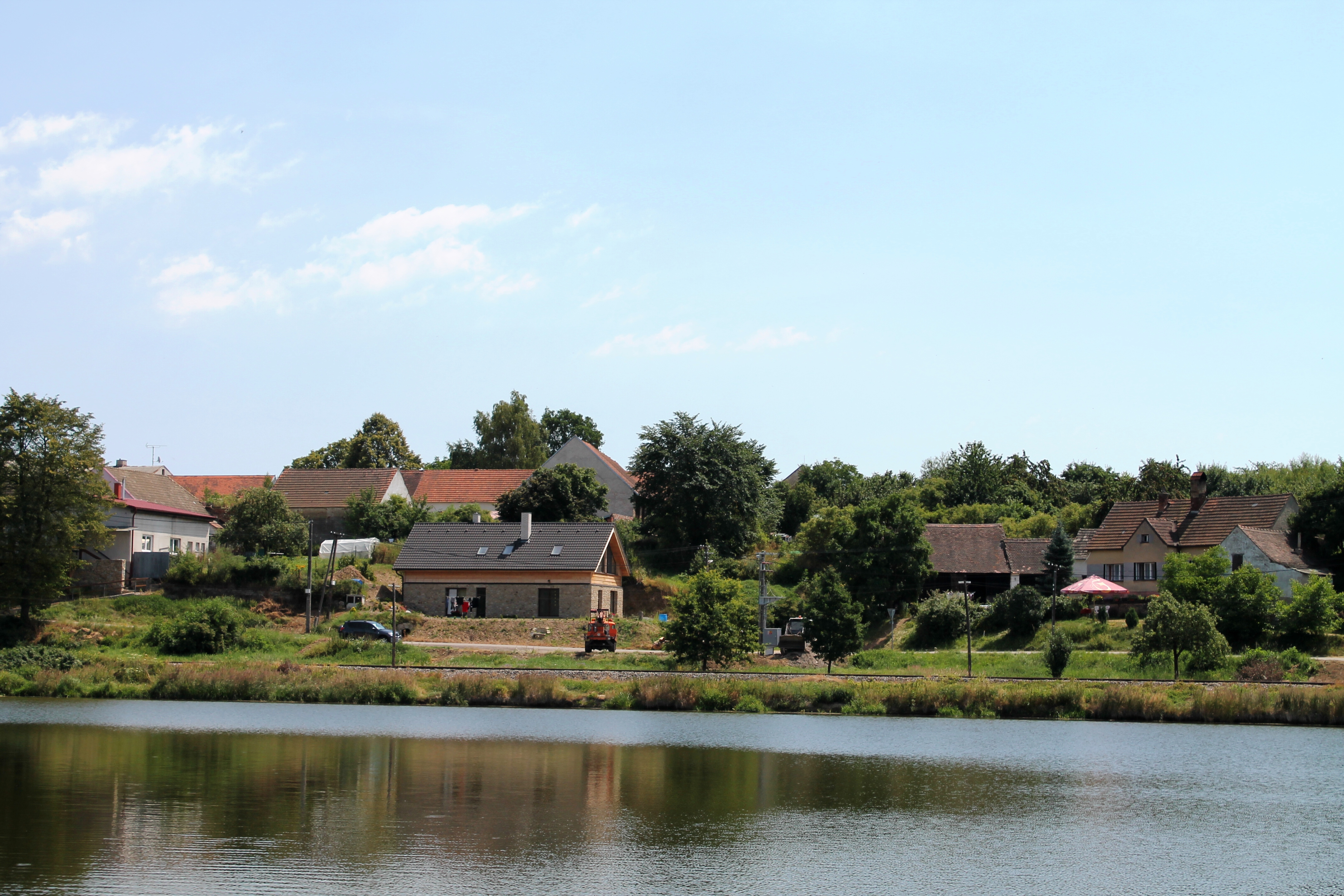
- View over the Černíčský Pond

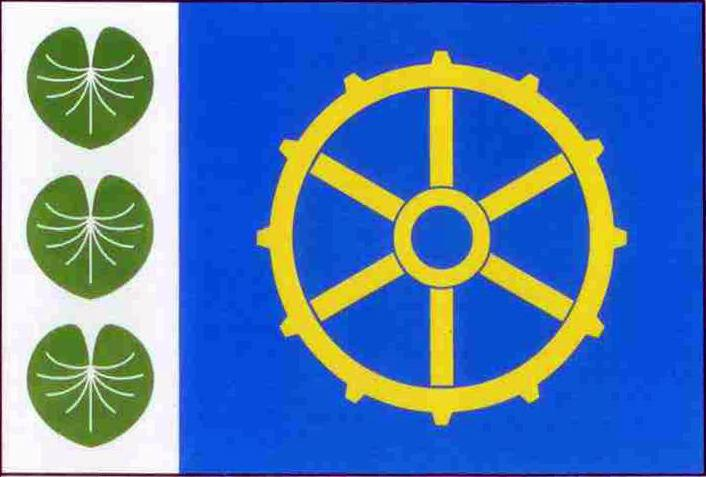
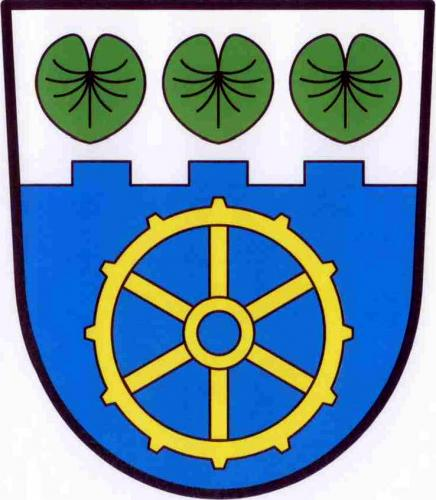
- Flag Coat of arms

- Location in the Czech Republic
- Coordinates: 49°7′41″N 15°27′34″E
- Country: Czech Republic
- Region: Vysočina
- District: Jihlava
- First mentioned: 1350

Area
  - Total: 7.63 km^{2} (2.95 sq mi)
- Elevation: 485 m (1,591 ft)

Population (2026-01-01)
  - Total: 121
  - Density: 15.9/km^{2} (41.1/sq mi)
- Time zone: UTC+1 (CET)
  - Summer (DST): UTC+2 (CEST)
- Postal code: 588 56
- Website: www.cernic.cz

Černíč (Czech pronunciation: [ˈtʃɛrɲiːtʃ]) is a municipality and village in Jihlava District in the Vysočina Region of the Czech Republic. It has about 100 inhabitants.

Černíč lies approximately 32 kilometres (20 mi) south of Jihlava and 131 km (81 mi) south-east of Prague.

== Administrative division ==
Černíč consists of three municipal parts (in brackets population according to the 2021 census):

- Černíč (61)
- Myslůvka (30)
- Slaviboř (20)

== Demographics ==
Historical population
Year	Pop.	±%
1869	304	—
1880	306	+0.7%
1890	307	+0.3%
1900	263	−14.3%
1910	248	−5.7%
1921	252	+1.6%
1930	248	−1.6%
1950	195	−21.4%
1961	195	+0.0%
1970	185	−5.1%
1980	185	+0.0%
1991	158	−14.6%
2001	150	−5.1%
2011	134	−10.7%
2021	111	−17.2%
Source: Censuses
