= Leštinka (Chrudim District) =

Municipality in the Czech Republic

- Municipality
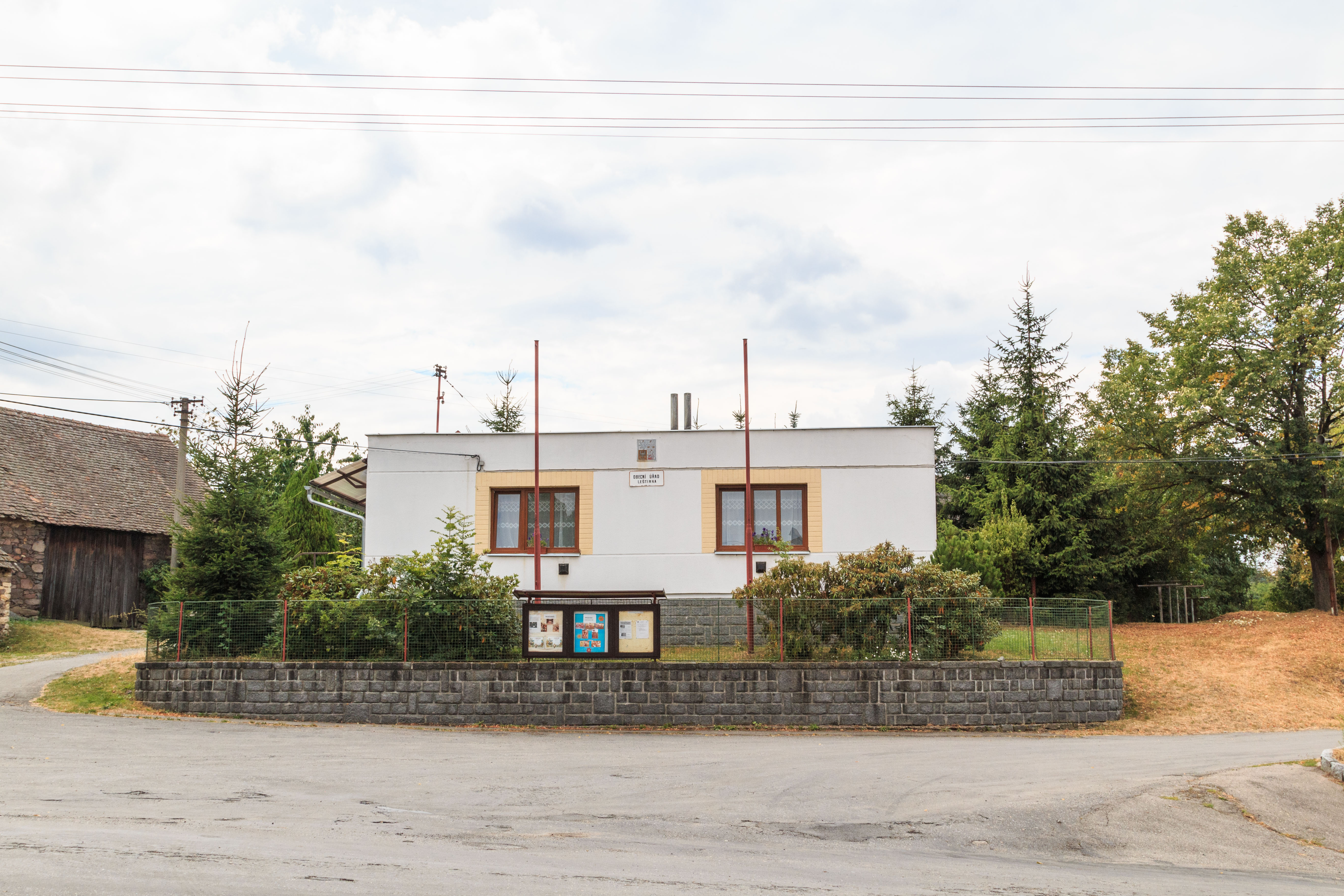
- Municipal office

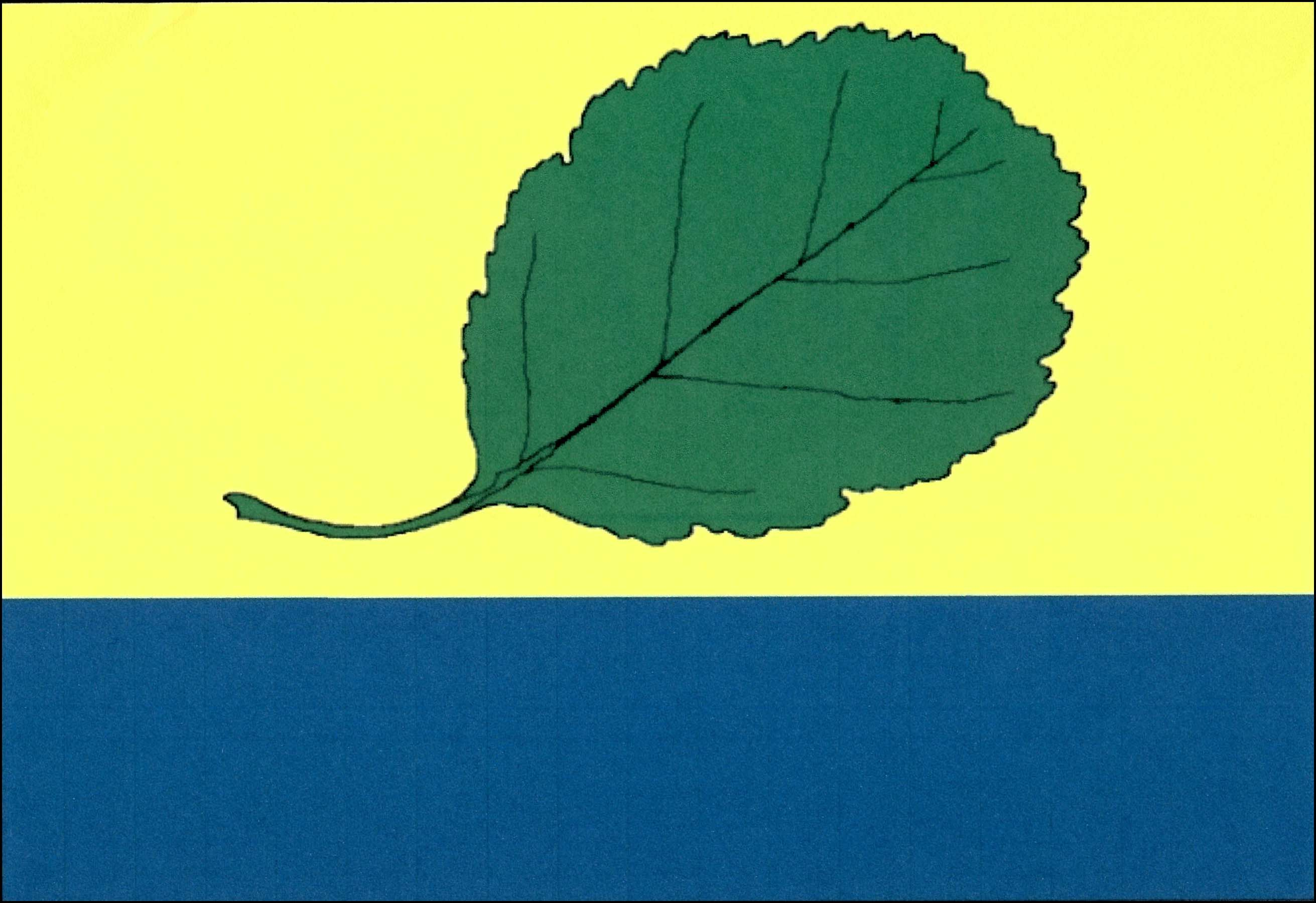
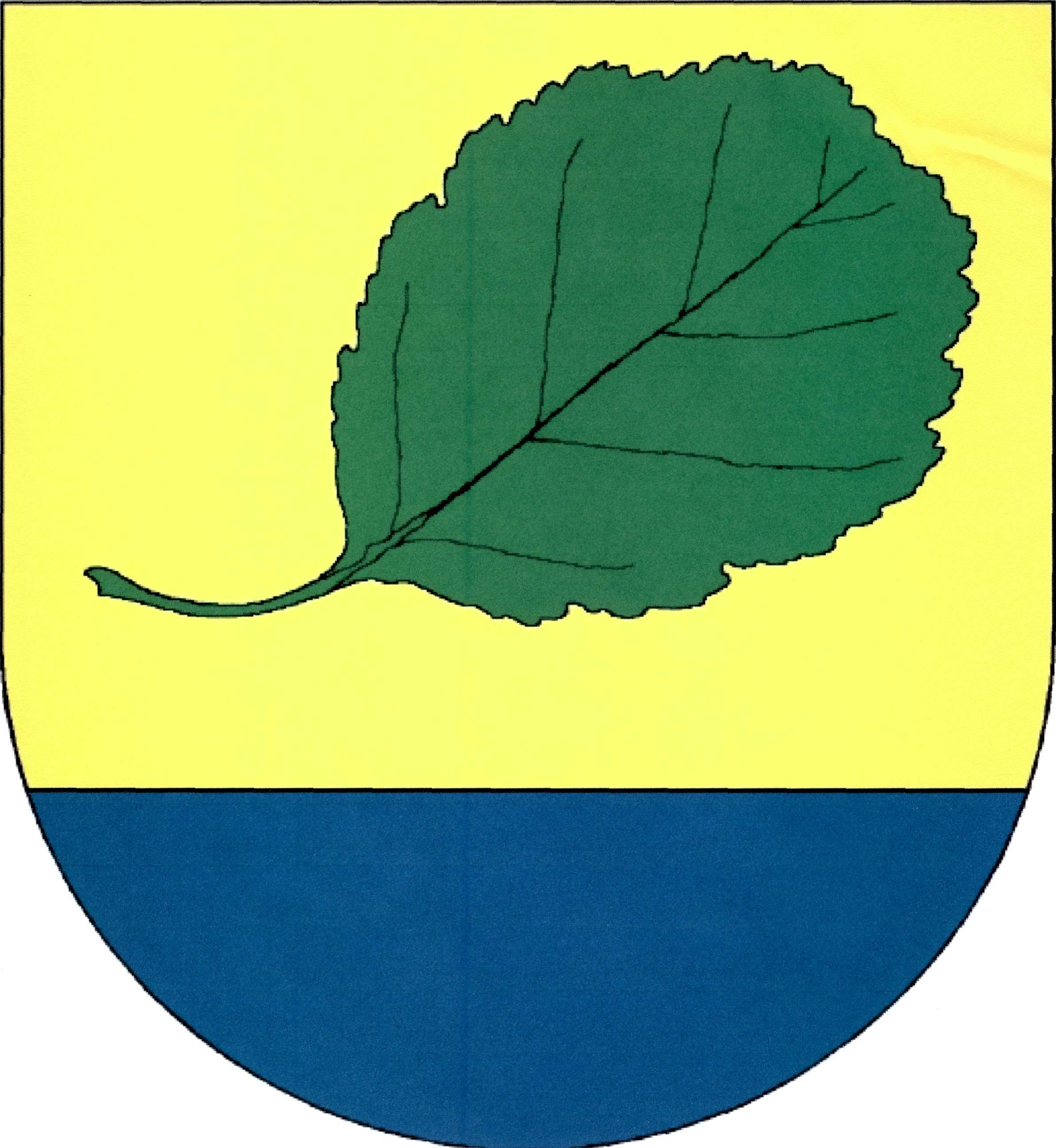
- Flag Coat of arms

- Location in the Czech Republic
- Coordinates: 49°50′43″N 15°57′32″E
- Country: Czech Republic
- Region: Pardubice
- District: Chrudim
- First mentioned: 1392

Area
  - Total: 1.60 km^{2} (0.62 sq mi)
- Elevation: 384 m (1,260 ft)

Population (2026-01-01)
  - Total: 179
  - Density: 112/km^{2} (290/sq mi)
- Time zone: UTC+1 (CET)
  - Summer (DST): UTC+2 (CEST)
- Postal code: 539 73
- Website: www.obeclestinka.cz

Leštinka is a municipality and village in Chrudim District in the Pardubice Region of the Czech Republic. It has about 200 inhabitants.

== Demographics ==
Historical population
Year	Pop.	±%
1869	249	—
1880	231	−7.2%
1890	222	−3.9%
1900	257	+15.8%
1910	302	+17.5%
1921	285	−5.6%
1930	299	+4.9%
1950	188	−37.1%
1961	200	+6.4%
1970	178	−11.0%
1980	142	−20.2%
1991	133	−6.3%
2001	146	+9.8%
2011	135	−7.5%
2021	150	+11.1%
Source: Censuses

== Notable people ==
- Jindřich Nermuť (1917–1990), politician
