= Radkov (Jihlava District) =

- Municipality
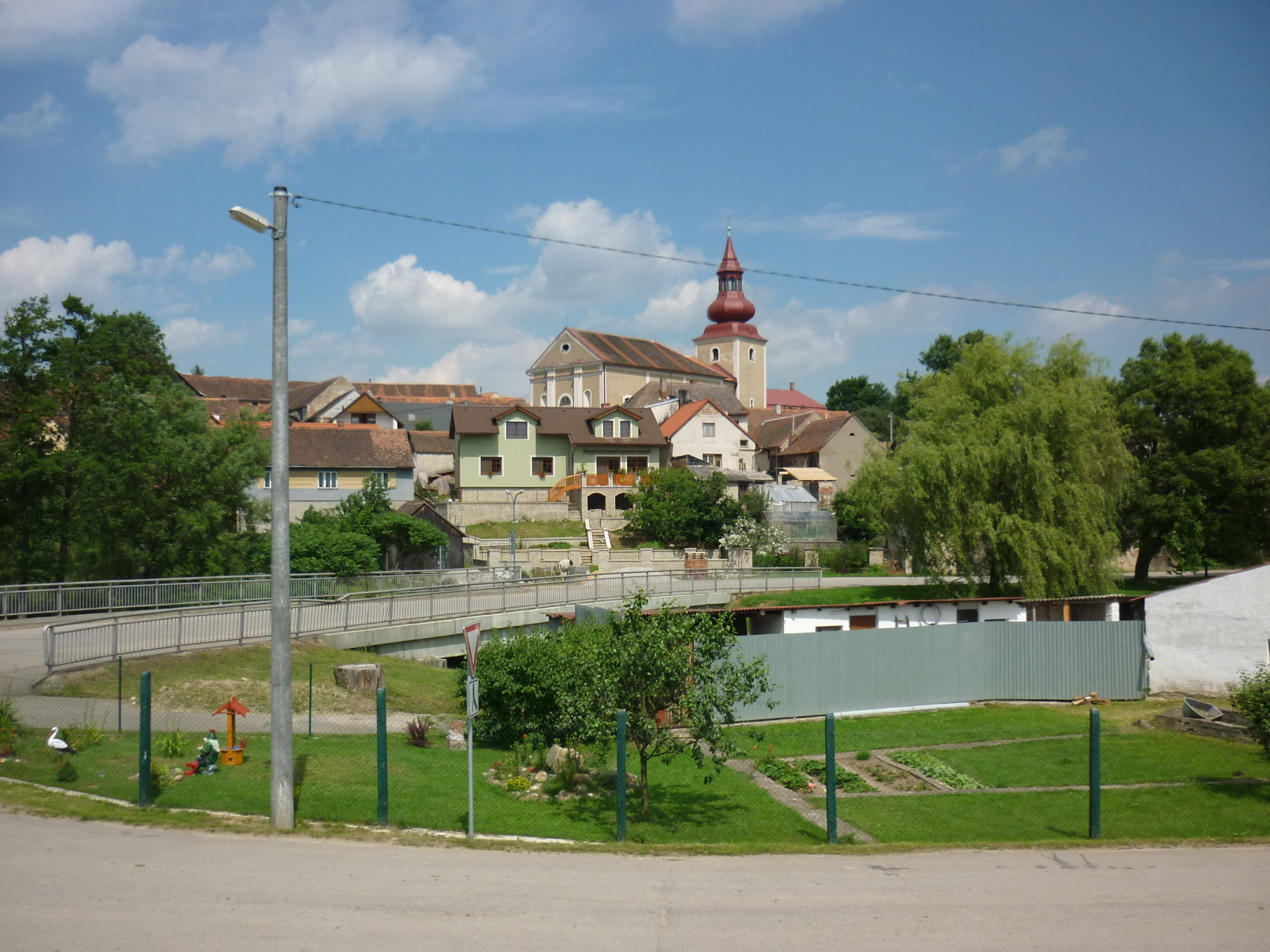
- View towards the Church of Saint Bartholomew

- Location in the Czech Republic
- Coordinates: 49°8′43″N 15°28′31″E
- Country: Czech Republic
- Region: Vysočina
- District: Jihlava
- First mentioned: 1358

Area
  - Total: 6.28 km^{2} (2.42 sq mi)
- Elevation: 488 m (1,601 ft)

Population (2026-01-01)
  - Total: 217
  - Density: 34.6/km^{2} (89.5/sq mi)
- Time zone: UTC+1 (CET)
  - Summer (DST): UTC+2 (CEST)
- Postal code: 588 56
- Website: www.radkov.cz

Radkov (Czech pronunciation: [ˈratkof]) is a municipality and village in Jihlava District in the Vysočina Region of the Czech Republic. It has about 200 inhabitants.

Radkov lies approximately 29 kilometres (18 mi) south of Jihlava and 130 km (81 mi) south-east of Prague.

== Demographics ==
Historical population
| Year | Pop. | ±% |
|---|---|---|
| 1869 | 237 | — |
| 1880 | 297 | +25.3% |
| 1890 | 295 | −0.7% |
| 1900 | 286 | −3.1% |
| 1910 | 280 | −2.1% |
| 1921 | 284 | +1.4% |
| 1930 | 248 | −12.7% |
| 1950 | 233 | −6.0% |
| 1961 | 274 | +17.6% |
| 1970 | 271 | −1.1% |
| 1980 | 240 | −11.4% |
| 1991 | 206 | −14.2% |
| 2001 | 229 | +11.2% |
| 2011 | 227 | −0.9% |
| 2021 | 224 | −1.3% |
Source: Censuses
