= Bezděkov (Havlíčkův Brod District) =

- Municipality
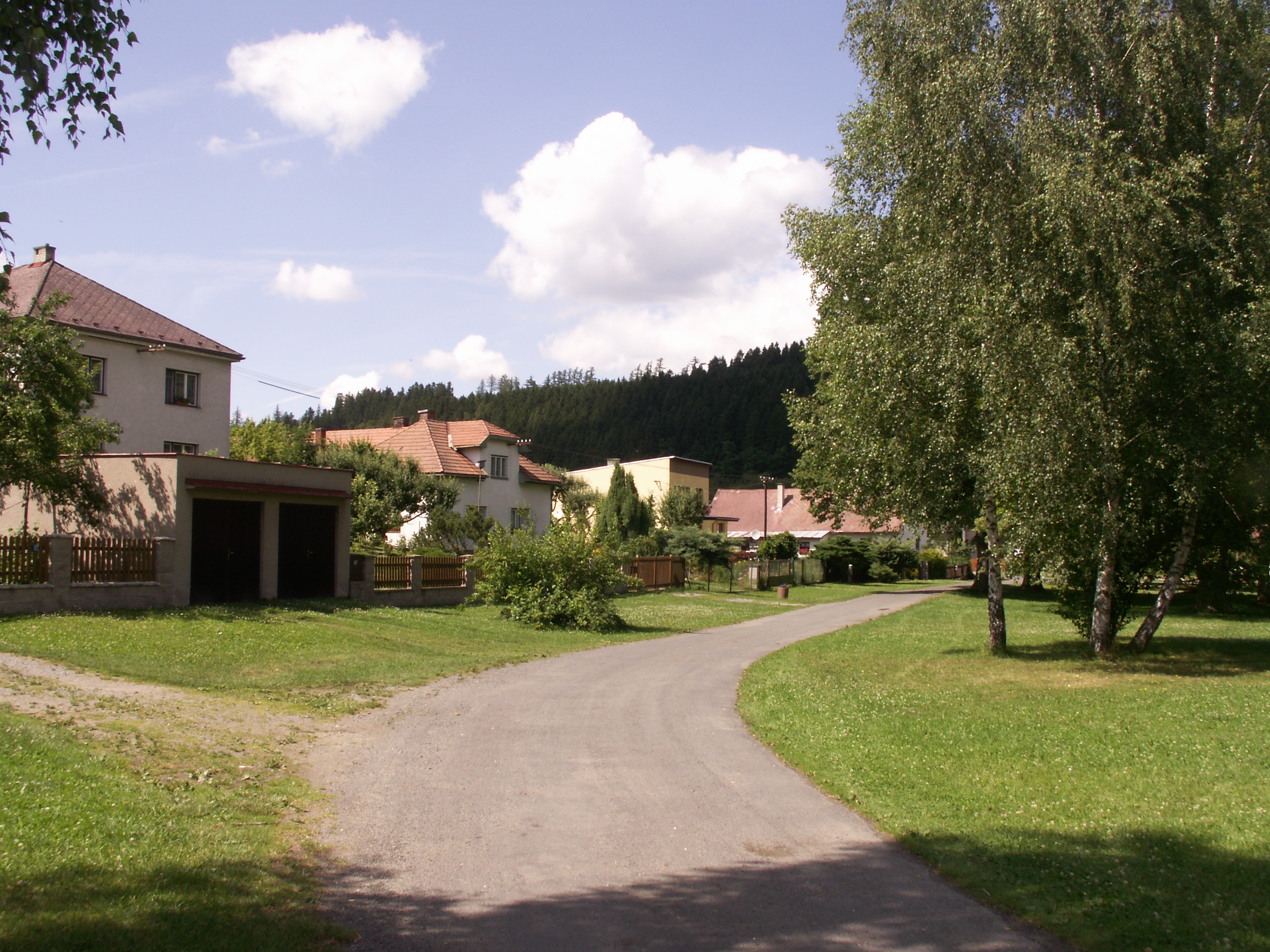
- Centre of Bezděkov

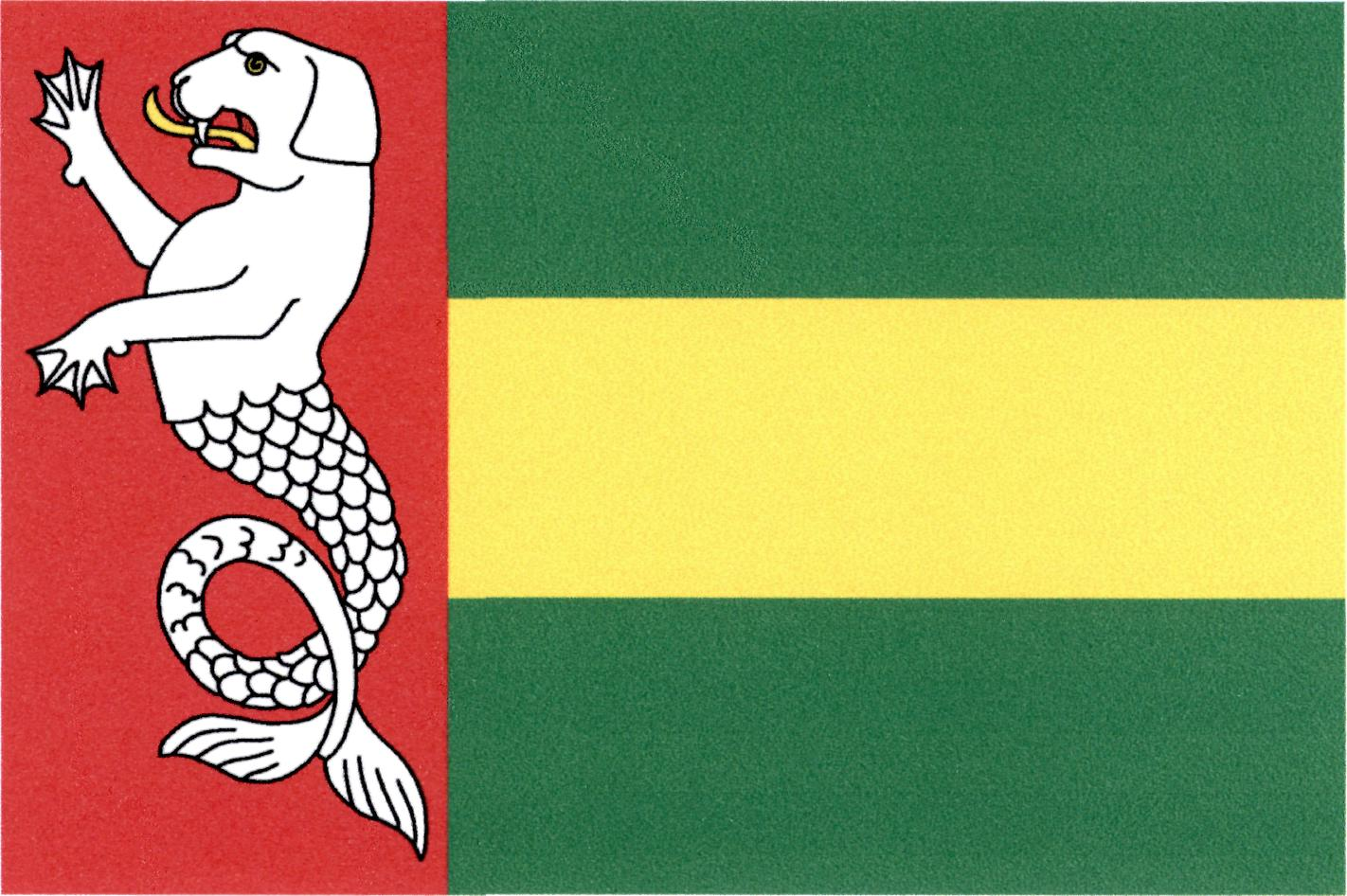
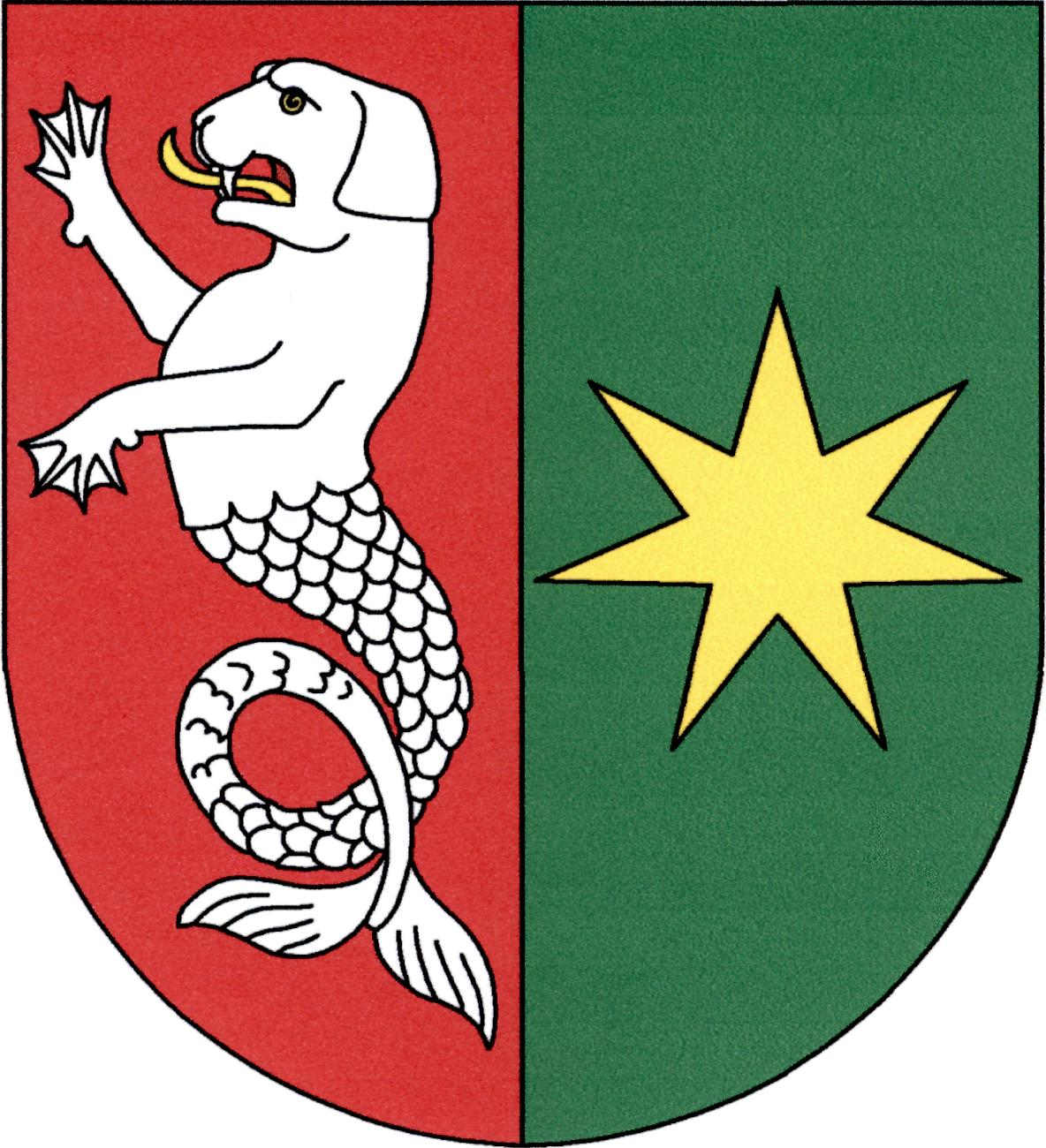
- Flag Coat of arms

- Location in the Czech Republic
- Coordinates: 49°43′58″N 15°43′50″E
- Country: Czech Republic
- Region: Vysočina
- District: Havlíčkův Brod
- First mentioned: 1544

Area
  - Total: 5.36 km^{2} (2.07 sq mi)
- Elevation: 433 m (1,421 ft)

Population (2026-01-01)
  - Total: 238
  - Density: 44.4/km^{2} (115/sq mi)
- Time zone: UTC+1 (CET)
  - Summer (DST): UTC+2 (CEST)
- Postal code: 583 01
- Website: bezdekovobec.cz

Bezděkov (Czech pronunciation: [ˈbɛzɟɛkof]) is a municipality and village in Havlíčkův Brod District in the Vysočina Region of the Czech Republic. It has about 200 inhabitants.

Bezděkov lies approximately 18 kilometres (11 mi) north-east of Havlíčkův Brod, 39 km (24 mi) north of Jihlava, and 102 km (63 mi) south-east of Prague.

== Administrative division ==
Bezděkov consists of three municipal parts (in brackets population according to the 2021 census):

- Bezděkov (212)
- Hařilova Lhotka (7)
- Štěpánov (6)

== Etymology ==
The name is derived from the personal name Bezděk, meaning "Bezděk's (court)".

== Demographics ==
Historical population
Year	Pop.	±%
1869	435	—
1880	408	−6.2%
1890	416	+2.0%
1900	411	−1.2%
1910	432	+5.1%
1921	432	+0.0%
1930	360	−16.7%
1950	293	−18.6%
1961	315	+7.5%
1970	290	−7.9%
1980	264	−9.0%
1991	256	−3.0%
2001	235	−8.2%
2011	241	+2.6%
2021	225	−6.6%
Source: Censuses
