= Písečné (Jindřichův Hradec District) =

- Municipality
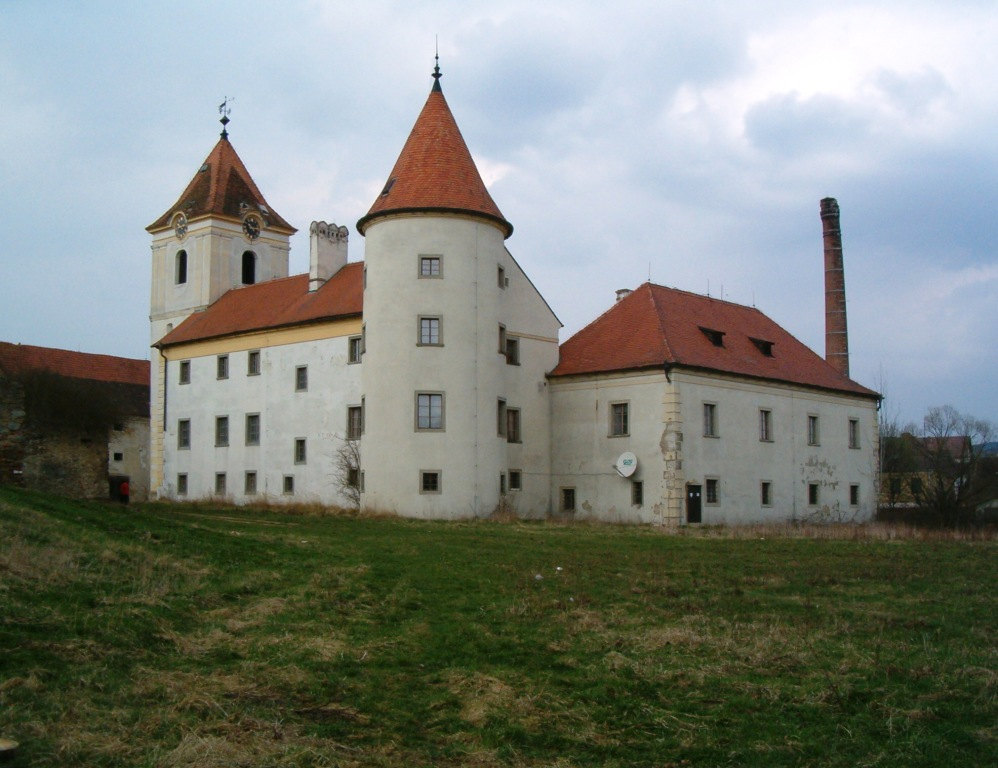
- Písečné Castle

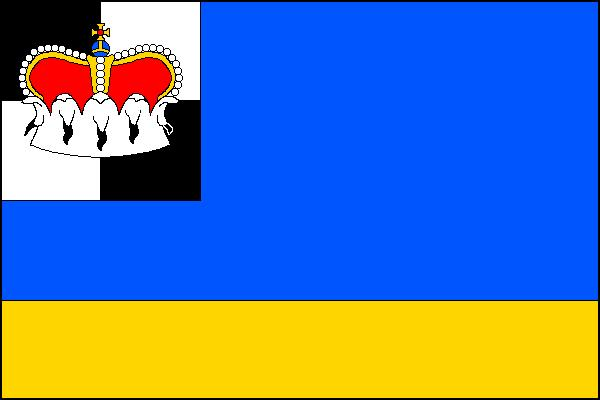
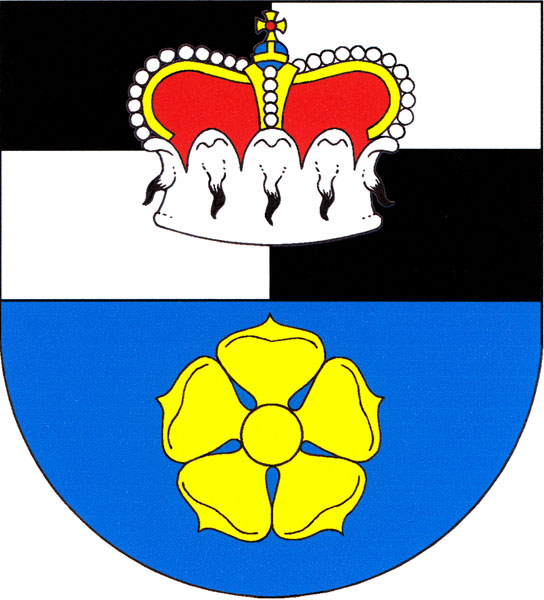
- Flag Coat of arms

- Location in the Czech Republic
- Coordinates: 48°57′54″N 15°27′45″E
- Country: Czech Republic
- Region: South Bohemian
- District: Jindřichův Hradec
- First mentioned: 1366

Area
  - Total: 33.46 km^{2} (12.92 sq mi)
- Elevation: 443 m (1,453 ft)

Population (2026-01-01)
  - Total: 484
  - Density: 14.5/km^{2} (37.5/sq mi)
- Time zone: UTC+1 (CET)
  - Summer (DST): UTC+2 (CEST)
- Postal codes: 378 72, 378 81
- Website: www.pisecne.cz

Písečné (German: Piesling) is a municipality and village in Jindřichův Hradec District in the South Bohemian Region of the Czech Republic. It has about 500 inhabitants.

Písečné lies approximately 39 kilometres (24 mi) south-east of Jindřichův Hradec, 71 km (44 mi) east of České Budějovice, and 146 km (91 mi) south-east of Prague.

== Administrative division ==
Písečné consists of seven municipal parts (in brackets population according to the 2021 census):

- Písečné (288)
- Chvaletín (40)
- Marketa (27)
- Modletice (11)
- Nové Sady (24)
- Slavětín (56)
- Václavov (3)

== Demographics ==
Historical population
Year	Pop.	±%
1869	1,865	—
1880	1,860	−0.3%
1890	1,887	+1.5%
1900	1,873	−0.7%
1910	1,859	−0.7%
1921	1,830	−1.6%
1930	1,646	−10.1%
1950	1,134	−31.1%
1961	1,066	−6.0%
1970	892	−16.3%
1980	682	−23.5%
1991	592	−13.2%
2001	558	−5.7%
2011	533	−4.5%
2021	449	−15.8%
Source: Censuses
