= Leština u Světlé =

- Municipality
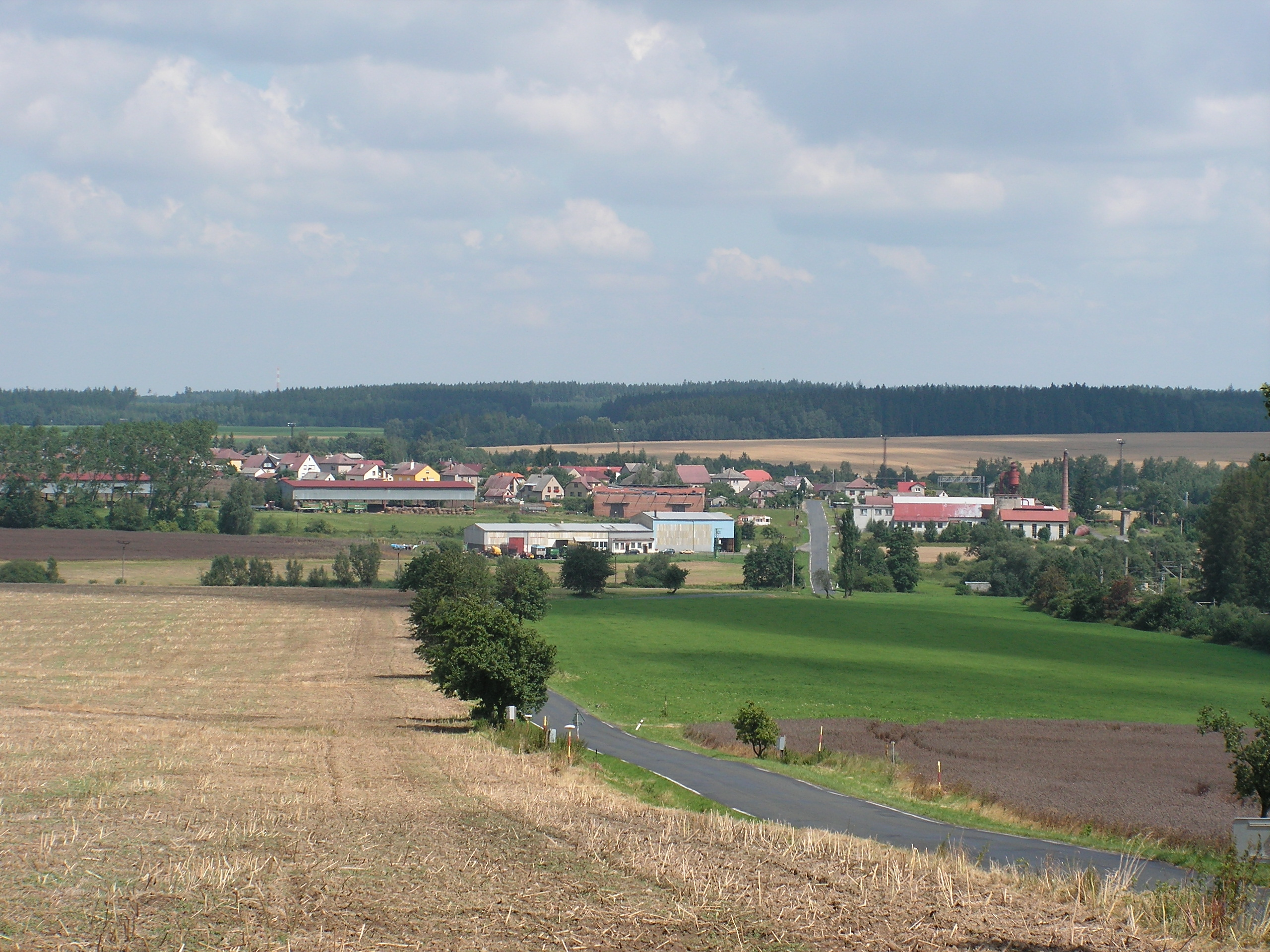
- General view

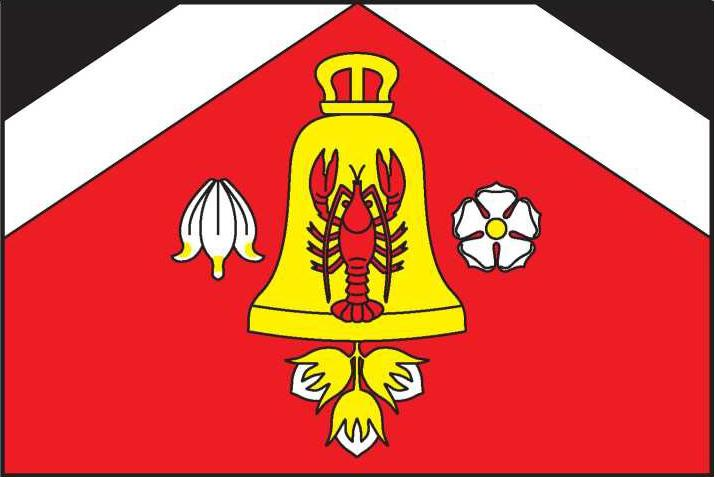
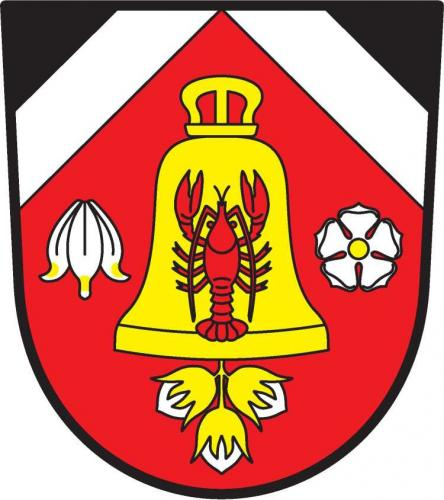
- Flag Coat of arms

- Location in the Czech Republic
- Coordinates: 49°45′41″N 15°23′52″E
- Country: Czech Republic
- Region: Vysočina
- District: Havlíčkův Brod
- First mentioned: 1327

Area
  - Total: 18.19 km^{2} (7.02 sq mi)
- Elevation: 455 m (1,493 ft)

Population (2026-01-01)
  - Total: 528
  - Density: 29.0/km^{2} (75.2/sq mi)
- Time zone: UTC+1 (CET)
  - Summer (DST): UTC+2 (CEST)
- Postal codes: 582 82, 582 86, 584 01
- Website: www.lestinausvetle.cz

Leština u Světlé is a municipality and village in Havlíčkův Brod District in the Vysočina Region of the Czech Republic. It has about 500 inhabitants.

Leština u Světlé lies approximately 23 kilometres (14 mi) north-west of Havlíčkův Brod, 44 km (27 mi) north of Jihlava, and 79 km (49 mi) south-east of Prague.

== Administrative division ==
Leština u Světlé consists of four municipal parts (in brackets population according to the 2021 census):

- Leština u Světlé (368)
- Dobrnice (64)
- Štěpánov (40)
- Vrbice (41)

== Demographics ==
Historical population
Year	Pop.	±%
1869	1,158	—
1880	1,120	−3.3%
1890	1,094	−2.3%
1900	1,098	+0.4%
1910	962	−12.4%
1921	961	−0.1%
1930	1,002	+4.3%
1950	800	−20.2%
1961	813	+1.6%
1970	756	−7.0%
1980	694	−8.2%
1991	635	−8.5%
2001	636	+0.2%
2011	577	−9.3%
2021	513	−11.1%
Source: Censuses
