= Morava =

Morava may refer to:

== Rivers ==
- Great Morava (Velika Morava; or simply Morava), a river in Serbia, and its tributaries:
  - South Morava (Južna Morava)
    - Binač Morava (Binačka Morava)
  - West Morava (Zapadna Morava)
- Morava (river), a river in the Czech Republic, Austria and Slovakia

== Places ==
- Morava (city), an early medieval fortress on the site of ancient Margum, near modern-day Požarevac, Serbia
- Morava (Svishtov), a village in the Svishtov Municipality, Bulgaria
- Morava (Kočevje), a village in the municipality of Kočevje, Slovenia
- Morava (Serbian Cyrillic: Морава), the old name for Gnjilane (Albanian: Gjilan)
- Suva Morava ("Dry Morava"), a village in the municipality of Vladičin Han, Serbia
- Dolní Morava ("Lower Morava"), a municipality and village in the Ústí nad Orlicí District, Czech Republic
- Malá Morava ("Little Morava"), a municipality and village in the Šumperk District, Czech Republic
- Morava Mountains, a mountain range in southeast Albania, near Korçë
- Morava Banovina, a province of the Kingdom of Yugoslavia between 1929 and 1941
- Donja Morava ("Lower Morava"), a region in Kosovo
- Gornja Morava ("Upper Morava"), a region in Kosovo
- Morava Valley, a geographical area in Serbia around the Great Morava (or simply Morava) and its tributaries
- Upper Morava Valley, a lowland and a geomorphological mesoregion of the Czech Republic
- Lower Morava Valley, a geomorphological formation in the Czech Republic and Slovakia
- Moravia (wine region)
- Moravia, a historic country comprising the east of the Czech Republic
- Great Moravia, early-medieval Empire in Central Europe

== Other ==
- Morava (cigarette), a Serbian brand
- Morava Airport, an airport in Serbia
- Let L-200 Morava, a two-engine Czech touring and light passenger aircraft
- LRSVM Morava, a Serbian multiple rocket launcher system
- Jack Morava (1944–2025), American mathematician
- The proper name of the star WASP-60

== See also ==
- Moravica (disambiguation) ("little Morava")
- Moravice (disambiguation)
- Morawa (disambiguation)
- Moravia (disambiguation)
- Moravany (disambiguation)
- Morávka (disambiguation)
- Moravec (disambiguation)
- Moravčík, a surname
- Morvan, an east-central French region
