= Morawica =

Morawica may refer to:

- Morawica, Lesser Poland Voivodeship, Poland
- Morawica, Świętokrzyskie Voivodeship, Poland
- Gmina Morawica, an administrative district in Kielce County, Świętokrzyskie Voivodeship, Poland

== See also ==
- Moravița
- Moravice (disambiguation)
- Moravec (disambiguation)
- Morawitz
