= Moravec (surname) =

Moravec (Czech: [ˈmoravɛts]; feminine: Moravcová) is a Czech surname. "Morava" (Moravia) is the root of the surname. It may refer to:

- David Moravec (born 1973), Czech ice hockey player
- Emanuel Moravec (1893–1945), Czech-Czechoslovak army officer, and Nazi collaborator
- František Moravec (1895–1966), Czech army officer and writer
- František Moravec (born 1939), Czech parasitologist
- Fritz Moravec (1922–1997), Austrian mountaineer
- Hans Moravec (born 1948), Austrian-Canadian scientist
- Ivan Moravec (1930–2015), Czech pianist
- Jan Moravec (born 1987), Czech footballer
- Jana Moravcová (1937–2018), Czech writer
- Jiří Moravec (born 1980), Czech ice hockey player
- Josef Moravec (born 1951), Czech painter
- József Moravetz (1911–1990), Romanian footballer
- Klára Moravcová (born 1983), Czech skier and biathlete
- Martina Moravcová (born 1976), Slovak swimmer
- Miroslav Moravec (1939–2009), Czech actor
- Ondřej Moravec (born 1984), Czech biathlete
- Paul Moravec (born 1957), American composer
- Roman Moravec (1950–2009), Slovak athlete
- Rosemary Dorothy Moravec (1946–2013), Austrian-British musicologist, author and composer
- Stanislav Moravec (born 1964), Slovak footballer
- Vlastimil Moravec (1949–1986), Czech cyclist
- Zdeněk Moravec (born 1968), Czech astronomer

== See also ==
- Moravčík
- Morávek
- Morawetz
- Morawitz
