= Morawetz =

Morawetz is a Germanized variant of the Czech surname Moravec. It may refer to:

- Cathleen Synge Morawetz (1923–2017), Canadian mathematician
- Geoffrey B. Morawetz, Canadian judge
- Herbert Morawetz (1915–2007), American chemical engineer
- Oskar Morawetz (1917–2007), Czech-Canadian composer
- Wilfried Morawetz (1951–2007), Austrian botanist

== See also ==
- Moravčík
- Morávek
- Moravek
- Morawitz
