= Moravia (disambiguation) =

Moravia is a historical region in the Czech Republic.

Moravia may also refer to:

== Places ==
=== United States ===
- Moravia, Baltimore, Maryland, a neighborhood in northeast Baltimore
- Moravia, Iowa, a small city
- Moravia, New York, a town
  - Moravia (village), New York, within the town

=== Elsewhere ===
- Margraviate of Moravia, a Mark in the Holy Roman Empire
- Archbishopric of Moravia, a former Catholic ecclesiastical province
- Moravia (canton), Costa Rica
- The Latin name for Moray, a county in Scotland

== People ==
- Alberto Moravia, pen name of Italian writer Alberto Pincherle (1907–1990)
- Charles Moravia (1875–1938), Haitian poet, dramatist, teacher, and diplomat

== Other uses ==
- Moravia (insect), a genus of fossil insects
- Moravia Consulting spol. s r.o., a manufacturer of electronic calculators
- FC Moravia FCM, a football club based in Moravia, Costa Rica
- Moravia High School, Moravia, Iowa
- Moravia station, Moravia, Iowa, a historic train station
- Moravia, a steam locomotive built in 1837 - see KFNB – Austria and Moravia
- The former name of the Finnish melodic death metal band Tracedawn

== See also ==
- Great Moravia, a European state in the 9th century
- Moravian (disambiguation)
- Morava (disambiguation)
