= Zuzana Moravčíková =

Zuzana Moravčíková may refer to:

- Zuzana Moravčíková (ice hockey) (born 1980), Slovak ice hockey forward
- Zuzana Moravčíková (runner) (born 1956), former Czechoslovak track athlete

== See also ==
- Moravčík, a surname
