= Morávek =

Morávek (feminine Morávková) is a Czech surname. Notable people with the surname include:

- Bill Moravek, former football player and coach
- Jan Morávek, Czech footballer
- Jan Morávek (1902–1984), member of the Czech Resistance against the German occupation (1939–1945) in Czechoslovakia
- Tamara Morávková (born 2003), Slovak footballer
- Václav Morávek, Czech general
- Veronika Morávková, Czech ice dancer
- Vladimír Morávek (born 1965), Czech director, screenwriter, and actor

== See also ==
- Moravčík
- Moravec (surname)
- Moravetz
- Morawetz
- Morawitz
