= Justice Center (disambiguation) =

Typically, a jail or prison.

Justice Center or Justice Centre may refer to:

- Justice Centre Leoben, Styria, Austria
- Justice Centre for Constitutional Freedoms, Calgary, Alberta, Canada
- Hamilton County Justice Center, Cincinnati, Ohio, United States
- Justice Center, Asheville, North Carolina, United States
- Justice Center Complex, Cleveland, Ohio, United States
- Multnomah County Justice Center, Portland, Oregon, United States
