= Nicole Brown (social scientist) =

Social researcher and author with special expertise in social research practice

Nicole Brown FRSA
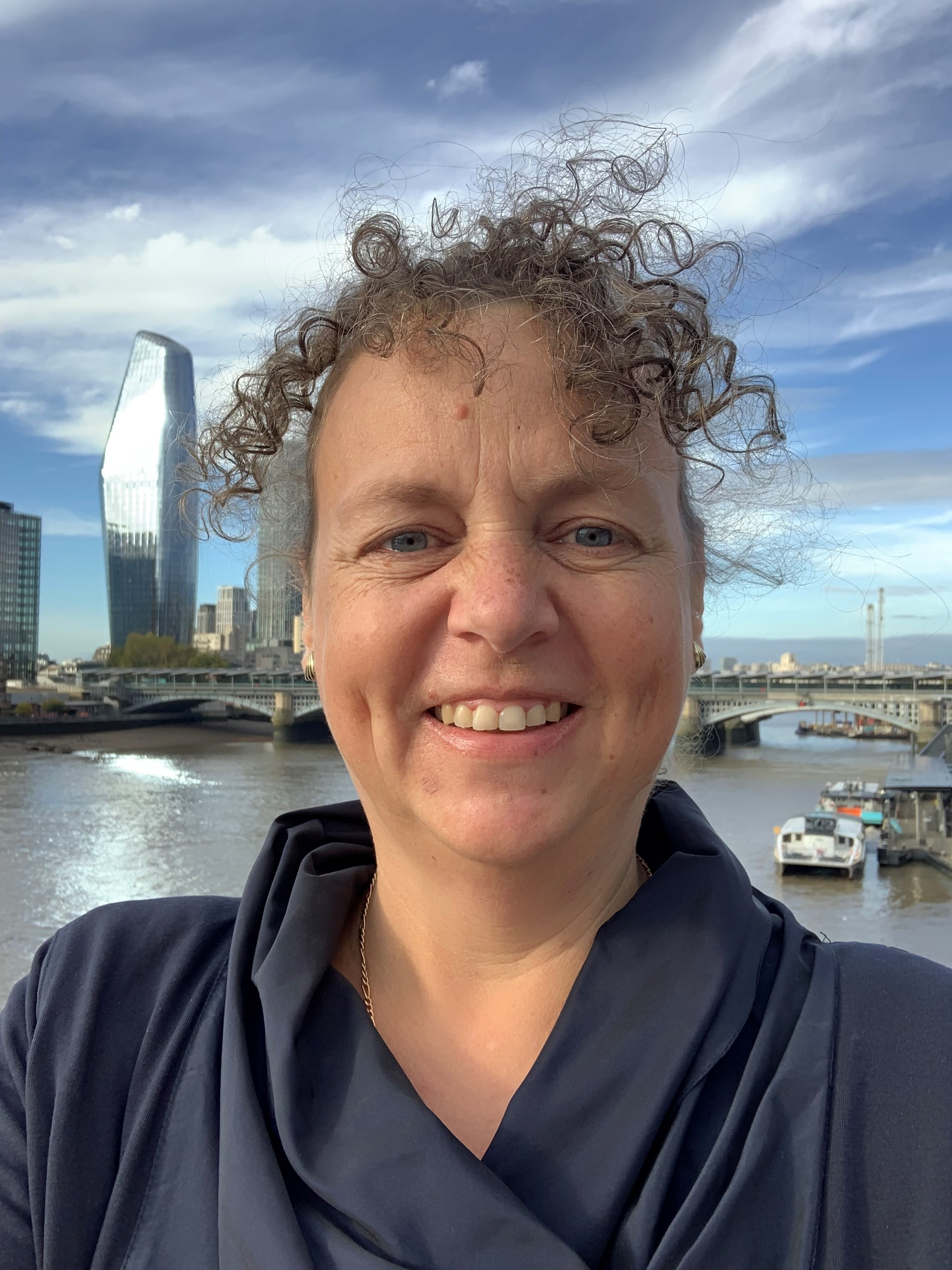
- Born: Nicole Kraller; 1976 (age 49–50); Leoben, Austria
- Education: Universität Wien and University of Kent
- Employer(s): University College London, Director of Social Research & Practice and Education
- Known for: Social research practice Intersection of practice-research-teaching
- Website: www.nicole-brown.co.uk

Nicole Brown (born 1976) is an Austrian and British writer and academic whose expertise lies with social research practice. She focuses on the development and pragmatics of research methods and approaches for data analysis as well as dissemination.

== Education ==
Brown has a teaching qualification (2001), a Magister degree from the University of Vienna (2001), a master's degree in teaching from the UCL Institute of Education (2006), a diploma in translation from the University of London (2008). She has a 2018 postgraduate certificate in higher education, a 2020 masters degree in higher education, and a PhD in sociology, all from the University of Kent.

== Career ==
Associate Professor and IOE Head of Research Ethics and Integrity at University College London, and Director of Social Research & Practice and Education Ltd.

Brown researches physical and material representations of experiences, the generation of knowledge and use of metaphors to express what is difficult to express, and more generally, research methods and approaches to explore identity and body work.

Brown is an editor for the Journal of Participatory Research Methods, Disability and Society, and The Qualitative Report. She is a long-standing member of methodologically-orientated organisations, such as the Pedagogy Network of the National Centre for Research Methods and the Centre for Imaginative Ethnography.

Brown is regularly invited as a keynote presenter and workshop leader, as for example for the National Centre for Research Methods, the Social Research Association, the American Association for Public Opinion Research, Photovoice Worldwide, as well as symposia and network conferences. On 26 June 2023 Brown delivered the keynote for the European Educational Research Association's Summer School in Porto.

Her exploration of research paradigms, data collection methods, and data analysis recognises the researchers' interactions with the field of study, the research participants, the research contexts, and settings, as well as the variety of practices involved in developing understanding and generating knowledge through thinking-doing-being. In that sense, her creative practices as a fiction writer and poet as well as her activist work in response to, on the back of and as research represent an extension of her conceptualisation of research practice that interweaves practice/teaching/research.

In 2025 Brown was named one of the world’s top 2% most-cited scientists in education in the Stanford University ranking.

== Publications ==
=== Books ===
- Brown, N., Ince, A. & Ramlackhan, K. (eds.). (2024). Creativity in Education: International Perspectives. UCL Press.
- Brown, N. (November 2023). Photovoice, Reimagined. Policy Press. ISBN 9781447369387.
- Brown, N. (2021). Making the Most of Your Research Journal. Bristol: Policy Press. ISBN 9781447360049.
- Leigh, J. S. & Brown, N. (2021). Embodied Inquiry: Research Methods. Bloomsbury. ISBN 9781350118799.
- Brown, N. (ed.) (2021). Lived Experiences of Ableism in Academia: Strategies for Inclusion in Higher Education. Bristol: Policy Press. ISBN 9781447354116
- Brown, N. & Leigh, J. S. (eds.) (2020). Ableism in Academia: Theorising Experiences of Disabilities and Chronic Illnesses in Higher Education. London: UCL Press. ISBN 9781787354999

== Awards and honors ==
- A 2016 winner of the Turnitin Global innovation Awards
- A 2018 Postgraduate Festival Prize Winner from the University of Kent
- In 2022, admitted as Fellow to the Royal Society of Arts
- UCL Education Awards 2023: recipient of the Faculty Education Award in Arts and Humanities and shortlisted for the UCL Provost Education Award in the category "Assessment and Feedback"
