= Christian Gratzei =

Austrian footballer

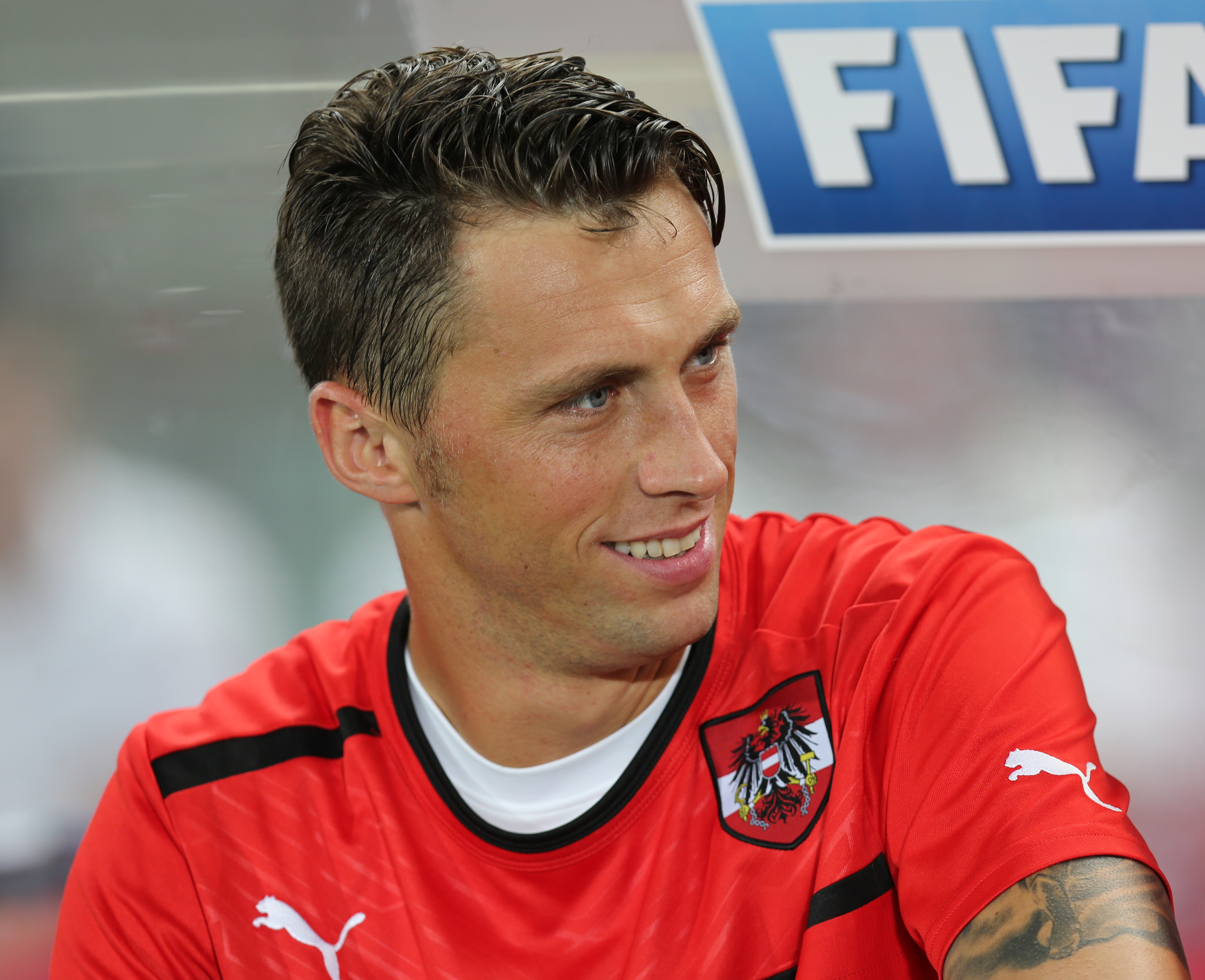

Personal information
- Date of birth: 19 September 1981 (age 45)
- Place of birth: Leoben, Austria
- Height: 1.85 m (6 ft 1 in)
- Position: Goalkeeper

Youth career
- 1987–1998: DSV Leoben

Senior career*
Years	Team	Apps	(Gls)
1998–2001	DSV Leoben	2	(0)
2001–2002	Grazer AK	0	(0)
2002–2018	SK Sturm Graz	257	(0)

International career^{‡}
2008–2012	Austria	10	(0)
- * Club domestic league appearances and goals as of 28 January 2017 ‡ National team caps and goals as of 15 August 2012

Christian Gratzei (born 19 September 1981 in Leoben) is an Austrian footballer currently playing as a goalkeeper.

== Career ==
=== DSV Leoben ===
Gratzei joined the Leoben youth academy in 1987, at the age of six. He spent 11 years in the youth ranks before finally being promoted to the senior squad in 1998.

=== Grazer AK ===
On 1 July 2001, Gratzei was sold to Grazer AK. He spent his entire time at Grazer AK playing with the second team.

=== Sturm Graz ===
On 1 July 2002, Gratzei moved to SK Sturm Graz.

== Honors ==
SK Sturm Graz

- Austrian Football Bundesliga: 2010-11
- Austrian Cup: 2009-10
