= Resistance in the Protectorate of Bohemia and Moravia =

Resistance movements within German-occupied Czechoslovakia during WWII

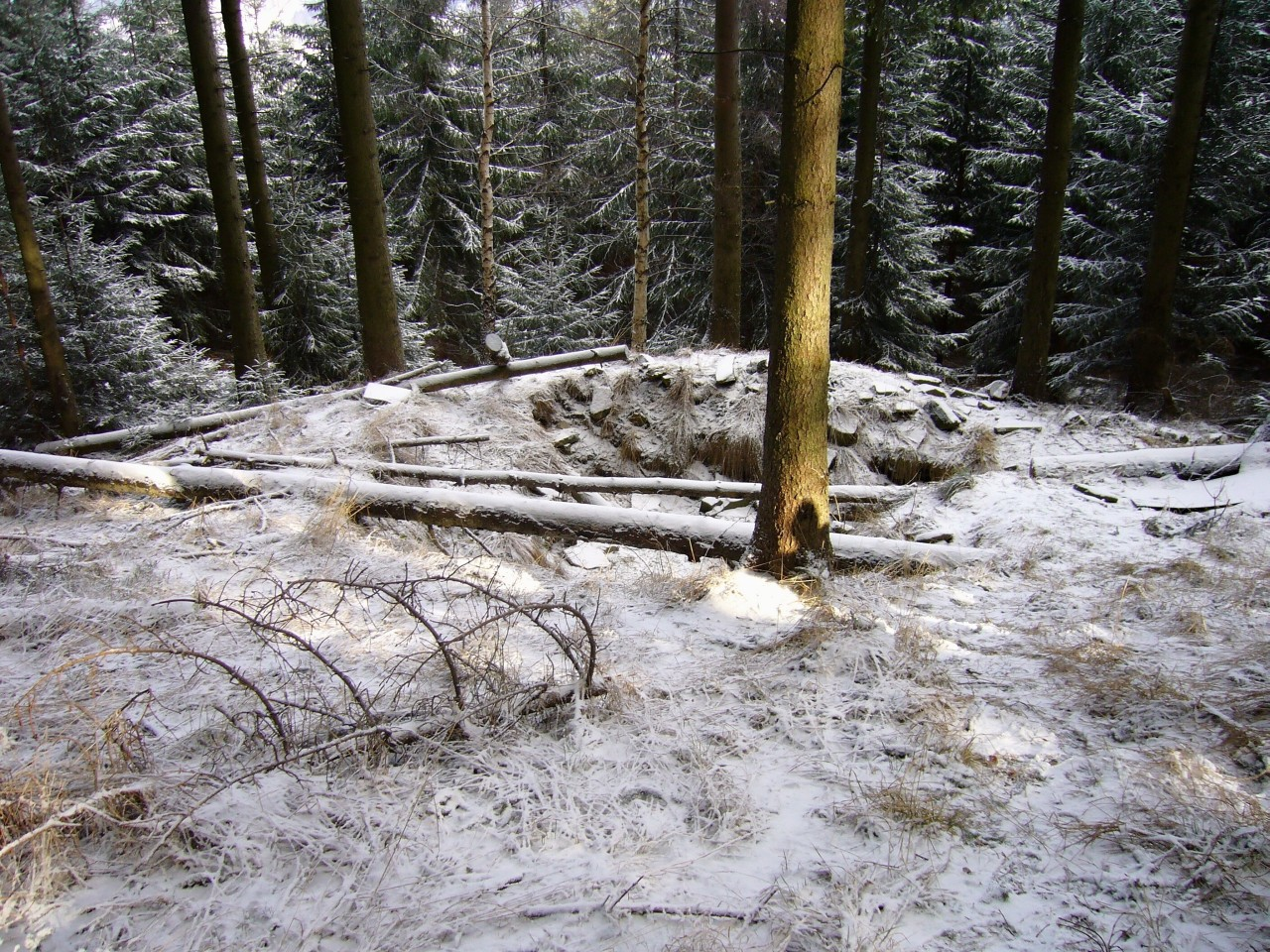
Partisan bunker outside of Morávka in the Moravian-Silesian Beskids.

Czechoslovak resistance to the German occupation of the Protectorate of Bohemia and Moravia during World War II began after the occupation of the rest of Czechoslovakia and the formation of the protectorate on 15 March 1939. Similar resistance could be found in the German speaking parts of the Czechoslovakia Sudetendeutscher Widerstand gegen den Nationalsozialismus. German policy deterred acts of resistance and annihilated organizations of resistance. In the early days of the war, the Czech population participated in boycotts of public transport and large-scale demonstrations. Later on, armed communist partisan groups participated in sabotage and skirmishes with German police forces. The most well-known act of resistance was the assassination of Reinhard Heydrich. Resistance culminated in the so-called Prague uprising of May 1945; with Allied armies approaching, about 30,000 Czechs seized weapons. Four days of bloody street fighting ensued before the Soviet Red Army entered the nearly liberated city.

== Consolidation of resistance groups: ÚVOD ==
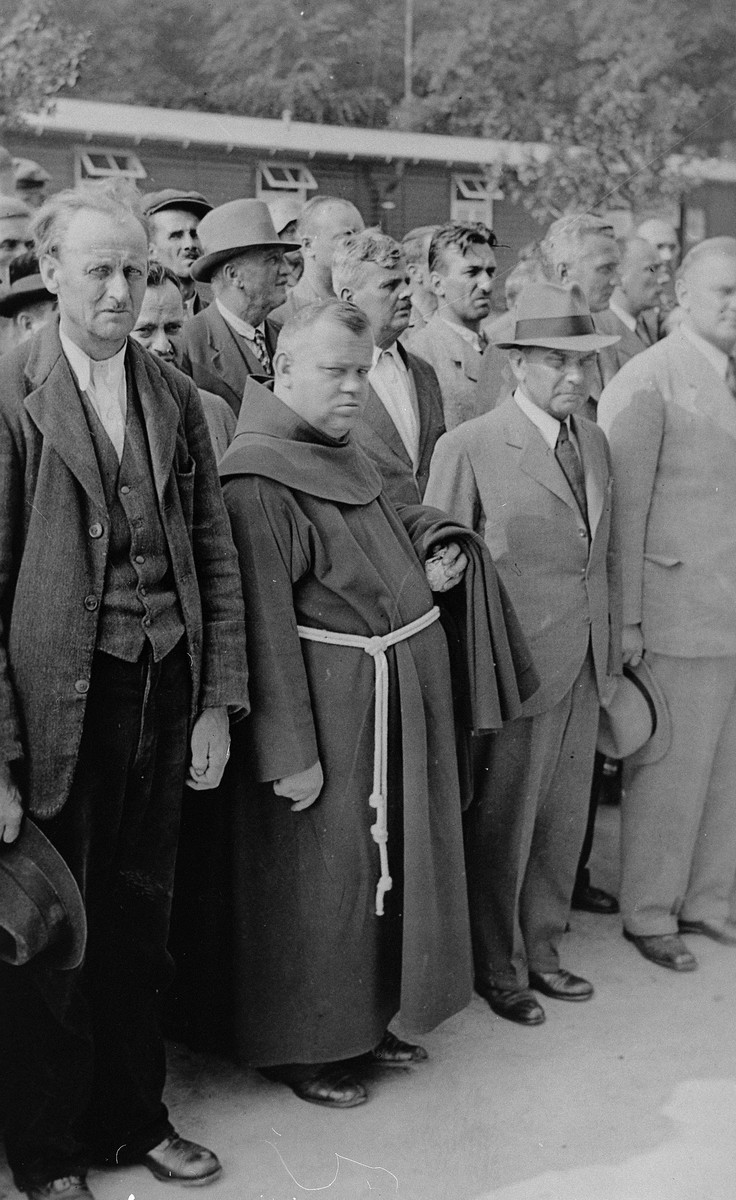
Czech prisoners at Buchenwald in 1939, including a Franciscan friar.

The Czech resistance network that existed during the early years of the Second World War operated under the leadership of Czechoslovak president Edvard Beneš, who together with the head of Czechoslovak military intelligence, František Moravec, coordinated resistance activity while in exile in London. In the context of German persecution, the major resistance groups consolidated under the Central Leadership of Home Resistance (Ústřední vedení odboje domácího, ÚVOD). It served as the principal clandestine intermediary between Beneš and the Protectorate, which was in existence through 1941. Its long-term purpose was to serve as a shadow government until Czechoslovakia's liberation from Nazi occupation.

The three major resistance groups that consolidated under ÚVOD were the Political Centre (Politické ústředí, PÚ), the Committee of the Petition "We Remain Faithful" (Petiční výbor Věrni zůstaneme, PVVZ), and the Nation's Defence (Obrana národa, ON). These groups were all democratic in nature, as opposed to the fourth official resistance group, the Communist Party of Czechoslovakia (KSČ). Most of their members were former officers of the disbanded Czechoslovak Army. In 1941, ÚVOD endorsed the political platform designed by the leftist group PVVZ, titled "For Freedom: Into a New Czechoslovak Republic". In it, ÚVOD professed allegiance to the democratic ideals of past Czechoslovak president Tomáš Masaryk, called for the establishment of a republic with socialist features, and urged all those in exile to stay in step with the socialist advances at home.

In addition to serving as the means of communication between London and Prague, the ÚVOD was also responsible for the transmission of intelligence and military reports. It did so primarily through the use of a secret radio station, which could reach the Czech population. However, the ÚVOD was known to transmit inaccurate reports, whether false intelligence data or military updates. Sometimes this was intentional. Beneš often urged the ÚVOD to relay falsely optimistic reports of the military situation to improve morale or motivate more widespread resistance.

While the ÚVOD served as a principal aid to Beneš, it did sometimes depart from his policies. During the summer of 1941, the ÚVOD rejected Beneš' proposals for partial expulsion of the Sudeten Germans after the conclusion of the war and instead demanded their complete expulsion. The ÚVOD succeeded in changing Beneš' official stance on this issue.

== ÚVOD and the Communist Party of Czechoslovakia (KSČ) ==
Fourteen Czech intellectuals shot by the SS in Mauthausen.

The ÚVOD's relationship with the KSČ was an important aspect of its daily functions, as Soviet-Czech relations became a central part of their resistance efforts. The German invasion of the Soviet Union in June 1941 marked a turning point in Soviet-Czechoslovak relations. Before the invasion, "the main Communist objective was to stop the imperialist war" and was often sympathetic to the German workers of the Reich. After the invasion, the Resistance began to rely on communist support both within Czechoslovakia and from Moscow. In a broadcast from London on 24 June 1941 via the ÚVOD, Beneš informed his country that "the relationship between our two states thus returned to the pre-Munich situation and the old friendship."

While the KSČ was not an official part of the ÚVOD and kept its organisational independence, it called for unity of action with all anti-Fascist groups. Leaders of the KSČ ingratiated themselves with the ÚVOD by helping to maintain Soviet-Czechoslovak relations. Beneš often used these KSČ leaders to arrange meetings in Moscow to expand the Soviet-Czechoslovak partnership. There is some evidence that the ÚVOD may have warned the Russians about the German invasion in April 1941. In March 1941, Beneš received intelligence regarding a German build-up of troops on the Soviet Union's borders. According to his memoirs, he immediately passed on that information to the Americans, British and Soviet Union. The KSČ's fate was also closely linked with the ÚVOD's. It too suffered annihilation after the assassination of Reinhard Heydrich, unable to rebound until 1944.

== The Czechs and the Heydrich assassination ==
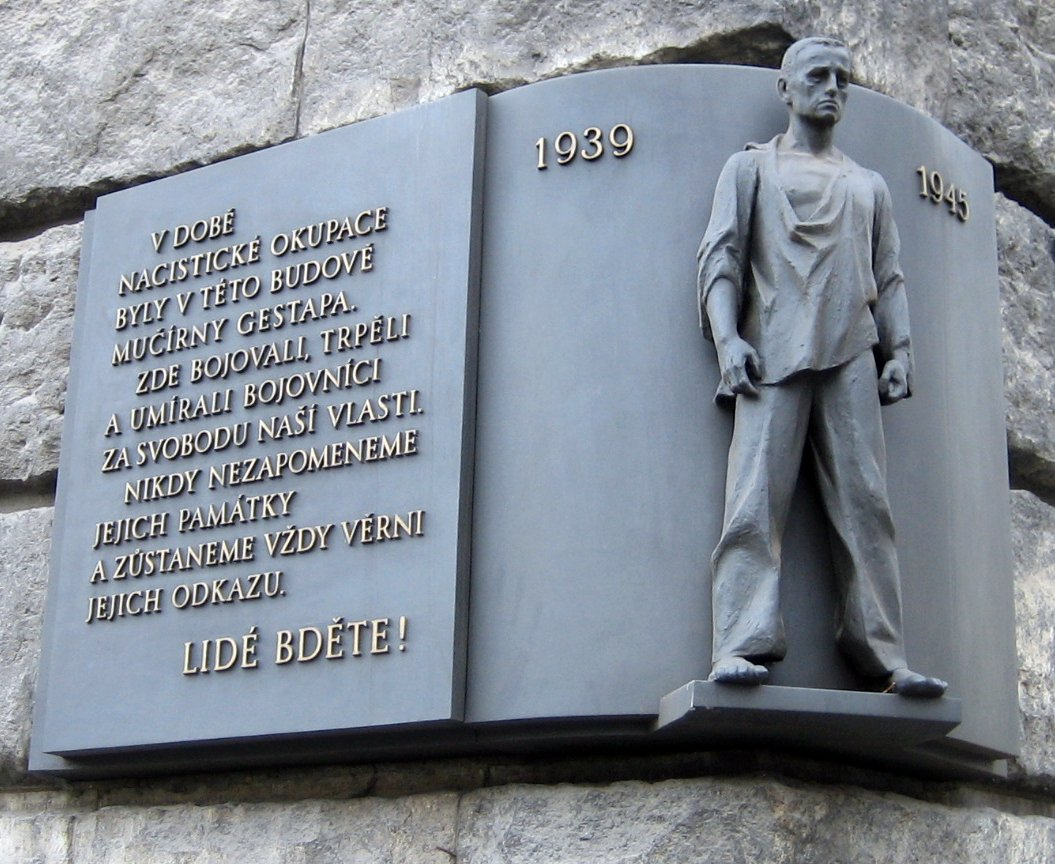
A plaque on the corner of Petschek Palace commemorates the victims of the Heydrichiáda.

The most famous act of the Czech and Slovak resistance was the assassination of Reinhard Heydrich on 27 May 1942 by exiled Czech soldier Jan Kubiš and Slovak Jozef Gabčík who had been parachuted into Bohemia by the British Royal Air Force. In many ways, the ÚVOD's demise was forecast with Heydrich's appointment as the Reichsprotektor of Bohemia and Moravia in the autumn of 1941. By the end of September, Heydrich had organised the arrest of nearly all members of the ÚVOD and successfully cut off all links between the ÚVOD and London.

The German reaction to Heydrich's assassination is often credited with the annihilation of an effective Czech underground movement after 1942. The Nazis exacted revenge, razing to the ground the two villages of Lidice and Ležáky. In October 1942, 1,331 people were sentenced to death by courts in the Protectorate, and 252 people were sent to Mauthausen, including minors, for involvement with the assassination plot. Finally, in the wake of German revenge, the last remaining members of the ÚVOD were arrested.

== Partisan warfare ==
The character of warfare changed dramatically after 1942. Partisan groups began to form in forested or mountainous areas. During the spring of 1945, partisan forces in Bohemia and Moravia had grown to 120 groups, with a combined strength of around 7,500 people. Partisans disrupted the railway and highway transportation by sabotaging track and bridges and attacking trains and stations. Some railways could not be used at night or on some days, and trains were forced to travel at a slower speed. There were more than 300 partisan attacks on rail communications from Summer 1944 to May 1945. Waffen-SS units retreating from the Red Army's advance into Moravia burned down entire villages as a reprisal. Partisan groups had a diverse membership including former members of Czech resistance groups fleeing arrest, escaped POWs, and German deserters. Other partisans were Czechs who lived in rural areas and continued with their jobs during the day, joining the partisans for night raids.

The largest and most successful group was the Jan Žižka partisan brigade, based in the Hostýn-Vsetín Mountains of southern Moravia. After crossing the border from Slovakia in September 1944, the Žižka brigade sabotaged railroads and bridges and raided the German police forces sent to hunt them down. Despite harsh countermeasures such as summary execution of suspected civilian supporters, the partisans continued to operate. Eventually, the Žižka brigade grew to over 1,500 people and was operating in large parts of Moravia upon the liberation of the area in April 1945.

== Prague uprising ==
On 5 May 1945, in the last moments of the war in Europe, citizens of Prague spontaneously attacked the occupiers and Czech resistance leaders emerged from hiding to guide them. German troops counterattacked, but progress was difficult due to the defection of the Russian Liberation Army and barricades constructed by the Czech citizenry. On 8 May, the Czech and German leaders signed a ceasefire allowing the German forces to withdraw from the city, but not all SS units obeyed. When the Red Army arrived on 9 May, the city was already almost liberated.

Because it was the largest Czech resistance action of the war, the Prague uprising became a national myth for the new Czechoslovak nation after the war and has been a common subject of literature. After the 1948 coup, the memory of the uprising was distorted by the Communist regime for propaganda purposes.

== Notable people ==
- Jan Morávek (1902–1984), Czech resistance member

== See also ==
- Ivančena

== Bibliography ==
- Bartošek, Karel (1965). The Prague Uprising. Artia.
- Beneš, Edvard (1954). Memoirs of Dr Eduard Benes: From Munich to New War and New Victory. Translated by Godfrey Lias. Connecticut: Greenwood Press.
- Crampton, RJ (1997). Eastern Europe in the Twentieth Century – and After. London and New York: Routledge. ISBN 0-415-16423-0.
- Hrošová, Marie (2012). Na každém kroku boj. Nové Město u Chlumce nad Cidlinou: Český svaz bojovníků za svobodu. ISBN 978-80-260-2483-5.
- Luža, Radomír (December 1969). "The Communist Party of Czechoslovakia and the Czech Resistance, 1939–1945". Slavic Review. 28 (4): 561–576. doi:10.2307/2493961. JSTOR 2493961. S2CID 155813819.
- Mahoney, William (18 February 2011). The History of the Czech Republic and Slovakia. ABC-CLIO. p. 191. ISBN 978-0-313-36306-1.
- Mastný, Vojtěch (1971). The Czechs Under Nazi Rule: The Failure of National Resistance, 1939–1942. New York: Columbia University Press. ISBN 0-231-03303-6.
- Orzoff, Andrea (2009). Battle for the Castle: The Myth of Czechoslovakia in Europe, 1914–1948. Oxford University Press. ISBN 978-0199709953.
- Pynsent, Robert B. [in Czech] (18 July 2013). "Conclusory Essay: Activists, Jews, The Little Czech Man, and Germans" (PDF). Central Europe. 5 (2): 211–333. doi:10.1179/174582107x190906. S2CID 144749278.
- Suchánková, Kateřina (2013). "Protipartyzánská operace Tetřev v roce 1944" (PDF). Masaryk University.
- Šír, Vojtěch (2015). "Útoky na železniční dopravu v Protektorátu Čechy a Morava (Attacks on rail transport in the Protectorate Bohemia and Moravia)". Fronta.cz.
