= Moravec =

Moravec may refer to:

== Places in the Czech Republic ==
- Moravec (Žďár nad Sázavou District), a municipality and village in the Vysočina Region
- Moraveč, a municipality and village in the Vysočina Region
- Moraveč, a village and part of Chotoviny in the South Bohemian Region
- Moraveč, a village and part of Slapsko in the South Bohemian Region

== People ==
- Moravec (surname), people with the surname Moravec

== Other ==
- Moravec (robot), a class of robots in the novel Ilium
- Moravec corner detection algorithm
- Moravec's paradox
