= Wolfgang Klapf =

Austrian footballer

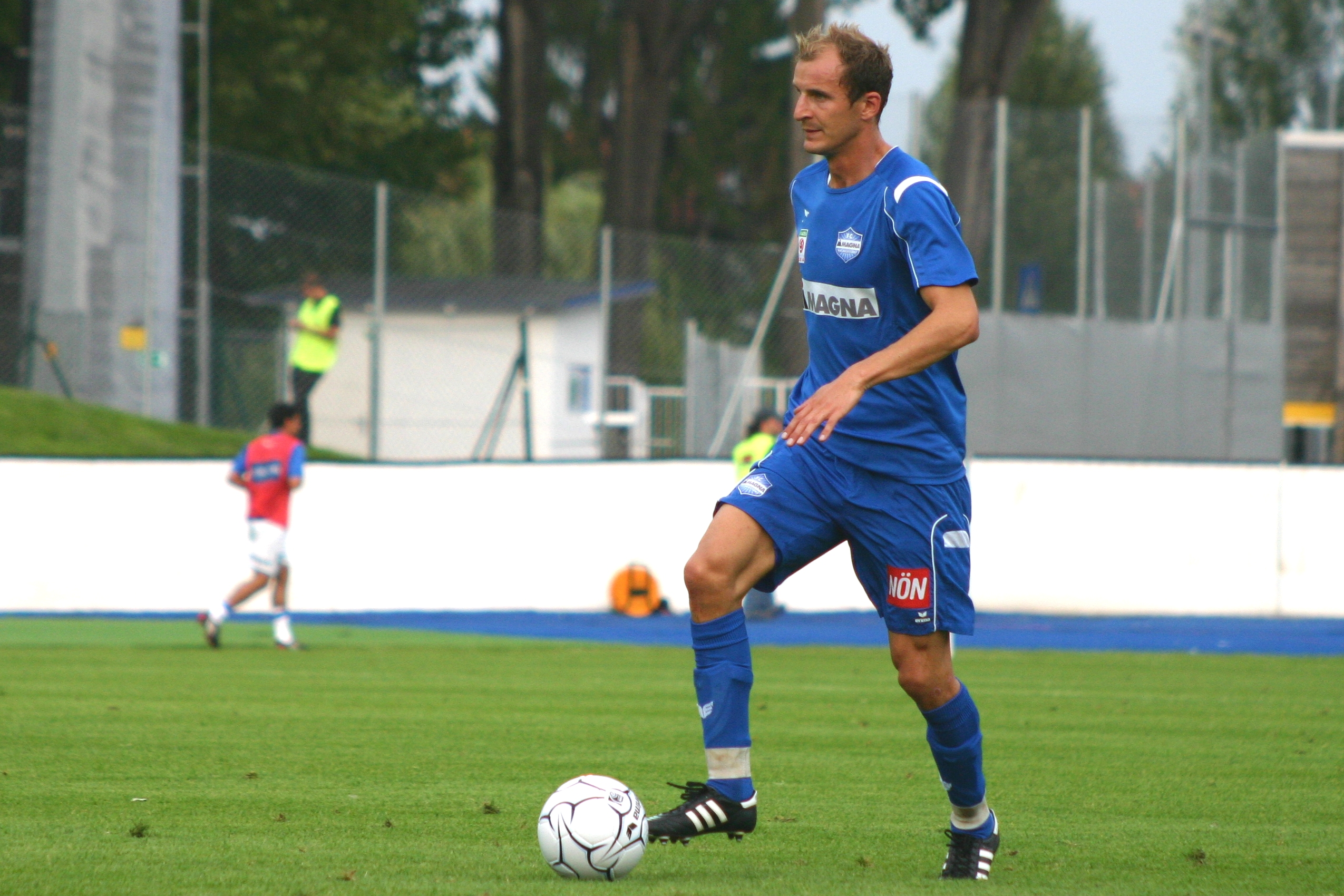

Personal information
- Full name: Wolfgang Klapf
- Date of birth: 14 December 1978 (age 47)
- Place of birth: Leoben, Austria
- Height: 1.80 m (5 ft 11 in)
- Position: Defender

Team information
- Current team: Union Weißkirchen
- Number: 13

Youth career
- SV Gams
- SV Rottenmann

Senior career*
Years	Team	Apps	(Gls)
2001–2005	DSV Leoben	128	(4)
2005–2008	LASK Linz	93	(5)
2008–2012	Wiener Neustadt	67	(0)
2012–2014	LASK Linz	49	(1)
2014–	Union Weißkirchen	171	(17)
- * Club domestic league appearances and goals as of 10:33, 26 October 2020 (UTC)

Wolfgang Klapf (born 14 December 1978) is an Austrian football player who plays for Union Weißkirchen.
