= Moravica =

Moravica ("little Morava") may refer to several places:

- Moravica District in Serbia
- Golijska Moravica, river in western Serbia
- Sokobanjska Moravica, river in eastern Serbia
- Preševska Moravica, river in southern Serbia, a source of the South Morava
- Stara Moravica, a village near Bačka Topola, Serbia

== See also ==
- Morava (disambiguation)
- Moravice (disambiguation)
