= Leoben =

- Municipality
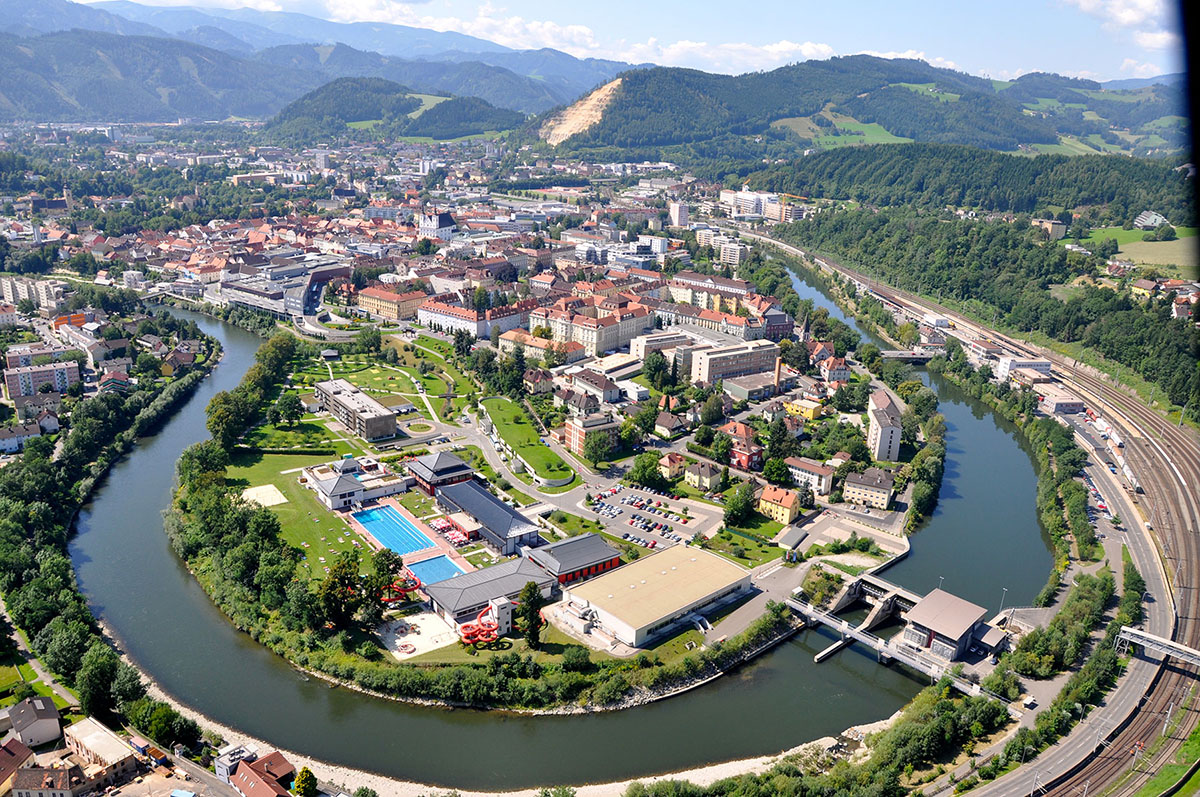
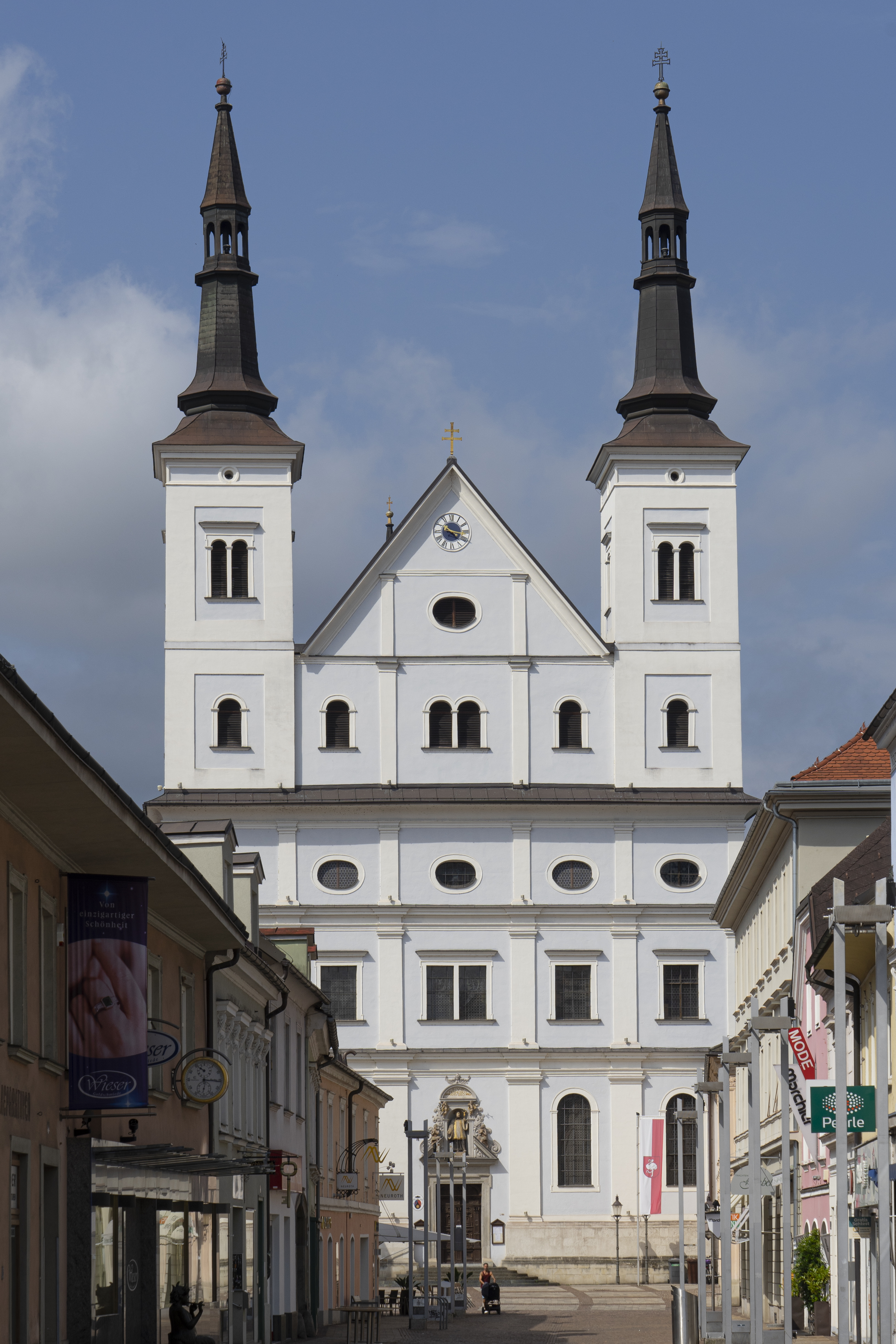
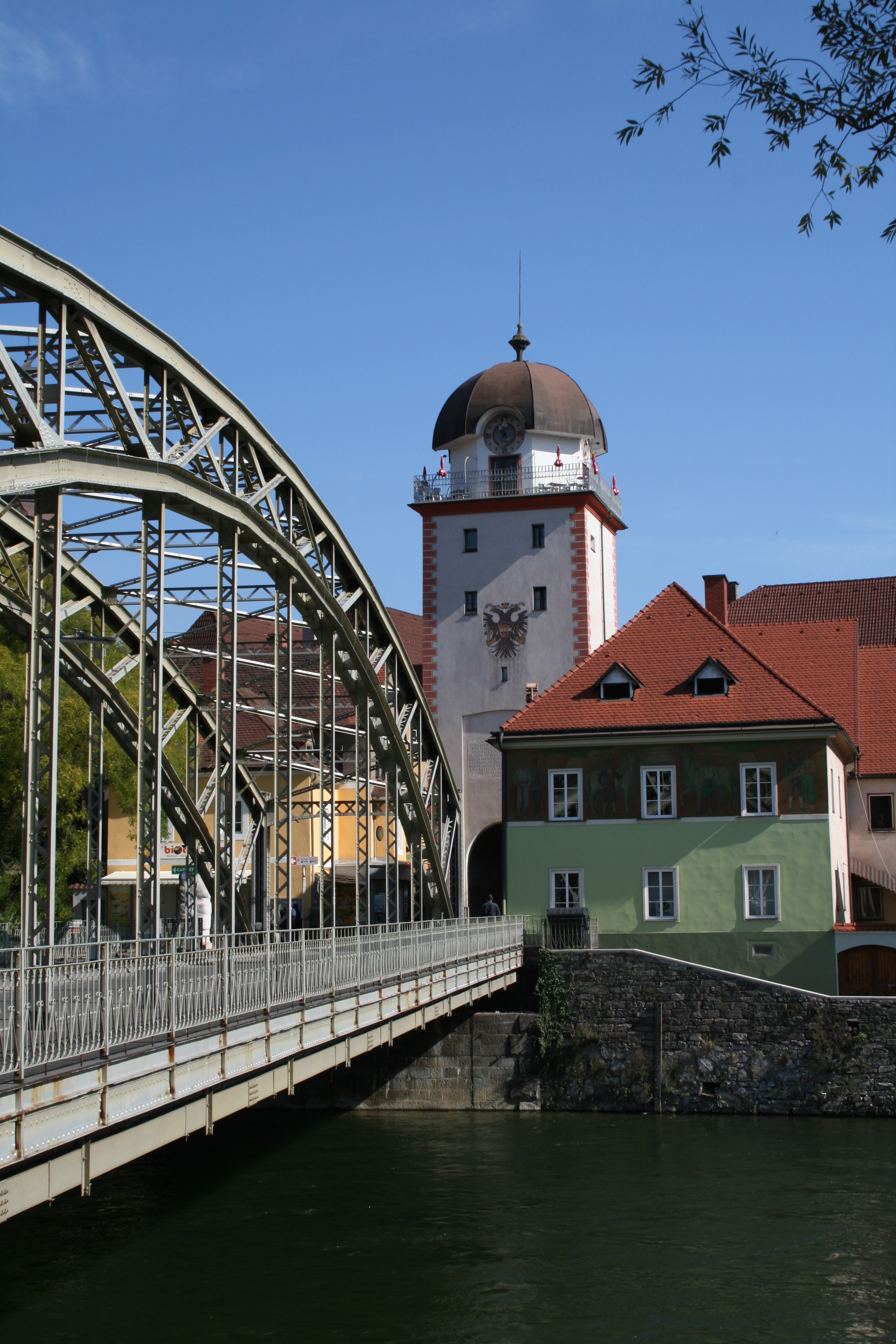
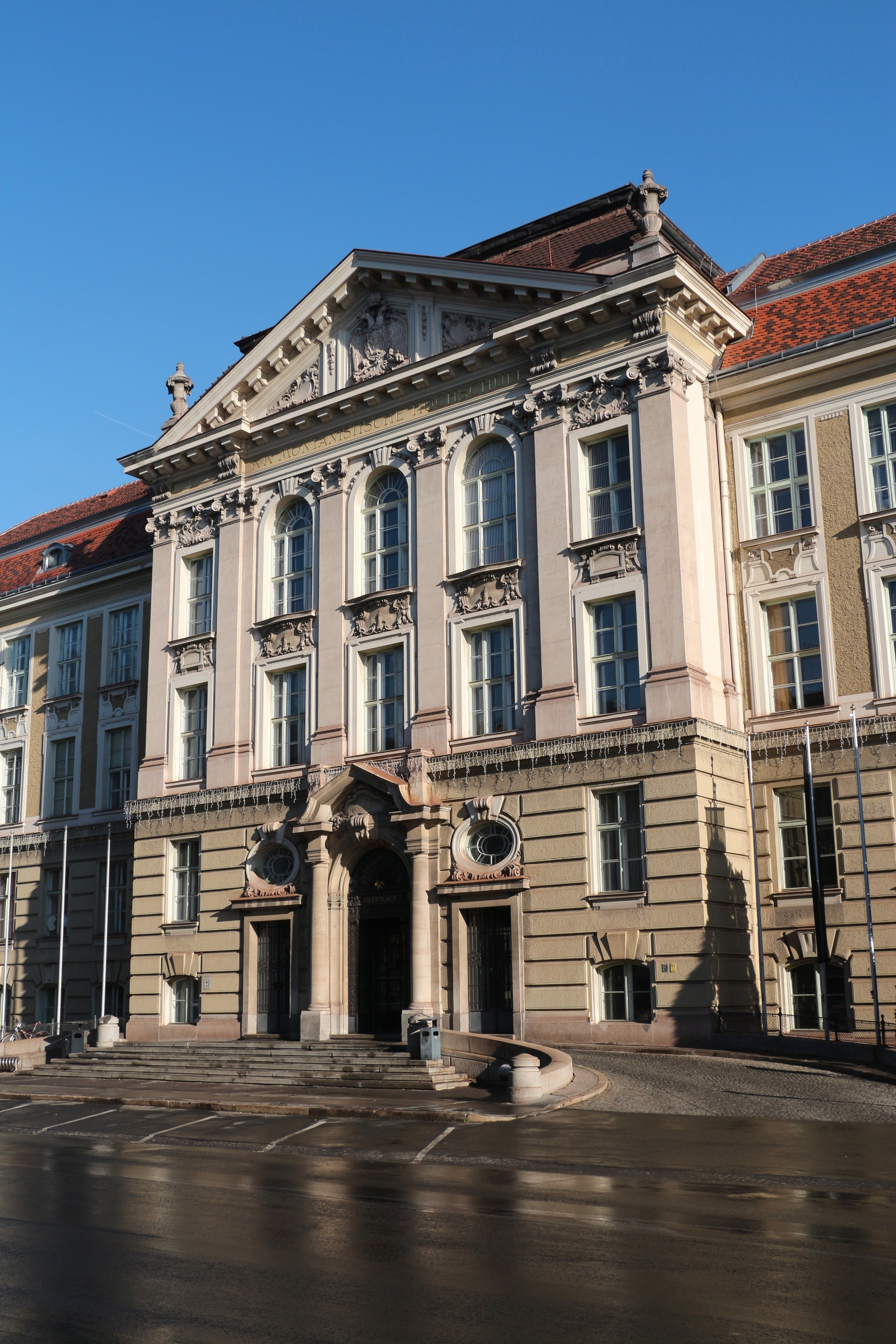
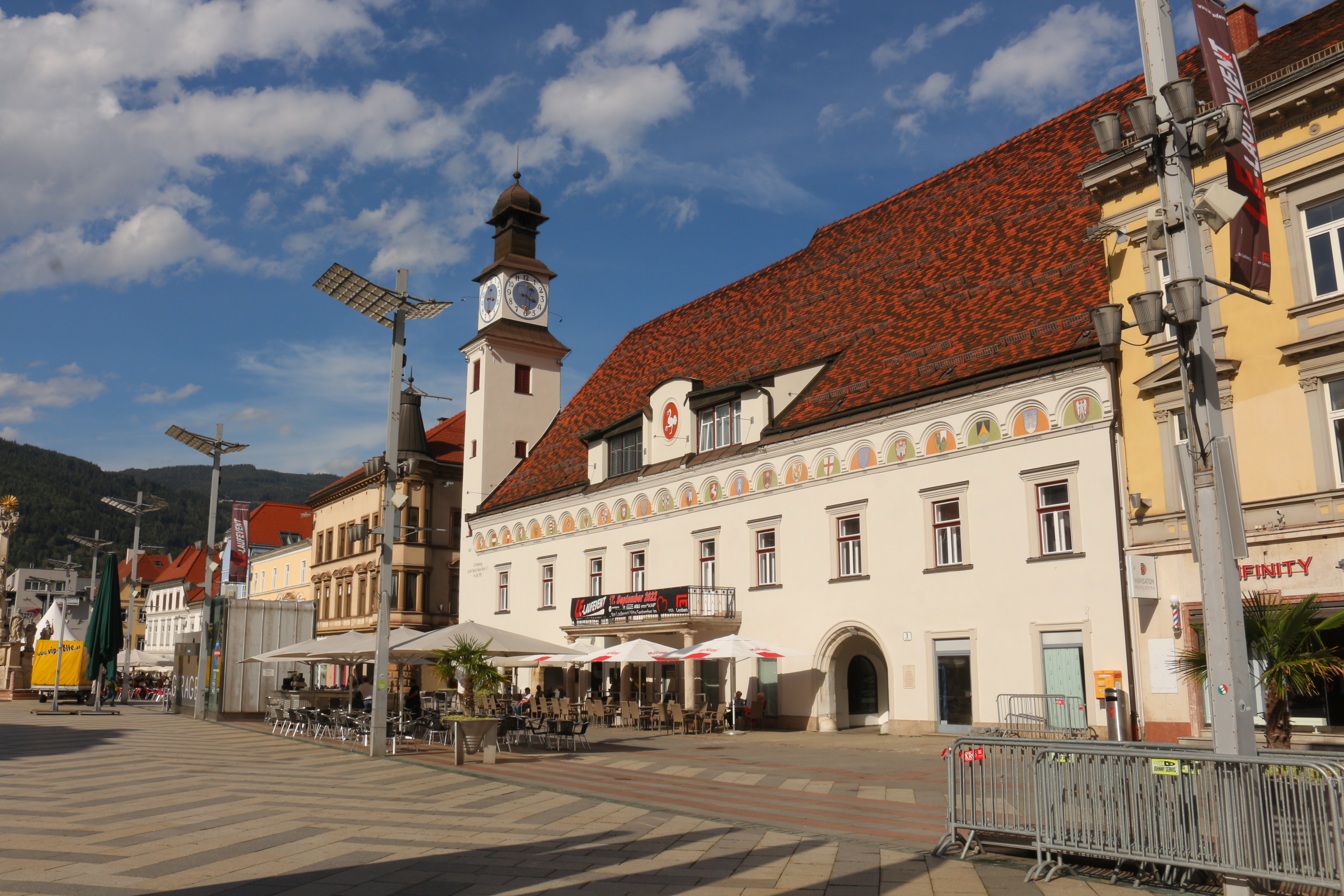
- Clockwise from top: Old town by the river Mur, City parish church, Schwammerlturm and Murbrücke, University of Leoben, Main Square with Old City Hall

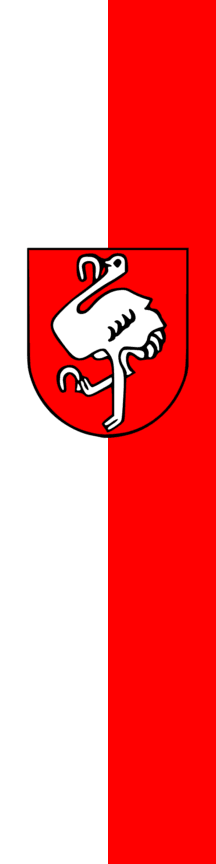
- Flag Coat of arms

- Location within Austria Leoben (Austria)
- Coordinates: 47°22′54″N 15°05′50″E
- Country: Austria
- State: Styria
- District: Leoben

Government
  - Mayor: Kurt Wallner (SPÖ)

Area
  - Total: 107.77 km^{2} (41.61 sq mi)
- Elevation: 541 m (1,775 ft)

Population (2018-01-01)
  - Total: 24,645
  - Density: 228.68/km^{2} (592.28/sq mi)
- Time zone: UTC+1 (CET)
  - Summer (DST): UTC+2 (CEST)
- Postal code: 8700
- Area code: 03842
- Vehicle registration: LE
- Website: www.leoben.at/en/

Leoben (German pronunciation: [leˈoːbn]) is a Styrian city in central Austria, located on the Mur river. With a population in 2023 of about 25,140 it is a local industrial centre and hosts the University of Leoben, which specialises in mining. The Peace of Leoben, an armistice between Austria and France preliminary to the Treaty of Campo Formio, was signed in Leoben in 1797.

The Justice Centre Leoben is a prison designed by architect Josef Hohensinn, which was completed in 2005.

== Etymology ==
Leoben was attested in historical sources as Liupina in 904 CE. The name is of Slavic origin, meaning 'beloved', and is derived from the root ljub- 'love'.

== Geography ==
Leoben is located in the Mur Valley, around 8 kilometres (5.0 mi) east of Sankt Michael in Obersteiermark and 15 kilometres (9.3 mi) west of Bruck an der Mur. The old town centre was founded in the Murschleife, a meander. Today Leoben stretches on both sides of the river.

The area of the municipality is around 108 km^{2} (42 sq mi), of which almost 79% is forested. The lowest point in the town is 515 metres (1,690 ft) above sea level, the highest point is the summit of the Wetterkogel at 1,643 metres (5,390 ft) above sea level.

== History ==
Leoben is known as the 'gateway to the Styrian iron road'. The 13th-century main square features the Hackl house with its baroque façade in red and white. The city parish church, Saint Francis Xavier, built in 1660, comprises a 17th-century interior and is considered one of the most significant Jesuit churches in Austria. Also of note is the Art Nouveau Lutheran church which is at the upper end of the Franz-Josef-Strasse.

The oldest convent for women in Styria is Göss Abbey. Founded in 1020 CE, it was run by the Benedictine nuns until it was dissolved in 1782 and made the see of short-lived Diocese of Leoben. The early Romanesque crypt is of note as is the Gösser Ornat, which can be seen in Vienna at the Museum for Applied Arts. Next to the convent is the Gösser brewery, which includes a brewery museum.

Current cultural events include classical concerts in the Congress Leoben, productions of the Summer Philharmonic in July and performances of local and guest productions in the oldest operating theatre in Austria.

DSV Leoben is an Austrian association football club based in Leoben. The club currently play in Austrian 2. Liga, the second tier of Austrian Football. They play at the Donawitz Stadium.

== Demographics ==
Historical population
Year	Pop.	±%
1869	11,062	—
1880	14,129	+27.7%
1890	17,900	+26.7%
1900	25,529	+42.6%
1910	29,462	+15.4%
1923	32,535	+10.4%
1934	31,112	−4.4%
1939	33,471	+7.6%
1951	35,653	+6.5%
1961	36,259	+1.7%
1971	35,598	−1.8%
1981	31,989	−10.1%
1991	28,897	−9.7%
2001	25,804	−10.7%
2011	24,598	−4.7%
2021	24,132	−1.9%
Source: Statistics Austria

Largest groups of foreign residents
Nationality	Population (2026)
Croatia	805
Romania	704
Ukraine	469
Bosnia and Herzegovina	462
Syria	433
Germany	339
Hungary	284
Russian Federation	273
Turkey	191
Serbia	191
Iran	169
Afghanistan	157
Slovakia	113
Italy	89
Bulgaria	88
Slovenia	74
Poland	67
Kosovo	51
Iraq	49
Czech Republic	33
North Macedonia	28

== Politics ==
The municipal assembly (Gemeinderat) consists of 31 members. Since the 2025 local elections, it is made up of the following parties:

- Social Democratic Party of Austria (SPÖ): 13 seats
- Freedom Party of Austria (FPÖ): 7 seats
- Austrian People's Party (ÖVP): 5 seats
- Communist Party of Austria (KPÖ): 3 seats
- Independent Bürgerliste (BL): 2 seats
- The Greens - The Green Alternative (GRÜNE): 1 seat

== Tradition and avantgarde ==
Leoben was shaped for centuries by the trade in iron and the research in raw materials carried out at the University of Leoben, which was founded in 1840. Mining traditions still play an important part in city life. Examples are the Miners' Parade, the Saint Barbara Celebration or the Ledersprung ('leather jump'). The Gösser Kirtag, a street fair, takes place on the Thursday after the first Sunday in October and attracts tens of thousands of visitors to Leoben.

Other components of the cultural life of Leoben include classical concerts in the Congress Leoben, productions of the Summer Philharmonics in July and performances of locally created and guest productions in the oldest still-running theatre in Austria.

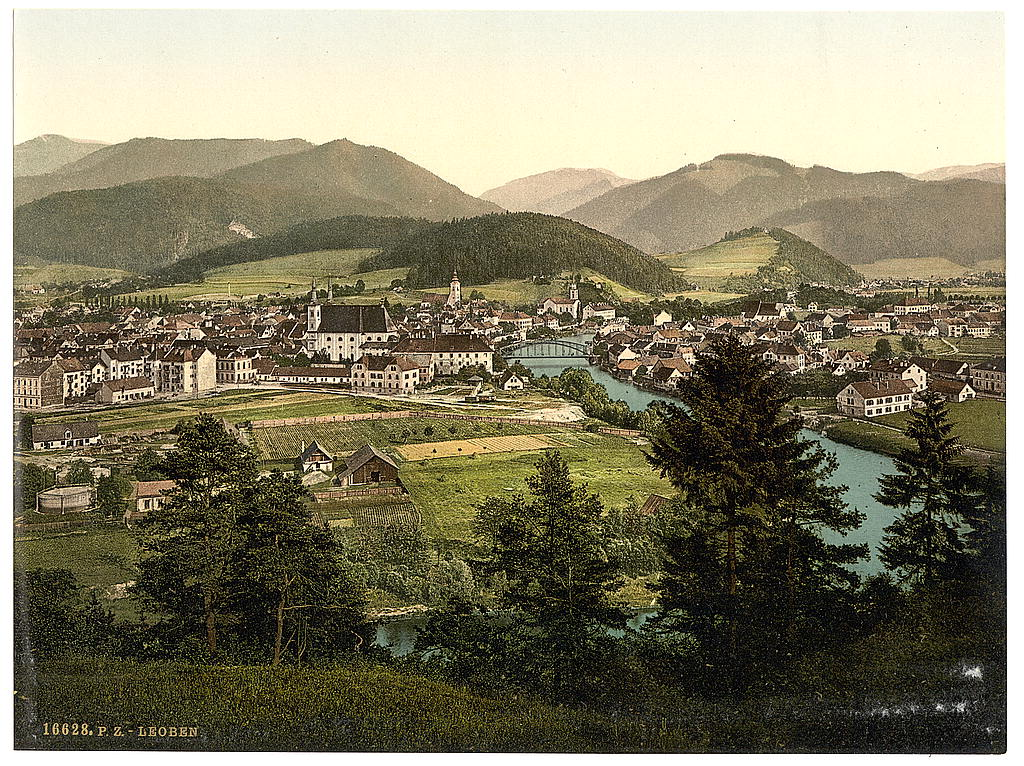
Leoben around 1900

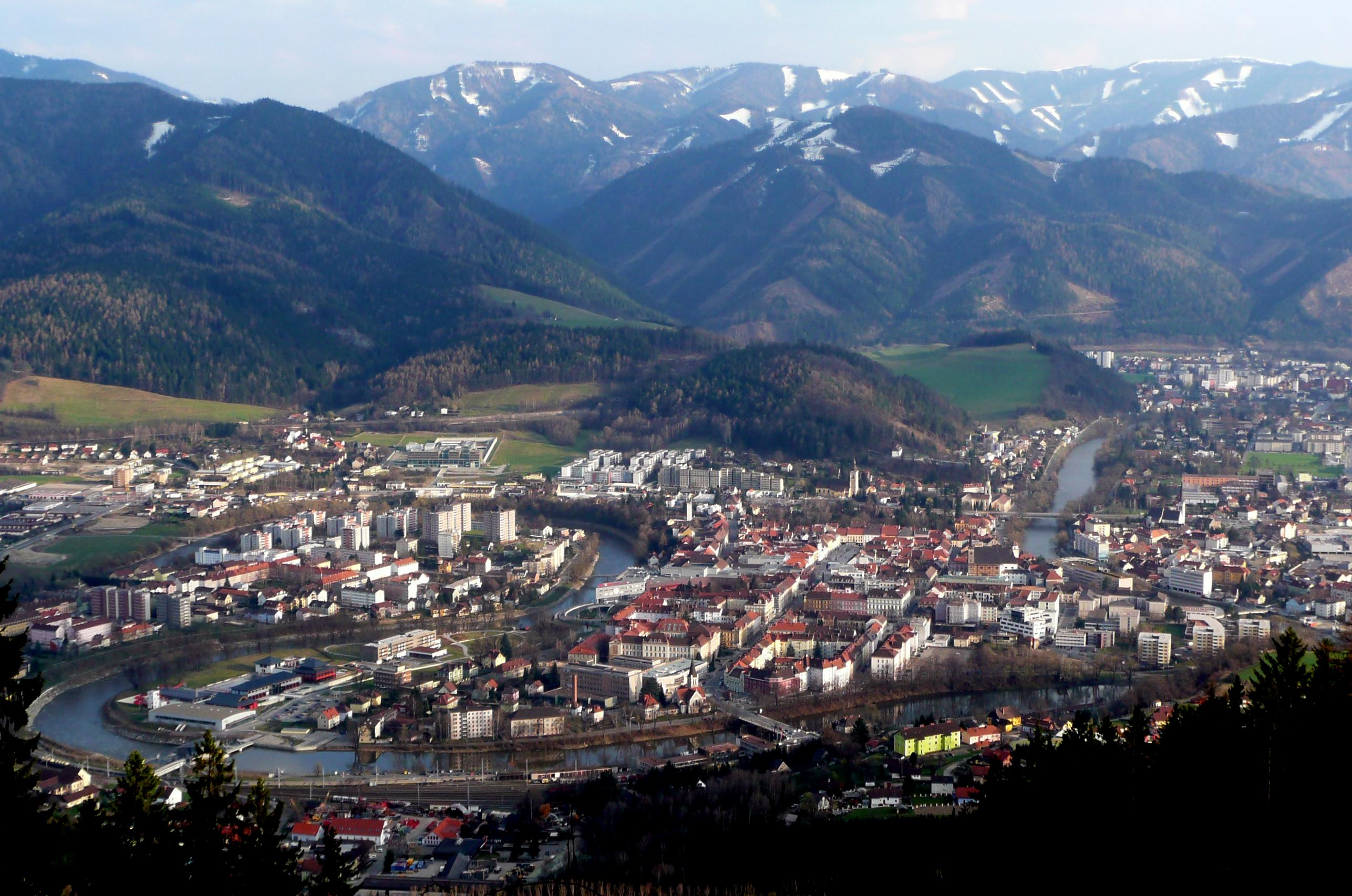
View of Leoben in 2009

== Notable people ==
- Hannes Arch (1967–2016), Austrian pilot who competed in the Red Bull Air Race World Championship from 2007 to 2016
- Nicole Brown (social scientist) (born 1976), Austrian and British writer and academic
- Lisa Eckhart (born 1992), Austrian comedian, poetry slammer and cabaret artist
- Gabriel Gruber SJ, (1740–1805), Austrian cleric and polymath of Slovenian descent
- Egon Kapellari (born 1936), RC bishop
- Friedl Kjellberg (1905–1993), Austrian-Finnish ceramicist, used the so-called 'rice grain' method of porcelain-making.
- Norbert Krebs (1876–1947), geographer
- Wilfried Morawetz (1951–2007), botanist
- Alma Seidler (1899–1977), Austrian actress, member of the Burgtheater for over 50 years
- Hannelore Valencak (1929–2004), Austrian physicist, novelist, poet and children's writer
- Martin Weinek (born 1964), actor and wine producer

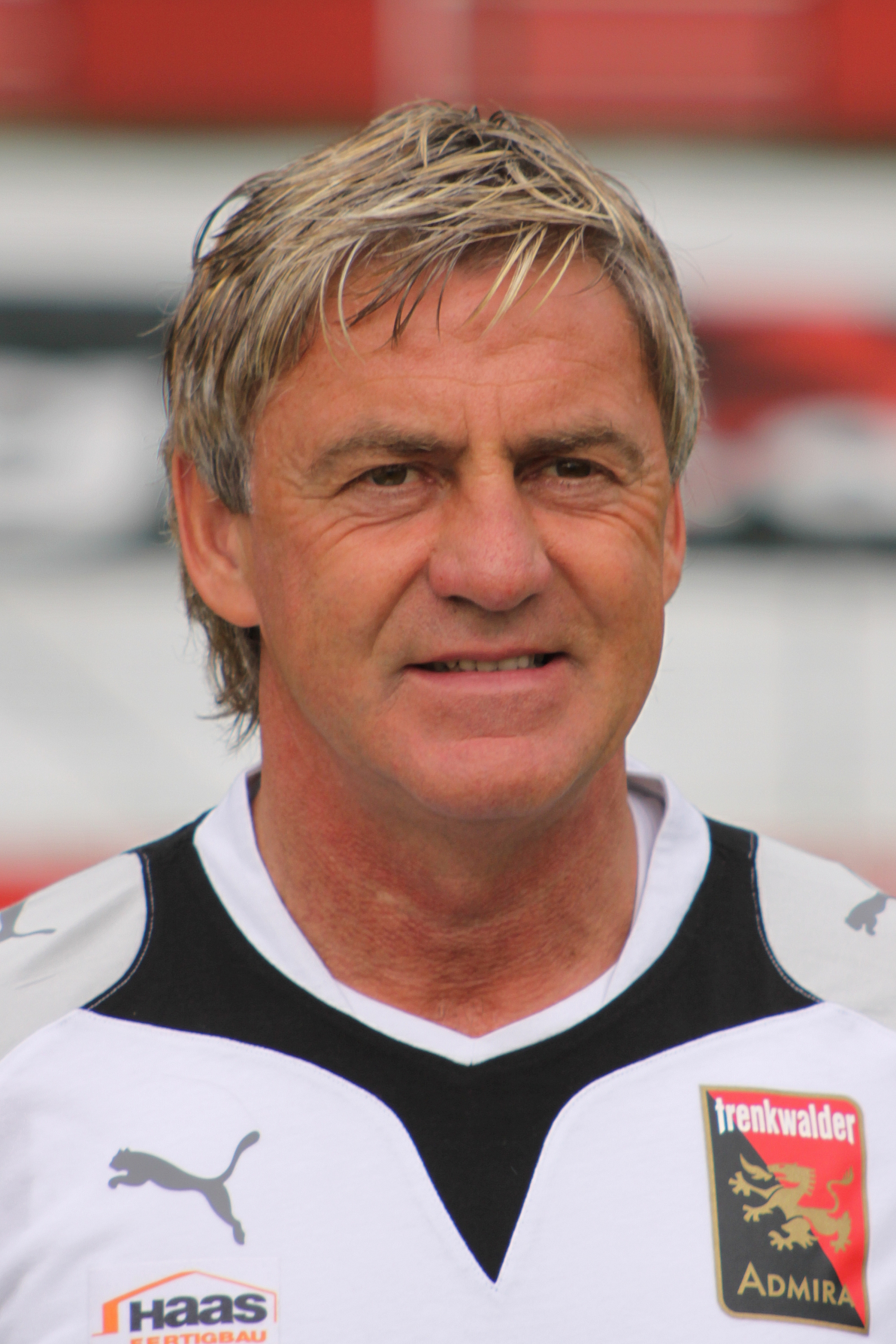
Walter Schachner, 2009

=== Sport ===
- Christian Gratzei (born 1981), Austrian football goalkeeper, played 257 games and 10 for Austria
- Boris Hüttenbrenner (born 1985), former footballer who played over 370 games
- Wolfgang Klapf (born 1978), Austrian football player who played over 500 games
- Roland Linz (born 1981), football player, played 368 games and 39 for Austria
- Gernot Plassnegger (born 1978), Austrian football coach and a former player who played over 390 games
- Chris Raaber (born 1981), professional wrestler, ring name "Bambikiller"
- Walter Schachner (born 1957), football player and trainer, played over 460 games and 64 for Austria
- René Schicker (born 1984), Austrian footballer and head coach, he played over 400 games
- David Sencar (born 1984), Austrian football coach and former player who played over 450 games
- Joachim Standfest (born 1980), football coach and former player who played over 540 games and 34 for Austria
- Christoph Strasser (born 1982), ultra-distance cyclist, rode over 1,000 kms (620 mi) in 24 hours in 2021
