= Moravian =

Moravian is the adjective form of the Czech Republic region of Moravia, and refers to people of ancestry from Moravia.

Moravian may also refer to:

- A member or adherent of the Moravian Church, one of the oldest Protestant Christian denominations
- Moravia, the region
- Moravians, people from Moravia
- Moravian dialects, dialects of Czech spoken in Moravia, sometimes considered a distinct Moravian language
- Moravané ("The Moravians"), a political party in the Czech Republic favouring the autonomy or independence of Moravia
- Moravian Academy, a private school in Bethlehem, Pennsylvania
- Moravian University, a private university in Bethlehem, Pennsylvania
- An inhabitant of the Scottish Moray, especially the historic Mormaer of Moray

== See also ==
- Moravia (disambiguation)
- Moravian Serbia, one of the Serbian states that emerged from the collapse of the Serbian Empire in the 14th century
- Moravian Wallachia, a cultural region in the eastern part of the Czech Republic
- Moravian Slovakia, a cultural region in the southeastern part of the Czech Republic, closely related to neighbouring Slovakia
- Moravian Church, Protestant denomination established in fifteenth century in historic region of Moravia
- Moravian Cemetery, a cemetery on Staten Island, New York City
- Moravian chicken pie
- Moravian Spice Cookies
- Moravian star, is an illuminated Advent or Christmas decoration popular in Germany and areas with Moravian Churches
- Moravian 47, Ontario, a First Nations reserve located in Chatham-Kent Ontario, Canada
- Moraviantown (disambiguation)
- Morvan, a traditional region of east-central France
