= Moraviantown =

Moraviantown may refer to:

- Battle of Moraviantown, better known as Battle of the Thames
- Moravian 47, Ontario, home of The Moraviantown Delaware Nation
- Munsee language, spoken only on the Moraviantown Reserve in Ontario, Canada by five living people
- Christian Munsee, also known as the Moravian Munsee

== See also ==
- Moravian (disambiguation)
