= Morawa =

Morawa may refer to:

- Morawa, Western Australia
  - Shire of Morawa
- Morawa, Lower Silesian Voivodeship (south-west Poland)
- Morawa, Warmian-Masurian Voivodeship (north Poland)
- Morawa language, a language of Papua New Guinea

== See also ==
- Morava (disambiguation)
