= Moraveč =

- Municipality
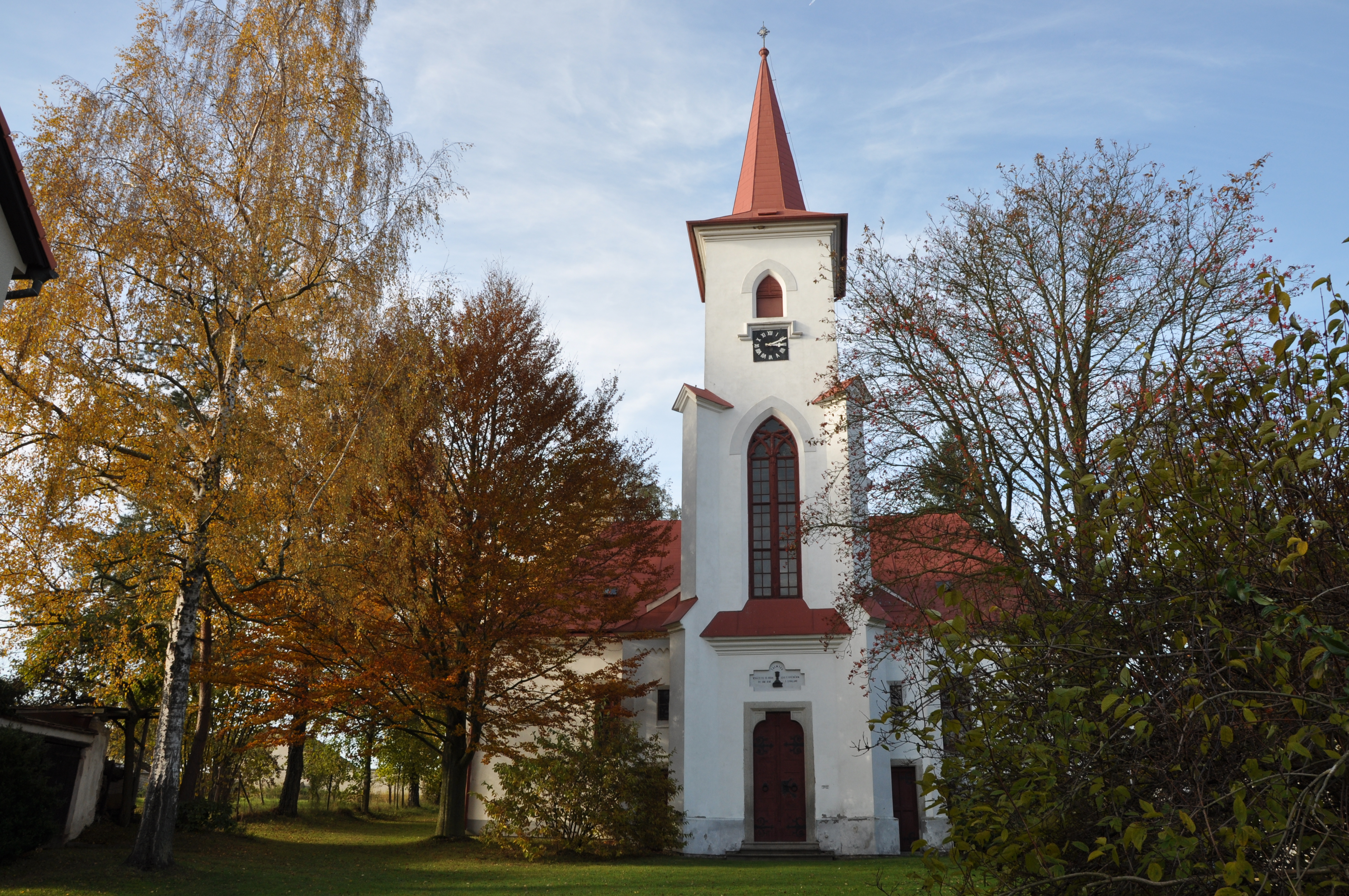
- Evangelical church

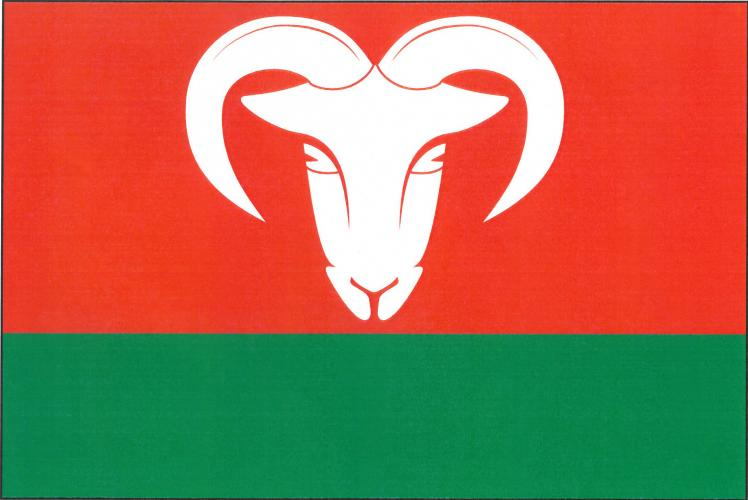
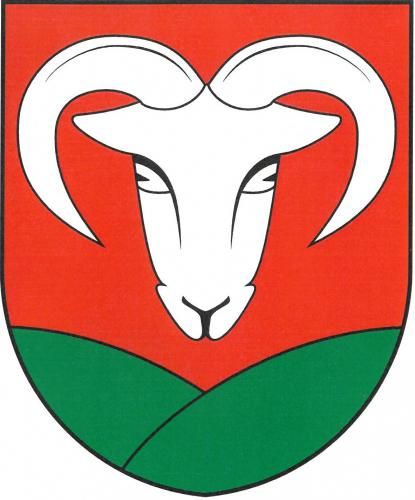
- Flag Coat of arms

- Location in the Czech Republic
- Coordinates: 49°24′33″N 15°4′37″E
- Country: Czech Republic
- Region: Vysočina
- District: Pelhřimov
- First mentioned: 1379

Area
  - Total: 9.01 km^{2} (3.48 sq mi)
- Elevation: 595 m (1,952 ft)

Population (2026-01-01)
  - Total: 205
  - Density: 22.8/km^{2} (58.9/sq mi)
- Time zone: UTC+1 (CET)
  - Summer (DST): UTC+2 (CEST)
- Postal code: 393 01
- Website: obecmoravec.cz

Moraveč is a municipality and village in Pelhřimov District in the Vysočina Region of the Czech Republic. It has about 200 inhabitants.

Moraveč lies approximately 11 kilometres (7 mi) west of Pelhřimov, 38 km (24 mi) west of Jihlava, and 90 km (56 mi) south-east of Prague.

== Demographics ==
Historical population
Year	Pop.	±%
1869	510	—
1880	553	+8.4%
1890	519	−6.1%
1900	551	+6.2%
1910	578	+4.9%
1921	535	−7.4%
1930	497	−7.1%
1950	342	−31.2%
1961	320	−6.4%
1970	314	−1.9%
1980	242	−22.9%
1991	212	−12.4%
2001	193	−9.0%
2011	192	−0.5%
2021	177	−7.8%
Source: Censuses
