= KFNB – Austria and Moravia =

KFNB Austria and Moravia
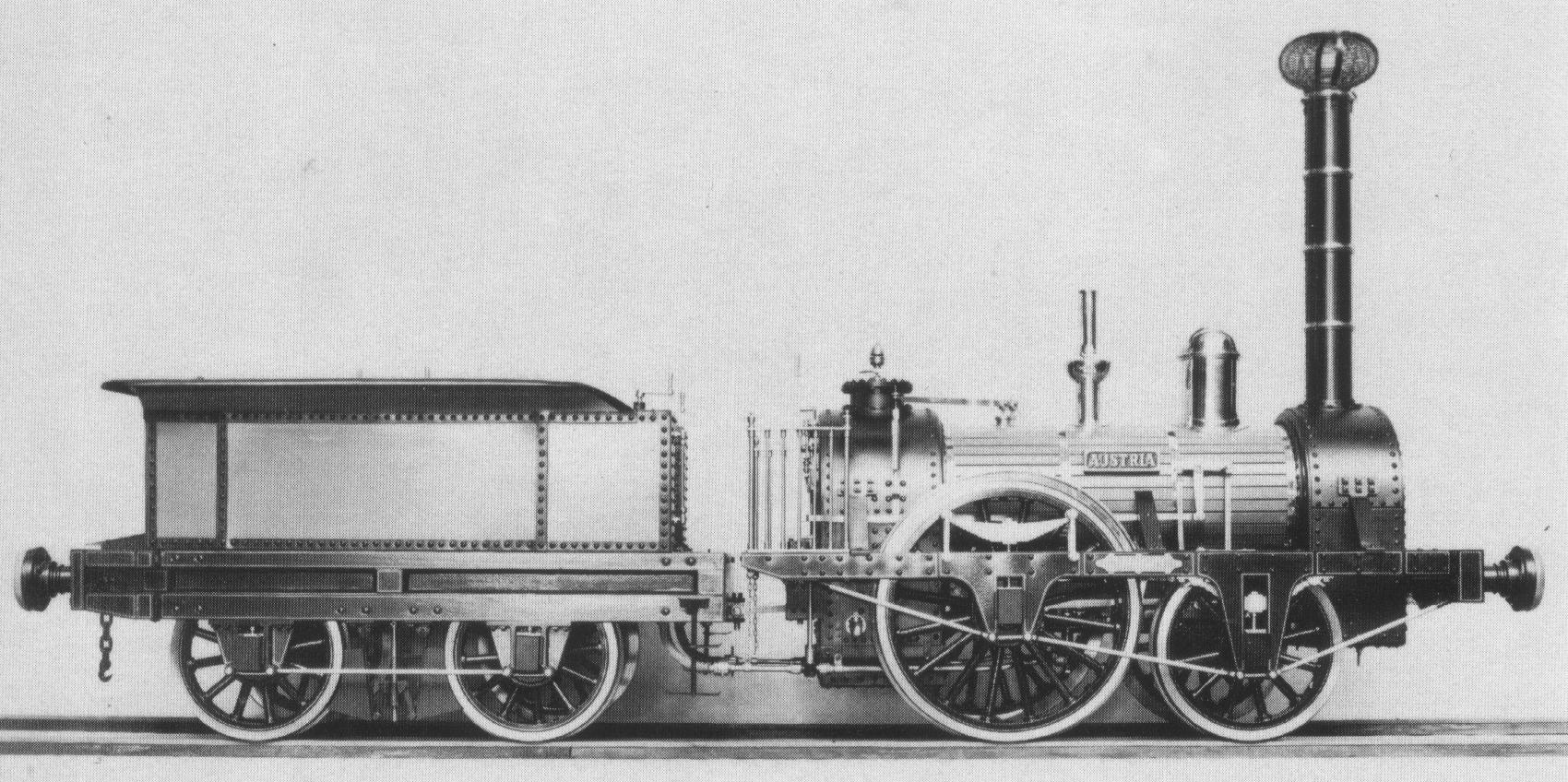
- The Austria. One of the first steam locomotives used in Austria
Type and origin
- Power type: Steam
- Builder: Robert Stephenson and Company
- Build date: 1837
- Total produced: 2
Specifications
- Configuration
  - Whyte: 2-2-0
  - UIC: 1A n2
- Leading dia.: 1,067 mm (3 ft 6 in)
- Driver dia.: 1,524 mm (5 ft 0 in)
- Wheelbase
  - Engine: 1,524 mm (5 ft 0 in)
- Loco weight: Service: 9.1 tonnes (9.0 long tons; 10.0 short tons)
- Firebox
  - Type
  - Grate area: 0.54 m^{2} (5.8 sq ft)
- Boiler pressure: 3.5 bar (350 kPa; 50.8 psi)
- Heating surface
  - Firebox: 3.10 m^{2} (33.4 sq ft)
  - Tubes: 25.00 m^{2} (269.1 sq ft)
  - Total surface
- Cylinders: Two, inside
- Cylinder size: 254 mm × 406 mm (10 in × 16 in)

The KNFB - Austria and Moravia were the two first steam locomotives used by the Kaiser Ferdinands-Nordbahn in Austria. The pair of 2-2-0 engines were built by Robert Stephenson and Company and delivered in 1837. The cylinders were arranged under the smokebox and drove the cranked second axle. The boiler was covered with wooden strips.

Austria led the opening train of the KFNB from Floridsdorf to Deutsch-Wagram. Both locomotives soon proved incapable of handling the increased traffic and were transferred to the Stockerau line (Stockerauer Flügelbahn). After a serious accident at Versailles on the Paris – Versailles railway on May 8, 1842, the use of two-axle locomotives was banned in Austria. Austria and Moravia therefore had to be withdrawn from service. They were stored in 1846, struck off in 1849 and scrapped in 1849 or 1852 after a conversion to 2-2-2 engines with an additional carrying axle did not materialize.
