= Moravany =

Moravany may refer to places:

== Czech Republic ==
- Moravany (Brno-Country District), a municipality and village in the South Moravian Region
- Moravany (Hodonín District), a municipality and village in the South Moravian Region
- Moravany (Pardubice District), a municipality and village in the Pardubice Region
- Moravany, a village and part of Řehlovice in the Ústí nad Labem Region
- Moravany, a village and part of Ronov nad Doubravou in the Pardubice Region

== Slovakia ==
- Moravany, Michalovce District, a municipality and village in the Košice Region
- Moravany nad Váhom, a municipality and village in the Trnava Region
