= Justice Centre Leoben =

Court and prison complex in Styria, Austria

Coordinates: 47°22′39″N 15°06′19″E

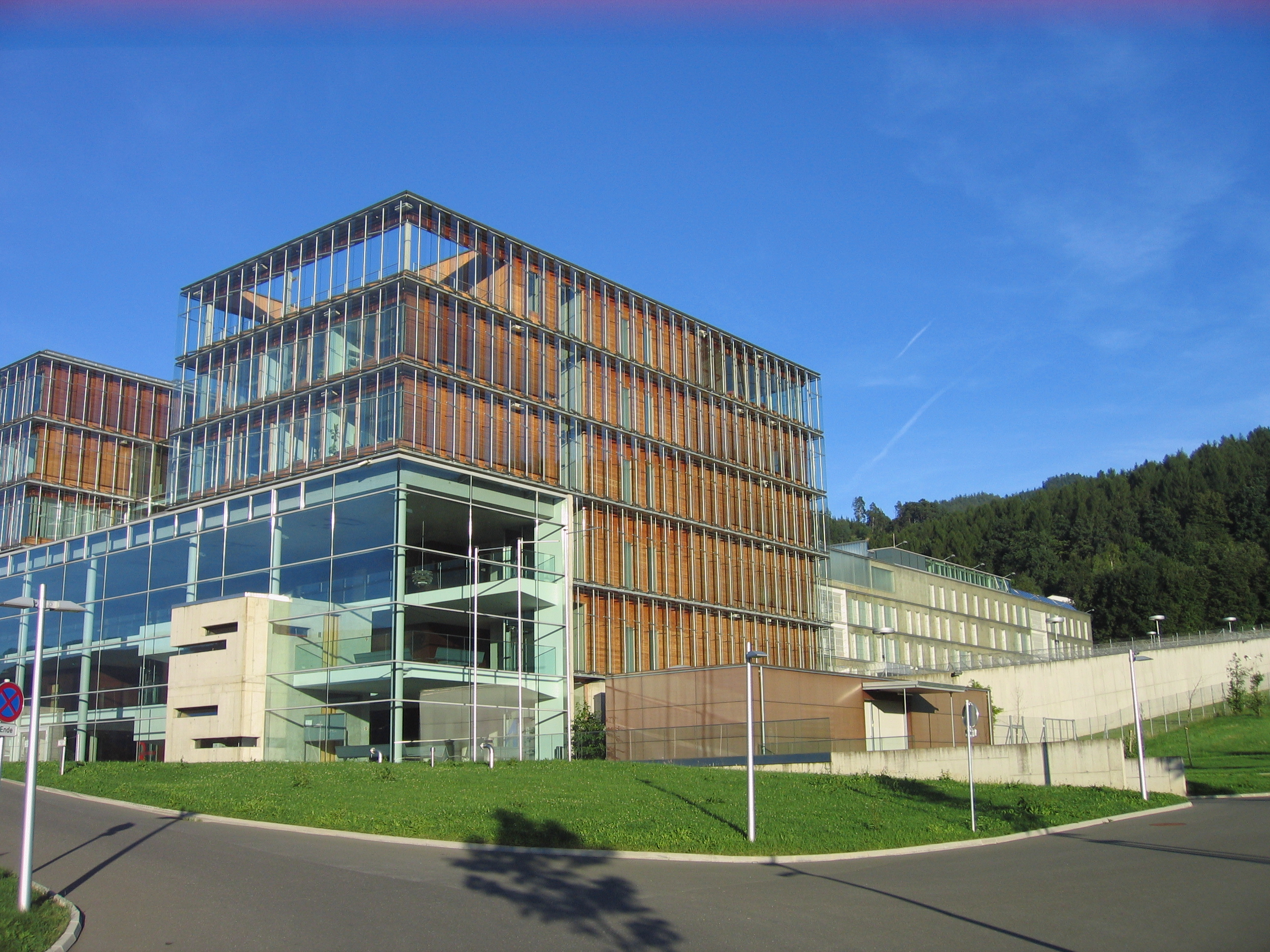
Picture of the complex. Court-Part in the front and prison-part in the background of the picture.

The Justice Centre Leoben is a court and prison complex in Leoben in Styria, Austria, which was designed by architect Josef Hohensinn and was completed in November 2004. With 205 inmates, the prison is fully booked.

There are two inscriptions on the prison's perimeter: "All human beings are born free and equal in dignity and rights," which is taken from The International Covenant on Civil and Political Rights, and "All persons deprived of their liberty shall be treated with humanity and with respect for the inherent dignity of the human person." Jim Lewis of The New York Times said that in Europe the prison's design became "more of a model — not universally accepted, but not easily ignored either" while the prison's public profile in the United States was "limited to a series of get-a-load-of-this e-mail messages and mocking blog posts (where the prison is often misidentified as a corrections center outside Chicago)."
