= Jiří Moravec =

Czech ice hockey player

- Born: February 13, 1980 (age 46) Nymburk, Czechoslovakia
- Height: 5 ft 11 in (180 cm)
- Weight: 190 lb (86 kg; 13 st 8 lb)
- Position: Defence
- Shoots: Left
- team Former teams: Free agent HC Bílí Tygři Liberec; BK Mladá Boleslav
- Playing career: 1999–present

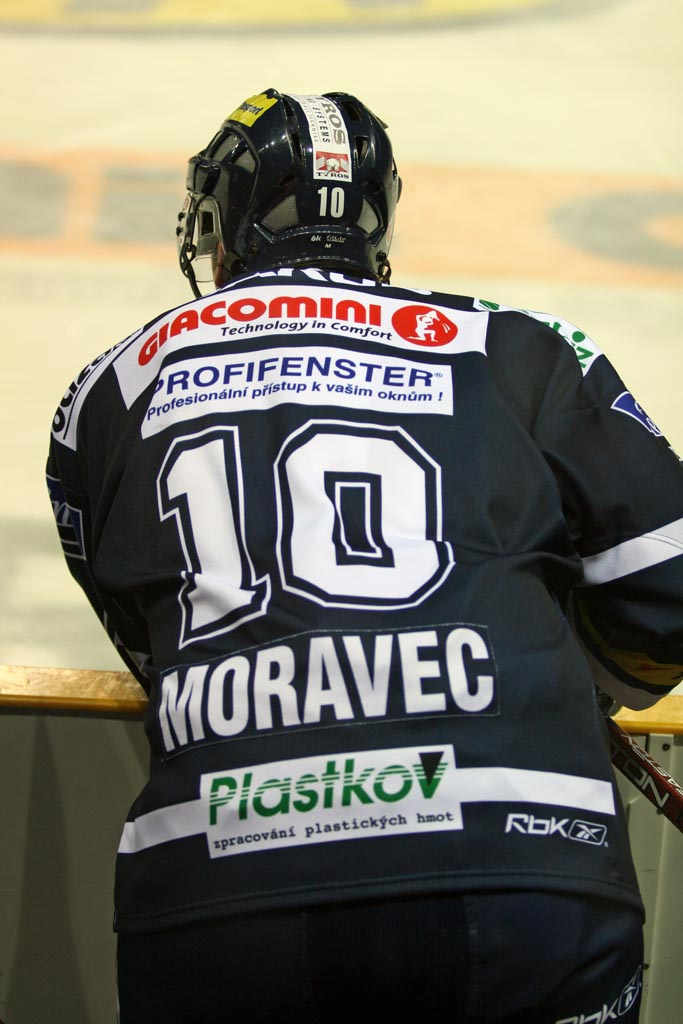
Moravec in 2007

Jiří Moravec (born 13 February 1980 in Nymburk) is a Czech professional ice hockey defenceman who is currently a free agent.

Moravec played in the Czech Extraliga for HC Bílí Tygři Liberec and BK Mladá Boleslav as well as the Czech 1.liga for HC Benátky nad Jizerou and Motor České Budějovice.

== Career statistics ==
			Regular season					Playoffs
Season	Team	League	GP	G	A	Pts	PIM	GP	G	A	Pts	PIM
1996–97	HC Liberec U20	Czech U20	1	0	1	1	—	—	—	—	—	—
1997–98	HC Liberec U20	Czech U20	33	5	12	17	—	5	0	0	0	—
1998–99	HC Liberec U20	Czech U20	40	2	14	16	—	—	—	—	—	—
1999–00	HC Liberec U20	Czech U20	30	7	5	12	67	—	—	—	—	—
1999–00	HC Liberec	Czech2	18	0	0	0	6	—	—	—	—	—
2000–01	Bili Tygri Liberec U20	Czech U20	21	2	3	5	30	—	—	—	—	—
2000–01	Bili Tygri Liberec	Czech2	28	0	2	2	24	8	0	1	1	8
2001–02	Bili Tygri Liberec	Czech2	38	6	4	10	52	12	2	2	4	6
2001–02	HC Vlci Jablonec nad Nisou	Czech3	2	0	0	0	2	—	—	—	—	—
2002–03	Bili Tygri Liberec	Czech	51	5	3	8	58	—	—	—	—	—
2003–04	Bili Tygri Liberec	Czech	43	2	6	8	34	—	—	—	—	—
2004–05	Bili Tygri Liberec	Czech	34	3	3	6	16	—	—	—	—	—
2005–06	Bili Tygri Liberec	Czech	48	6	6	12	48	2	0	0	0	0
2006–07	Bili Tygri Liberec	Czech	46	6	4	10	44	8	0	0	0	6
2007–08	Bili Tygri Liberec	Czech	47	4	3	7	60	10	0	2	2	4
2008–09	Bili Tygri Liberec	Czech	38	4	4	8	44	—	—	—	—	—
2008–09	BK Mladá Boleslav	Czech	7	0	2	2	6	—	—	—	—	—
2008–09	HC Benátky nad Jizerou	Czech2	3	1	1	2	27	—	—	—	—	—
2009–10	Bili Tygri Liberec	Czech	41	1	2	3	44	7	0	0	0	8
2009–10	HC Benátky nad Jizerou	Czech2	3	0	1	1	2	—	—	—	—	—
2010–11	Bili Tygri Liberec	Czech	49	2	5	7	26	6	0	0	0	6
2010–11	HC Benátky nad Jizerou	Czech2	1	1	0	1	4	—	—	—	—	—
2011–12	Bili Tygri Liberec	Czech	23	0	3	3	16	10	0	0	0	10
2011–12	HC Benátky nad Jizerou	Czech2	3	2	0	2	4	—	—	—	—	—
2012–13	Bili Tygri Liberec	Czech	16	0	1	1	4	—	—	—	—	—
2012–13	HC Benátky nad Jizerou	Czech2	30	4	2	6	28	—	—	—	—	—
2013–14	Motor České Budějovice	Czech2	26	2	6	8	20	—	—	—	—	—
2014–15	MsHK Zilina	Slovak	13	1	1	2	26	—	—	—	—	—
2014–15	Ferencvárosi TC	MOL Liga	26	5	6	11	63	—	—	—	—	—
2016–17	HC Vlci Jablonec nad Nisou	Czech3	30	2	12	14	99	9	0	3	3	10
2017–18	HC Vlci Jablonec nad Nisou	Czech3	36	6	9	15	44	8	1	4	5	8
Czech totals			443	33	42	75	400	51	0	4	4	38
