= Morawitz =

Morawitz is a surname. It is a Germanized variant of the Czech surname Moravec. Notable people with the surname include:

- Ferdinand Morawitz (1827–1896), Russian entomologist
- August Morawitz (1837–1897), Russian entomologist
- Paul Morawitz (1879–1936), German internist and physiologist

== See also ==
- Morawitz, a steamship that was renamed Kermoor
- Morawetz
- Moravčík
- Morávek
- Moravek
