= Josef Moravec =

Czech paleoartist and painter

Josef Moravec is a Czech paleoartist and painter currently living in the United States. He specialises in paintings of dinosaurs and has studied fossils for over 35 years to gain the necessary knowledge about them.
