= Wilfried Morawetz =

Austrian botanist

Wilfried Morawetz (born 17 November 1951 in Leoben, Austria - died 13 March 2007 in Leipzig, Germany) was an Austrian botanist. He made his doctorate 1980 at the University of Vienna.
