= Jan Morávek (1902–1984) =

Jan Morávek (1902-1984) was an important member of the Czech Resistance against the German occupation (1939-1945) in Czechoslovakia. He worked at the Ceska Zbrojovka armament factory in Prague and later in Romania, under the command of Albert Göring. Albert Göring was the younger brother of Reichmarschall Hermann Göring (second in command to Hitler).

Morávek, through Stolle, was linked to the British secret service MI6. Morávek coordinated the underground resistance in the Skoda armaments factory. Albert Göring, acting with Hromatko (a member of the Skoda Board) devised a scheme to transfer commission from sales of armaments into a Swiss bank account. Part of those funds were used to help escape several hundred Jews and other persons persecuted by the Nazis.

Receiving information from a Czech scientist that worked at Peenemünde, Morávek informed the British on 15 August 1943 about the secret development of the V1 and V2 rockets. Within 48 hours, the British diverted forces from the strategic bombing offensive for Operation Crossbow into the Operation Hydra (1943) that bombed Peenemünde. This bombing was highly successful, delaying considerably the development and utilisation of the rockets V1 and V2.

== Sources ==
- My roots continents apart pages 94–95, author Elsa Morávek Perou de Wagner, 2005 iUniverse Inc.
- London Times, article by Adam LeBor,
- The Warlord and the Renegade: The Story of Hermann and Albert Goering by James Wyllie (Hardcover - Oct 2, 2006)
