= Rosemary Dorothy Moravec =

Austrian-British musicologist

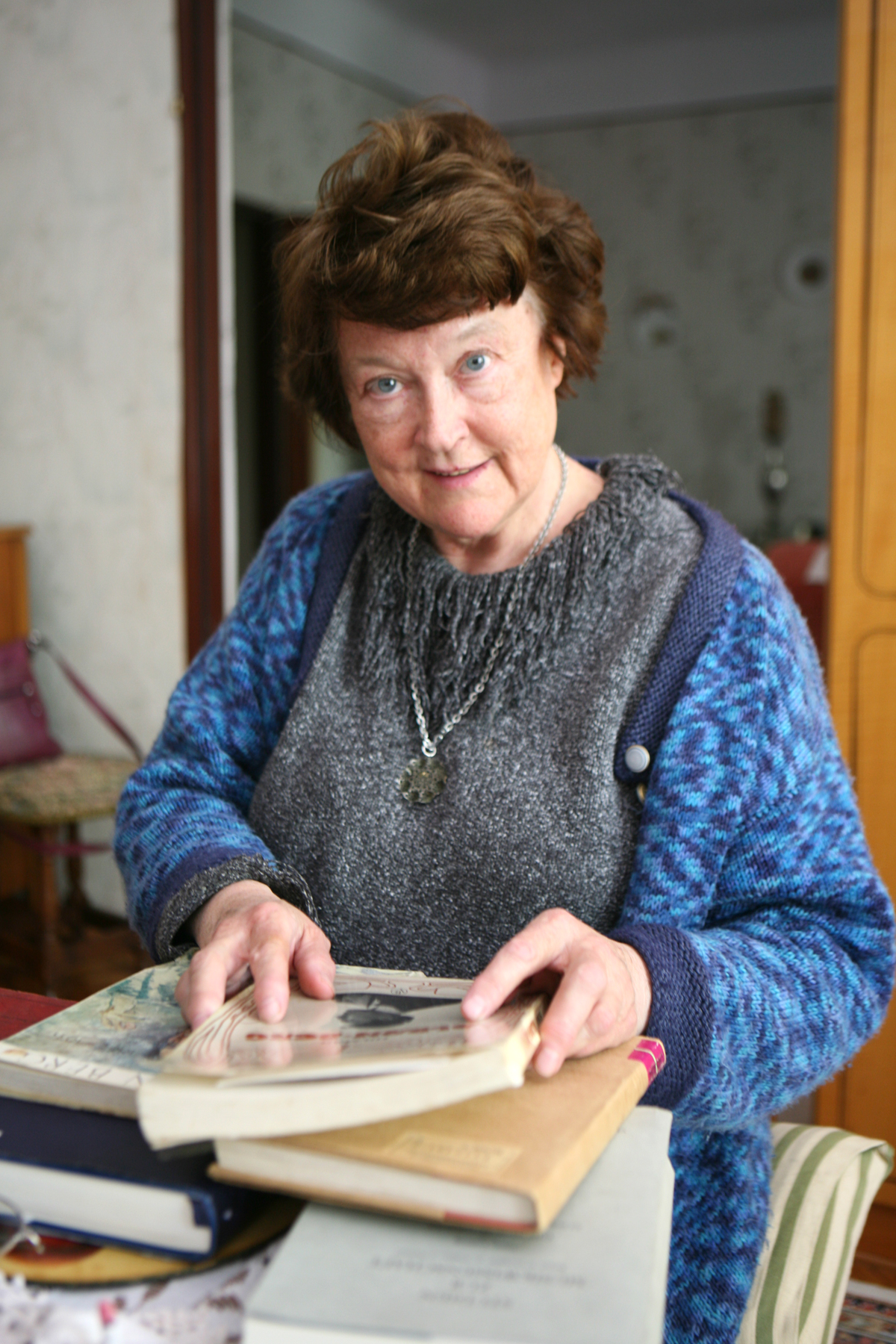

Background information
- Also known as: Rosemary Hilmar
- Born: Rosemary Dorothy Hill; 24 July 1946; Cardiff, Wales
- Died: 16 January 2013 (aged 66) Mödling, Austria
- Occupations: Musicologist, author, composer

Rosemary Dorothy Moravec, (married name, Rosemary Hilmar; 24 July 1946 - 16 January 2013) was an Austrian-British musicologist, author and composer.

== Biography ==
Rosemary Dorothy Hill was born on 24 July 1946 in Cardiff. Her father was a senior officer of the War Damage Commission and agent of the Order of the British Empire. As a child she learned Welsh in addition to English, and grew up in South Devon. She studied philosophy, Latin, French and German at Leicester University, and graduated with a Bachelor of Letters from St. Anne's College. She learned to play the violin, the guitar, the harpsichord, the piano and the harp. Most of the professors she studied under were Austrian emigrants. She worked at foreign policy talks and in 1978 she worked for a year as a lecturer at the University of Manchester. In 1979, she moved to Schoenberg House at Mödling. She studied at the New Viennese School and worked at the Austrian National Library. Her works include Mit tausend Küssen Deine Fillu: Briefe der Sängerin Marie Fillunger an Eugenie Schumann (With a Thousand Kisses, Your Fillu: Letters from the Singer Marie Fillunger to Eugenie Schumann 1875-93. She died on 16 January 2013 in Mödling.
