= Morávka =

Morávka or Moravka may refer to:

== Places ==
- Morávka Reservoir, a water reservoir and dam in the Czech Republic
- Morávka (Frýdek-Místek District), a municipality and village in the Czech Republic
- Morávka (river), a river in the Czech Republic
- Moravka, a village in the Antonovo Municipality in Bulgaria

== Other ==
- Moravka (grape), another name for the wine grape Silvaner
  - Blaufränkisch, a red wine grape that is also known as Moravka
