= Moravčík =

Moravčík (feminine Moravčíková) is a Slovak surname. Notable people with the surname include:

- Anton Moravčík (1931–1996), Slovak footballer
- Filip Moravčík (born 1991), Slovak footballer
- Jozef Moravčík (born 1945), Slovak diplomat
- Ľubomír Moravčík (born 1965), Slovak footballer
- Martina Moravčíková (born 1988), Czech swimmer
- Michal Moravčík (born 1994), Czech ice hockey player
- Soňa Moravčíková (born 1999), Slovak alpine skier
- Zuzana Moravčíková (born 1980), Slovak ice hockey player
- Zuzana Moravčíková (born 1956), Slovak track athlete

== See also ==
- Moravec (surname)
- Morávek
- Moravek
- Moravetz
- Morawetz
- Morawitz
