= Moravice =

Moravice may refer to:

== Croatia ==
- Moravice, Croatia, a village in the Primorje-Gorski Kotar County
- Brod Moravice, a municipality in the Primorje-Gorski Kotar County

== Czech Republic ==
- Moravice, Czech Republic, a municipality and village in the Moravian-Silesian Region
- Moravice (river), a tributary river of the Opava
- Dolní Moravice, a municipality and village in the Moravian-Silesian Region

== See also ==
- Moravica (disambiguation)
