= Kateřinice =

Kateřinice may refer to places in the Czech Republic:

- Kateřinice (Nový Jičín District), a municipality and village in the Moravian-Silesian Region
- Kateřinice (Vsetín District), a municipality and village in the Zlín Region
