= Podolí =

Podolí may refer to places in the Czech Republic:

- Podolí (Brno-Country District), a municipality and village in the South Moravian Region
- Podolí (Přerov District), a municipality and village in the Olomouc Region
- Podolí (Uherské Hradiště District), a municipality and village in the Zlín Region
- Podolí (Vsetín District), a municipality and village in the Zlín Region
- Podolí (Žďár nad Sázavou District), a municipality and village in the Vysočina Region
- Podolí (Prague), a district of Prague
- Podolí, a village and part of Borač in the South Moravian Region
- Podolí, a village and part of Bouzov in the Olomouc Region
- Podolí, a village and part of Jankov (Benešov District) in the Central Bohemian Region
- Podolí, a village and part of Kolinec in the Plzeň Region
- Podolí, a village and part of Letovice in the South Moravian Region
- Podolí, a village and part of Mnichovo Hradiště in the Central Bohemian Region
- Podolí, a village and part of Mohelnice in the Olomouc Region
- Podolí, a hamlet and part of Olbramovice (Benešov District) in the Central Bohemian Region
- Podolí, a village and part of Prachatice in the South Bohemian Region
- Podolí, a village and part of Radomyšl in the South Bohemian Region
- Podolí, a village and part of Ratibořské Hory in the South Bohemian Region
- Podolí, a village and part of Rožďalovice in the Central Bohemian Region
- Podolí, a village and part of Vojkov in the Central Bohemian Region
- Podolí I, a municipality and village in the South Bohemian Region
- Podolí II, a village and part of Předotice in the South Bohemian Region
- Bílé Podolí, a municipality and village in the Central Bohemian Region
- Telč-Podolí, a part of Telč in the South Bohemian Region

== See also ==
- Podolia, a historic region
