= Leskovec (Vsetín District) =

- Municipality
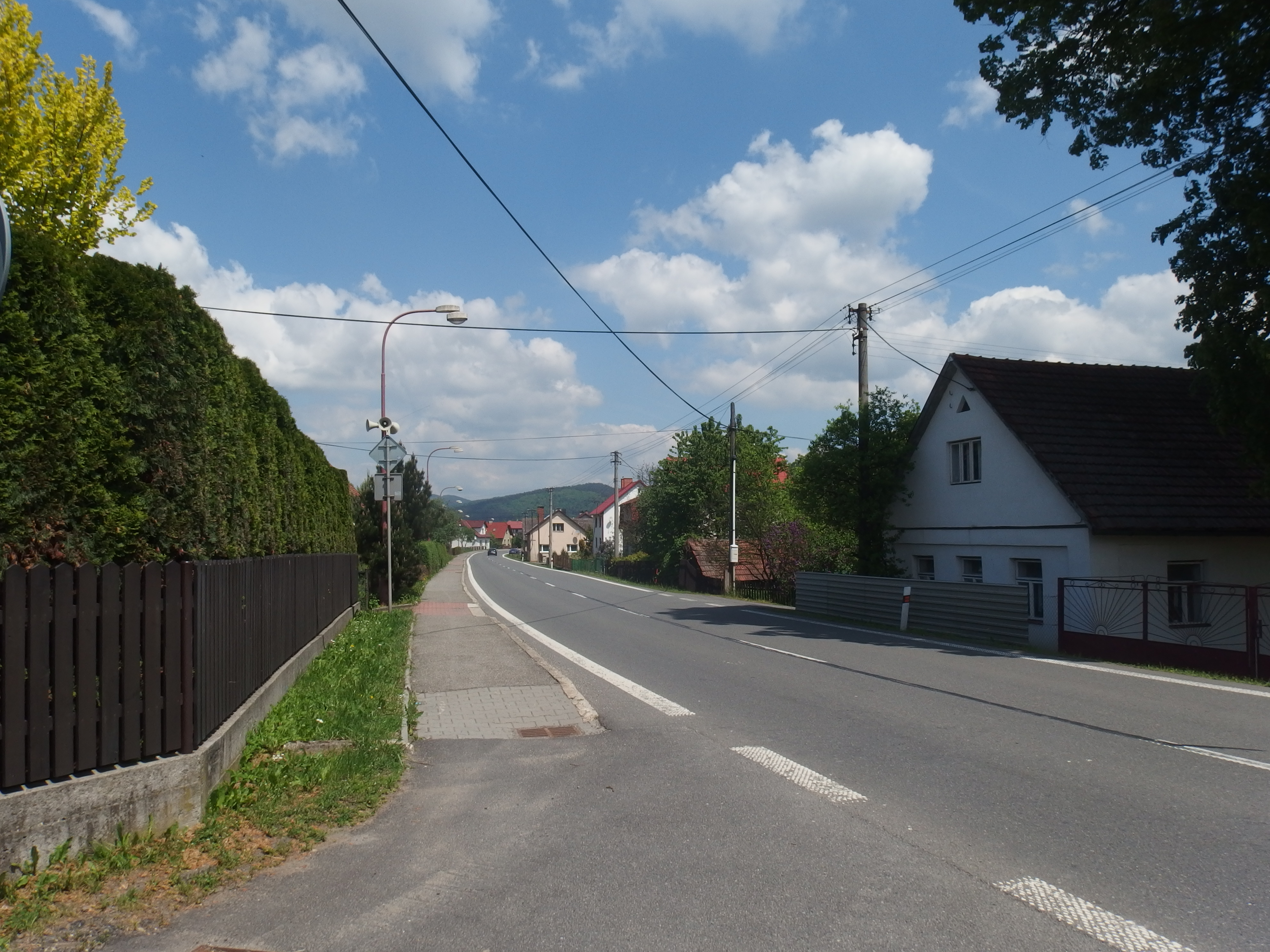
- Main street

- Flag Coat of arms

- Location in the Czech Republic
- Coordinates: 49°17′3″N 17°59′56″E
- Country: Czech Republic
- Region: Zlín
- District: Vsetín
- First mentioned: 1361

Area
  - Total: 9.86 km^{2} (3.81 sq mi)
- Elevation: 365 m (1,198 ft)

Population (2026-01-01)
  - Total: 676
  - Density: 68.6/km^{2} (178/sq mi)
- Time zone: UTC+1 (CET)
  - Summer (DST): UTC+2 (CEST)
- Postal code: 756 11
- Website: www.leskovec.cz

Leskovec is a municipality and village in Vsetín District in the Zlín Region of the Czech Republic. It has about 700 inhabitants.

Leskovec lies approximately 6 kilometres (4 mi) south of Vsetín, 26 km (16 mi) east of Zlín, and 273 km (170 mi) east of Prague.

== Demographics ==
Historical population
Year	Pop.	±%
1869	539	—
1880	513	−4.8%
1890	494	−3.7%
1900	492	−0.4%
1910	582	+18.3%
1921	573	−1.5%
1930	592	+3.3%
1950	647	+9.3%
1961	743	+14.8%
1970	707	−4.8%
1980	679	−4.0%
1991	639	−5.9%
2001	660	+3.3%
2011	656	−0.6%
2021	633	−3.5%
Source: Censuses
