= Růžďka =

- Municipality
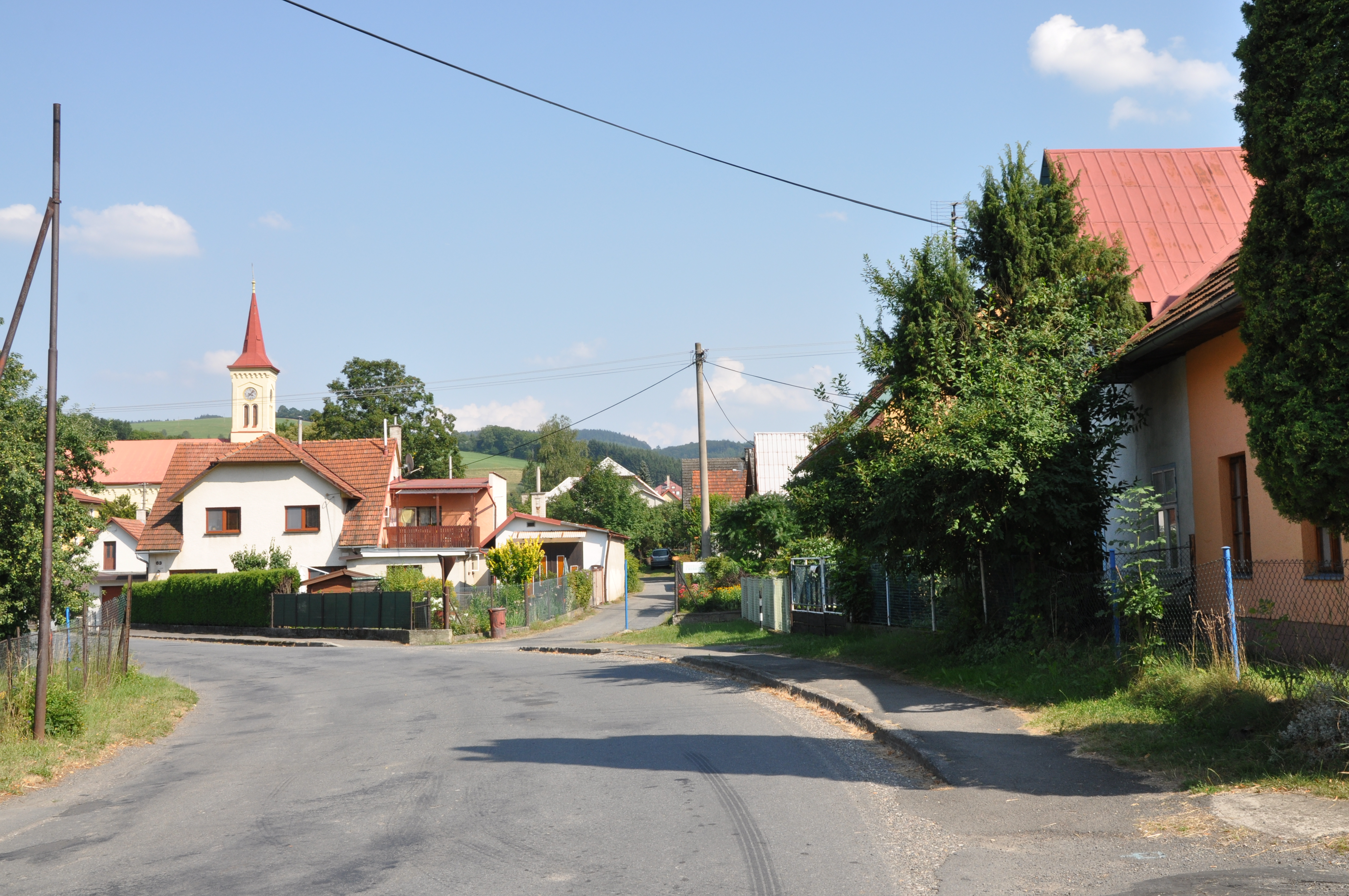
- A street in Růžďka

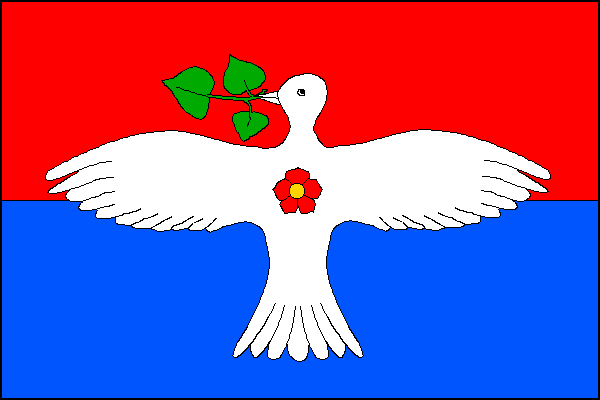
- Flag Coat of arms

- Location in the Czech Republic
- Coordinates: 49°23′38″N 17°59′44″E
- Country: Czech Republic
- Region: Zlín
- District: Vsetín
- First mentioned: 1505

Area
  - Total: 18.54 km^{2} (7.16 sq mi)
- Elevation: 376 m (1,234 ft)

Population (2026-01-01)
  - Total: 887
  - Density: 47.8/km^{2} (124/sq mi)
- Time zone: UTC+1 (CET)
  - Summer (DST): UTC+2 (CEST)
- Postal code: 756 25
- Website: www.ruzdka.cz

Růžďka is a municipality and village in Vsetín District in the Zlín Region of the Czech Republic. It has about 900 inhabitants.

Růžďka lies approximately 7 kilometres (4 mi) north of Vsetín, 30 km (19 mi) north-east of Zlín, and 268 km (167 mi) east of Prague.

== Demographics ==
Historical population
Year	Pop.	±%
1869	1,669	—
1880	1,574	−5.7%
1890	1,606	+2.0%
1900	1,625	+1.2%
1910	1,552	−4.5%
1921	1,397	−10.0%
1930	1,510	+8.1%
1950	1,498	−0.8%
1961	1,477	−1.4%
1970	1,263	−14.5%
1980	1,053	−16.6%
1991	948	−10.0%
2001	882	−7.0%
2011	913	+3.5%
2021	892	−2.3%
Source: Censuses
