= Hošťálková =

- Municipality
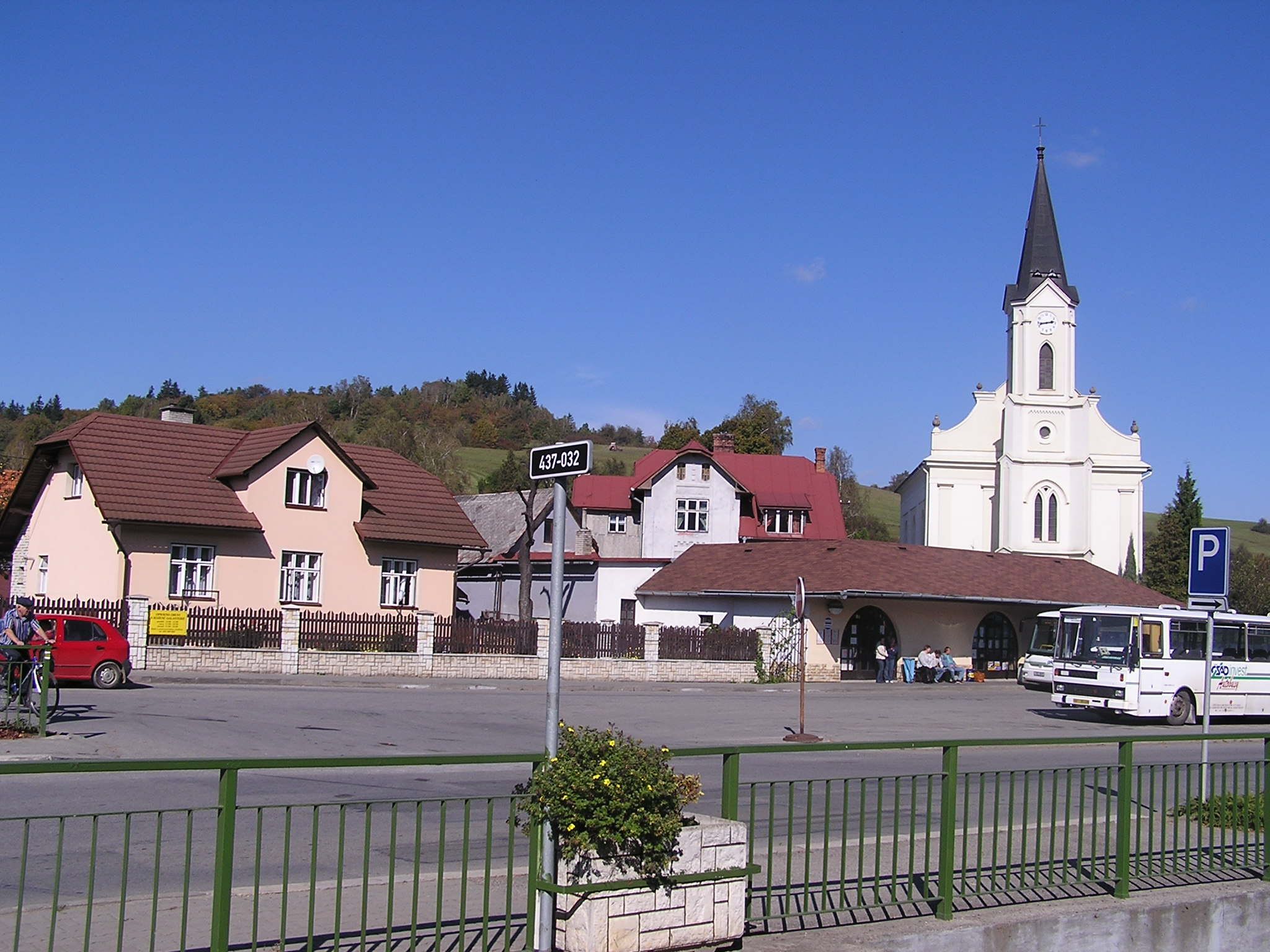
- Centre of Hošťálková

- Flag Coat of arms

- Location in the Czech Republic
- Coordinates: 49°21′17″N 17°52′10″E
- Country: Czech Republic
- Region: Zlín
- District: Vsetín
- First mentioned: 1505

Area
  - Total: 26.90 km^{2} (10.39 sq mi)
- Elevation: 370 m (1,210 ft)

Population (2026-01-01)
  - Total: 2,289
  - Density: 85.09/km^{2} (220.4/sq mi)
- Time zone: UTC+1 (CET)
  - Summer (DST): UTC+2 (CEST)
- Postal code: 756 22
- Website: hostalkova.cz

Hošťálková is a municipality and village in Vsetín District in the Zlín Region of the Czech Republic. It has about 2,300 inhabitants.

== Geography ==
Hošťálková is located about 9 kilometres (6 mi) west of Vsetín and 20 km (12 mi) northeast of Zlín. It lies in the Hostýn-Vsetín Mountains. The highest point is the mountain Maruška at 664 m (2,178 ft) above sea level. The Ratibořka Stream originates here and flows across the municipality.

== History ==
The first written mention of Hošťálková is from 1505, but the village was probably founded in the 14th century. Until 1678, Hošťálková belonged to the Vsetín estate. From 1678, it was a separate estate.

== Demographics ==
Historical population

Year	Pop.	±%
1869	1,802	—
1880	1,878	+4.2%
1890	1,877	−0.1%
1900	1,805	−3.8%
1910	1,671	−7.4%

Year	Pop.	±%
1921	1,747	+4.5%
1930	1,915	+9.6%
1950	1,818	−5.1%
1961	2,023	+11.3%
1970	1,903	−5.9%

Year	Pop.	±%
1980	1,991	+4.6%
1991	2,009	+0.9%
2001	2,032	+1.1%
2011	2,092	+3.0%
2021	2,176	+4.0%

Source: Censuses

== Transport ==
There are no railways or major roads passing through the municipality.

== Sights ==
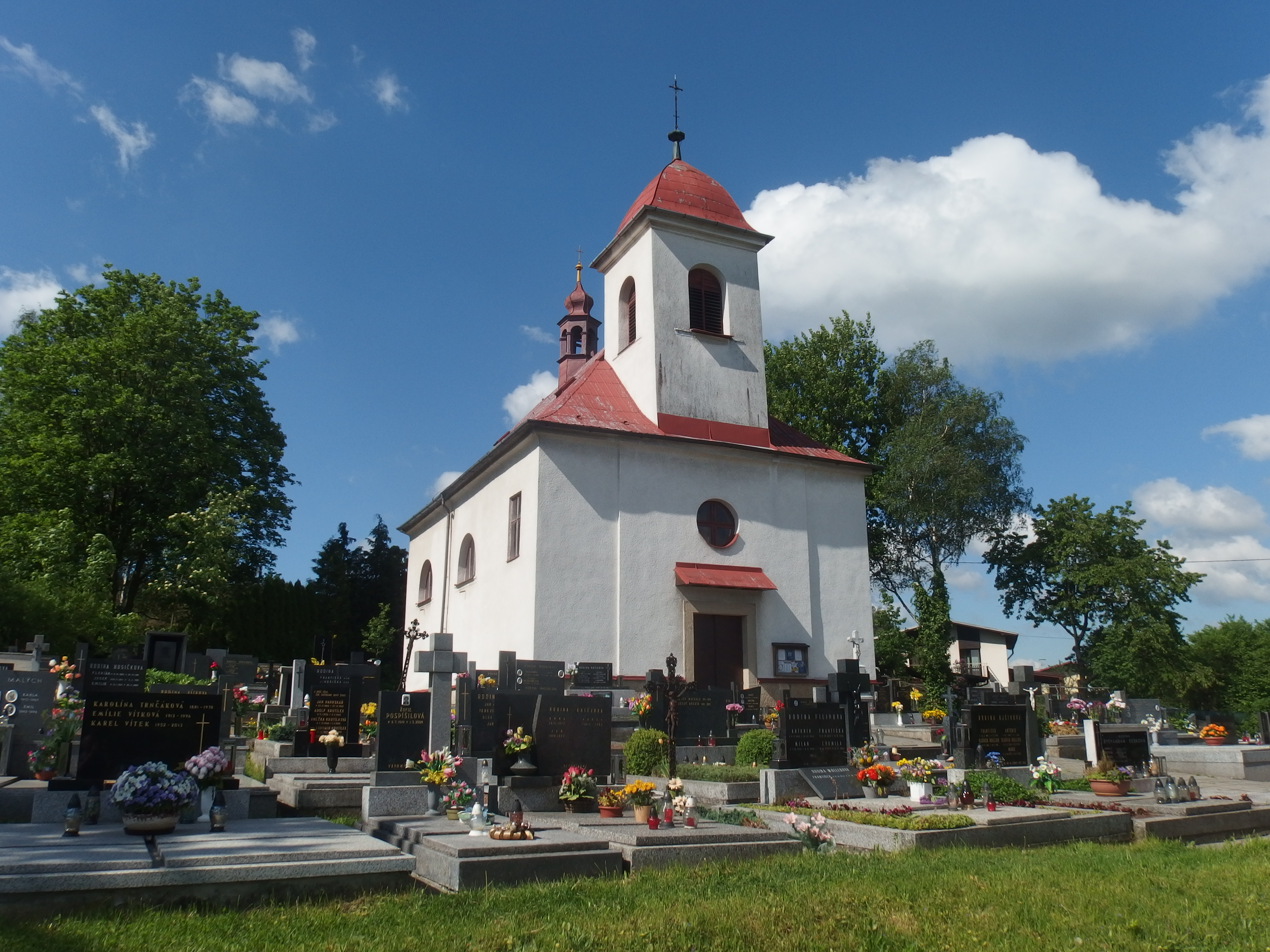
Church of the Exaltation of the Holy Cross

Among the main landmarks of Hošťálková are the two churches. The Church of the Exaltation of the Holy Cros is a Catholic church, built in 1797. The Evangelical church was built in 1829–1831. The tower was added in the second half of the 19th century.

A notable building is the Hošťálková Castle. It was built in the Empire style in the 1840s. Since 2003, it has been a property of the municipality.
