= Vsetín District =

Vsetín District Okres Vsetín
- District
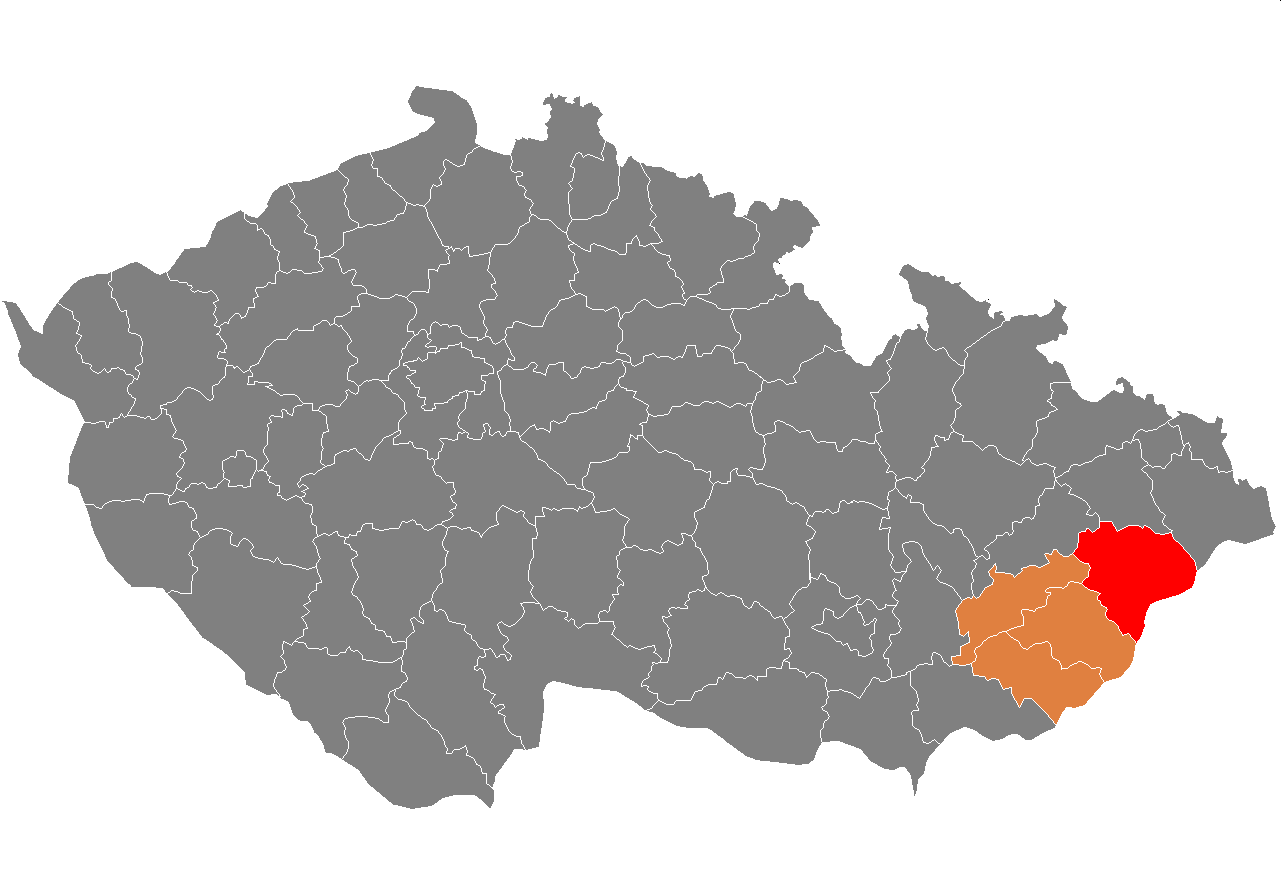
- Location in the Zlín Region within the Czech Republic
- Coordinates: 49°24′N 18°3′E
- Country: Czech Republic
- Region: Zlín
- Capital: Vsetín

Area
  - Total: 1,131.07 km^{2} (436.71 sq mi)

Population (2026)
  - Total: 141,322
  - Density: 124.945/km^{2} (323.607/sq mi)
- Time zone: UTC+1 (CET)
  - Summer (DST): UTC+2 (CEST)
- Municipalities: 59
- * Towns: 6
- * Market towns: 1

Vsetín District (Czech: okres Vsetín) is a district in the Zlín Region of the Czech Republic. Its capital is the town of Vsetín.

== Administrative division ==
Vsetín District is divided into three administrative districts of municipalities with extended competence: Vsetín, Rožnov pod Radhoštěm and Valašské Meziříčí.

=== List of municipalities ===
Towns are marked in bold and market towns in italics:

Branky - Bystřička - Choryně - Dolní Bečva - Francova Lhota - Halenkov - Horní Bečva - Horní Lideč - Hošťálková - Hovězí - Huslenky - Hutisko-Solanec - Jablůnka - Janová - Jarcová - Karolinka - Kateřinice - Kelč - Kladeruby - Krhová - Kunovice - Lačnov - Leskovec - Lešná - Lhota u Vsetína - Lidečko - Liptál - Loučka - Lužná - Malá Bystřice - Mikulůvka - Nový Hrozenkov - Oznice - Podolí - Police - Poličná - Pozděchov - Prlov - Prostřední Bečva - Pržno - Ratiboř - Rožnov pod Radhoštěm - Růžďka - Seninka - Střelná - Střítež nad Bečvou - Ústí - Valašská Bystřice - Valašská Polanka - Valašská Senice - Valašské Meziříčí - Velká Lhota - Velké Karlovice - Vidče - Vigantice - Vsetín - Zašová - Zděchov - Zubří

== Geography ==
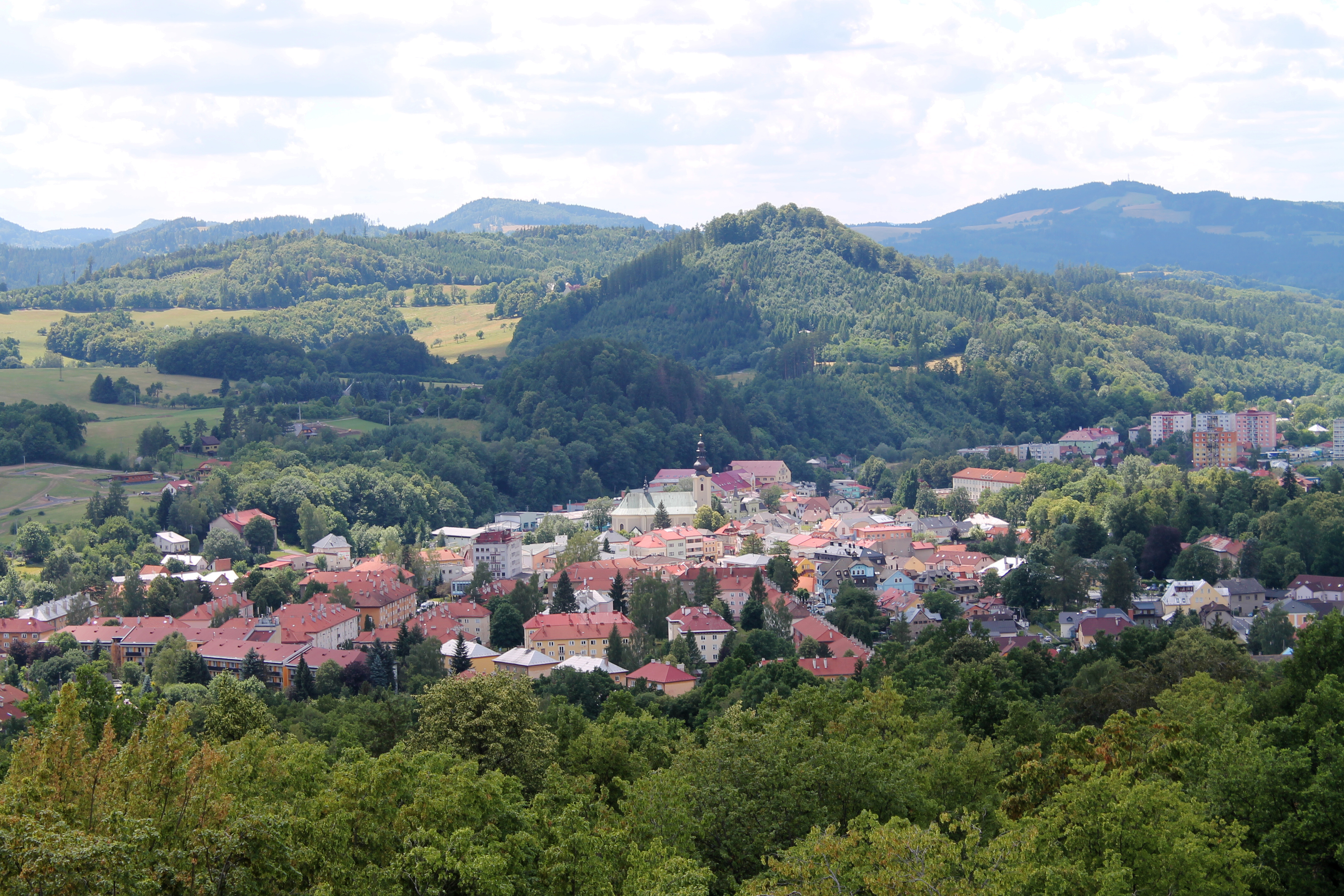
Rožnov pod Radhoštěm and surrounding landscape

Vsetín District borders Slovakia in the southeast. The terrain is hilly to mountainous and except in the northwest, most of the landscape is forested. The territory extends into seven geomorphological mesoregions: Hostýn-Vsetín Mountains (most of the territory), Maple Mountains (southeast), Vizovice Highlands (southwest), Rožnov Furrow (a strip in the north), Moravian-Silesian Beskids (north), Moravian-Silesian Foothills (northwest), and White Carpathians (a small part in the south). The highest point of the district and of the entire Zlín Region is the mountain Čertův mlýn in Prostřední Bečva with an elevation of 1,206 m (3,957 ft). The lowest point of the district is the river bed of the Bečva in Kelč at 263 m (863 ft).

From the total district area of 1,131.1 km^{2} (436.7 sq mi), agricultural land occupies 403.0 km^{2} (155.6 sq mi), forests occupy 620.9 km^{2} (239.7 sq mi), and water area occupies 11.1 km^{2} (4.3 sq mi). Forests cover 54.9% of the district's area.

The most important rivers of the district are the Vsetínská Bečva and Rožnovská Bečva, which join in Valašské Meziříčí and create the Bečva River. The area is poor in bodies of water. The only notable bodies of water is are the Karolinka and Bystřička reservoirs.

The eastern half of the district is protected within the Beskydy Protected Landscape Area.

== Demographics ==
Historical population

| Year | Pop. | ±% |
|---|---|---|
| 1869 | 83,073 | — |
| 1880 | 87,465 | +5.3% |
| 1890 | 90,193 | +3.1% |
| 1900 | 94,394 | +4.7% |
| 1910 | 98,228 | +4.1% |

| Year | Pop. | ±% |
|---|---|---|
| 1921 | 95,071 | −3.2% |
| 1930 | 101,633 | +6.9% |
| 1950 | 105,693 | +4.0% |
| 1961 | 121,144 | +14.6% |
| 1970 | 130,748 | +7.9% |

| Year | Pop. | ±% |
|---|---|---|
| 1980 | 143,428 | +9.7% |
| 1991 | 146,898 | +2.4% |
| 2001 | 147,064 | +0.1% |
| 2011 | 142,420 | −3.2% |
| 2021 | 137,540 | −3.4% |

Source: Censuses

=== Most populous municipalities ===
| Name | Population | Area (km^{2}) |
|---|---|---|
| Vsetín | 24,974 | 58 |
| Valašské Meziříčí | 22,568 | 35 |
| Rožnov pod Radhoštěm | 15,916 | 39 |
| Zubří | 5,603 | 28 |
| Zašová | 3,082 | 23 |
| Kelč | 2,700 | 28 |
| Nový Hrozenkov | 2,480 | 43 |
| Horní Bečva | 2,435 | 42 |
| Halenkov | 2,354 | 42 |
| Velké Karlovice | 2,342 | 81 |

== Economy ==
The largest employers with headquarters in Vsetín District and at least 500 employees are:

| Economic entity | Location | Number of employees | Main activity |
|---|---|---|---|
| ON Semiconductor Czech Republic | Rožnov pod Radhoštěm | 1,500–1,999 | Manufacture of electronic components |
| Kayaku Safety Systems Europe | Vsetín | 1,000–1,499 | Manufacture of explosives |
| Vsetín Hospital | Vsetín | 1,000–1,499 | Health care |
| ROBE lighting | Rožnov pod Radhoštěm | 500–999 | Manufacture of electronic components |
| AGEL Hospital Valašské Meziříčí | Valašské Meziříčí | 500–999 | Health care |
| DEZA | Valašské Meziříčí | 500–999 | Chemical industry |
| MP Krásno | Valašské Meziříčí | 500–999 | Food industry |
| PWO Czech Republic | Valašské Meziříčí | 500–999 | Machining |
| Austin Detonator | Vsetín | 500–999 | Manufacture of detonators |
| Jednota, spotřební družstvo ve Vsetíně | Vsetín | 500–999 | Retail sale |
| Servis Climax | Vsetín | 500–999 | Manufacture of window blinds |
| Sociální služby Vsetín | Vsetín | 500–999 | Residential care activities |
| Stín Kovo | Vsetín | 500–999 | Manufacture of window blinds |

== Transport ==
There are no motorways passing through the district. The most important road is the I/35 (part of the European route E442 from Olomouc to the Czech–Slovak border.

== Sights ==
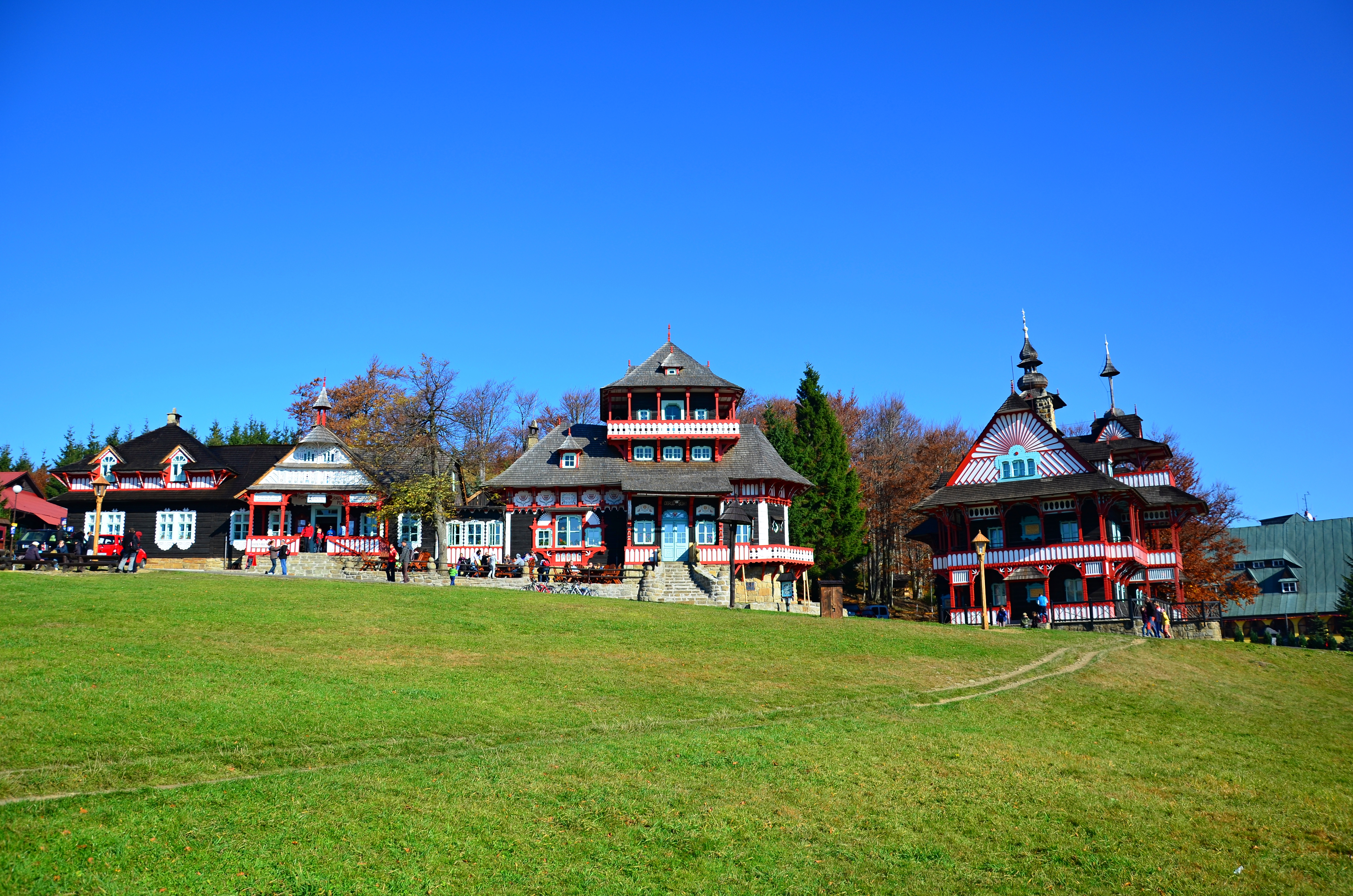
Pustevny

The most important monuments in the district, protected as national cultural monuments, are:

- Pustevny area
- Wallachian Open Air Museum
- Evangelical church in Velká Lhota
- Advocatus' residence in Velké Karlovice

The best-preserved settlements, protected as monument zones, are:

- Kelč
- Valašské Meziříčí
- Huslenky-Kychová
- Velké Karlovice-Podťaté
- Zděchov

The most visited tourist destination is the Wallachian Open Air Museum in Rožnov pod Radhoštěm.
