= Choryně =

- Municipality
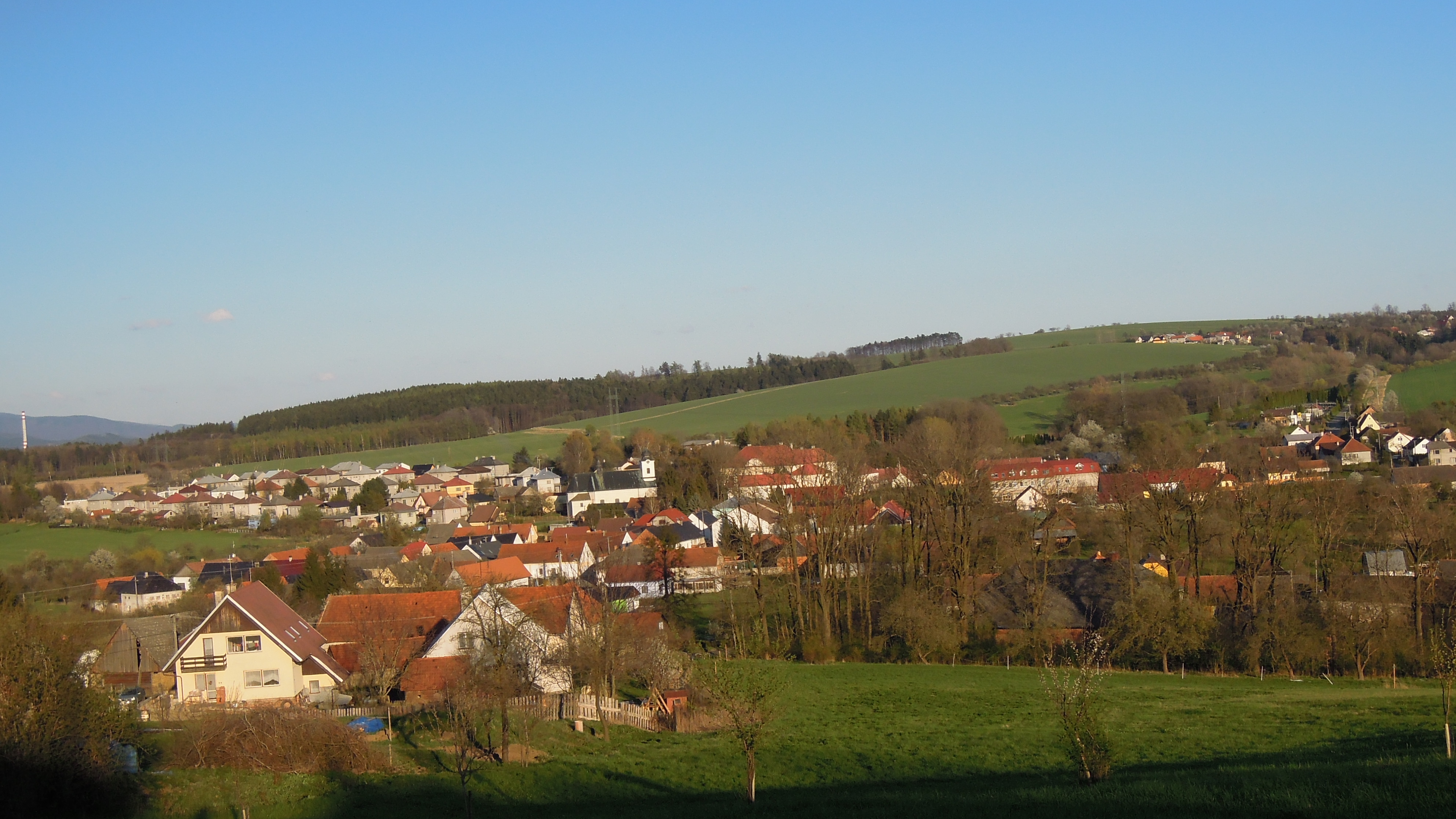
- General view

- Flag Coat of arms

- Location in the Czech Republic
- Coordinates: 49°29′45″N 17°53′55″E
- Country: Czech Republic
- Region: Zlín
- District: Vsetín
- First mentioned: 1131

Area
  - Total: 9.11 km^{2} (3.52 sq mi)
- Elevation: 274 m (899 ft)

Population (2026-01-01)
  - Total: 752
  - Density: 82.5/km^{2} (214/sq mi)
- Time zone: UTC+1 (CET)
  - Summer (DST): UTC+2 (CEST)
- Postal code: 756 42
- Website: www.obec-choryne.cz

Choryně is a municipality and village in Vsetín District in the Zlín Region of the Czech Republic. It has about 800 inhabitants.

Choryně lies approximately 19 kilometres (12 mi) north of Vsetín, 35 km (22 mi) north-east of Zlín, and 259 km (161 mi) east of Prague.

== Demographics ==
Historical population
Year	Pop.	±%
1869	511	—
1880	547	+7.0%
1890	605	+10.6%
1900	614	+1.5%
1910	640	+4.2%
1921	626	−2.2%
1930	731	+16.8%
1950	716	−2.1%
1961	904	+26.3%
1970	811	−10.3%
1980	805	−0.7%
1991	748	−7.1%
2001	739	−1.2%
2011	738	−0.1%
2021	739	+0.1%
Source: Censuses
