= Vigantice =

- Municipality
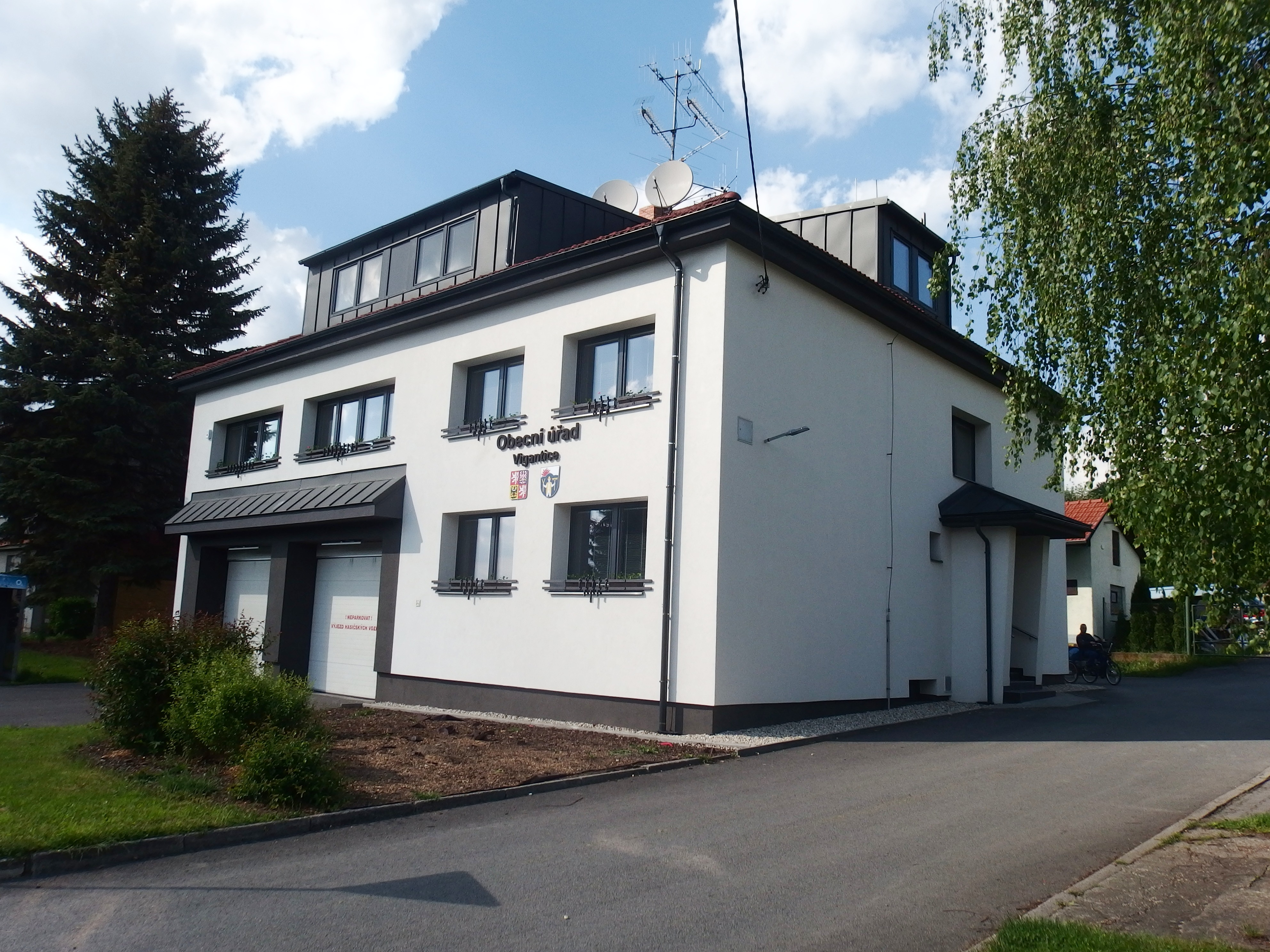
- Municipal office

- Flag Coat of arms

- Location in the Czech Republic
- Coordinates: 49°26′38″N 18°11′3″E
- Country: Czech Republic
- Region: Zlín
- District: Vsetín
- First mentioned: 1411

Area
  - Total: 7.63 km^{2} (2.95 sq mi)
- Elevation: 435 m (1,427 ft)

Population (2026-01-01)
  - Total: 1,078
  - Density: 141/km^{2} (366/sq mi)
- Time zone: UTC+1 (CET)
  - Summer (DST): UTC+2 (CEST)
- Postal code: 756 61
- Website: www.vigantice.cz

Vigantice is a municipality and village in Vsetín District in the Zlín Region of the Czech Republic. It has about 1,100 inhabitants.

== Demographics ==
Historical population
Year	Pop.	±%
1869	669	—
1880	692	+3.4%
1890	686	−0.9%
1900	709	+3.4%
1910	698	−1.6%
1921	654	−6.3%
1930	749	+14.5%
1950	640	−14.6%
1961	775	+21.1%
1970	834	+7.6%
1980	826	−1.0%
1991	859	+4.0%
2001	874	+1.7%
2011	931	+6.5%
2021	1,061	+14.0%
Source: Censuses

== Notable people ==
- Radim Kučera (born 1974), footballer and football manager
- Milan Baroš (born 1981), footballer

== Twin towns – sister cities ==
Vigantice is twinned with:

- Ludrová, Slovakia
