= Pozděchov =

- Municipality
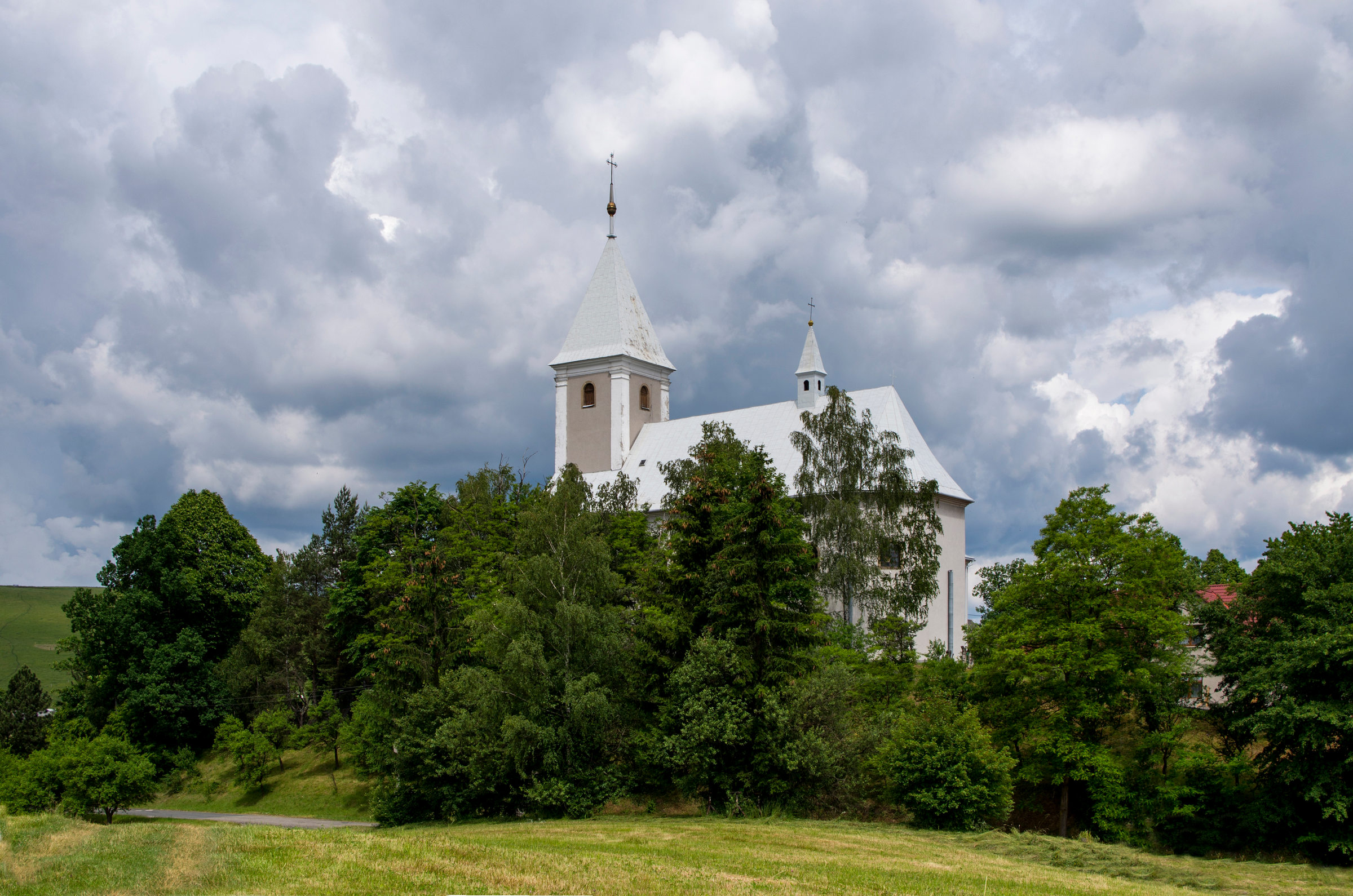
- Church of Saint George

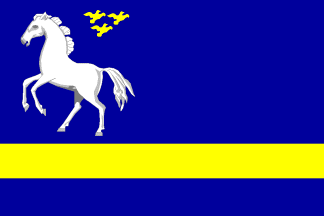
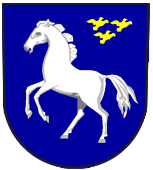
- Flag Coat of arms

- Location in the Czech Republic
- Coordinates: 49°14′0″N 17°57′20″E
- Country: Czech Republic
- Region: Zlín
- District: Vsetín
- First mentioned: 1361

Area
  - Total: 13.46 km^{2} (5.20 sq mi)
- Elevation: 490 m (1,610 ft)

Population (2026-01-01)
  - Total: 582
  - Density: 43.2/km^{2} (112/sq mi)
- Time zone: UTC+1 (CET)
  - Summer (DST): UTC+2 (CEST)
- Postal code: 756 11
- Website: www.obecpozdechov.cz

Pozděchov is a municipality and village in Vsetín District in the Zlín Region of the Czech Republic. It has about 600 inhabitants.

Pozděchov lies approximately 13 kilometres (8 mi) south of Vsetín, 21 km (13 mi) east of Zlín, and 272 km (169 mi) east of Prague.

== Demographics ==
Historical population
Year	Pop.	±%
1869	558	—
1880	641	+14.9%
1890	625	−2.5%
1900	625	+0.0%
1910	637	+1.9%
1921	665	+4.4%
1930	669	+0.6%
1950	687	+2.7%
1961	786	+14.4%
1970	715	−9.0%
1980	674	−5.7%
1991	570	−15.4%
2001	586	+2.8%
2011	534	−8.9%
2021	559	+4.7%
Source: Censuses
