= Loučka (Vsetín District) =

- Municipality
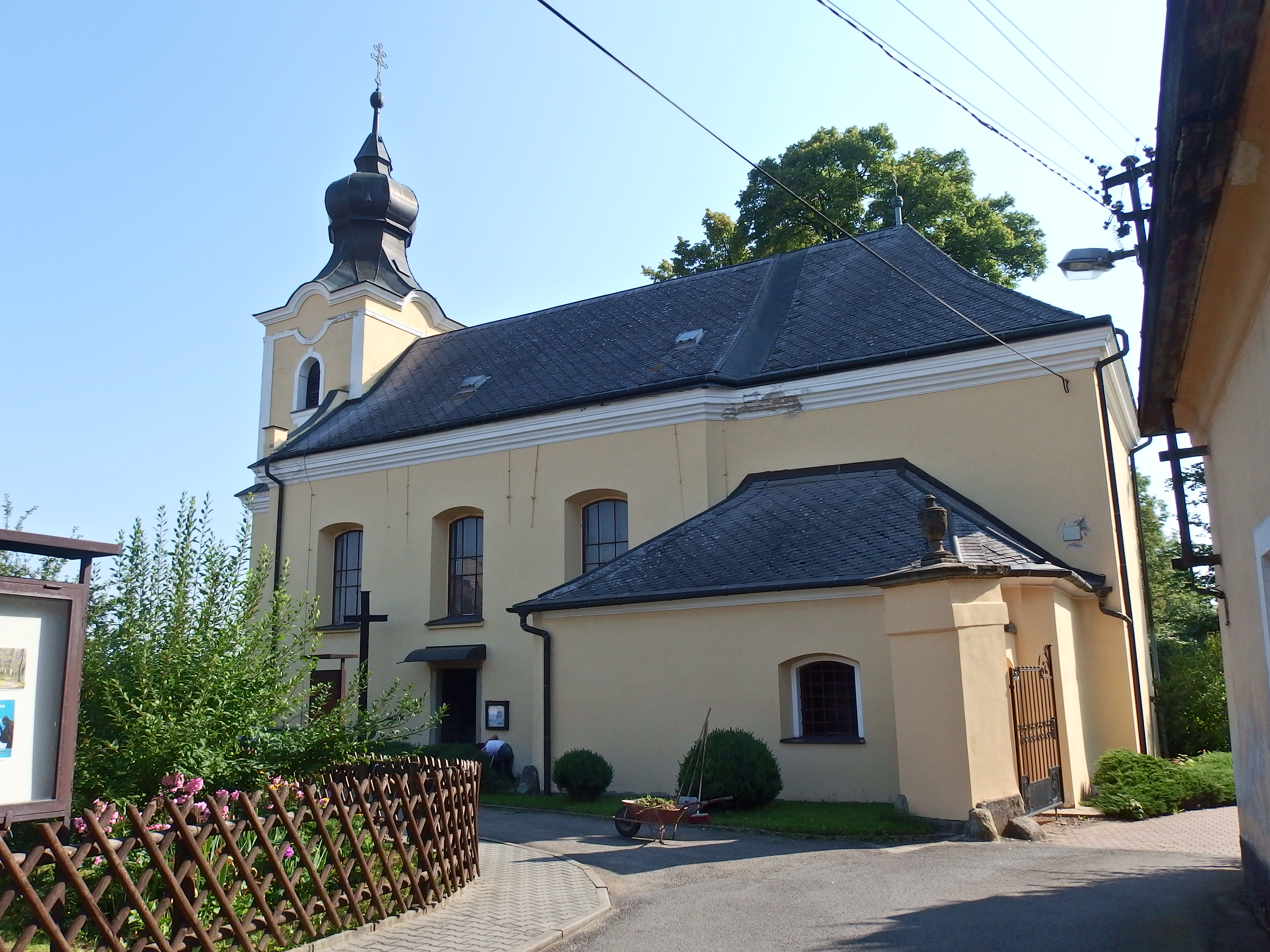
- Church of the Good Shepherd

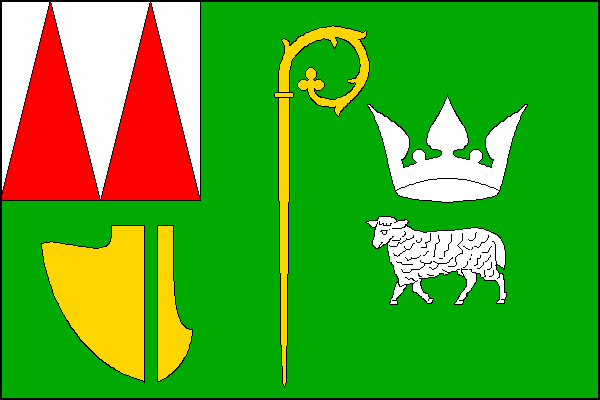
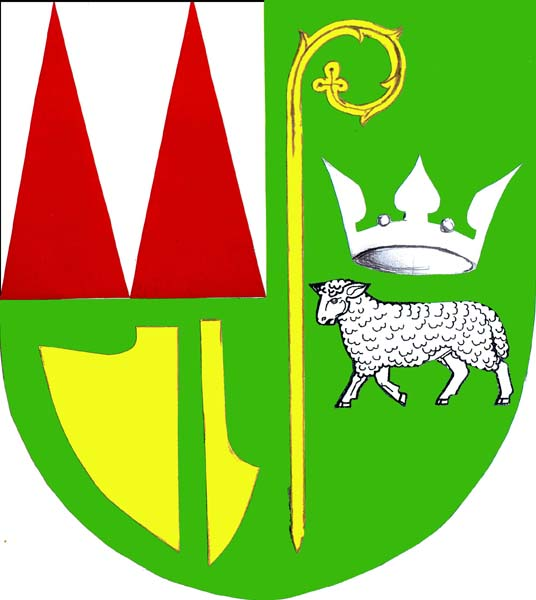
- Flag Coat of arms

- Location in the Czech Republic
- Coordinates: 49°26′19″N 17°49′58″E
- Country: Czech Republic
- Region: Zlín
- District: Vsetín
- First mentioned: 1307

Area
  - Total: 6.89 km^{2} (2.66 sq mi)
- Elevation: 410 m (1,350 ft)

Population (2026-01-01)
  - Total: 768
  - Density: 111/km^{2} (289/sq mi)
- Time zone: UTC+1 (CET)
  - Summer (DST): UTC+2 (CEST)
- Postal code: 756 44
- Website: www.obecloucka.cz

Loučka (German: Lauczka) is a municipality and village in Vsetín District in the Zlín Region of the Czech Republic. It has about 800 inhabitants.

Loučka lies approximately 17 kilometres (11 mi) north-west of Vsetín, 26 km (16 mi) north-east of Zlín, and 256 km (159 mi) east of Prague.

== Administrative division ==
Loučka consists of five municipal parts (in brackets population according to the 2021 census):

- Loučka (665)
- Lázy (127)

== Demographics ==
Historical population
Year	Pop.	±%
1869	753	—
1880	775	+2.9%
1890	805	+3.9%
1900	822	+2.1%
1910	872	+6.1%
1921	840	−3.7%
1930	854	+1.7%
1950	955	+11.8%
1961	980	+2.6%
1970	864	−11.8%
1980	820	−5.1%
1991	750	−8.5%
2001	743	−0.9%
2011	730	−1.7%
2021	792	+8.5%
Source: Censuses
