= Mikulůvka =

- Municipality
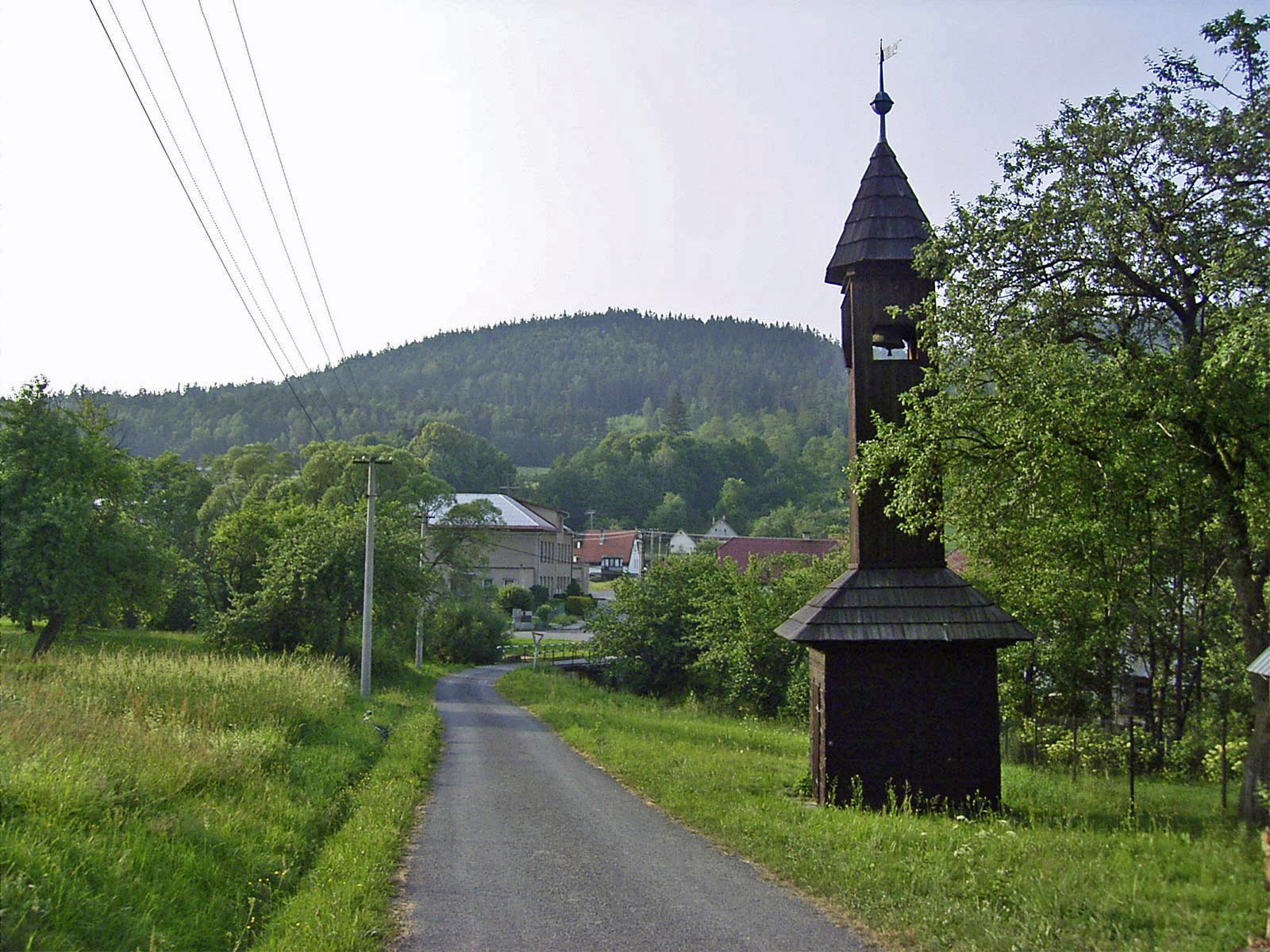
- Wooden belfry

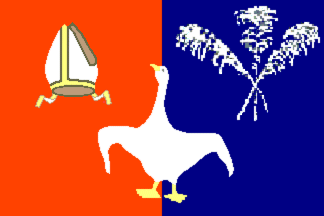
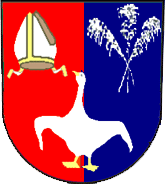
- Flag Coat of arms

- Location in the Czech Republic
- Coordinates: 49°24′49″N 17°55′30″E
- Country: Czech Republic
- Region: Zlín
- District: Vsetín
- First mentioned: 1505

Area
  - Total: 13.12 km^{2} (5.07 sq mi)
- Elevation: 335 m (1,099 ft)

Population (2026-01-01)
  - Total: 824
  - Density: 62.8/km^{2} (163/sq mi)
- Time zone: UTC+1 (CET)
  - Summer (DST): UTC+2 (CEST)
- Postal code: 756 24
- Website: www.mikuluvka.cz

Mikulůvka is a municipality and village in Vsetín District in the Zlín Region of the Czech Republic. It has about 800 inhabitants.

Mikulůvka lies approximately 9 kilometres (6 mi) north-west of Vsetín, 28 km (17 mi) north-east of Zlín, and 263 km (163 mi) east of Prague.

== Demographics ==
Historical population
Year	Pop.	±%
1869	641	—
1880	655	+2.2%
1890	686	+4.7%
1900	686	+0.0%
1910	727	+6.0%
1921	683	−6.1%
1930	769	+12.6%
1950	729	−5.2%
1961	855	+17.3%
1970	833	−2.6%
1980	759	−8.9%
1991	676	−10.9%
2001	664	−1.8%
2011	708	+6.6%
2021	805	+13.7%
Source: Censuses
