= Střítež nad Bečvou =

- Municipality
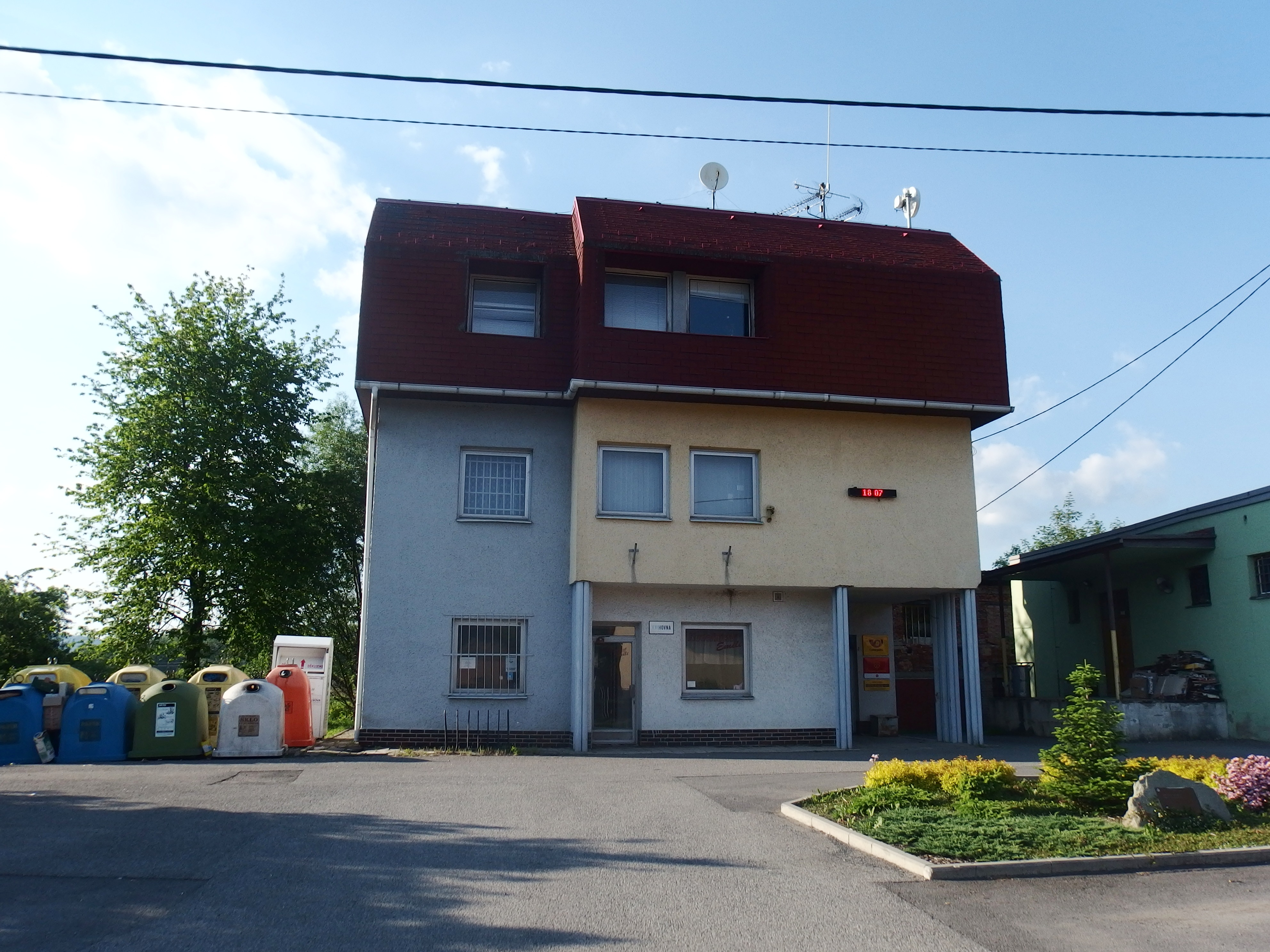
- Municipal office

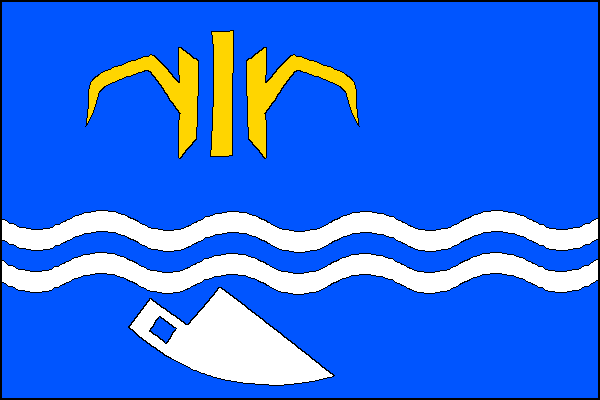
- Flag Coat of arms

- Location in the Czech Republic
- Coordinates: 49°27′31″N 18°3′25″E
- Country: Czech Republic
- Region: Zlín
- District: Vsetín
- First mentioned: 1376

Area
  - Total: 7.46 km^{2} (2.88 sq mi)
- Elevation: 334 m (1,096 ft)

Population (2026-01-01)
  - Total: 889
  - Density: 119/km^{2} (309/sq mi)
- Time zone: UTC+1 (CET)
  - Summer (DST): UTC+2 (CEST)
- Postal code: 756 52
- Website: striteznb.cz

Střítež nad Bečvou is a municipality and village in Vsetín District in the Zlín Region of the Czech Republic. It has about 900 inhabitants.

Střítež nad Bečvou lies approximately 14 kilometres (9 mi) north of Vsetín, 38 km (24 mi) north-east of Zlín, and 271 km (168 mi) east of Prague.

== Demographics ==
Historical population
Year	Pop.	±%
1869	736	—
1880	758	+3.0%
1890	769	+1.5%
1900	850	+10.5%
1910	908	+6.8%
1921	790	−13.0%
1930	840	+6.3%
1950	736	−12.4%
1961	845	+14.8%
1970	845	+0.0%
1980	804	−4.9%
1991	768	−4.5%
2001	789	+2.7%
2011	810	+2.7%
2021	844	+4.2%
Source: Censuses
