= Valašská Senice =

- Municipality
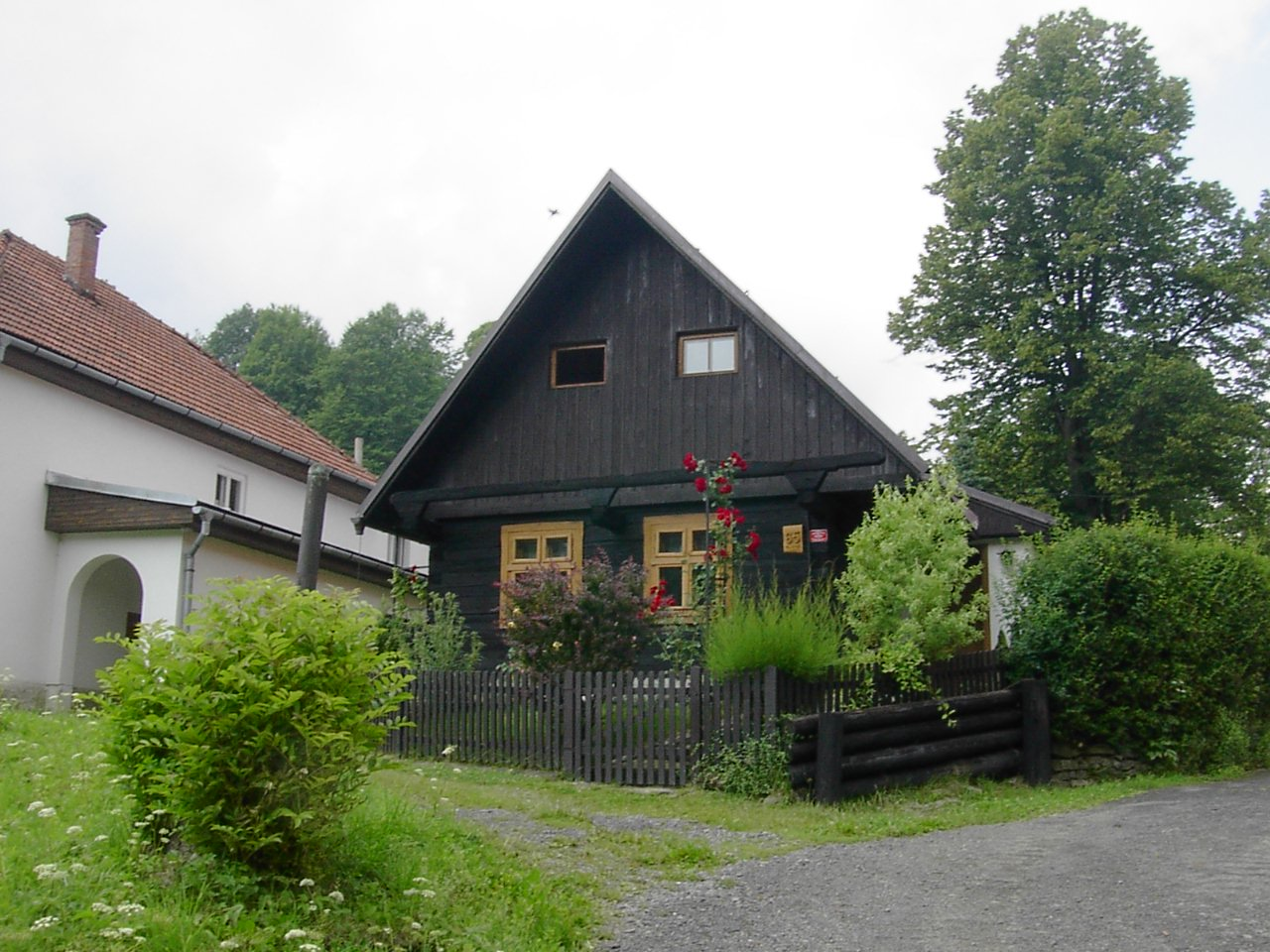
- Timbered cottage in the village

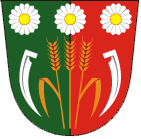
- Flag Coat of arms

- Location in the Czech Republic
- Coordinates: 49°13′31″N 18°7′1″E
- Country: Czech Republic
- Region: Zlín
- District: Vsetín
- First mentioned: 1500

Area
  - Total: 15.97 km^{2} (6.17 sq mi)
- Elevation: 540 m (1,770 ft)

Population (2026-01-01)
  - Total: 423
  - Density: 26.5/km^{2} (68.6/sq mi)
- Time zone: UTC+1 (CET)
  - Summer (DST): UTC+2 (CEST)
- Postal code: 756 14
- Website: www.valasskasenice.cz

Valašská Senice is a municipality and village in Vsetín District in the Zlín Region of the Czech Republic. It has about 400 inhabitants.

Valašská Senice lies approximately 16 kilometres (10 mi) south-east of Vsetín, 34 km (21 mi) east of Zlín, and 284 km (176 mi) east of Prague.

== Demographics ==
Historical population
Year	Pop.	±%
1869	623	—
1880	721	+15.7%
1890	701	−2.8%
1900	735	+4.9%
1910	798	+8.6%
1921	823	+3.1%
1930	738	−10.3%
1950	702	−4.9%
1961	759	+8.1%
1970	725	−4.5%
1980	607	−16.3%
1991	507	−16.5%
2001	480	−5.3%
2011	478	−0.4%
2021	408	−14.6%
Source: Censuses
