= Oznice =

- Municipality
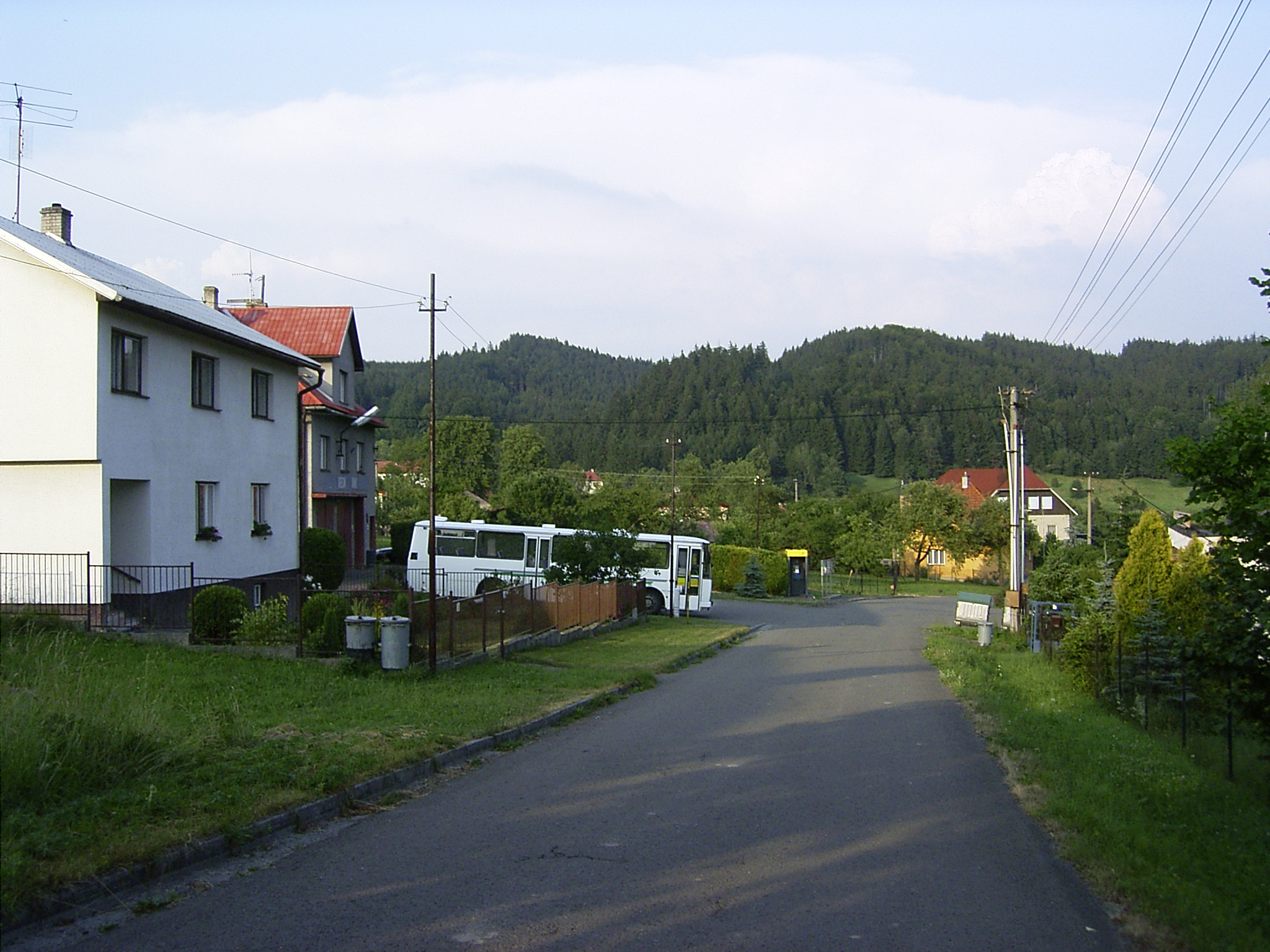
- A street in Oznice

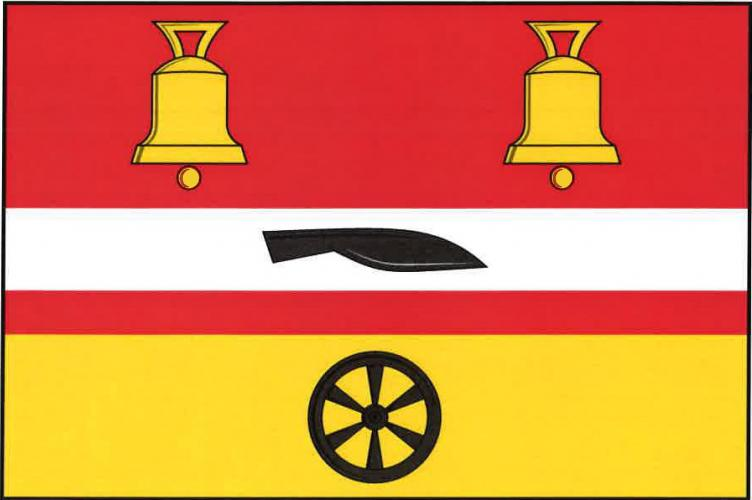
- Flag Coat of arms

- Location in the Czech Republic
- Coordinates: 49°25′57″N 17°55′2″E
- Country: Czech Republic
- Region: Zlín
- District: Vsetín
- First mentioned: 1376

Area
  - Total: 6.13 km^{2} (2.37 sq mi)
- Elevation: 380 m (1,250 ft)

Population (2026-01-01)
  - Total: 524
  - Density: 85.5/km^{2} (221/sq mi)
- Time zone: UTC+1 (CET)
  - Summer (DST): UTC+2 (CEST)
- Postal code: 756 24
- Website: www.oznice.cz

Oznice is a municipality and village in Vsetín District in the Zlín Region of the Czech Republic. It has about 500 inhabitants.

Oznice lies approximately 12 kilometres (7 mi) north-west of Vsetín, 29 km (18 mi) north-east of Zlín, and 262 km (163 mi) east of Prague.

== History ==
The first written mention of Oznice is from 1376.

== Demographics ==
Historical population
Year	Pop.	±%
1869	449	—
1880	469	+4.5%
1890	502	+7.0%
1900	519	+3.4%
1910	518	−0.2%
1921	489	−5.6%
1930	500	+2.2%
1950	439	−12.2%
1961	490	+11.6%
1970	424	−13.5%
1980	368	−13.2%
1991	335	−9.0%
2001	366	+9.3%
2011	415	+13.4%
2021	459	+10.6%
Source: Censuses
