= Valašská Polanka =

- Municipality
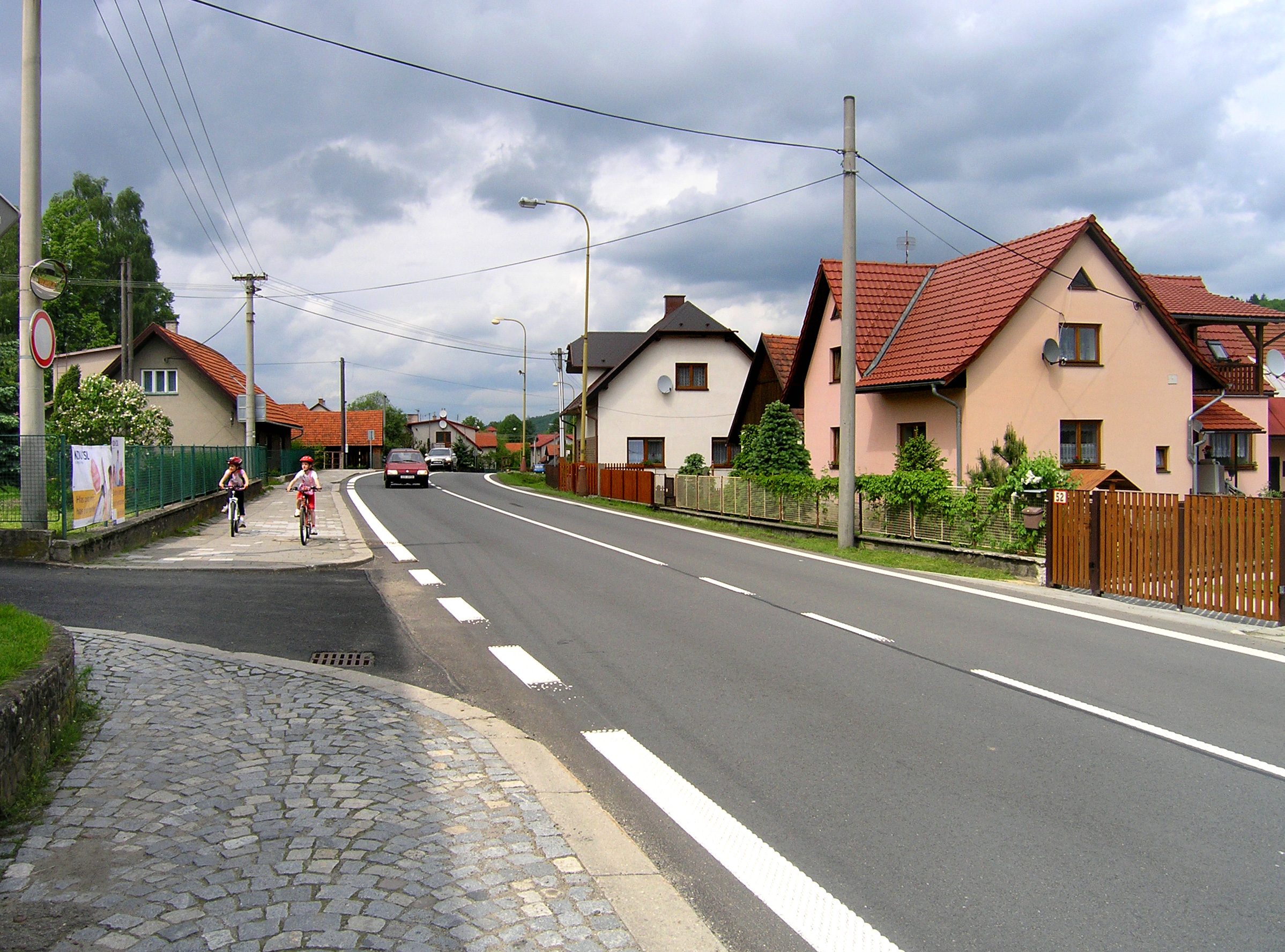
- Main street

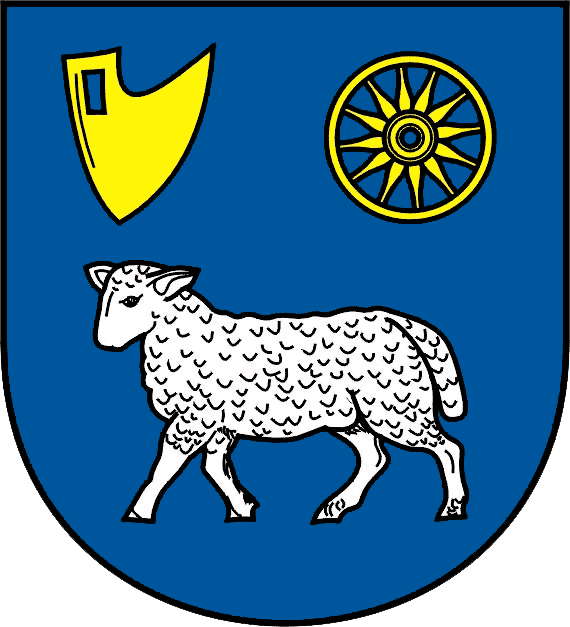
- Flag Coat of arms

- Location in the Czech Republic
- Coordinates: 49°15′44″N 17°59′48″E
- Country: Czech Republic
- Region: Zlín
- District: Vsetín
- First mentioned: 1361

Area
  - Total: 12.35 km^{2} (4.77 sq mi)
- Elevation: 388 m (1,273 ft)

Population (2026-01-01)
  - Total: 1,477
  - Density: 119.6/km^{2} (309.7/sq mi)
- Time zone: UTC+1 (CET)
  - Summer (DST): UTC+2 (CEST)
- Postal code: 756 11
- Website: www.valasskapolanka.cz

Valašská Polanka is a municipality and village in Vsetín District in the Zlín Region of the Czech Republic. It has about 1,500 inhabitants.

Valašská Polanka lies approximately 9 kilometres (6 mi) south of Vsetín, 25 km (16 mi) east of Zlín, and 274 km (170 mi) east of Prague.

== Etymology ==
The name is derivered from the region of Moravian Wallachia (Czech: Valašsko), in which it lies, and the Old Czech word polana, which meant a field lined with forest.

== History ==
The first written mention of Polanka is from 1361. The name of Valašská Polanka has been used since 1929.

== Demographics ==
Historical population
Year	Pop.	±%
1869	716	—
1880	751	+4.9%
1890	730	−2.8%
1900	786	+7.7%
1910	919	+16.9%
1921	889	−3.3%
1930	875	−1.6%
1950	1,095	+25.1%
1961	1,227	+12.1%
1970	1,176	−4.2%
1980	1,212	+3.1%
1991	1,246	+2.8%
2001	1,300	+4.3%
2011	1,356	+4.3%
2021	1,409	+3.9%
Source: Censuses
