= Police (Vsetín District) =

- Municipality
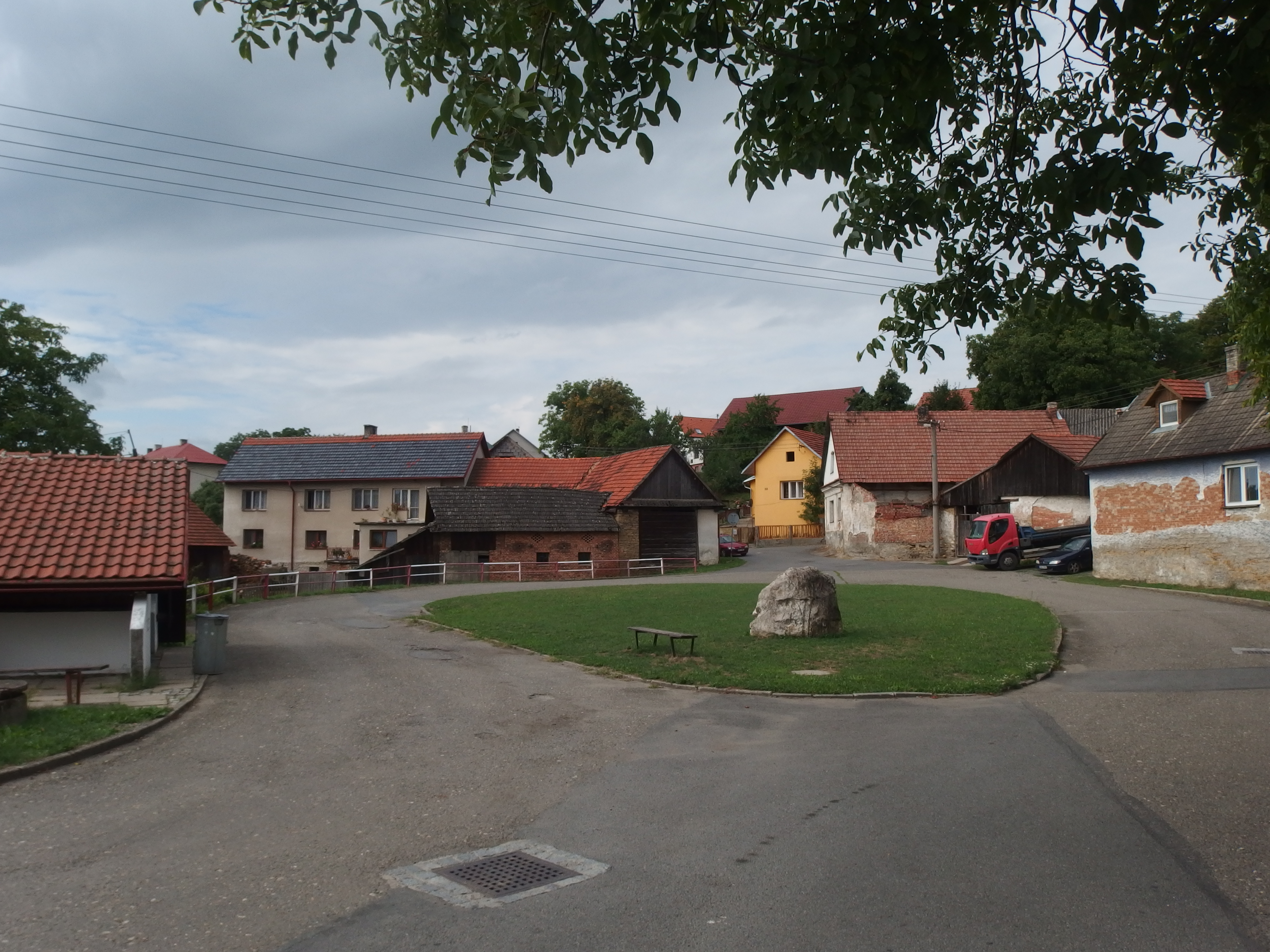
- Upper part of Police

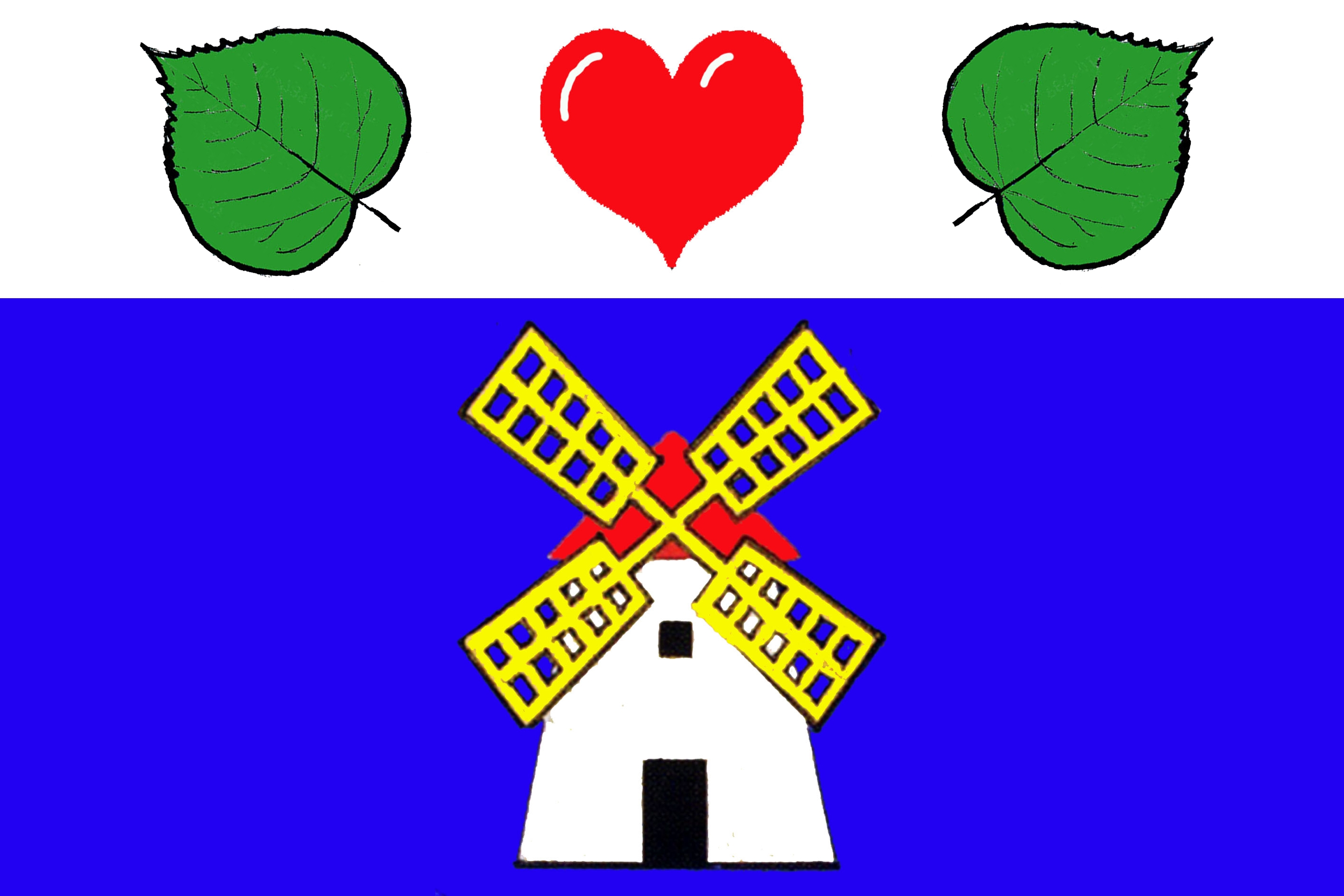
- Flag Coat of arms

- Location in the Czech Republic
- Coordinates: 49°27′24″N 17°52′3″E
- Country: Czech Republic
- Region: Zlín
- District: Vsetín
- First mentioned: 1383

Area
  - Total: 13.24 km^{2} (5.11 sq mi)
- Elevation: 415 m (1,362 ft)

Population (2026-01-01)
  - Total: 617
  - Density: 46.6/km^{2} (121/sq mi)
- Time zone: UTC+1 (CET)
  - Summer (DST): UTC+2 (CEST)
- Postal code: 756 44
- Website: www.obecpolice.cz

Police (Czech pronunciation: [ˈpolɪtsɛ]) is a municipality and village in Vsetín District in the Zlín Region of the Czech Republic. It has about 600 inhabitants.

Police lies approximately 16 kilometres (10 mi) north-west of Vsetín, 29 km (18 mi) north-east of Zlín, and 258 km (160 mi) east of Prague.

== Demographics ==
Historical population
| Year | Pop. | ±% |
|---|---|---|
| 1869 | 644 | — |
| 1880 | 690 | +7.1% |
| 1890 | 635 | −8.0% |
| 1900 | 634 | −0.2% |
| 1910 | 630 | −0.6% |
| 1921 | 610 | −3.2% |
| 1930 | 668 | +9.5% |
| 1950 | 655 | −1.9% |
| 1961 | 677 | +3.4% |
| 1970 | 583 | −13.9% |
| 1980 | 556 | −4.6% |
| 1991 | 515 | −7.4% |
| 2001 | 546 | +6.0% |
| 2011 | 537 | −1.6% |
| 2021 | 569 | +6.0% |
Source: Censuses
