= Kunovice (Vsetín District) =

- Municipality
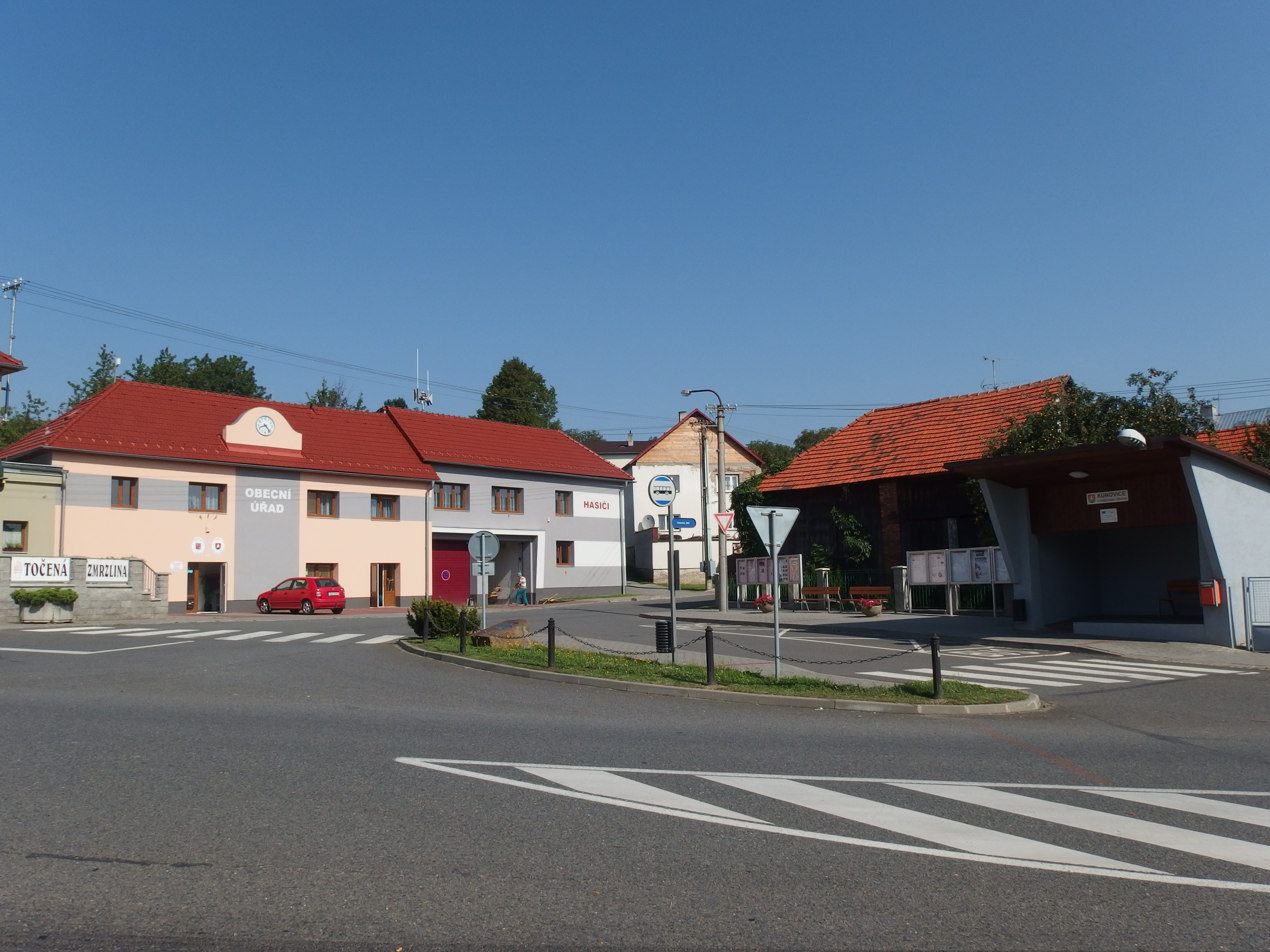
- Centre with the municipal office, fire station and bus stop

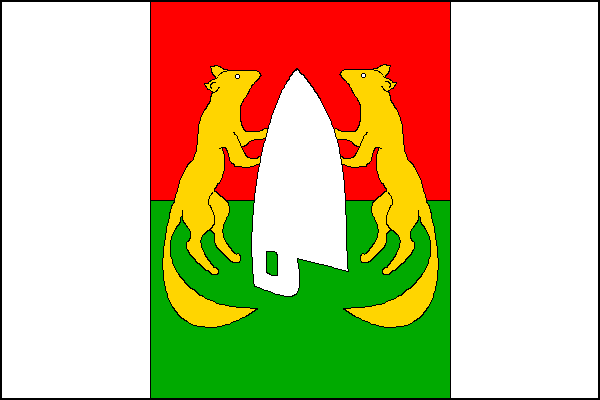
- Flag Coat of arms

- Location in the Czech Republic
- Coordinates: 49°26′39″N 17°48′36″E
- Country: Czech Republic
- Region: Zlín
- District: Vsetín
- First mentioned: 1131

Area
  - Total: 8.18 km^{2} (3.16 sq mi)
- Elevation: 407 m (1,335 ft)

Population (2026-01-01)
  - Total: 660
  - Density: 81/km^{2} (210/sq mi)
- Time zone: UTC+1 (CET)
  - Summer (DST): UTC+2 (CEST)
- Postal code: 756 44
- Website: www.obec-kunovice.cz

Kunovice is a municipality and village in Vsetín District in the Zlín Region of the Czech Republic. It has about 700 inhabitants.

Kunovice lies approximately 18 kilometres (11 mi) north-west of Vsetín, 26 km (16 mi) north-east of Zlín, and 254 km (158 mi) east of Prague.

== Demographics ==
Historical population
Year	Pop.	±%
1869	567	—
1880	624	+10.1%
1890	669	+7.2%
1900	630	−5.8%
1910	656	+4.1%
1921	687	+4.7%
1930	664	−3.3%
1950	685	+3.2%
1961	716	+4.5%
1970	670	−6.4%
1980	697	+4.0%
1991	642	−7.9%
2001	637	−0.8%
2011	602	−5.5%
2021	621	+3.2%
Source: Censuses
