= Zděchov =

- Municipality
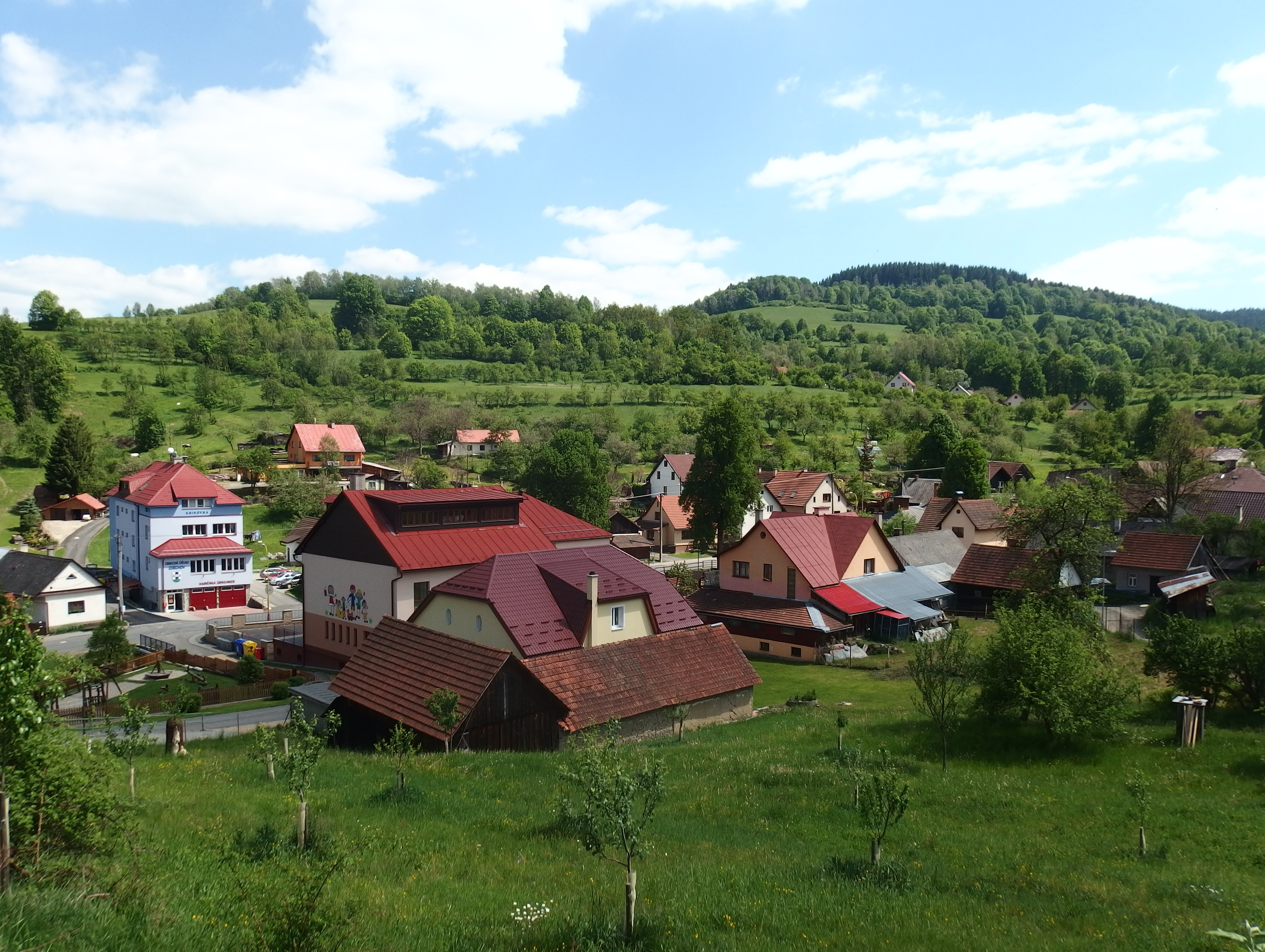
- Centre of Zděchov

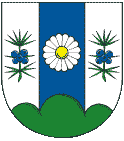
- Flag Coat of arms

- Location in the Czech Republic
- Coordinates: 49°15′39″N 18°4′40″E
- Country: Czech Republic
- Region: Zlín
- District: Vsetín
- First mentioned: 1623

Area
  - Total: 13.00 km^{2} (5.02 sq mi)
- Elevation: 500 m (1,600 ft)

Population (2026-01-01)
  - Total: 546
  - Density: 42.0/km^{2} (109/sq mi)
- Time zone: UTC+1 (CET)
  - Summer (DST): UTC+2 (CEST)
- Postal code: 756 07
- Website: www.zdechov.cz

Zděchov is a municipality and village in Vsetín District in the Zlín Region of the Czech Republic. It has about 500 inhabitants.

Zděchov lies approximately 12 kilometres (7 mi) south-east of Vsetín, 31 km (19 mi) east of Zlín, and 280 km (170 mi) east of Prague.

== Demographics ==
Historical population
Year	Pop.	±%
1869	888	—
1880	853	−3.9%
1890	745	−12.7%
1900	784	+5.2%
1910	859	+9.6%
1921	906	+5.5%
1930	827	−8.7%
1950	705	−14.8%
1961	823	+16.7%
1970	759	−7.8%
1980	657	−13.4%
1991	661	+0.6%
2001	664	+0.5%
2011	568	−14.5%
2021	525	−7.6%
Source: Censuses
