= Střelná =

- Municipality
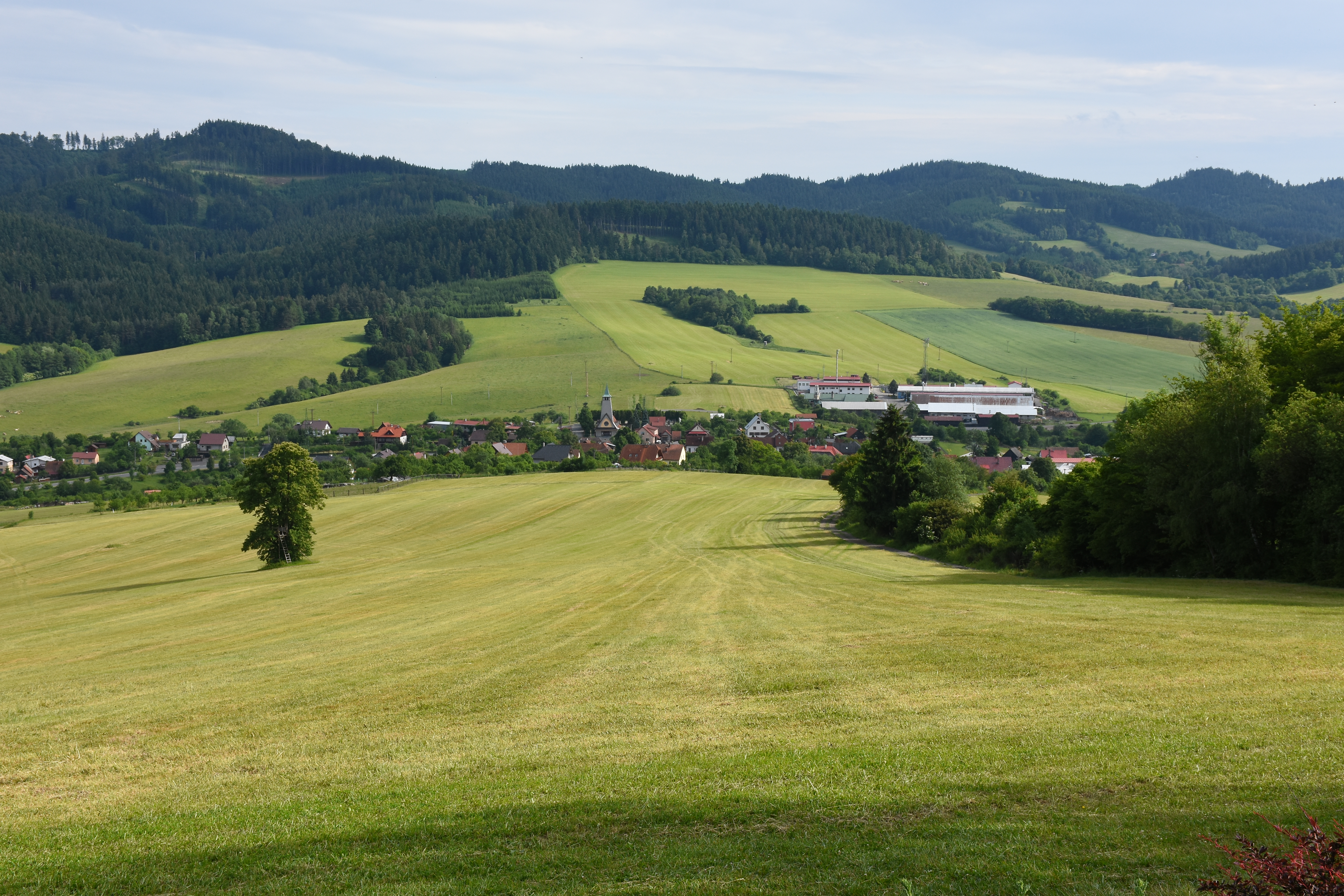
- View from the north

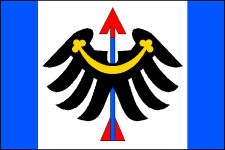
- Flag Coat of arms

- Location in the Czech Republic
- Coordinates: 49°10′38″N 18°5′52″E
- Country: Czech Republic
- Region: Zlín
- District: Vsetín
- First mentioned: 1511

Area
  - Total: 9.26 km^{2} (3.58 sq mi)
- Elevation: 510 m (1,670 ft)

Population (2026-01-01)
  - Total: 539
  - Density: 58.2/km^{2} (151/sq mi)
- Time zone: UTC+1 (CET)
  - Summer (DST): UTC+2 (CEST)
- Postal code: 756 12
- Website: www.strelna.cz

Střelná is a municipality and village in Vsetín District in the Zlín Region of the Czech Republic. It has about 500 inhabitants.

Střelná lies approximately 21 kilometres (13 mi) south-east of Vsetín, 34 km (21 mi) east of Zlín, and 285 km (177 mi) east of Prague.

== Demographics ==
Historical population
Year	Pop.	±%
1869	549	—
1880	552	+0.5%
1890	596	+8.0%
1900	676	+13.4%
1910	676	+0.0%
1921	705	+4.3%
1930	727	+3.1%
1950	663	−8.8%
1961	807	+21.7%
1970	732	−9.3%
1980	717	−2.0%
1991	625	−12.8%
2001	625	+0.0%
2011	628	+0.5%
2021	533	−15.1%
Source: Censuses
