= Lhota u Vsetína =

- Municipality
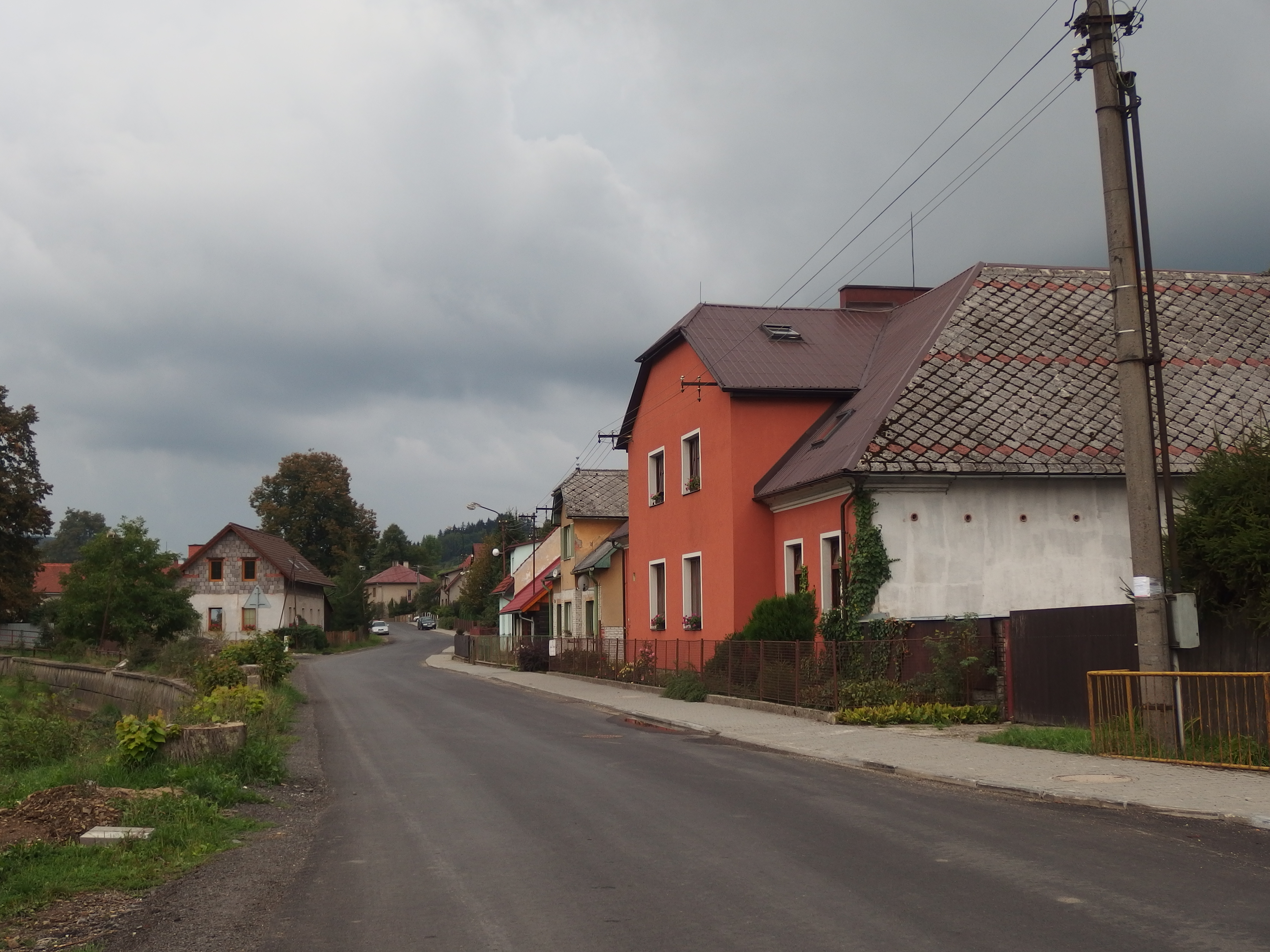
- Main street

- Flag Coat of arms

- Location in the Czech Republic
- Coordinates: 49°18′16″N 17°57′29″E
- Country: Czech Republic
- Region: Zlín
- District: Vsetín
- First mentioned: 1666

Area
  - Total: 11.26 km^{2} (4.35 sq mi)
- Elevation: 393 m (1,289 ft)

Population (2026-01-01)
  - Total: 792
  - Density: 70.3/km^{2} (182/sq mi)
- Time zone: UTC+1 (CET)
  - Summer (DST): UTC+2 (CEST)
- Postal code: 755 01
- Website: www.lhotauvsetina.cz

Lhota u Vsetína is a municipality and village in Vsetín District in the Zlín Region of the Czech Republic. It has about 800 inhabitants.

Lhota u Vsetína lies approximately 5 kilometres (3 mi) south-west of Vsetín, 23 km (14 mi) east of Zlín, and 269 km (167 mi) east of Prague.

== Demographics ==
Historical population
Year	Pop.	±%
1869	721	—
1880	732	+1.5%
1890	749	+2.3%
1900	825	+10.1%
1910	878	+6.4%
1921	850	−3.2%
1930	810	−4.7%
1950	862	+6.4%
1961	948	+10.0%
1970	851	−10.2%
1980	795	−6.6%
1991	739	−7.0%
2001	725	−1.9%
2011	751	+3.6%
2021	733	−2.4%
Source: Censuses
