= Seninka =

- Municipality
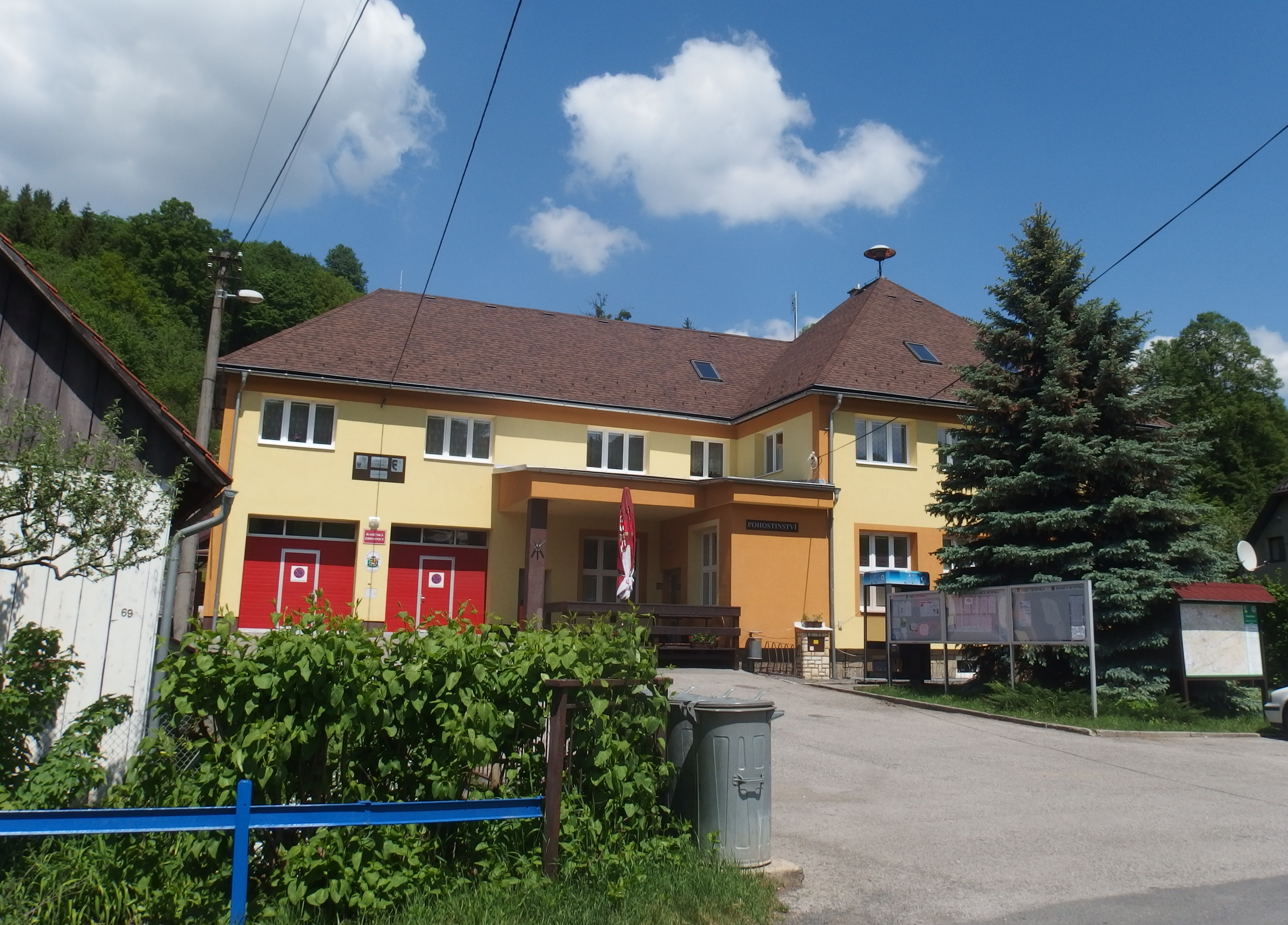
- Municipal office

- Flag Coat of arms

- Location in the Czech Republic
- Coordinates: 49°16′24″N 17°57′54″E
- Country: Czech Republic
- Region: Zlín
- District: Vsetín
- First mentioned: 1500

Area
  - Total: 7.26 km^{2} (2.80 sq mi)
- Elevation: 428 m (1,404 ft)

Population (2026-01-01)
  - Total: 296
  - Density: 40.8/km^{2} (106/sq mi)
- Time zone: UTC+1 (CET)
  - Summer (DST): UTC+2 (CEST)
- Postal code: 756 11
- Website: www.seninka.cz

Seninka is a municipality and village in Vsetín District in the Zlín Region of the Czech Republic. It has about 300 inhabitants.

Seninka lies approximately 8 kilometres (5 mi) south of Vsetín, 22 km (14 mi) east of Zlín, and 271 km (168 mi) east of Prague.

== Demographics ==
Historical population
Year	Pop.	±%
1869	390	—
1880	433	+11.0%
1890	431	−0.5%
1900	422	−2.1%
1910	455	+7.8%
1921	413	−9.2%
1930	430	+4.1%
1950	377	−12.3%
1961	413	+9.5%
1970	398	−3.6%
1980	363	−8.8%
1991	331	−8.8%
2001	317	−4.2%
2011	318	+0.3%
2021	292	−8.2%
Source: Censuses
