= Lidečko =

- Municipality
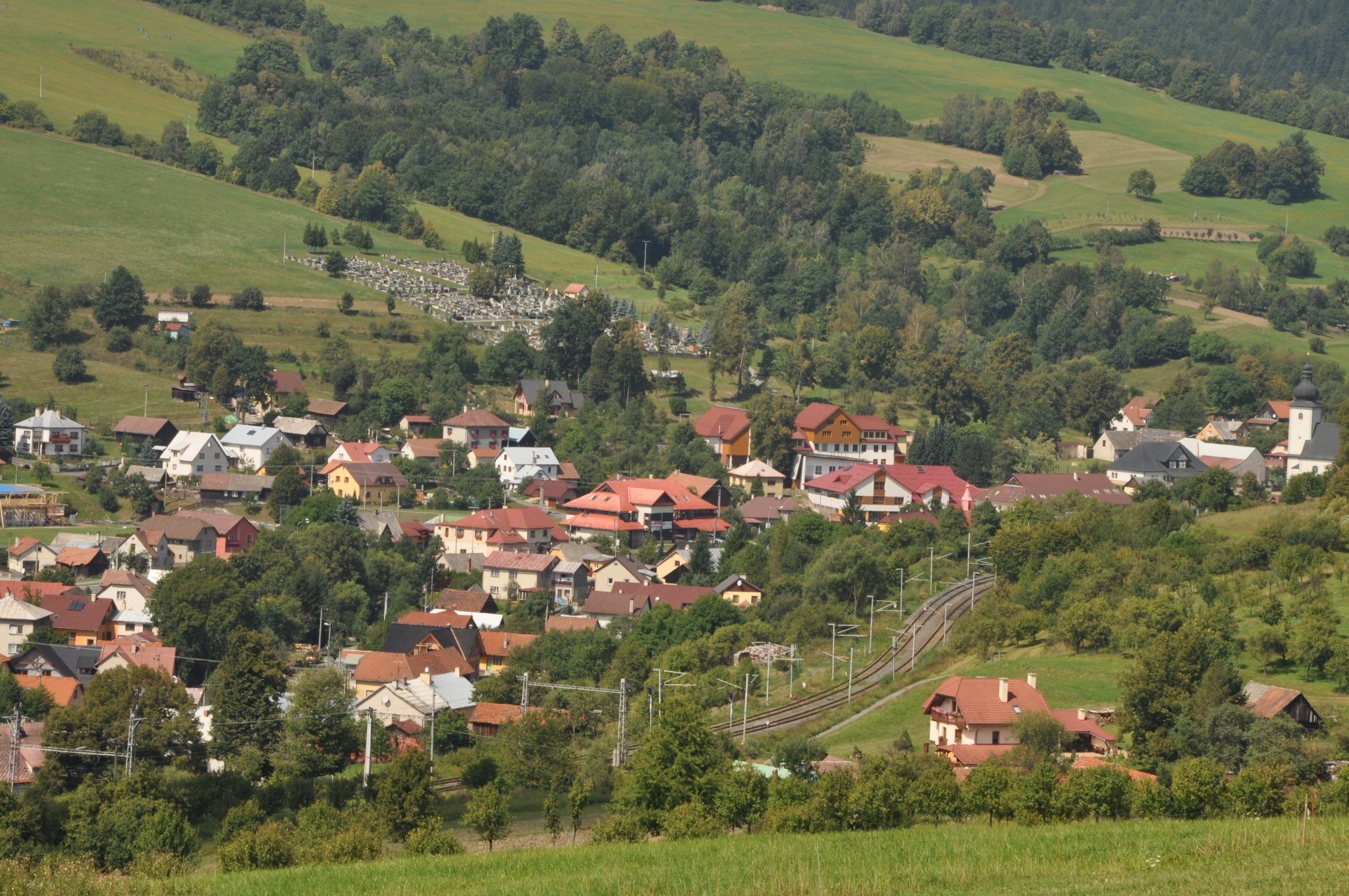
- General view of Lidečko

- Flag Coat of arms

- Location in the Czech Republic
- Coordinates: 49°12′11″N 18°3′5″E
- Country: Czech Republic
- Region: Zlín
- District: Vsetín
- First mentioned: 1424

Area
  - Total: 17.37 km^{2} (6.71 sq mi)
- Elevation: 445 m (1,460 ft)

Population (2026-01-01)
  - Total: 1,813
  - Density: 104.4/km^{2} (270.3/sq mi)
- Time zone: UTC+1 (CET)
  - Summer (DST): UTC+2 (CEST)
- Postal code: 756 12
- Website: www.lidecko.cz

Lidečko is a municipality and village in Vsetín District in the Zlín Region of the Czech Republic. It has about 1,800 inhabitants.

Lidečko lies approximately 16 kilometres (10 mi) south of Vsetín, 28 km (17 mi) east of Zlín, and 280 km (170 mi) east of Prague.

== Demographics ==
Historical population
Year	Pop.	±%
1869	958	—
1880	1,078	+12.5%
1890	1,092	+1.3%
1900	1,159	+6.1%
1910	1,182	+2.0%
1921	1,219	+3.1%
1930	1,330	+9.1%
1950	1,472	+10.7%
1961	1,782	+21.1%
1970	1,914	+7.4%
1980	1,877	−1.9%
1991	1,784	−5.0%
2001	1,825	+2.3%
2011	1,790	−1.9%
2021	1,719	−4.0%
Source: Censuses
