= Kladeruby =

- Municipality
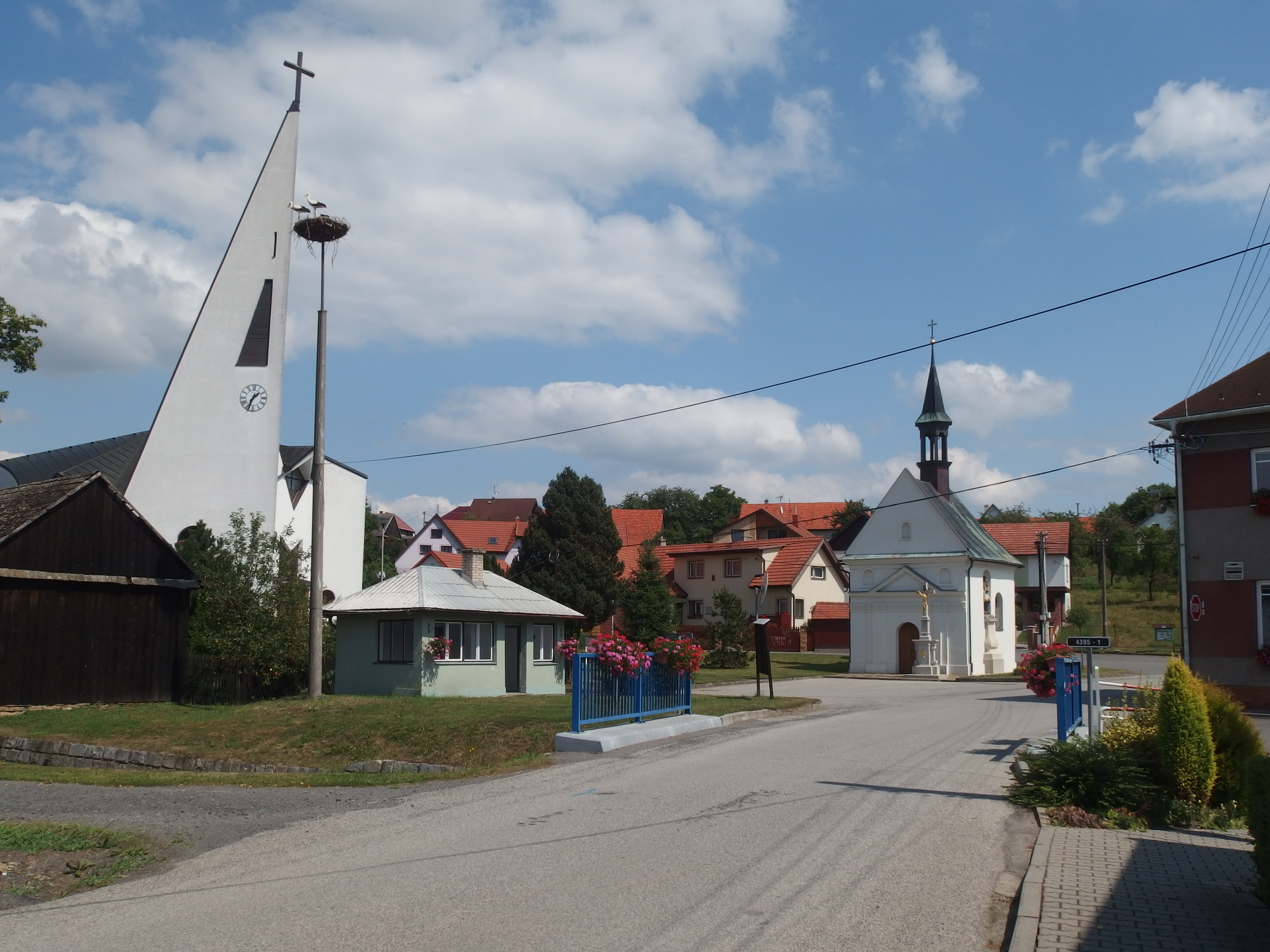
- Centre of Kladeruby with the Church of Saints Cyril and Methodius

- Flag Coat of arms

- Location in the Czech Republic
- Coordinates: 49°29′34″N 17°51′55″E
- Country: Czech Republic
- Region: Zlín
- District: Vsetín
- First mentioned: 1141

Area
  - Total: 6.94 km^{2} (2.68 sq mi)
- Elevation: 305 m (1,001 ft)

Population (2026-01-01)
  - Total: 488
  - Density: 70.3/km^{2} (182/sq mi)
- Time zone: UTC+1 (CET)
  - Summer (DST): UTC+2 (CEST)
- Postal code: 756 43
- Website: www.kladeruby.cz

Kladeruby is a municipality and village in Vsetín District in the Zlín Region of the Czech Republic. It has about 500 inhabitants.

Kladeruby lies approximately 20 kilometres (12 mi) north-west of Vsetín, 33 km (21 mi) north-east of Zlín, and 257 km (160 mi) east of Prague.

== History ==
The first written mention of Kladeruby is from 1141.

== Demographics ==
Historical population
| Year | Pop. | ±% |
|---|---|---|
| 1869 | 501 | — |
| 1880 | 498 | −0.6% |
| 1890 | 518 | +4.0% |
| 1900 | 491 | −5.2% |
| 1910 | 532 | +8.4% |
| 1921 | 507 | −4.7% |
| 1930 | 512 | +1.0% |
| 1950 | 461 | −10.0% |
| 1961 | 489 | +6.1% |
| 1970 | 501 | +2.5% |
| 1980 | 492 | −1.8% |
| 1991 | 439 | −10.8% |
| 2001 | 442 | +0.7% |
| 2011 | 429 | −2.9% |
| 2021 | 451 | +5.1% |
Source: Censuses
