= Podolí (Vsetín District) =

- Municipality
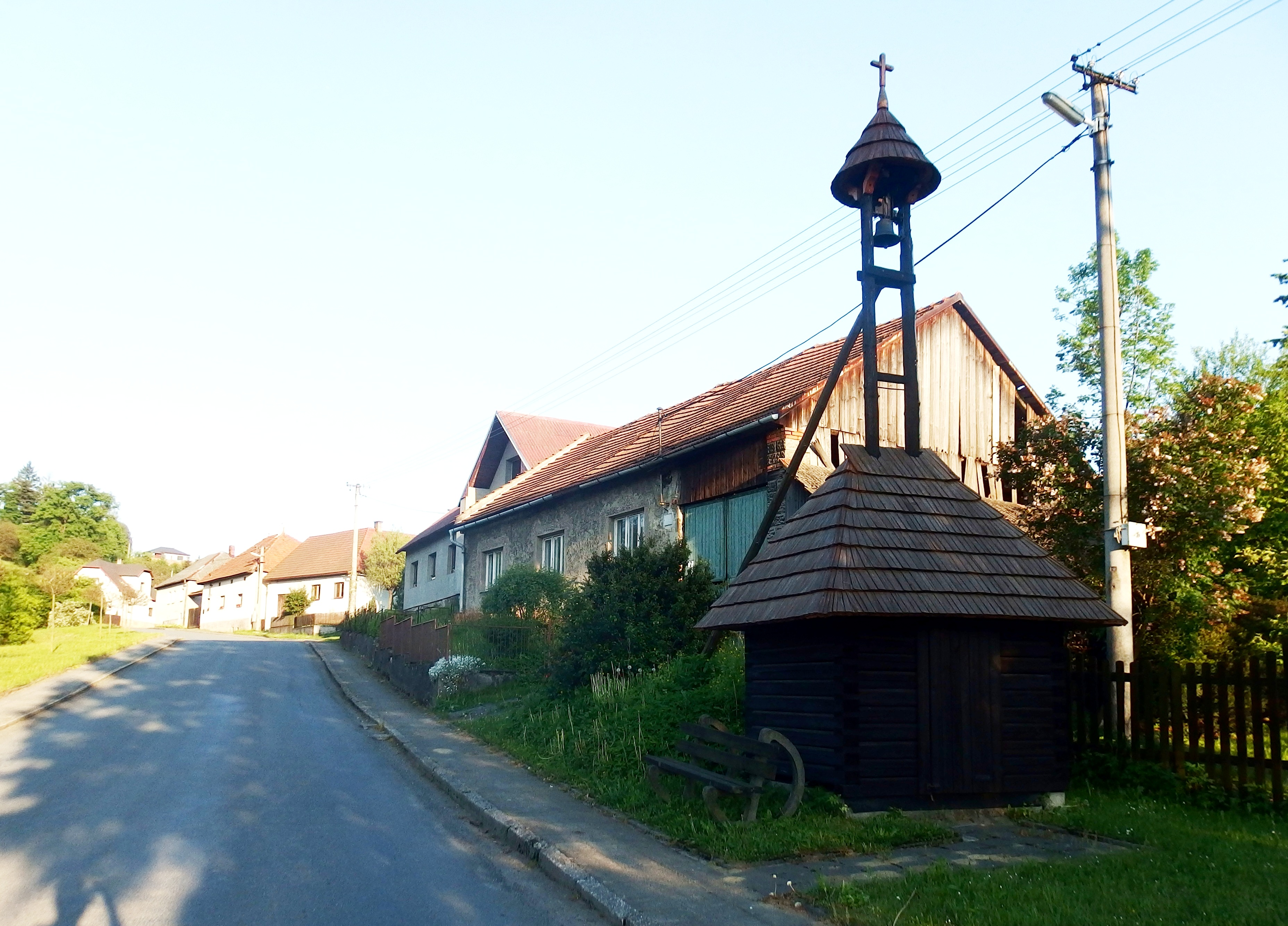
- Wooden belfry

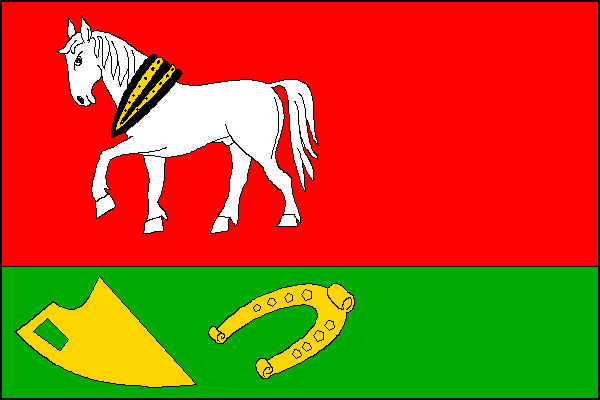
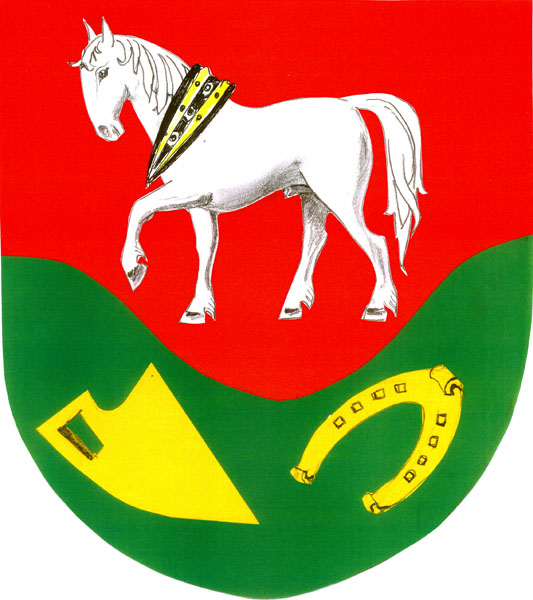
- Flag Coat of arms

- Location in the Czech Republic
- Coordinates: 49°25′49″N 17°51′26″E
- Country: Czech Republic
- Region: Zlín
- District: Vsetín
- First mentioned: 1370

Area
  - Total: 5.75 km^{2} (2.22 sq mi)
- Elevation: 440 m (1,440 ft)

Population (2026-01-01)
  - Total: 315
  - Density: 54.8/km^{2} (142/sq mi)
- Time zone: UTC+1 (CET)
  - Summer (DST): UTC+2 (CEST)
- Postal code: 756 44
- Website: www.obecpodoli.info

Podolí is a municipality and village in Vsetín District in the Zlín Region of the Czech Republic. It has about 300 inhabitants.

== Geography ==
Podolí is located about 14 kilometres (9 mi) northwest of Vsetín and 26 km (16 mi) northeast of Zlín. It lies in the Hostýn-Vsetín Mountains. The highest point is the mountain Kříbec at 659 m (2,162 ft) above sea level.

== Demographics ==
Historical population
| Year | Pop. | ±% |
|---|---|---|
| 1869 | 334 | — |
| 1880 | 387 | +15.9% |
| 1890 | 383 | −1.0% |
| 1900 | 357 | −6.8% |
| 1910 | 352 | −1.4% |
| 1921 | 348 | −1.1% |
| 1930 | 335 | −3.7% |
| 1950 | 309 | −7.8% |
| 1961 | 329 | +6.5% |
| 1970 | 271 | −17.6% |
| 1980 | 237 | −12.5% |
| 1991 | 214 | −9.7% |
| 2001 | 218 | +1.9% |
| 2011 | 226 | +3.7% |
| 2021 | 252 | +11.5% |
Source: Censuses
