= Kateřinice (Vsetín District) =

- Municipality
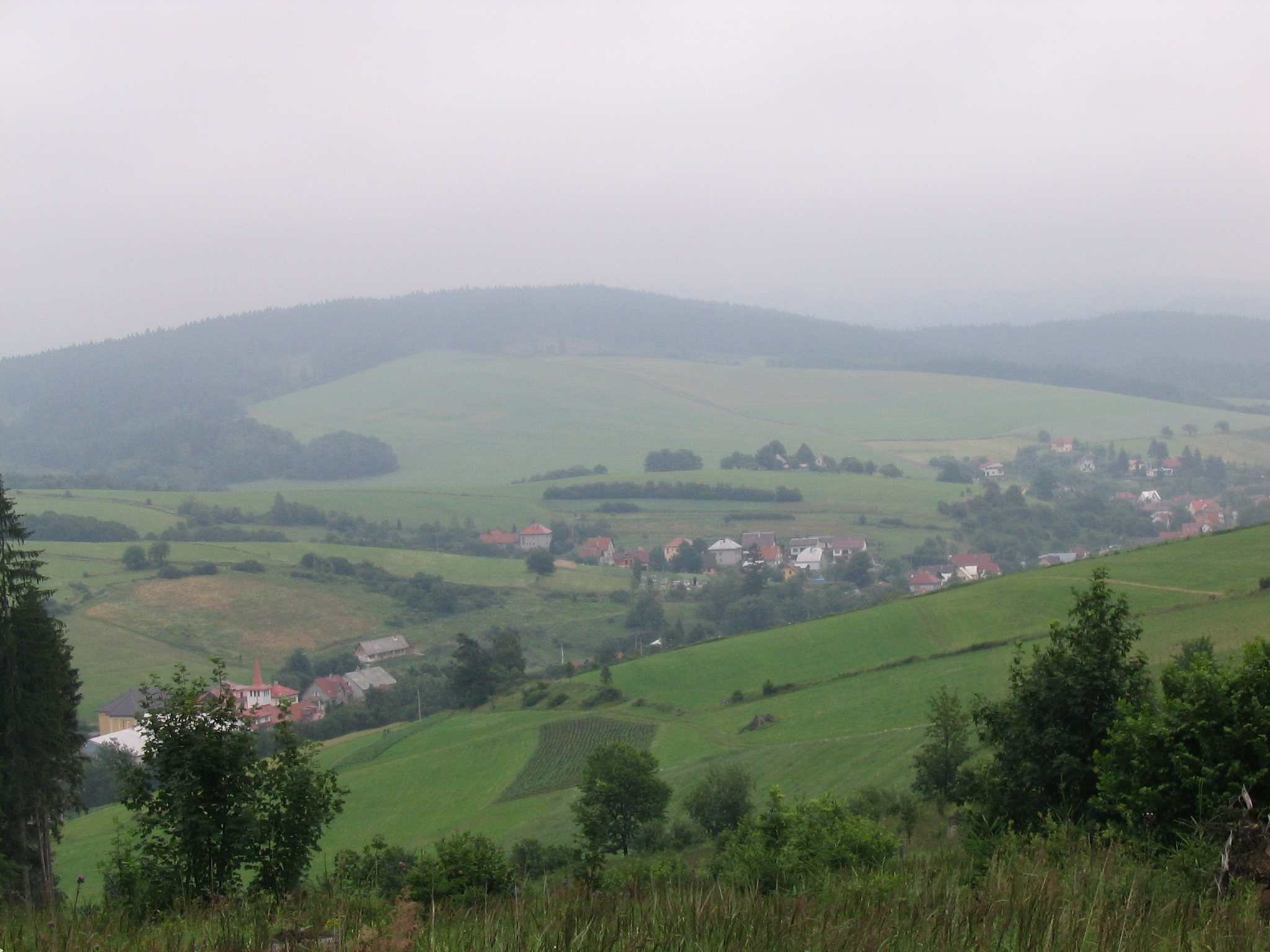
- General view of Kateřinice

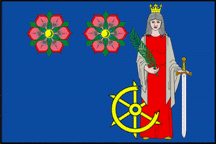
- Flag Coat of arms

- Location in the Czech Republic
- Coordinates: 49°22′56″N 17°53′9″E
- Country: Czech Republic
- Region: Zlín
- District: Vsetín
- First mentioned: 1505

Area
  - Total: 13.36 km^{2} (5.16 sq mi)
- Elevation: 390 m (1,280 ft)

Population (2026-01-01)
  - Total: 1,084
  - Density: 81.14/km^{2} (210.1/sq mi)
- Time zone: UTC+1 (CET)
  - Summer (DST): UTC+2 (CEST)
- Postal code: 756 21
- Website: www.obeckaterinice.cz

Kateřinice is a municipality and village in Vsetín District in the Zlín Region of the Czech Republic. It has about 1,100 inhabitants.

Kateřinice lies approximately 10 kilometres (6 mi) north-west of Vsetín, 24 km (15 mi) north-east of Zlín, and 261 km (162 mi) east of Prague.

== Demographics ==
Historical population
| Year | Pop. | ±% |
|---|---|---|
| 1869 | 1,059 | — |
| 1880 | 1,139 | +7.6% |
| 1890 | 1,100 | −3.4% |
| 1900 | 986 | −10.4% |
| 1910 | 936 | −5.1% |
| 1921 | 934 | −0.2% |
| 1930 | 923 | −1.2% |
| 1950 | 987 | +6.9% |
| 1961 | 1,121 | +13.6% |
| 1970 | 1,075 | −4.1% |
| 1980 | 1,008 | −6.2% |
| 1991 | 949 | −5.9% |
| 2001 | 919 | −3.2% |
| 2011 | 954 | +3.8% |
| 2021 | 1,026 | +7.5% |
Source: Censuses
