= Huslenky =

- Municipality
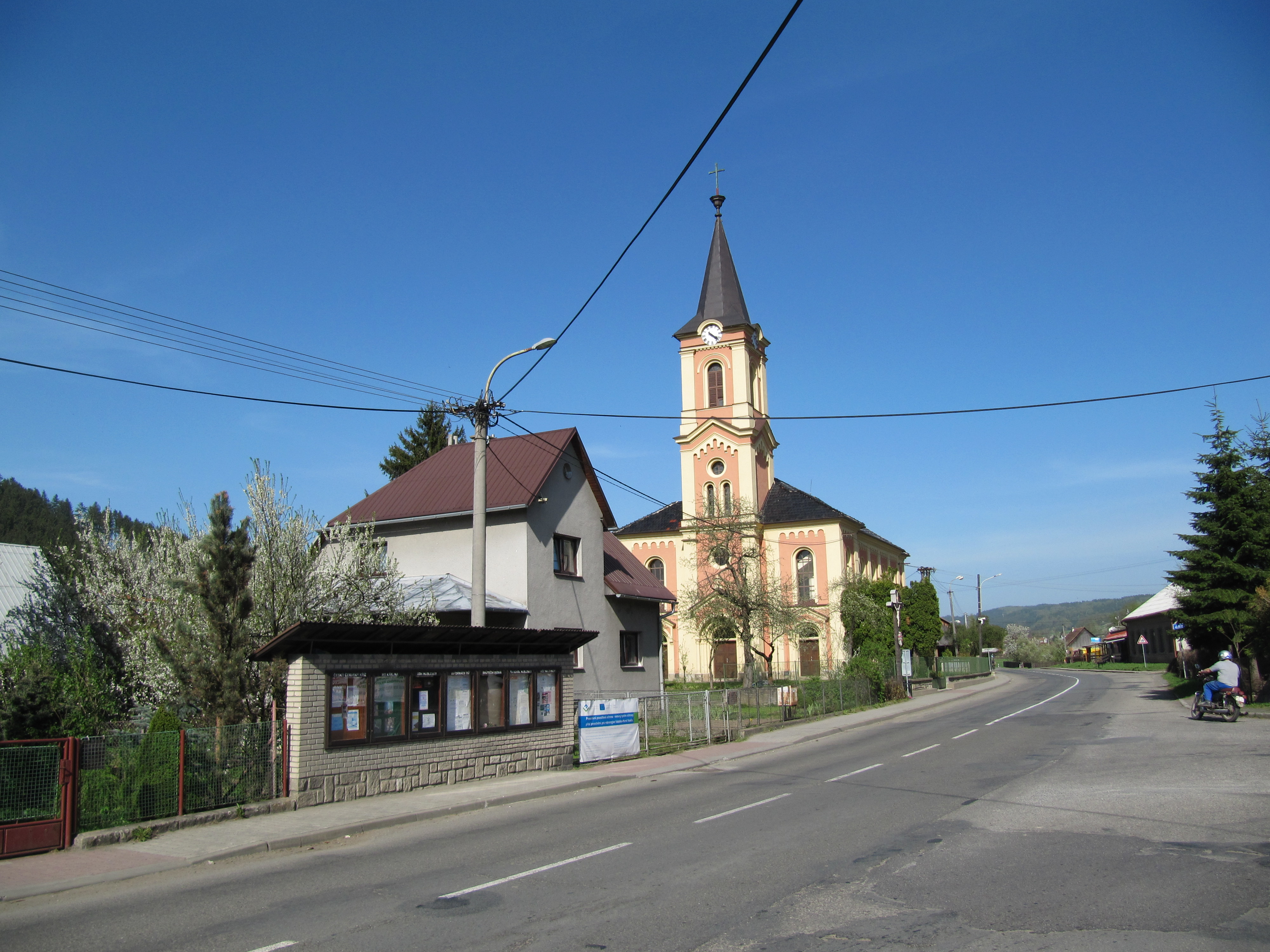
- Evangelical church

- Flag Coat of arms

- Location in the Czech Republic
- Coordinates: 49°18′11″N 18°5′25″E
- Country: Czech Republic
- Region: Zlín
- District: Vsetín
- First mentioned: 1505

Area
  - Total: 35.07 km^{2} (13.54 sq mi)
- Elevation: 390 m (1,280 ft)

Population (2026-01-01)
  - Total: 2,159
  - Density: 61.56/km^{2} (159.4/sq mi)
- Time zone: UTC+1 (CET)
  - Summer (DST): UTC+2 (CEST)
- Postal code: 756 02
- Website: www.huslenky.cz

Huslenky is a municipality and village in Vsetín District in the Zlín Region of the Czech Republic. It has about 2,200 inhabitants.

== Geography ==
Huslenky is located about 8 kilometres (5 mi) southeast of Vsetín and 31 km (19 mi) east of Zlín. It borders Slovakia in the southeast. The municipality lies on the border between the Maple Mountains and Hostýn-Vsetín Mountains. The highest point is the Makyta mountain at 923 m (3,028 ft) above sea level, whose peak is on the Czech–Slovak border. The built-up area is situated in the valley of the Vsetínská Bečva River and its tributary, the Kychová Stream, which originates here. The whole territory of Huslenky lies in the Beskydy Protected Landscape Area.

== History ==
The first written mention of Huslenky is from 1505, when the village was called Huslná. After the establishment of modern municipalities, it was an administrative part of Hovězí. In 1949, Huslenky became an independent municipality.

== Demographics ==
Historical population

Year	Pop.	±%
1869	–	—
1880	–	—
1890	1,346	—
1900	1,632	+21.2%
1910	1,756	+7.6%

Year	Pop.	±%
1921	1,857	+5.8%
1930	2,024	+9.0%
1950	2,222	+9.8%
1961	2,516	+13.2%
1970	2,413	−4.1%

Year	Pop.	±%
1980	2,133	−11.6%
1991	2,120	−0.6%
2001	2,088	−1.5%
2011	2,085	−0.1%
2021	2,084	−0.0%

Source: Censuses

== Transport ==
Huslenky is located on the railway line Vsetín–Velké Karlovice.

== Sights ==
The main landmark of Huslenky is the Evangelical church. It was built in 1873–1896. It replaced an older wooden church.

The area called Kychová, situated on the slopes above the Kychová Stream, is protected as a village monument zone. It consists of well-preserved wooden buildings built in the local folk architecture.
