= Nový Hrozenkov =

- Market town
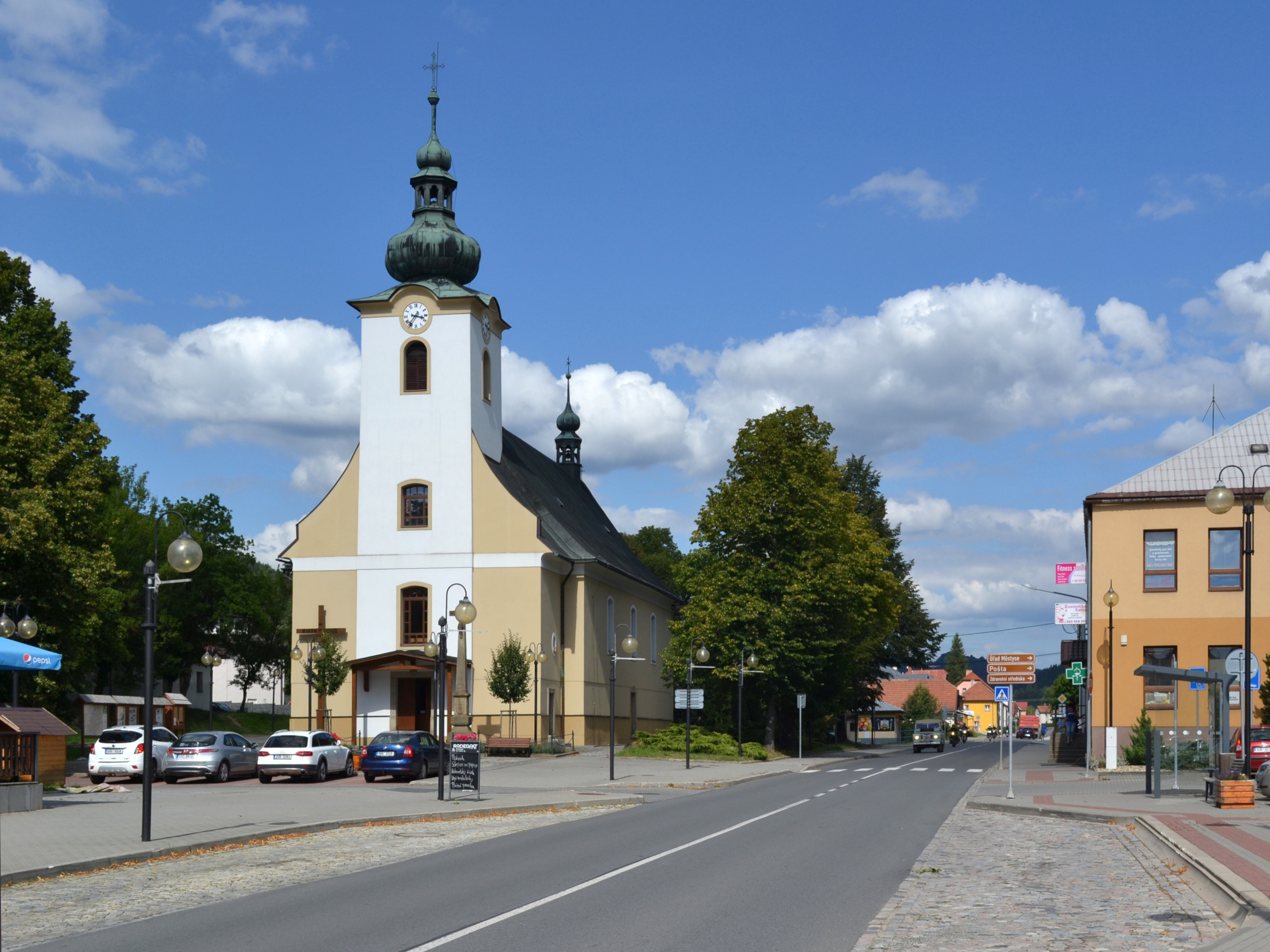
- Centre of Nový Hrozenkov

- Flag Coat of arms

- Location in the Czech Republic
- Coordinates: 49°20′13″N 18°11′53″E
- Country: Czech Republic
- Region: Zlín
- District: Vsetín
- Founded: 1649

Area
  - Total: 43.43 km^{2} (16.77 sq mi)
- Elevation: 453 m (1,486 ft)

Population (2026-01-01)
  - Total: 2,480
  - Density: 57.1/km^{2} (148/sq mi)
- Time zone: UTC+1 (CET)
  - Summer (DST): UTC+2 (CEST)
- Postal code: 756 04
- Website: www.novyhrozenkov.cz

Nový Hrozenkov (Czech pronunciation: [ˈnoviː ˈɦrozɛŋkof]) is a market town in Vsetín District in the Zlín Region of the Czech Republic. It has about 2,500 inhabitants.

== Etymology ==
After its establishment, the municipality was first Nová Dědina (literally 'new village') or Rozinkov, probably after Rozina, who was the wife of the land owner. Later the name was distorted to Hrozenkov. From the early 19th century, the name Nový Hrozenkov ('new Hrozenkov') has been used to distinguish from Starý Hrozenkov.

== Geography ==
Nový Hrozenkov is located about 15 kilometres (9 mi) east of Vsetín and 40 km (25 mi) east of Zlín. It borders Slovakia in the south. It lies on the border between the Hostýn-Vsetín Mountains and Maple Mountains. The highest point is the Stolečný mountain at 962 m (3,156 ft) above sea level, which top is on the Czech–Slovak border. The market town proper is situated in the valley of the Vsetínská Bečva River. The whole territory of Nový Hrozenkov lies in the Beskydy Protected Landscape Area.

== History ==
Until 1649, the area was part of Hovězí, which belonged to the Vsetín estate owned by Mikuláš Pázmány. In 1649, 41 homesteads separated from Hovězí and established the new municipality.

== Demographics ==
Historical population

Year	Pop.	±%
1869	3,635	—
1880	3,338	−8.2%
1890	3,628	+8.7%
1900	3,280	−9.6%
1910	3,237	−1.3%

Year	Pop.	±%
1921	2,979	−8.0%
1930	3,196	+7.3%
1950	2,895	−9.4%
1961	3,233	+11.7%
1970	3,017	−6.7%

Year	Pop.	±%
1980	2,834	−6.1%
1991	2,704	−4.6%
2001	2,750	+1.7%
2011	2,616	−4.9%
2021	2,397	−8.4%

Source: Censuses

== Transport ==
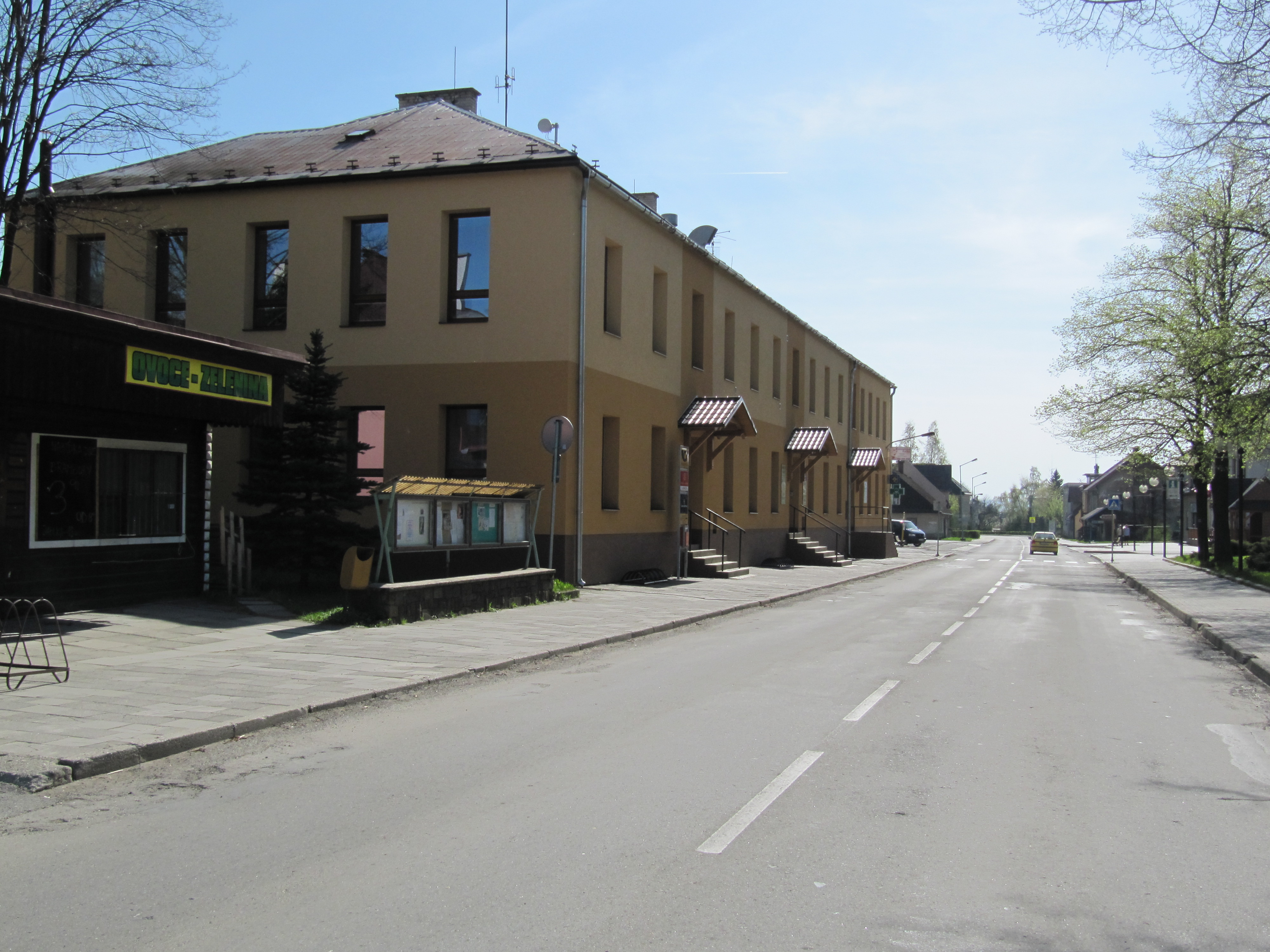
Post office on the main street

Nový Hrozenkov is located on the railway line Vsetín–Velké Karlovice.

== Sights ==
Among the protected cultural monuments in the market town are a monument of fallen partisans on the local cemetery and two rural homesteads, built in 1830 and 1835. One of the homesteads now houses Memorial of Antonín Strnadel, a small museum dedicated to this painter and graphic artist, who had his atelier there in 1935–1936.

The main landmark of Nový Hrozenkov is the Church of Saint John the Baptist. Its construction was finished in 1789.

== Notable people ==
- Hubert Pilčík (1891–1951), serial killer
- Leon Joseph Koerner (1892–1972), Canadian industrialist and philanthropist
- Otto Dov Kulka (1933–2021), Israeli historian
- Vítězslav Országh (born 1943), weightlifter
