= Halenkov =

- Municipality
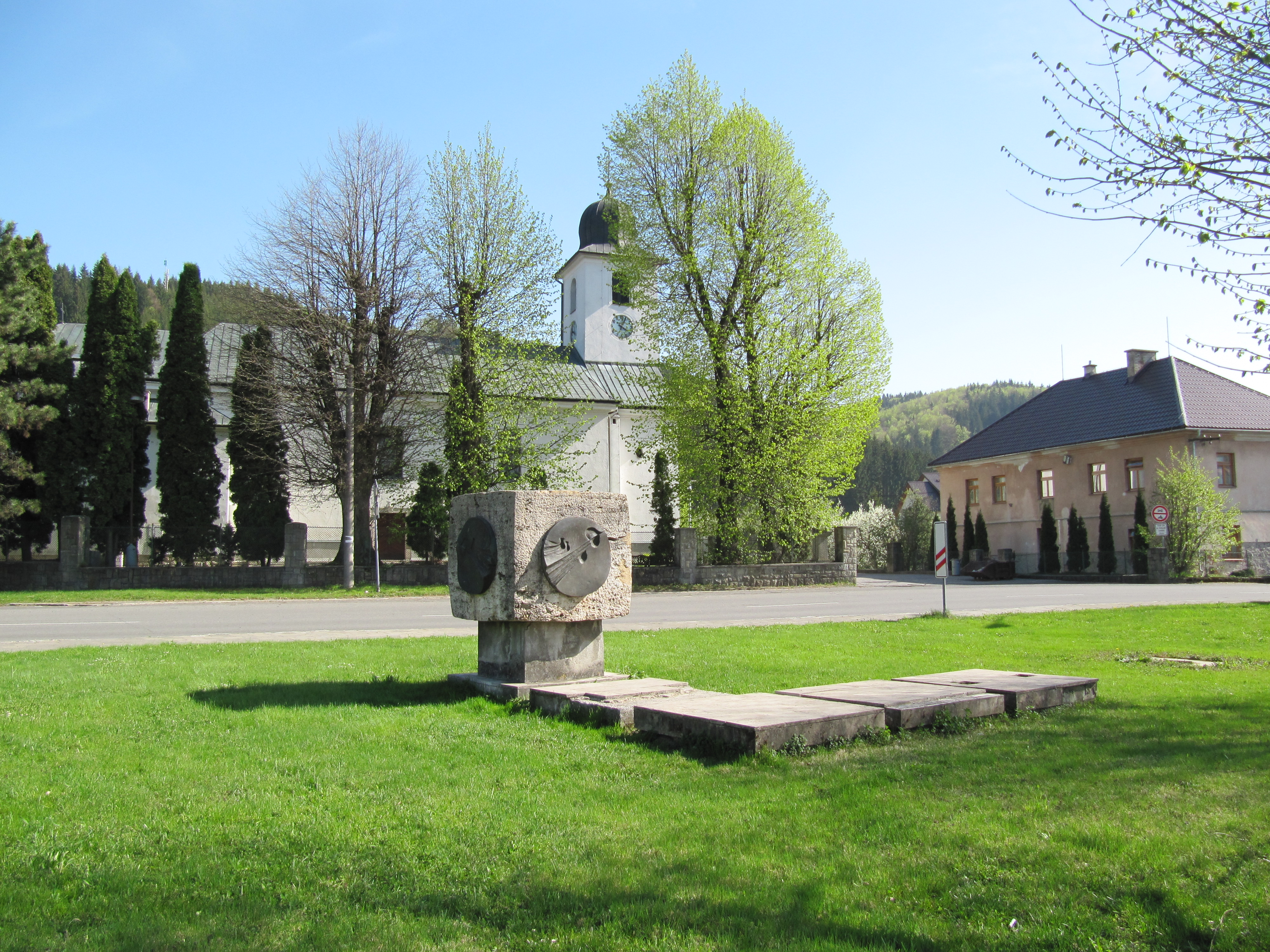
- Centre of Halenkov

- Flag Coat of arms

- Location in the Czech Republic
- Coordinates: 49°19′3″N 18°8′51″E
- Country: Czech Republic
- Region: Zlín
- District: Vsetín
- Founded: 1654

Area
  - Total: 42.21 km^{2} (16.30 sq mi)
- Elevation: 425 m (1,394 ft)

Population (2026-01-01)
  - Total: 2,354
  - Density: 55.77/km^{2} (144.4/sq mi)
- Time zone: UTC+1 (CET)
  - Summer (DST): UTC+2 (CEST)
- Postal code: 756 03
- Website: www.halenkov.cz

Halenkov is a municipality and village in Vsetín District in the Zlín Region of the Czech Republic. It has about 2,400 inhabitants.

== Geography ==
Halenkov is located about 11 kilometres (7 mi) east of Vsetín and 36 km (22 mi) east of Zlín. It briefly borders Slovakia in the south. It lies on the border between the Hostýn-Vsetín Mountains and Maple Mountains. The highest point is the mountain Čerňanská Kyčera at 885 m (2,904 ft) above sea level. The built-up area is situated in the valley of the Vsetínská Bečva River. The whole territory of Halenkov lies in the Beskydy Protected Landscape Area.

== History ==
Halenkov was founded in 1654 by Jiří Illésházy, a Hungarian nobleman who bought the Vsetín estate in 1652. Until the 19th century, it was an agricultural village. In the 19th century, Halenkov weas industrialised. In addition to several smaller factories, one of the Gebrüder Thonet furniture factories was founded here in 1868. The railway was built in 1908.

== Demographics ==
Historical population

Year	Pop.	±%
1869	2,123	—
1880	2,194	+3.3%
1890	2,298	+4.7%
1900	2,287	−0.5%
1910	2,388	+4.4%

Year	Pop.	±%
1921	2,332	−2.3%
1930	2,282	−2.1%
1950	2,257	−1.1%
1961	2,528	+12.0%
1970	2,488	−1.6%

Year	Pop.	±%
1980	2,436	−2.1%
1991	2,445	+0.4%
2001	2,360	−3.5%
2011	2,320	−1.7%
2021	2,316	−0.2%

Source: Censuses

== Transport ==
Halenkov is located on the railway line Vsetín–Velké Karlovice.

== Sights ==
The main landmark of Halenkov is the Church of the Exaltation of the Holy Cross. It was built in 1788.

== Notable people ==
- Karel Korytář (1949–2026), politician
