= Bystricka =

Bystricka may refer to:

- Bystrička, a village and municipality in Slovakia
- Bystřička, a municipality and village in the Czech Republic
