= Vsetínská Bečva =

River in the Czech Republic

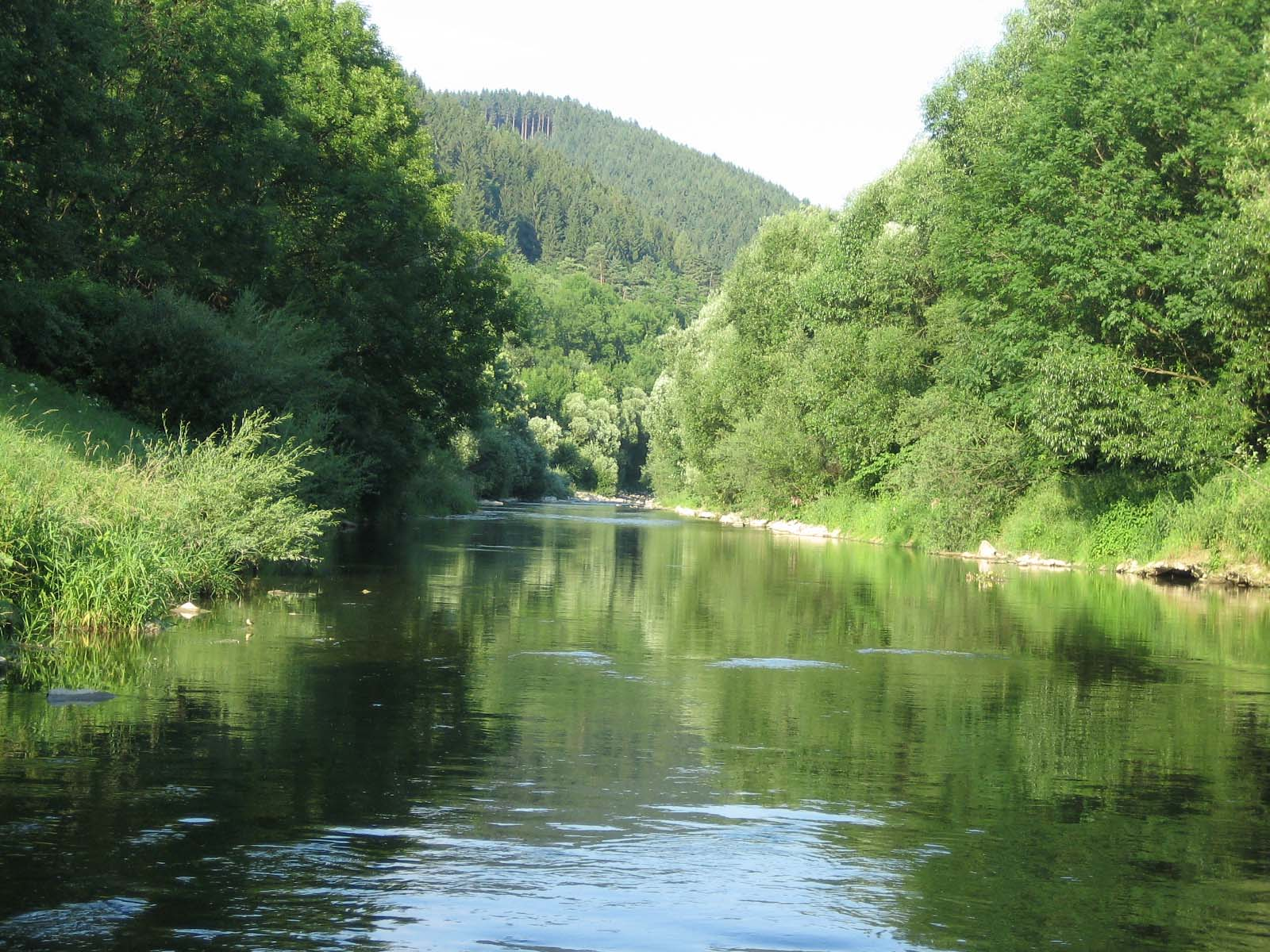
- The Vsetínská Bečva in Janová

Location
- Country: Czech Republic
- Region: Zlín

Physical characteristics
- Source
  - location: Velké Karlovice, Hostýn-Vsetín Mountains
  - coordinates: 49°23′45″N 18°24′10″E
  - elevation: 896 m (2,940 ft)
- Mouth
  - location: Bečva
  - coordinates: 49°28′11″N 17°57′16″E
  - elevation: 285 m (935 ft)
- Length: 59.4 km (36.9 mi)
- Basin size: 734 km^{2} (283 sq mi)
- Discharge
  - average: 9.4 m^{3}/s (330 cu ft/s) near estuary

Basin features
- Progression: Bečva→ Morava→ Danube→ Black Sea

The Vsetínská Bečva (Czech pronunciation: [ˈfsɛciːnskaː ˈbɛtʃva]; also called Horní Bečva; German: Obere Betschwa, Obere Betsch) is a river in the Czech Republic. It flows through the Zlín Region. It is the upper course of the Bečva, but usually it is considered a separate river. Until its confluence with the Rožnovská Bečva, when it further continues as Bečva, the Vsetínská Bečva is 59.4 km (36.9 mi) long.

== Etymology ==
The name Bečva is derived from the old Czech words bek, beč (i.e. 'cry'), meaning 'loud river'. The attribute Vsetínská is derived from the town of Vsetín. The river is also called Horní Bečva ('upper Bečva').

== Characteristic ==
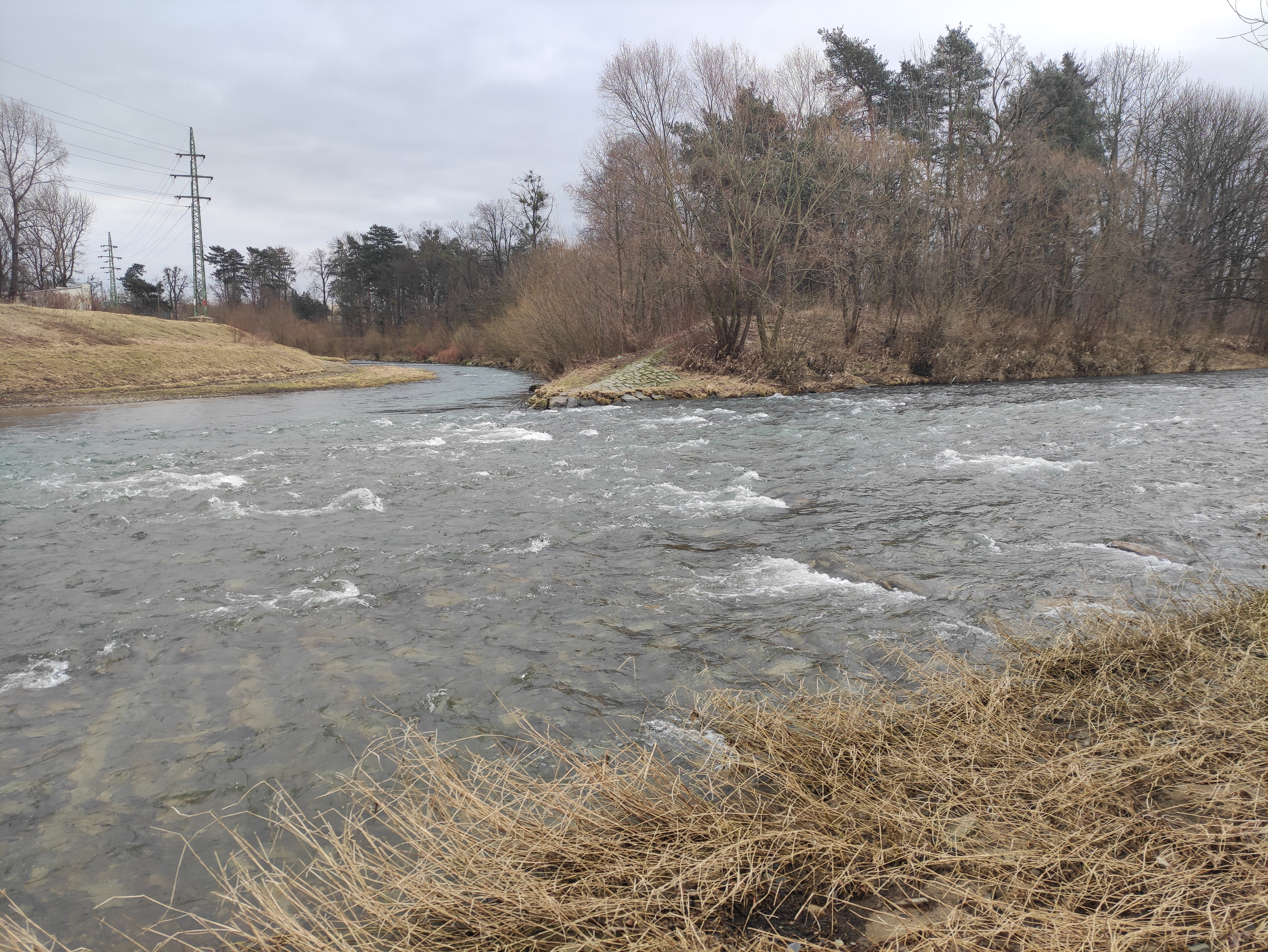
Confluence of the Vsetínská Bečva (right) and Rožnovská Bečva

From a water management point of view, the Bečva and Vsetínská Bečva are two different rivers with separate numbering of river kilometres. The Vsetínská Bečva originates in the territory of Velké Karlovice in the Hostýn-Vsetín Mountains at an elevation of 896 m (2,940 ft) and then flows to Valašské Meziříčí, where it merges with the Rožnovská Bečva River at an elevation of 285 m (935 ft) and continues as Bečva. It is 59.4 km (36.9 mi) long. Its drainage basin has an area of 734 km^{2} (283 sq mi), of which 727.5 km^{2} (280.9 sq mi) is in the Czech Republic.

The longest tributaries of the Vsetínská Bečva are:

Tributary	Length (km)	River km	Side
Senice	32.5	23.3	left
Bystřička	22.2	7.5	right
Rokytenka	13.4	19.4	left
Ratibořka	11.0	14.2	left
Jasenice	8.9	20.6	right
Velká Stanovnice	8.9	44.2	left
Kychová	8.7	32.4	left
Dinotice	8.6	34.4	right

== Course ==
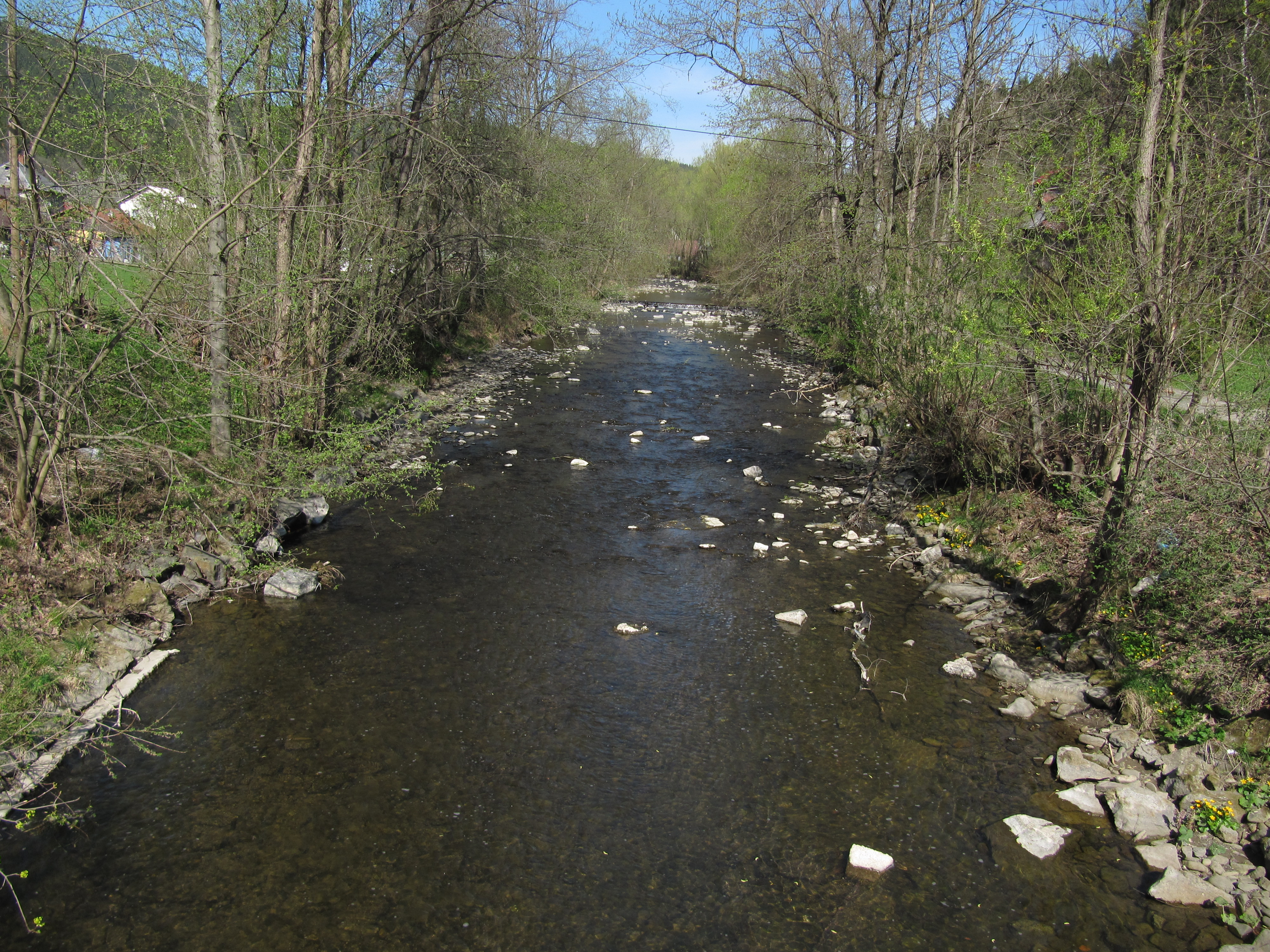
Upper course of the river in Velké Karlovice

The most notable settlement on the river is the town of Vsetín. The river flows through the municipal territories of Velké Karlovice, Karolinka, Nový Hrozenkov, Halenkov, Huslenky, Hovězí, Janová, Ústí, Vsetín, Ratiboř, Pržno, Jablůnka, Mikulůvka, Bystřička, Jarcová and Valašské Meziříčí.

== Bodies of water ==
There are no reservoirs and fishponds built directly on the Vsetínská Bečva. There are 165 bodies of water in the basin area. The largest of them are the Karolinka Reservoir with an area of 44 ha (110 acres) and Bystřička Reservoir with an area of 22 ha (54 acres).

== Tourism ==
The Vsetínská Bečva is suitable for river tourism. About 54 km (34 mi) of the river is navigable. The river is best navigable in spring and after the rains. There are several weirs on the river that are dangerous for paddlers.
