= Jablůnka =

- Municipality
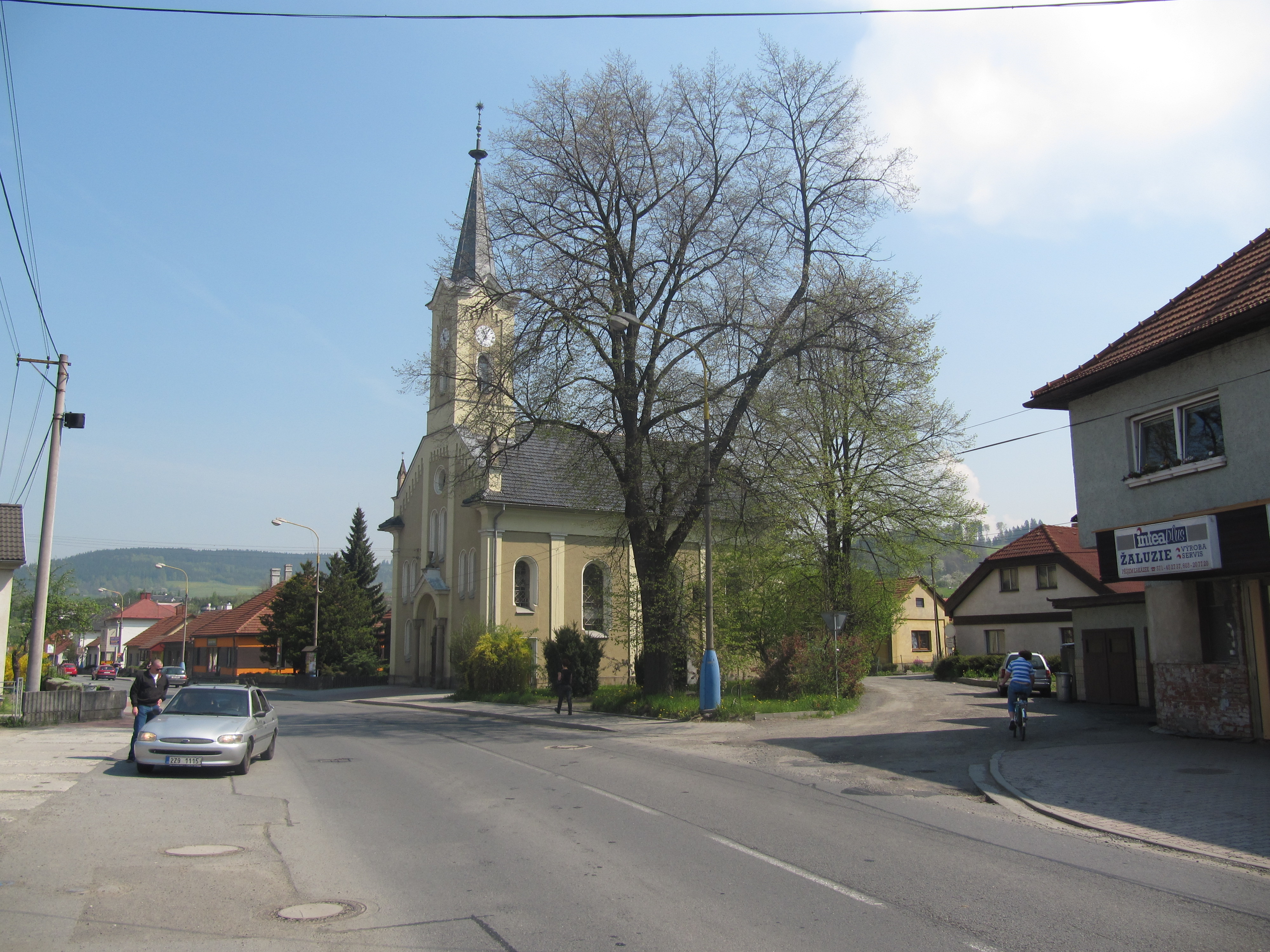
- Evangelical church

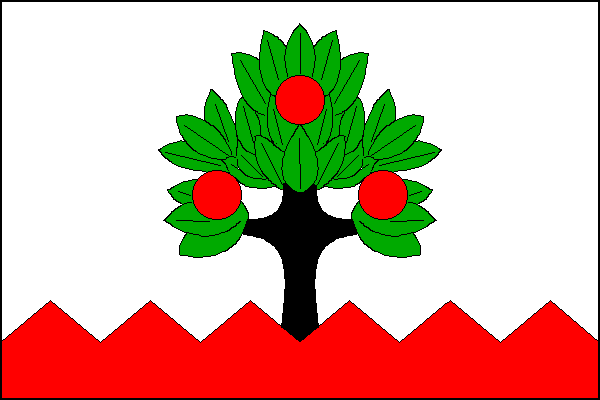
- Flag Coat of arms

- Location in the Czech Republic
- Coordinates: 49°23′0″N 17°57′0″E
- Country: Czech Republic
- Region: Zlín
- District: Vsetín
- First mentioned: 1505

Area
  - Total: 8.21 km^{2} (3.17 sq mi)
- Elevation: 324 m (1,063 ft)

Population (2026-01-01)
  - Total: 2,067
  - Density: 252/km^{2} (652/sq mi)
- Time zone: UTC+1 (CET)
  - Summer (DST): UTC+2 (CEST)
- Postal code: 756 23
- Website: www.jablunka.cz

Jablůnka is a municipality and village in Vsetín District in the Zlín Region of the Czech Republic. It has about 2,100 inhabitants. It lies on the Vsetínská Bečva River in the Hostýn-Vsetín Mountains.

== Etymology ==
The name means 'little apple tree' in Czech.

== Geography ==
Jablůnka is located about 6 kilometres (4 mi) north of Vsetín and 27 km (17 mi) northeast of Zlín. It lies in the Hostýn-Vsetín Mountains. The highest point is at 569 m (1,867 ft) above sea level. The municipality is situated on the right bank of the Vsetínská Bečva River.

== History ==
The first written mention of Jablůnka is from 1505. The village belonged to the Vsetín estate. In 1903, the village was badly damaged by a large fire.

== Demographics ==
Historical population

Year	Pop.	±%
1869	900	—
1880	1,001	+11.2%
1890	1,010	+0.9%
1900	1,098	+8.7%
1910	1,131	+3.0%

Year	Pop.	±%
1921	1,118	−1.1%
1930	1,200	+7.3%
1950	1,330	+10.8%
1961	1,706	+28.3%
1970	1,843	+8.0%

Year	Pop.	±%
1980	1,973	+7.1%
1991	1,919	−2.7%
2001	1,974	+2.9%
2011	1,953	−1.1%
2021	1,948	−0.3%

Source: Censuses

== Transport ==
The I/57 road (the section from Vsetín to Nový Jičín) runs through the municipality.

Jablůnka is located on the railway line Vsetín–Hranice.

== Sights ==
The only protected cultural monument in the municipality is an iron cross from 1771. The main landmark of Jablůnka is the Evangelical church. It was built in 1877. After the church was destroyed by the 1903 fire, it was restored in 1904.
