= Rusava =

- Municipality
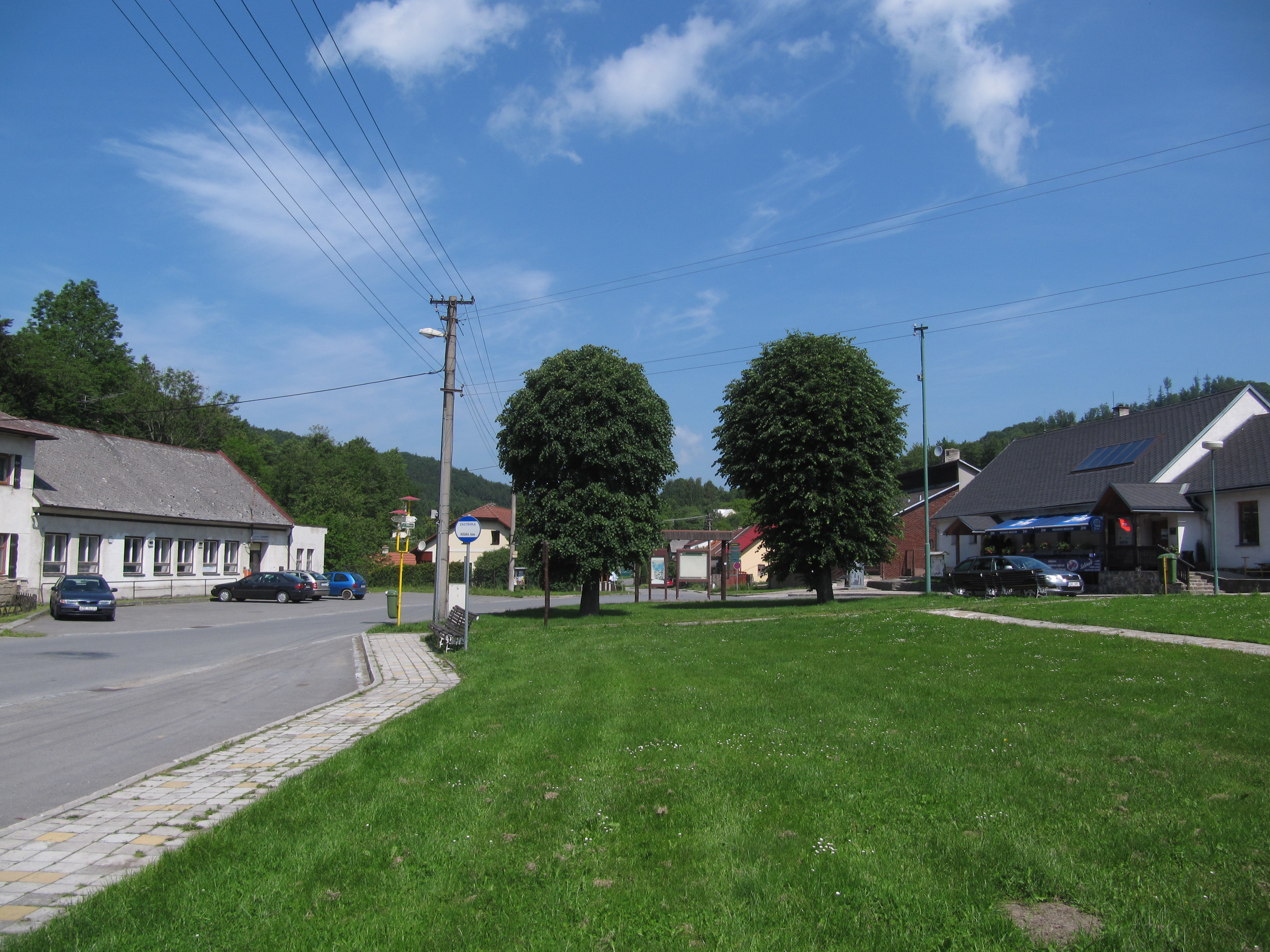
- Crossroads in the centre of Rusava

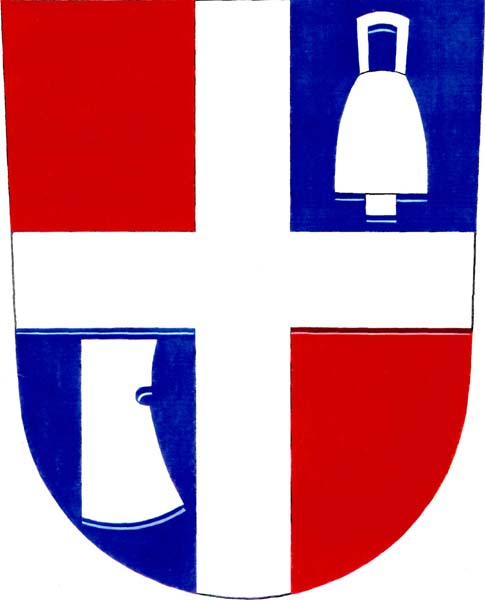
- Flag Coat of arms

- Location in the Czech Republic
- Coordinates: 49°20′54″N 17°41′21″E
- Country: Czech Republic
- Region: Zlín
- District: Kroměříž
- Founded: 1657

Area
  - Total: 12.05 km^{2} (4.65 sq mi)
- Elevation: 410 m (1,350 ft)

Population (2026-01-01)
  - Total: 590
  - Density: 49/km^{2} (130/sq mi)
- Time zone: UTC+1 (CET)
  - Summer (DST): UTC+2 (CEST)
- Postal code: 768 41
- Website: www.rusava.cz

Rusava is a municipality and village in Kroměříž District in the Zlín Region of the Czech Republic. It has about 600 inhabitants.

== Etymology ==
The village was named after the Rusava Stream that flows through it. The name of the stream was derived from the older Czech word rusá, i. e. 'red'. The stream was named after red clay, which turns the water red during rains.

== Geography ==
Rusava is located about 22 kilometres (14 mi) east of Kroměříž and 13 km (8 mi) north of Zlín. It lies in the Hostýn-Vsetín Mountains. The highest point of is the Skalný mountain at 709 m (2,326 ft) above sea level. The municipality is situated at the confluence of the Rusava and Ráztoka streams.

== History ==
Rusava was founded in 1657 by Jan Rottal. Until 1918, it was named Rottalovice after its founder.

== Demographics ==
Historical population

Year	Pop.	±%
1869	1,116	—
1880	1,212	+8.6%
1890	1,153	−4.9%
1900	1,199	+4.0%
1910	1,124	−6.3%

Year	Pop.	±%
1921	991	−11.8%
1930	964	−2.7%
1950	804	−16.6%
1961	826	+2.7%
1970	730	−11.6%

Year	Pop.	±%
1980	634	−13.2%
1991	596	−6.0%
2001	601	+0.8%
2011	596	−0.8%
2021	546	−8.4%

Source: Censuses

== Economy ==
Rusava is known as a recreational centre with several larger recreational facilities and hundreds of holiday cottages.

== Transport ==
There are no railways or major roads passing through the municipality.

== Sport ==
A ski resort with three ski lifts is located in Rusava.

== Sights ==
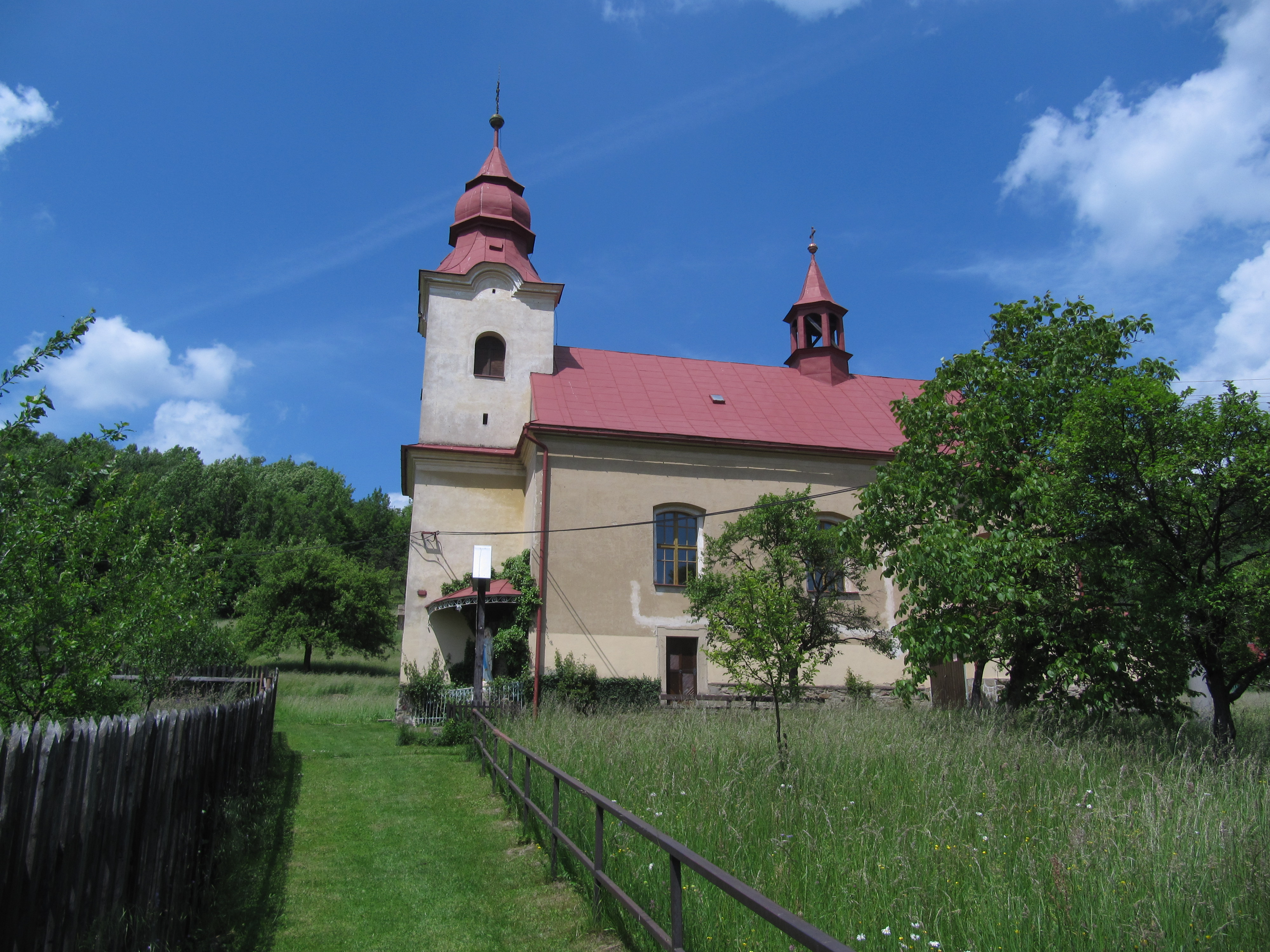
Church of the Exaltation of the Holy Cross

The most valuable monument of Rusava is the Church of the Exaltation of the Holy Cross. It was built in the late Baroque style in 1779.

The second important landmark is the Evangelical Church of the Holy Trinity. It was built in the late Baroque style in 1865–1882. It serves to the Evangelical Church of Czech Brethren.

A museum with the history of the village is located in Rusava.
