= Hubert Pilčík =

Czech serial killer and people smuggler

- Born: 14 October 1891; Nový Hrozenkov, Bohemia, Austria-Hungary
- Died: 9 September 1951 (aged 59); Plzeň, Czechoslovakia
- Cause of death: Suicide

Details
- Victims: 5–"tens"
- Span of crimes: 1948–1951
- Country: Czechoslovakia
- Date apprehended: September 1951

Hubert Pilčík (14 October 1891 – 9 September 1951) was a Czech serial killer. After the Second World War, Pilčík started smuggling people across the border from Czechoslovakia into West Germany. He started killing his customers in 1948, when he was in his fifties. After his capture, Pilčík killed himself in a prison in Plzeň. He was accused of five murders, although the exact number of his victims is unknown. It is possible he killed tens of people.

== Biography ==
Hubert Pilčík was born on 14 October 1891 in Nový Hrozenkov, Bohemia, Austria-Hungary (now the Czech Republic). He went from job to job, ending up in the Škoda Works factory in Plzeň, where he remained until his retirement. His wife, Antonie, was 11 years younger. They had no children.

After the Communist Party came to power in 1948, up to 250,000 people emigrated from Czechoslovakia. Many people used the services of human smugglers to go to West Germany or Austria. On the evening of 6 March 1951, a fire broke out in an abandoned forestry cottage called "Lipovka". Burnt human remains were found the next day. Investigators determined that the body was burnt using accelerants. An autopsy concluded that the remains belonged to a man who was likely to have been burnt alive, but no definite conclusion was reached.

On 20 July, children playing in sand near the village of Senec found a human leg. This led to the discovery of a shallow grave containing the decaying remains of a young woman. She was gagged and had a rope around her neck. Through a specific dental work, the victim was identified as Renata Balleyová, a photographer from Plzeň. Interviews with relatives determined that Balleyová and her father Emanuel were intending to defect from Czechoslovakia. One of her relatives provided letters from Bavaria which "proved" that Balleyová, Emanuel, and his 12-year-old niece were in West Germany. Soon, the investigators focused on Pilčík, then a retiree with a good reputation. Pilčík was known to be a nature-lover and claimed to have been a sailor who survived the sinking of the Titanic in 1912.

Pilčík was considered dangerous; therefore, in September, a special team of police officers entered his home, along with two members of SNB, disguised as electricians, and arrested him. They found four firearms and numerous items in suitcases (from various victims); they also rescued Emanuel's 12-year-old niece. She had been kept by Pilčík in a hidden compartment of a pigsty, where she was belted to a structure that included a double-walled box for her head – to muffle the screaming. The girl was held there for most of the day and was regularly raped. Pilčík also forced her to write letters from "Bavaria". He then delivered the letters and demanded payment for this service in jewellery.

Pilčík killed Emanuel in his sleep at "Lipovka", while the man waited to be smuggled to Bavaria. Balleyová, also planning to defect, was killed less than two weeks later, near Senec. Both victims were killed by baton blows to the head. In his confession, Pilčík stated that he had planned to kill Emanuel's niece, as well as another relative and his wife. However, by that time, he had been imprisoned, and killed himself using two handkerchiefs.

Given the amount of jewellery (the only "currency" of value to emigrants) found in his house, it was believed that Pilčík had killed more people trying to escape the Iron Curtain.

== In popular culture ==
The story of Pilčík was used as a basis for one of the episodes of the TV series Thirty Cases of Major Zeman (30 případů majora Zemana), filmed in 1975. The episode inspired by Pilčík is called "The Beast" ("Bestie").

== See also ==
- List of serial killers by country
- List of serial killers by number of victims
- Václav Mrázek
