= Vítězslav Országh =

Czech weightlifter

Personal information
- Nationality: Czech
- Born: 21 December 1943 (age 81); Nový Hrozenkov, Protectorate of Bohemia and Moravia

Sport
- Sport: Weightlifting

Vítězslav Országh (born 21 December 1943) is a Czech retired weightlifter. He competed in the men's middle heavyweight event at the 1968 Summer Olympics.
