= Janová =

- Municipality
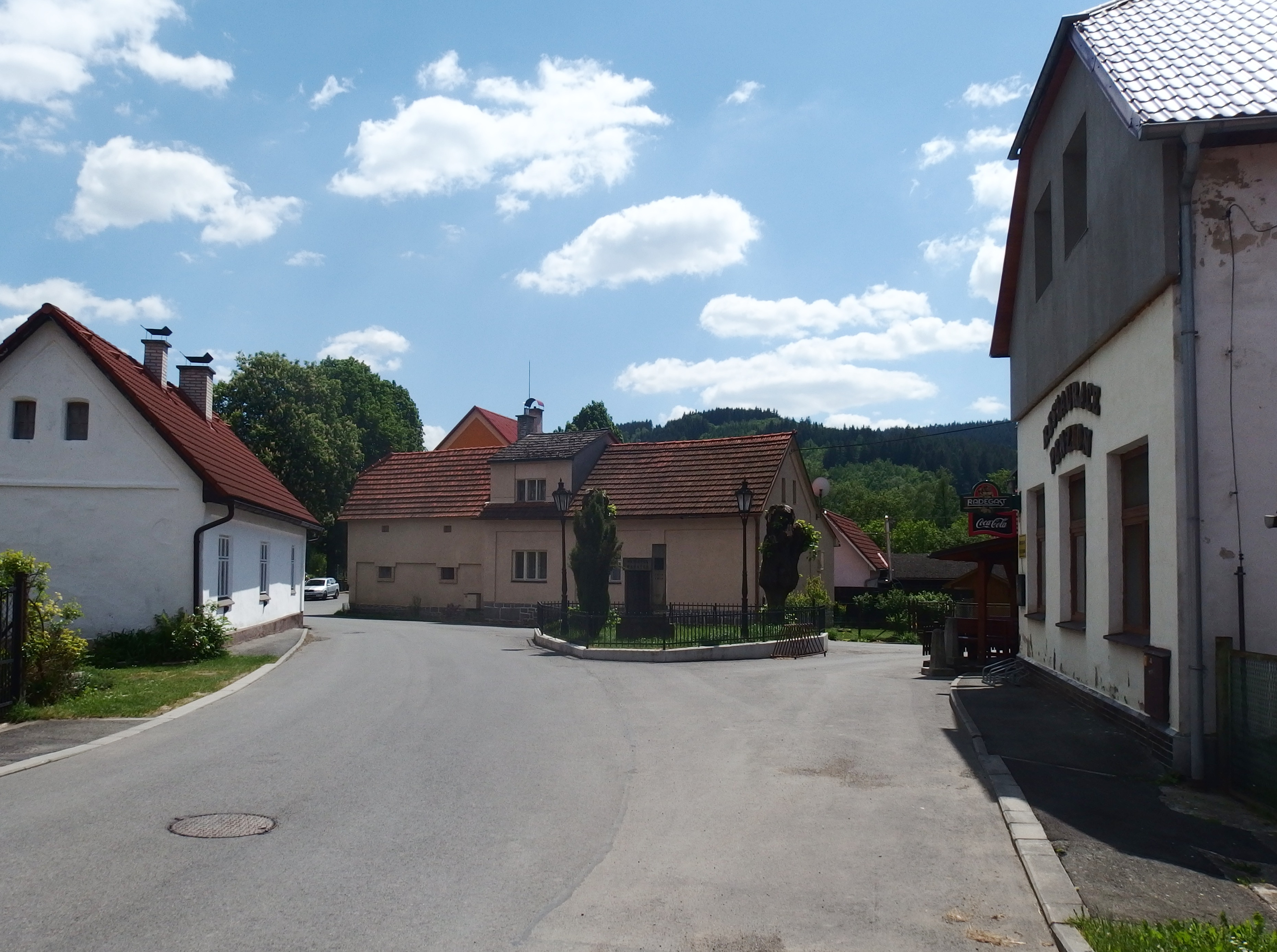
- Centre of Janová

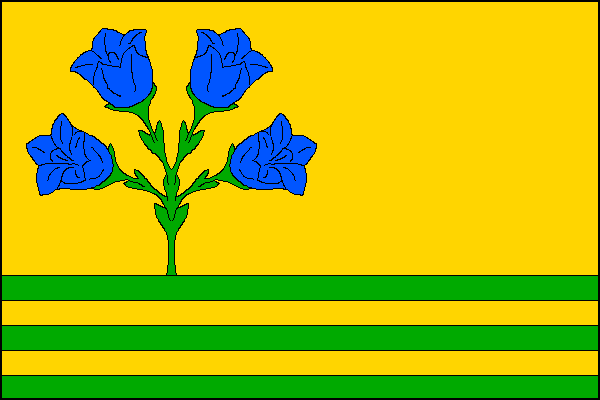
- Flag Coat of arms

- Location in the Czech Republic
- Coordinates: 49°18′43″N 18°1′12″E
- Country: Czech Republic
- Region: Zlín
- District: Vsetín
- First mentioned: 1505

Area
  - Total: 9.21 km^{2} (3.56 sq mi)
- Elevation: 368 m (1,207 ft)

Population (2026-01-01)
  - Total: 757
  - Density: 82.2/km^{2} (213/sq mi)
- Time zone: UTC+1 (CET)
  - Summer (DST): UTC+2 (CEST)
- Postal code: 755 01
- Website: www.janova.cz

Janová (German: Johannesdorf) is a municipality and village in Vsetín District in the Zlín Region of the Czech Republic. It has about 800 inhabitants.

Janová lies on the Vsetínská Bečva, approximately 5 kilometres (3 mi) south-east of Vsetín, 29 km (18 mi) east of Zlín, and 275 km (171 mi) east of Prague.

== Demographics ==
Historical population
Year	Pop.	±%
1869	553	—
1880	547	−1.1%
1890	564	+3.1%
1900	584	+3.5%
1910	653	+11.8%
1921	636	−2.6%
1930	670	+5.3%
1950	708	+5.7%
1961	741	+4.7%
1970	702	−5.3%
1980	652	−7.1%
1991	649	−0.5%
2001	686	+5.7%
2011	744	+8.5%
2021	744	+0.0%
Source: Censuses
