= Senate district 66 – Litovel =

Electoral district in the Czech Republic

66 – Litovel
- inline Senate district of the Czech Republic

- The Litovel district on a map
- Senator: Marek Ošťádal; 24/7
- Region: Olomouc
- District: Olomouc; Šumperk
- Last election: 2026
- Next election: 2032

Senate district 66 – Litovel (formerly Senate district 66 – Olomouc) is an electoral district of the Senate of the Czech Republic, located in parts of the Olomouc and Šumperk districts. Since 2026, the Senator for the district has been Marek Ošťádal of 24/7.

== Senators ==
Year	Senator	Party
1996	Karel Korytář	ČSSD
2002	Vítězslav Vavroušek	ODS
2008	Karel Korytář	ČSSD
2014	Alena Šromová	KDU-ČSL
2020	Marek Ošťádal	STAN
2026	Marek Ošťádal	24/7

== Election results ==
=== 1996 ===
1996 Czech Senate election in Olomouc
Candidate	Party	1st round		2nd round	
Candidate	Party	Votes	%	Votes	%
Karel Korytář	ČSSD	7 884	23.49	16 606	52.45
Vítězslav Vavroušek	ODS	10 922	32.55	15 056	47.55
Ivan Foltýn	KDU-ČSL	5 236	15.60	—	—
Zdeněk Havala	KSČM	5 197	15.49	—	—
Josef Křížek	MSLK_96	2 062	6.14	—	—
Miroslav Kašpárek	NEZ	779	2.32	—	—
Jaroslav Kabilka	SZ	548	1.63	—	—
Jaromír Grumlík	Independent	466	1.39	—	—
Josef Navrátil	DEU	465	1.39	—	—

=== 2002 ===
2002 Czech Senate election in Olomouc
Candidate	Party	1st round		2nd round	
Candidate	Party	Votes	%	Votes	%
Vítězslav Vavroušek	ODS	5 862	26.53	16 401	50.26
Karel Korytář	ČSSD	5 491	24.85	16 228	49.73
Zdeněk Švec	KSČM	3 977	18.00	—	—
Pavel Nováček	OS	2 576	11.65	—	—
Václav Rýznar	SNK	2 230	10.09	—	—
Vladimír Válek	US-DEU	1 957	8.85	—	—

=== 2008 ===
2008 Czech Senate election in Olomouc
Candidate	Party	1st round		2nd round	
Candidate	Party	Votes	%	Votes	%
Karel Korytář	ČSSD	14 109	37.48	20 439	68.28
Vítězslav Vavroušek	ODS	8 730	23.19	9 491	31.71
Jiří Černý	KSČM	6 444	17.12	—	—
Jana Hamplová	NEZ	2 893	7.68	—	—
Ctirad Lolek	NEZ/DEM	2 653	7.04	—	—
Stanislav Pavlík	SZ	1 757	4.66	—	—
Jan Rytíř	SDŽ	1 051	2.79	—	—

=== 2014 ===
2014 Czech Senate election in Olomouc
Candidate	Party	1st round		2nd round	
Candidate	Party	Votes	%	Votes	%
Alena Šromová	KDU-ČSL	9 613	25.05	8 194	53.87
Jan Zahradníček	ANO 2011	9 724	25.34	7 015	46.12
Karel Korytář	ČSSD	7 508	19.56	—	—
Radek Vincour	ODS	4 689	12.21	—	—
Zdeněk Beňo	KSČM	4 420	11.51	—	—
Pavel Foretník	Dawn	2 053	5.35	—	—
Zdenka Wagnerová	Republika	365	0.95	—	—

=== 2020 ===
2020 Czech Senate election in Olomouc
Candidate	Party	1st round		2nd round	
Candidate	Party	Votes	%	Votes	%
Marek Ošťádal	STAN	10 222	26.60	14 006	68.76
Jan Zahradníček	ANO 2011	8 622	22.44	6 362	31.23
František John	KDU-ČSL	7 101	18.48	—	—
Radek Vincour	ODS	6 875	17.89	—	—
Jaroslav Vomáčka	ČSSD	2 648	6.89	—	—
Stanislav Kaláb	SPD	2 206	5.74	—	—
Antonín Baudyš	CESTA	742	1.93	—	—

=== 2026 ===
2026 Czech Senate election in Litovel
Candidate	Party	1st round		2nd round	
Candidate	Party	Votes	%	Votes	%
Marek Ošťádal	24/7	13 544	32,17	13 201	65,42
Martin Škurek	ANO 2011	12 118	28,78	6 975	34,57
Michael Kohajda	KDU-ČSL	11 972	28,44	—	—
Pavel Jelínek	SPD	3 948	9,37	—	—
Zdeněk Beil	The Left	512	1,21	—	—
