= Pržno (Vsetín District) =

- Municipality
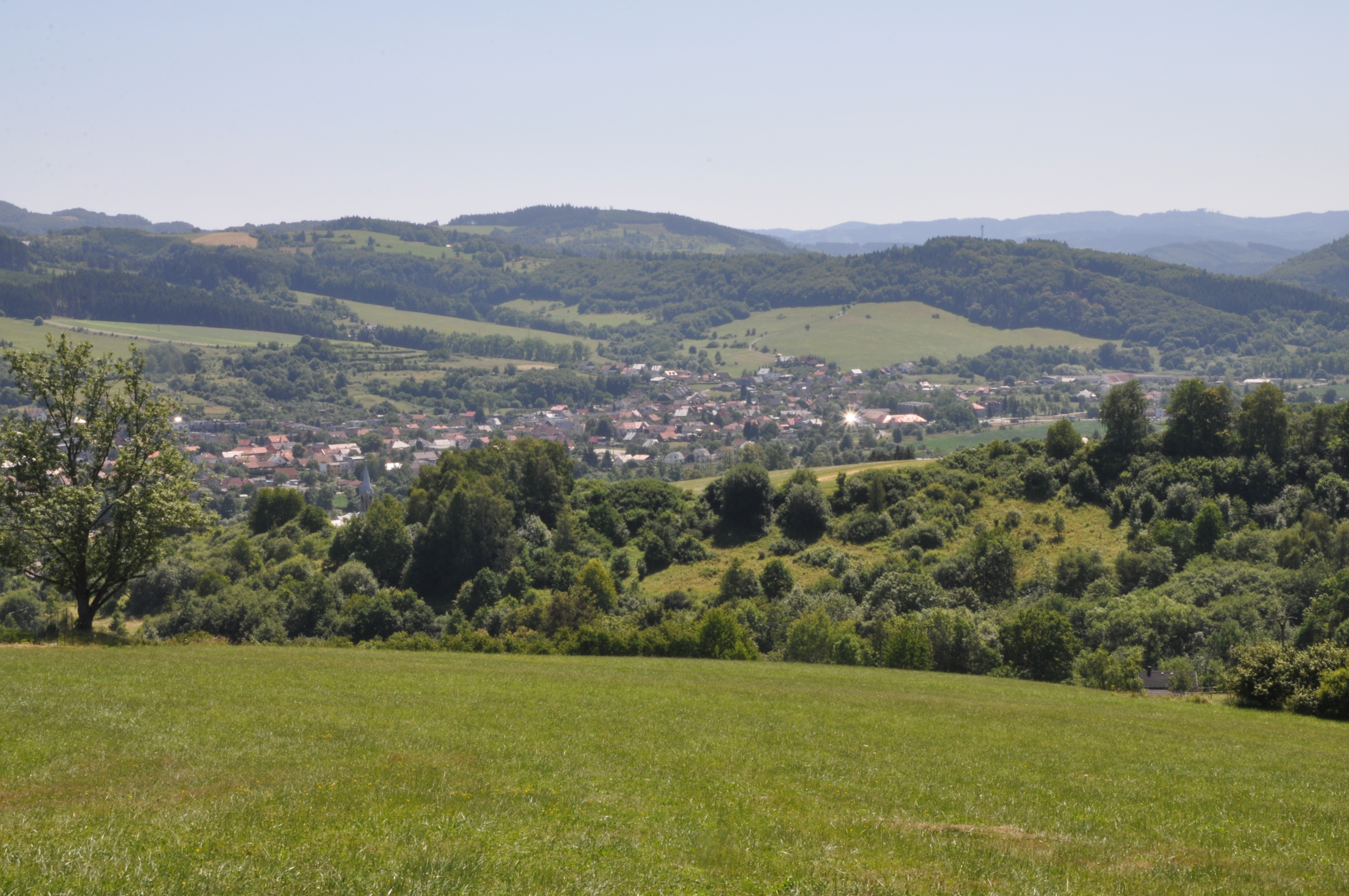
- View from the northwest

- Flag Coat of arms

- Location in the Czech Republic
- Coordinates: 49°23′15″N 17°56′34″E
- Country: Czech Republic
- Region: Zlín
- District: Vsetín
- First mentioned: 1372

Area
  - Total: 8.40 km^{2} (3.24 sq mi)
- Elevation: 330 m (1,080 ft)

Population (2026-01-01)
  - Total: 602
  - Density: 71.7/km^{2} (186/sq mi)
- Time zone: UTC+1 (CET)
  - Summer (DST): UTC+2 (CEST)
- Postal code: 756 23
- Website: www.prznouvsetina.cz

Pržno is a municipality and village in Vsetín District in the Zlín Region of the Czech Republic. It has about 600 inhabitants.

Pržno lies on the Vsetínská Bečva river, approximately 7 kilometres (4 mi) north-west of Vsetín, 27 km (17 mi) north-east of Zlín, and 265 km (165 mi) east of Prague.

== Demographics ==
Historical population
Year	Pop.	±%
1869	792	—
1880	810	+2.3%
1890	853	+5.3%
1900	859	+0.7%
1910	881	+2.6%
1921	864	−1.9%
1930	896	+3.7%
1950	843	−5.9%
1961	872	+3.4%
1970	775	−11.1%
1980	698	−9.9%
1991	637	−8.7%
2001	656	+3.0%
2011	660	+0.6%
2021	643	−2.6%
Source: Censuses
