= Jarcová =

- Municipality
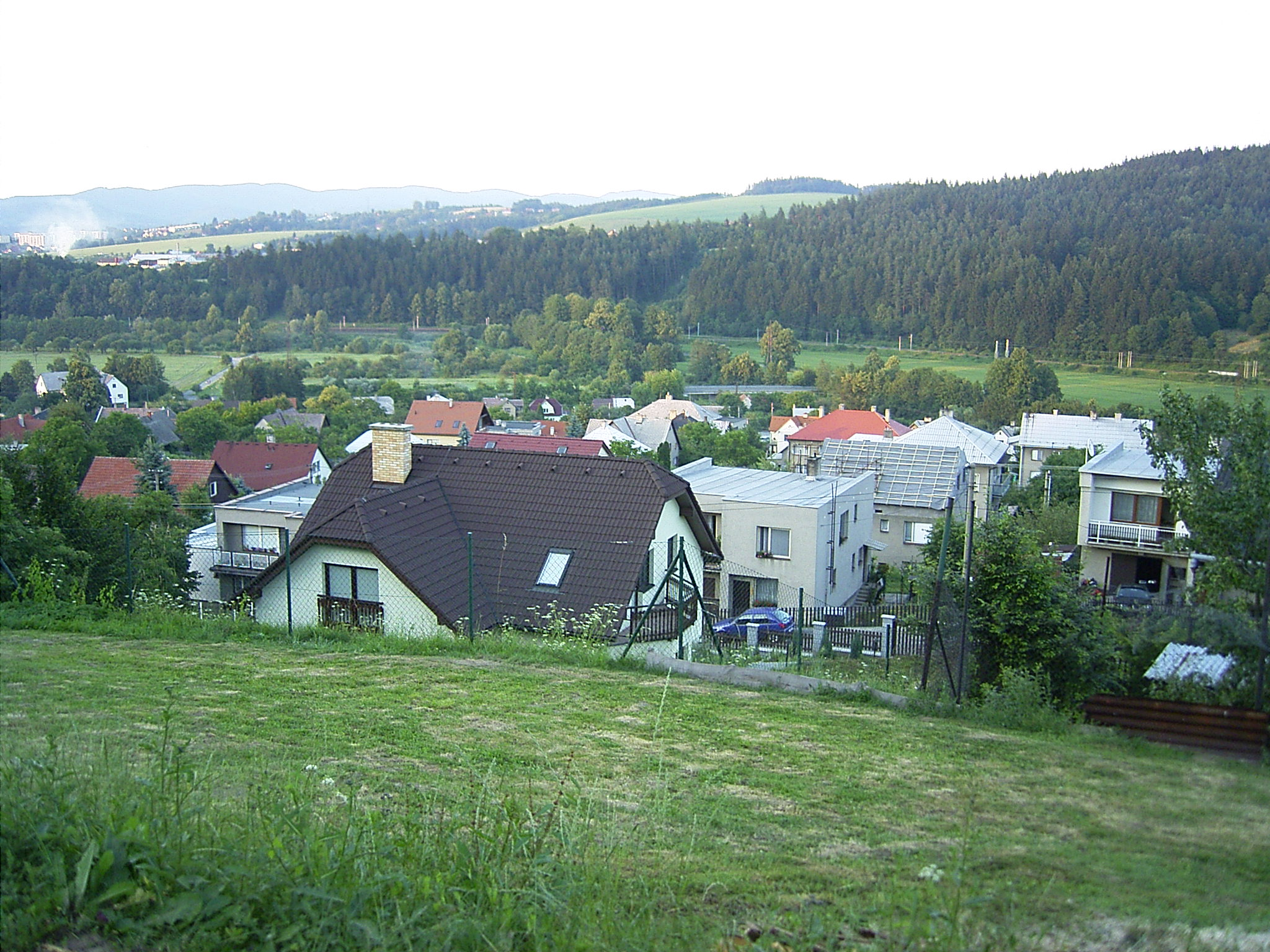
- General view

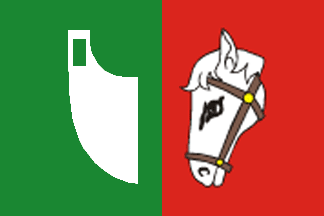
- Flag Coat of arms

- Location in the Czech Republic
- Coordinates: 49°26′40″N 17°57′57″E
- Country: Czech Republic
- Region: Zlín
- District: Vsetín
- First mentioned: 1392

Area
  - Total: 5.21 km^{2} (2.01 sq mi)
- Elevation: 345 m (1,132 ft)

Population (2026-01-01)
  - Total: 848
  - Density: 163/km^{2} (422/sq mi)
- Time zone: UTC+1 (CET)
  - Summer (DST): UTC+2 (CEST)
- Postal code: 757 01
- Website: www.jarcova.cz

Jarcová is a municipality and village in Vsetín District in the Zlín Region of the Czech Republic. It has about 800 inhabitants.

Jarcová lies on the Vsetínská Bečva, approximately 12 kilometres (7 mi) north of Vsetín, 32 km (20 mi) north-east of Zlín, and 265 km (165 mi) east of Prague.

== Demographics ==
Historical population
Year	Pop.	±%
1869	655	—
1880	698	+6.6%
1890	705	+1.0%
1900	762	+8.1%
1910	778	+2.1%
1921	709	−8.9%
1930	829	+16.9%
1950	755	−8.9%
1961	806	+6.8%
1970	767	−4.8%
1980	737	−3.9%
1991	685	−7.1%
2001	745	+8.8%
2011	759	+1.9%
2021	831	+9.5%
Source: Censuses
