= Hovězí =

- Municipality
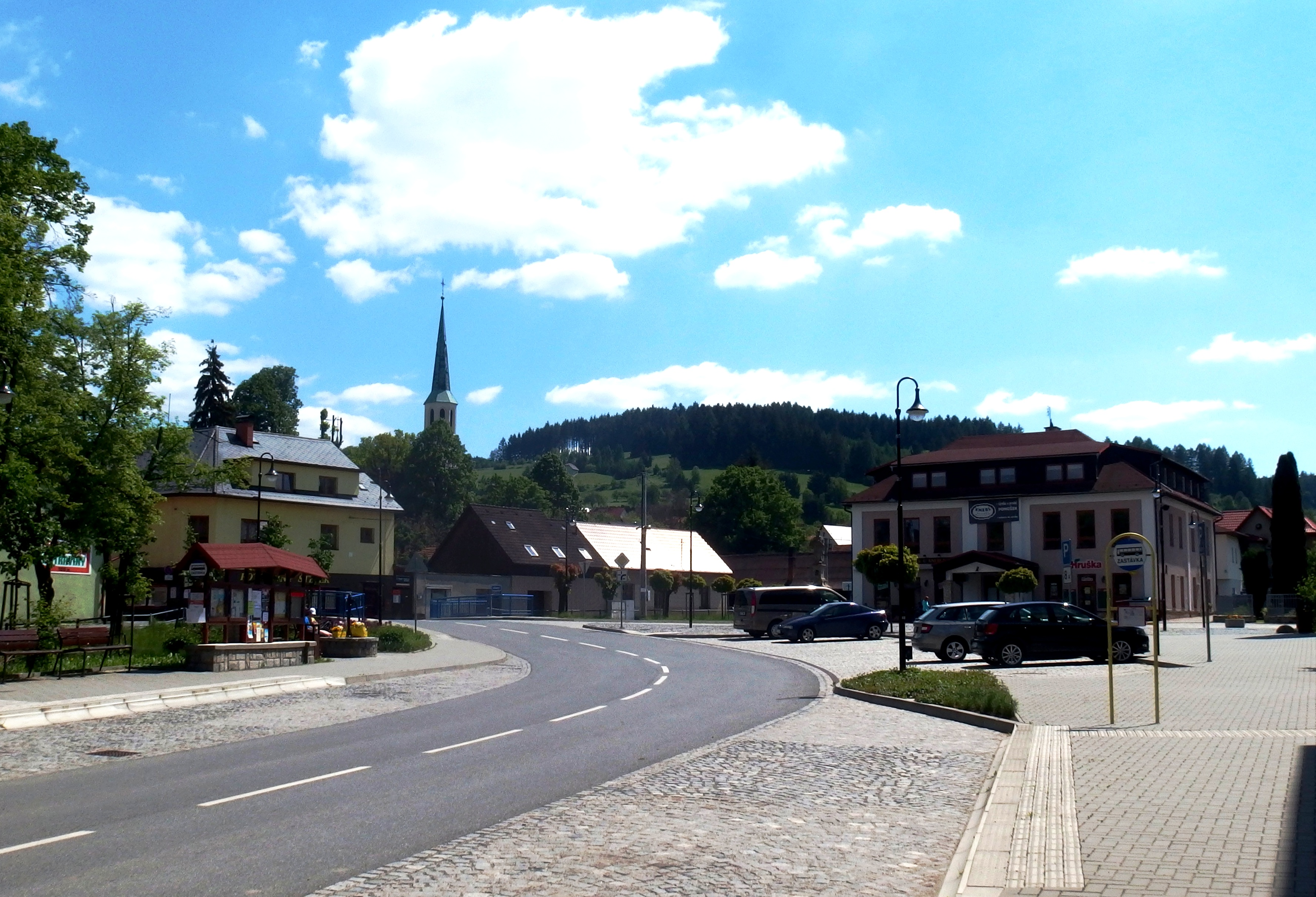
- Centre of Hovězí

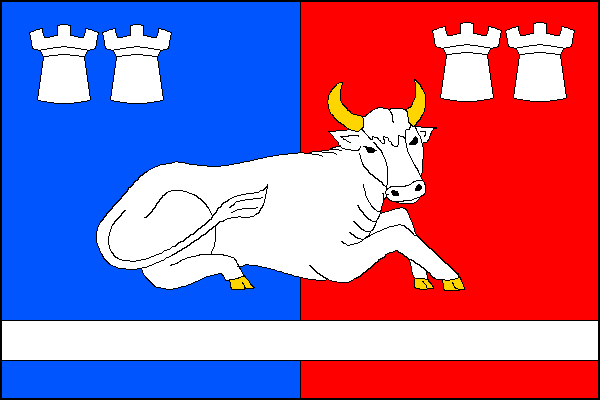
- Flag Coat of arms

- Location in the Czech Republic
- Coordinates: 49°18′13″N 18°3′38″E
- Country: Czech Republic
- Region: Zlín
- District: Vsetín
- First mentioned: 1504

Area
  - Total: 22.13 km^{2} (8.54 sq mi)
- Elevation: 385 m (1,263 ft)

Population (2026-01-01)
  - Total: 2,329
  - Density: 105.2/km^{2} (272.6/sq mi)
- Time zone: UTC+1 (CET)
  - Summer (DST): UTC+2 (CEST)
- Postal code: 756 01
- Website: www.obec-hovezi.cz

Hovězí is a municipality and village in Vsetín District in the Zlín Region of the Czech Republic. It has about 2,300 inhabitants.

== Etymology ==
The name of the municipality literally means 'beef' in Czech.

== Geography ==
Hovězí is located about 6 kilometres (4 mi) southeast of Vsetín and 29 km (18 mi) east of Zlín. It lies on the border between the Maple Mountains and Hostýn-Vsetín Mountains. The highest point is the Filka mountain at 759 m (2,490 ft) above sea level. The Vsetínská Bečva River flows through the municipality. The whole territory of Hovězí lies in the Beskydy Protected Landscape Area.

== History ==
The first written mention of Hovězí is from 1504. The village was founded in the 14th century.

== Demographics ==
Historical population

Year	Pop.	±%
1869	3,246	—
1880	3,273	+0.8%
1890	2,051	−37.3%
1900	1,850	−9.8%
1910	1,747	−5.6%

Year	Pop.	±%
1921	1,710	−2.1%
1930	1,781	+4.2%
1950	1,879	+5.5%
1961	2,230	+18.7%
1970	2,192	−1.7%

Year	Pop.	±%
1980	2,157	−1.6%
1991	2,177	+0.9%
2001	2,312	+6.2%
2011	2,301	−0.5%
2021	2,253	−2.1%

Source: Censuses

== Transport ==
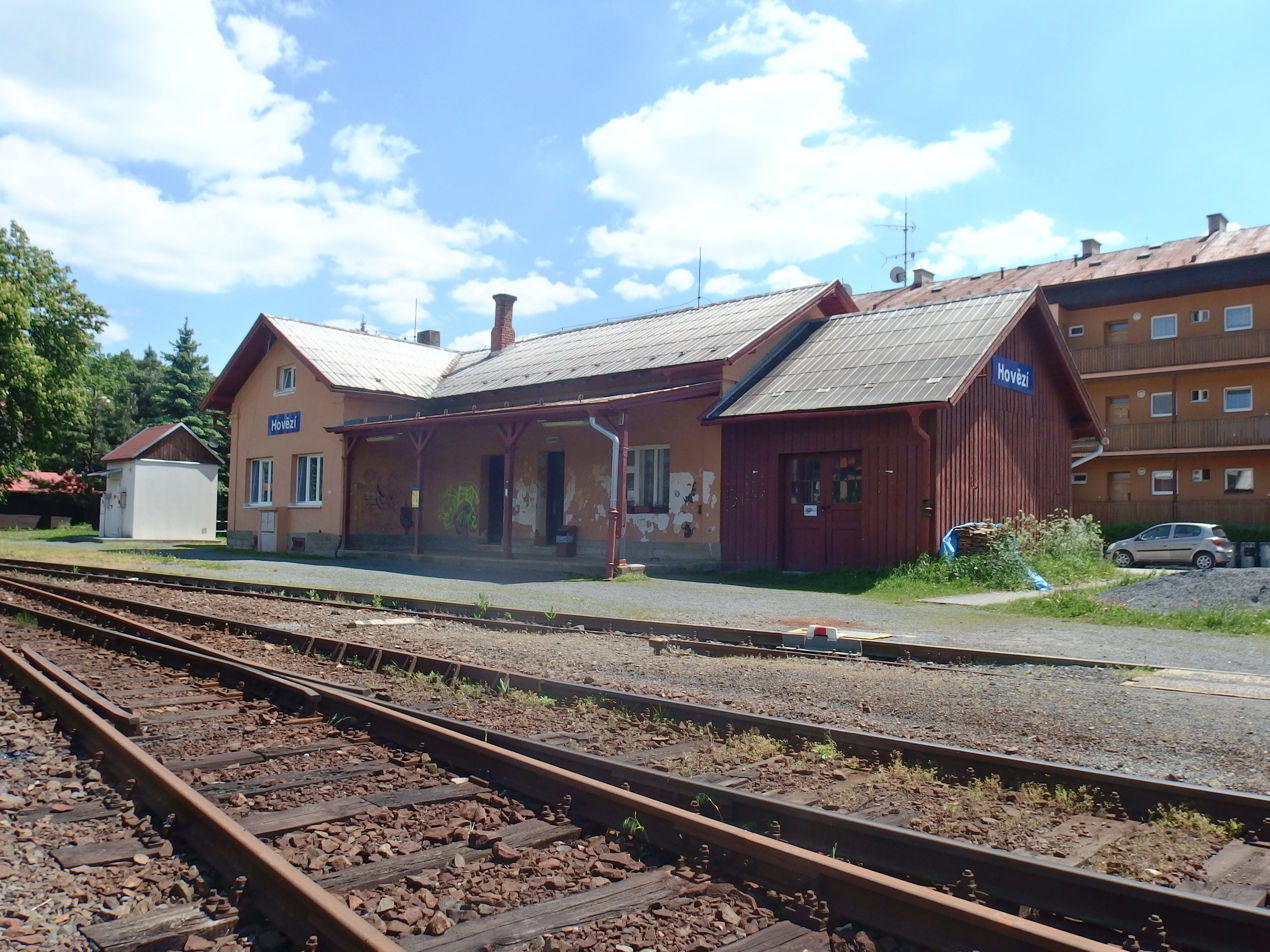
Train station

Hovězí is located on the railway line Vsetín–Velké Karlovice.

== Sights ==
The main landmark of Hovězí is the Church of Saint Mary Magdalene. It was originally a Baroque church built in 1732–1733, rebuilt in the neo-Gothic style in 1890.
