= Vysoká (Hostýn-Vsetín Mountains) =

Mountain in the Czech Republic

Vysoká (German: Hochtann) is a mountain in the Zlín Region and Moravian-Silesian Region of the Czech Republic. It is 1,024 metres (3,360 ft) high and it is the highest mountain of the Hostýn-Vsetín Mountains. It is located at 49°24′14.36″N 18°21′39.98″E.
