= Ústí (Vsetín District) =

- Municipality
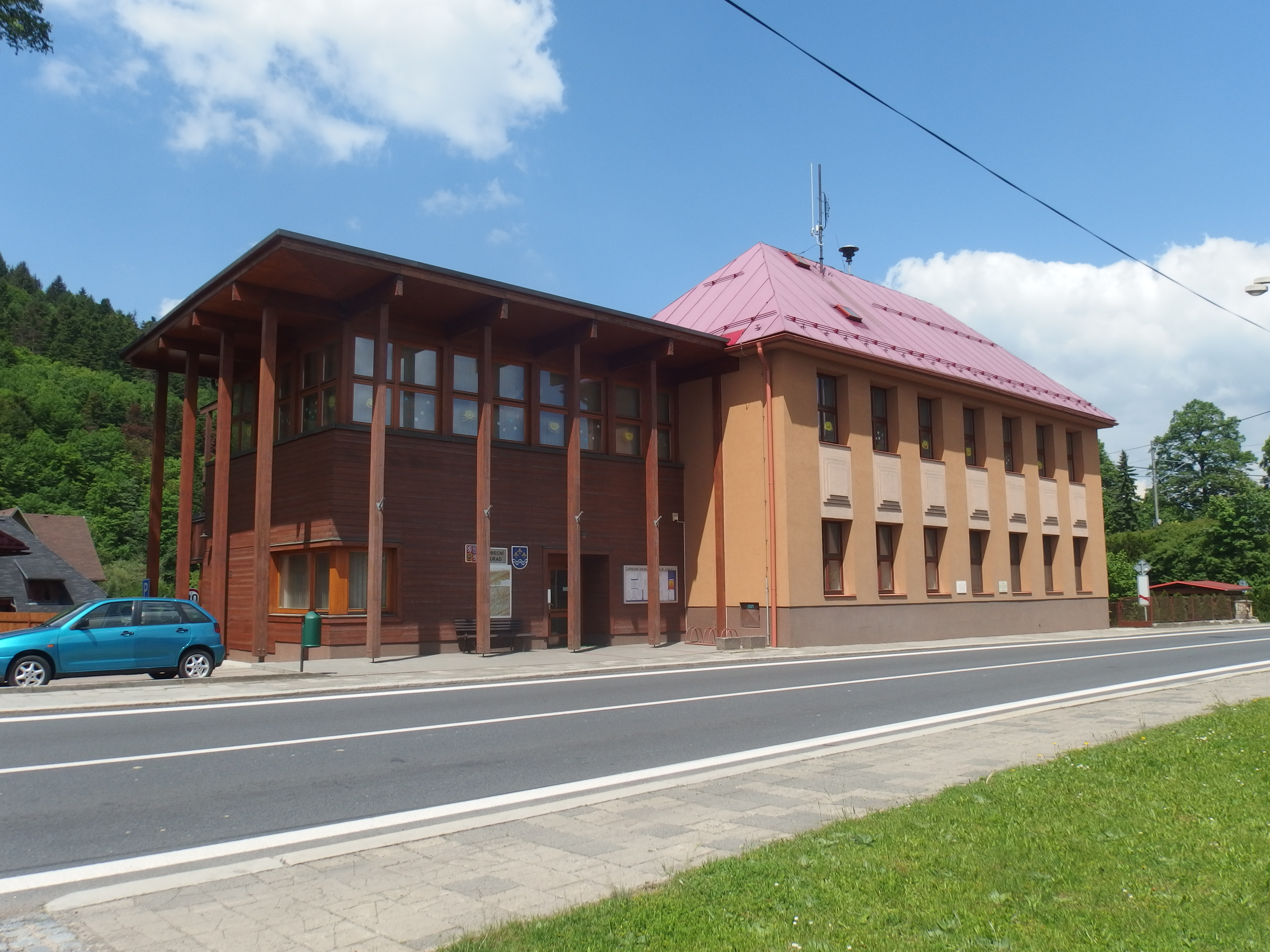
- Municipal office on the main street

- Flag Coat of arms

- Location in the Czech Republic
- Coordinates: 49°18′30″N 18°0′11″E
- Country: Czech Republic
- Region: Zlín
- District: Vsetín
- First mentioned: 1505

Area
  - Total: 5.44 km^{2} (2.10 sq mi)
- Elevation: 360 m (1,180 ft)

Population (2026-01-01)
  - Total: 633
  - Density: 116/km^{2} (301/sq mi)
- Time zone: UTC+1 (CET)
  - Summer (DST): UTC+2 (CEST)
- Postal code: 755 01
- Website: www.obecusti.cz

Ústí is a municipality and village in Vsetín District in the Zlín Region of the Czech Republic. It has about 600 inhabitants.

Ústí lies on the Vsetínská Bečva river, approximately 4 kilometres (2 mi) south of Vsetín, 26 km (16 mi) east of Zlín, and 273 km (170 mi) east of Prague.

== Demographics ==
Historical population
Year	Pop.	±%
1869	379	—
1880	413	+9.0%
1890	416	+0.7%
1900	414	−0.5%
1910	447	+8.0%
1921	474	+6.0%
1930	493	+4.0%
1950	466	−5.5%
1961	544	+16.7%
1970	521	−4.2%
1980	548	+5.2%
1991	542	−1.1%
2001	600	+10.7%
2011	610	+1.7%
2021	577	−5.4%
Source: Censuses
