= Karel Korytář =

Czech politician (1949–2026)

Member of the Senate of the Czech Republic for Olomouc
- In office 25 October 2008 – 25 October 2014
- Preceded by: Vítězslav Vavroušek
- Succeeded by: Alena Šromová
- In office 23 November 1996 – 23 November 2002
- Preceded by: position established
- Succeeded by: Vítězslav Vavroušek

Member of the Chamber of Deputies of the Czech Republic
- In office 3 June 2006 – 25 October 2008

Personal details
- Born: 9 October 1949 Halenkov, Czechoslovakia
- Died: 17 April 2026 (aged 76)
- Party: ČSSD
- Education: Brno University of Technology; Prague University of Economics and Business; VSB – Technical University of Ostrava
- Occupation: Engineer

Karel Korytář (9 October 1949 – 17 April 2026) was a Czech politician. A member of the Czech Social Democratic Party, he served in the Senate from 1996 to 2002 and 2008 to 2014 and in the Chamber of Deputies from 2006 to 2008.

Korytář died on 18 April 2026, at the age of 76. He died on the same day as Jan Krámek, another former senator and MP.
