= Senec (Rakovník District) =

- Municipality
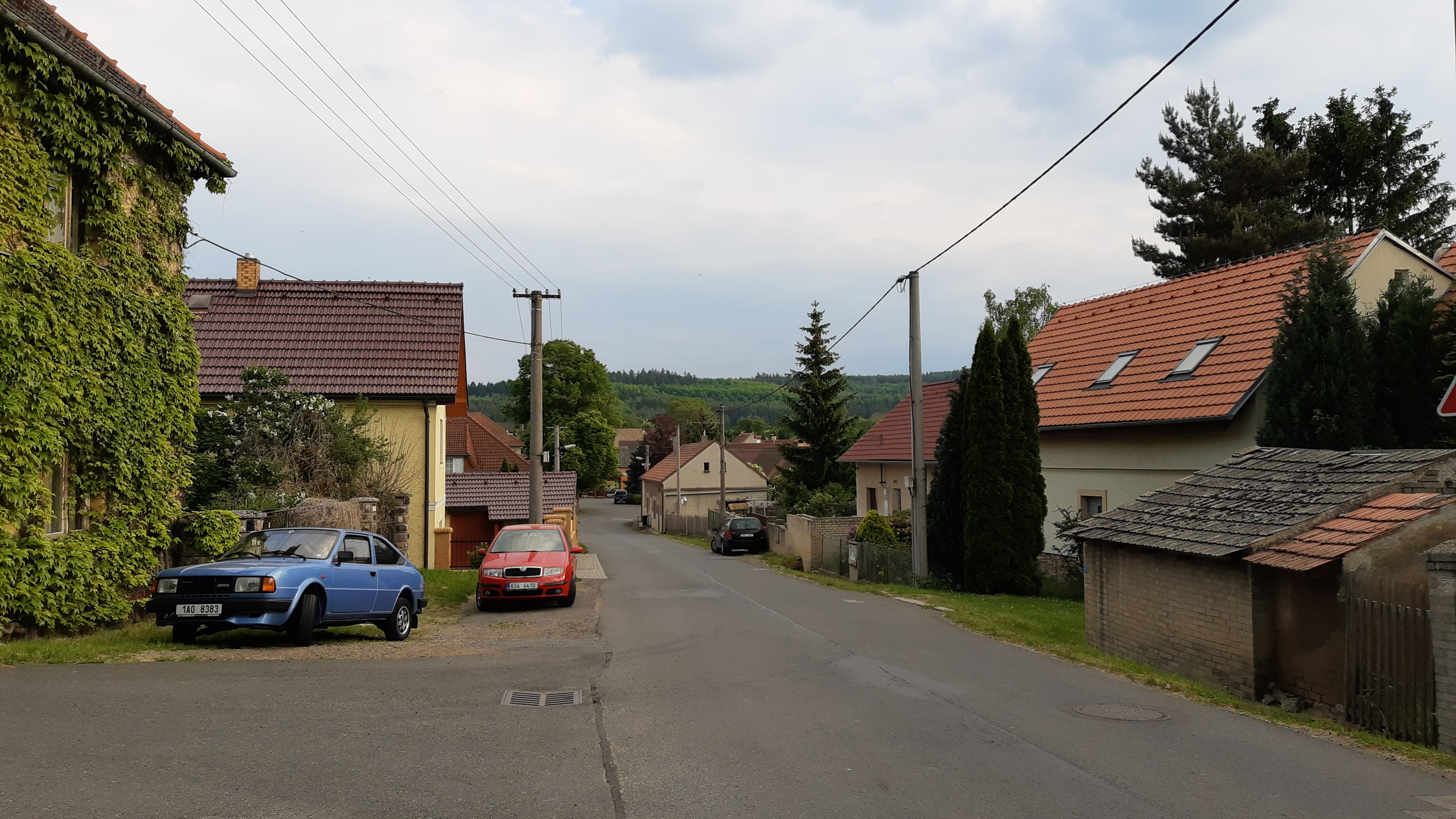
- Main street

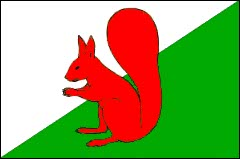
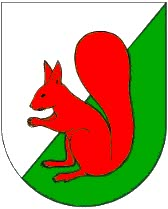
- Flag Coat of arms

- Location in the Czech Republic
- Coordinates: 50°4′0″N 13°42′25″E
- Country: Czech Republic
- Region: Central Bohemian
- District: Rakovník
- First mentioned: 1380

Area
  - Total: 4.40 km^{2} (1.70 sq mi)
- Elevation: 410 m (1,350 ft)

Population (2026-01-01)
  - Total: 273
  - Density: 62.0/km^{2} (161/sq mi)
- Time zone: UTC+1 (CET)
  - Summer (DST): UTC+2 (CEST)
- Postal code: 270 36
- Website: www.senec.cz

Senec is a municipality and village in Rakovník District in the Central Bohemian Region of the Czech Republic. It has about 300 inhabitants.

== Geography ==
Hvozd is located about 4 kilometres (2 mi) south of Rakovník and 45 km (28 mi) west of Prague. It lies on the border between the Rakovník Uplands and Plasy Uplands. The highest point is at 535 m (1,755 ft) above sea level.

== Demographics ==
Historical population
Year	Pop.	±%
1869	491	—
1880	518	+5.5%
1890	529	+2.1%
1900	466	−11.9%
1910	509	+9.2%
1921	524	+2.9%
1930	507	−3.2%
1950	319	−37.1%
1961	315	−1.3%
1970	271	−14.0%
1980	229	−15.5%
1991	188	−17.9%
2001	224	+19.1%
2011	233	+4.0%
2021	239	+2.6%
Source: Censuses
