= Bystřička =

- Municipality
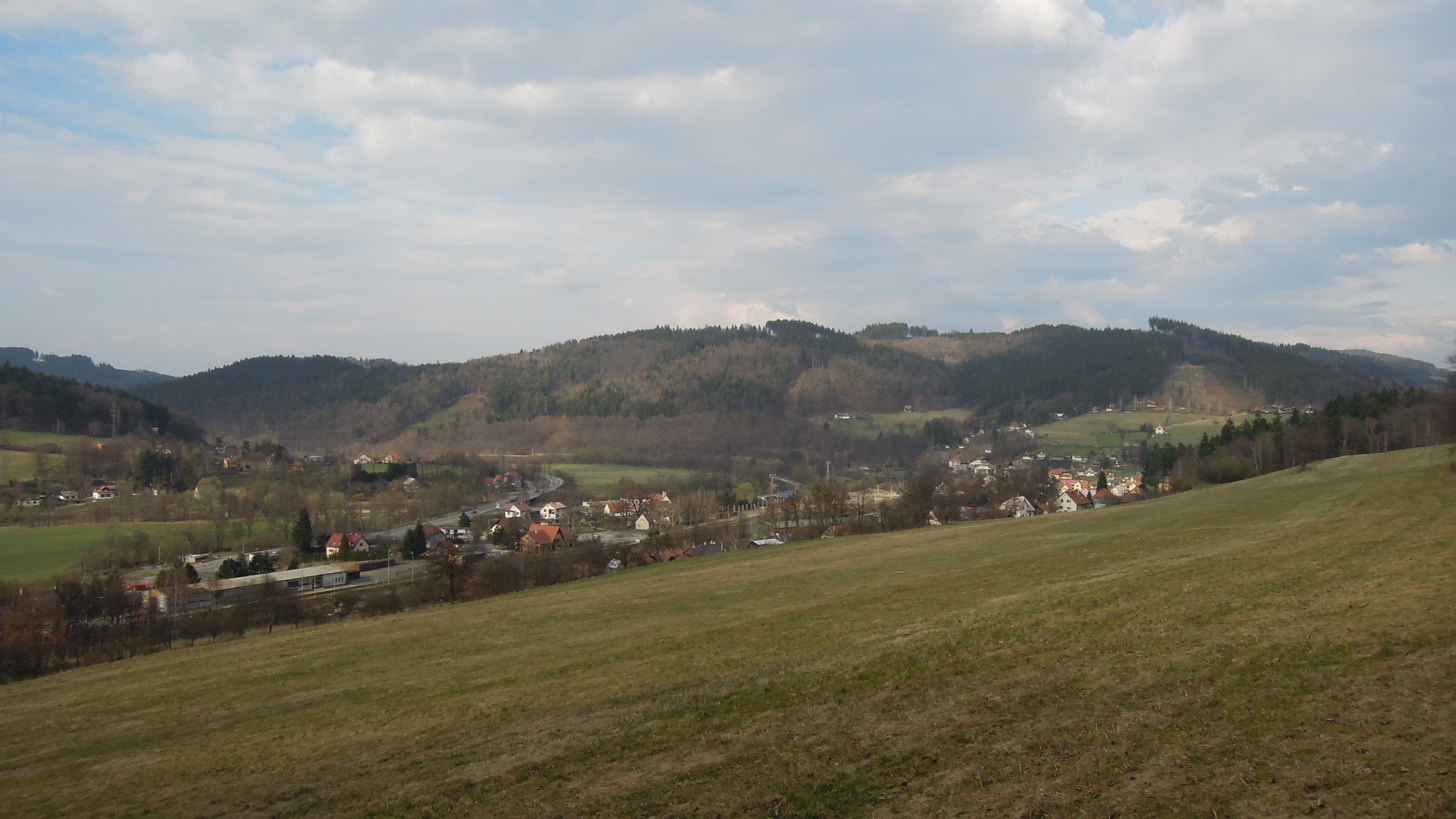
- General view of Bystřička

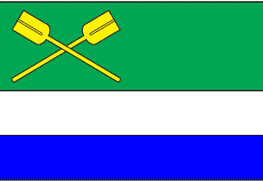
- Flag Coat of arms

- Location in the Czech Republic
- Coordinates: 49°24′55″N 17°58′26″E
- Country: Czech Republic
- Region: Zlín
- District: Vsetín
- First mentioned: 1647

Area
  - Total: 9.51 km^{2} (3.67 sq mi)
- Elevation: 380 m (1,250 ft)

Population (2026-01-01)
  - Total: 1,038
  - Density: 109/km^{2} (283/sq mi)
- Time zone: UTC+1 (CET)
  - Summer (DST): UTC+2 (CEST)
- Postal code: 756 24
- Website: www.bystricka.cz

Bystřička a municipality and village in Vsetín District in the Zlín Region of the Czech Republic. It has about 1,000 inhabitants.

Bystřička lies on the Vsetínská Bečva River, approximately 9 kilometres (6 mi) north of Vsetín, 30 km (19 mi) north-east of Zlín, and 266 km (165 mi) east of Prague.

== Demographics ==
Historical population
Year	Pop.	±%
1869	402	—
1880	429	+6.7%
1890	495	+15.4%
1900	458	−7.5%
1910	532	+16.2%
1921	482	−9.4%
1930	525	+8.9%
1950	508	−3.2%
1961	828	+63.0%
1970	788	−4.8%
1980	940	+19.3%
1991	922	−1.9%
2001	976	+5.9%
2011	956	−2.0%
2021	1,005	+5.1%
Source: Censuses

== Notable people ==
- Linda Nosková (born 2004), tennis player
