= Velké Karlovice =

- Municipality
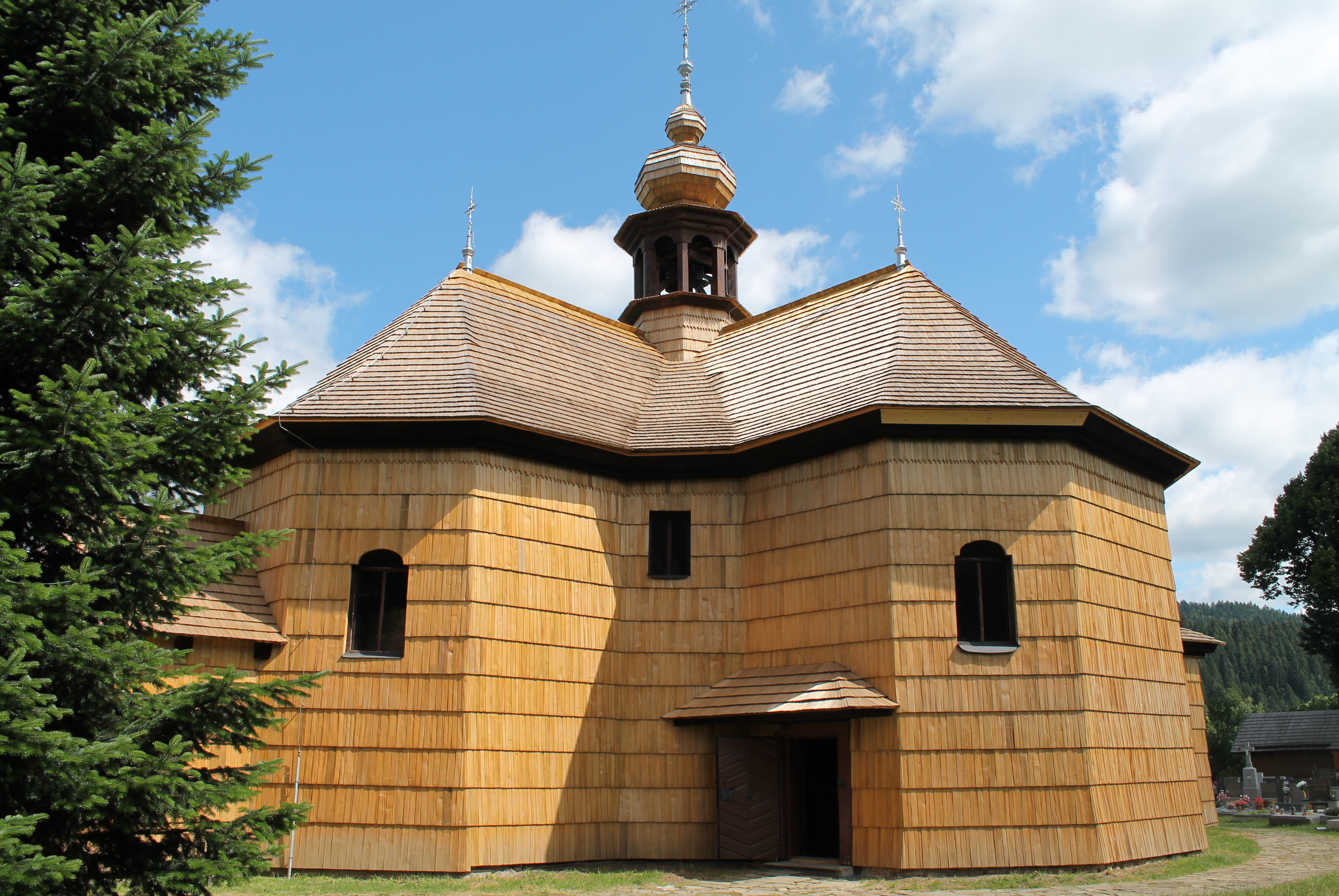
- Church of Our Lady of the Snows

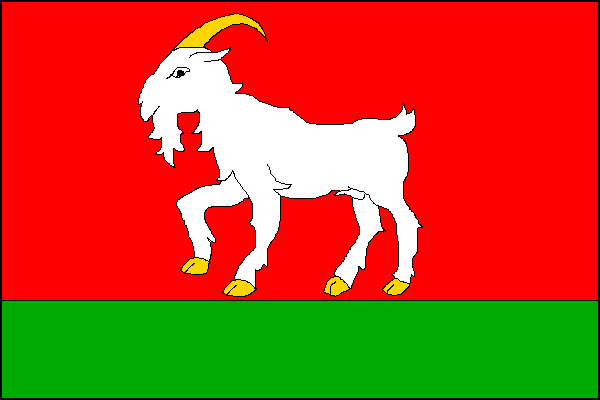
- Flag Coat of arms

- Location in the Czech Republic
- Coordinates: 49°21′38″N 18°17′0″E
- Country: Czech Republic
- Region: Zlín
- District: Vsetín
- Founded: 1714

Area
  - Total: 80.81 km^{2} (31.20 sq mi)
- Elevation: 533 m (1,749 ft)

Population (2026-01-01)
  - Total: 2,342
  - Density: 28.98/km^{2} (75.06/sq mi)
- Time zone: UTC+1 (CET)
  - Summer (DST): UTC+2 (CEST)
- Postal code: 756 06
- Website: www.velkekarlovice.cz

Velké Karlovice is a municipality and village in Vsetín District in the Zlín Region of the Czech Republic. It has about 2,300 inhabitants. The municipality is located on the Vsetínská Bečva River, on the border between the Hostýn-Vsetín Mountains and Maple Mountains.

== Administrative division ==
Velké Karlovice consists of two municipal parts (in brackets population according to the 2021 census):

- Velké Karlovice (2,041)
- Malé Karlovice (172)

== Geography ==
Velké Karlovice is located about 21 kilometres (13 mi) east of Vsetín and 35 km (22 mi) northwest of Žilina in Slovakia. It borders Slovakia in the south and west. It lies on the border between the Hostýn-Vsetín Mountains and Maple Mountains. The highest point is the Vysoká mountain at 1,024 m (3,360 ft) above sea level. Most of the built-up area is situated in the valley of the Vsetínská Bečva River, which originates in the eastern part of the municipal territory. The municipal territory is rich in streams, which are tributaries of the Vsetínská Bečva.

The whole territory of Velké Karlovice lies in the Beskydy Protected Landscape Area. In the western part of the municipal territory is the Razula National Nature Reserve. It has an area of 22.5 ha (56 acres). The reason for the protection is a fir-beech old-growth forest, which is over 170 years old. The area is also an important mycological locality. There are protected species such as junghuhnia fimbriatella, hericium flagellum, hericium coralloides, gloeophyllum abietinum, climacocystis borealis, sparassis nemecii, lentinellus castoreus and oudemansiella mucida.

== History ==
Velké Karlovice was founded by Jindřich of Zierotin in 1714.

== Demographics ==
Historical population

Year	Pop.	±%
1869	4,572	—
1880	4,560	−0.3%
1890	5,110	+12.1%
1900	5,265	+3.0%
1910	5,235	−0.6%

Year	Pop.	±%
1921	5,289	+1.0%
1930	4,855	−8.2%
1950	3,689	−24.0%
1961	3,847	+4.3%
1970	3,313	−13.9%

Year	Pop.	±%
1980	2,991	−9.7%
1991	2,719	−9.1%
2001	2,676	−1.6%
2011	2,482	−7.2%
2021	2,213	−10.8%

Source: Censuses

== Transport ==
There are no major roads passing through the municipality. Velké Karlovice is the starting point and terminus of a railway line Vsetín–Velké Karlovice and served with two stops: Velké Karlovice and Velké Karlovice zastávka.

== Sights ==
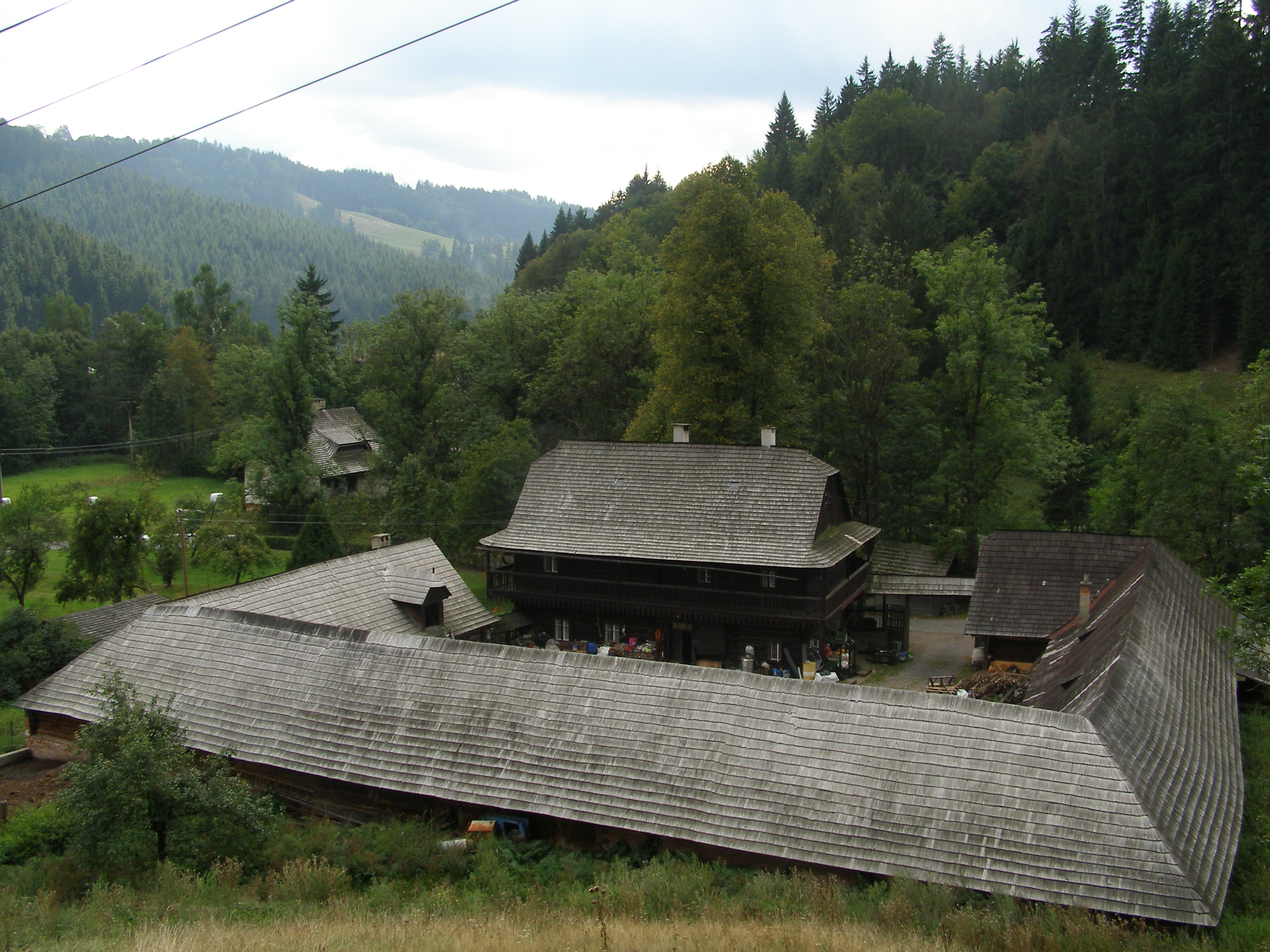
Fojtství

The most important monument, protected as a national cultural monument, is Fojství ("advocatus' residence"). It is a wooden folk-architecture complex of buildings, dating from 1793. The complex consists of two outbuildings, a house and a gate.

A notable landmark is the Church of Our Lady of the Snows. It is a wooden folk-architecture building from 1754. Next to the church is a stone crucifix from 1819.

The local area called Podťaté, located around the stream Podťatý potok, is protected as a village monument zone. It consists of well-preserved scattered houses of Carpathian folk architecture.

A cultural monument is the wooden house from the end 18th century, which today houses the local museum.

== Notable people ==
- Svatoslav Galík (1938–2019), orienteer and hotelier; lived and died here
