= Hostýn-Vsetín Mountains =

Mountain range in the Czech Republic

- Hostýnsko-vsetínská hornatina
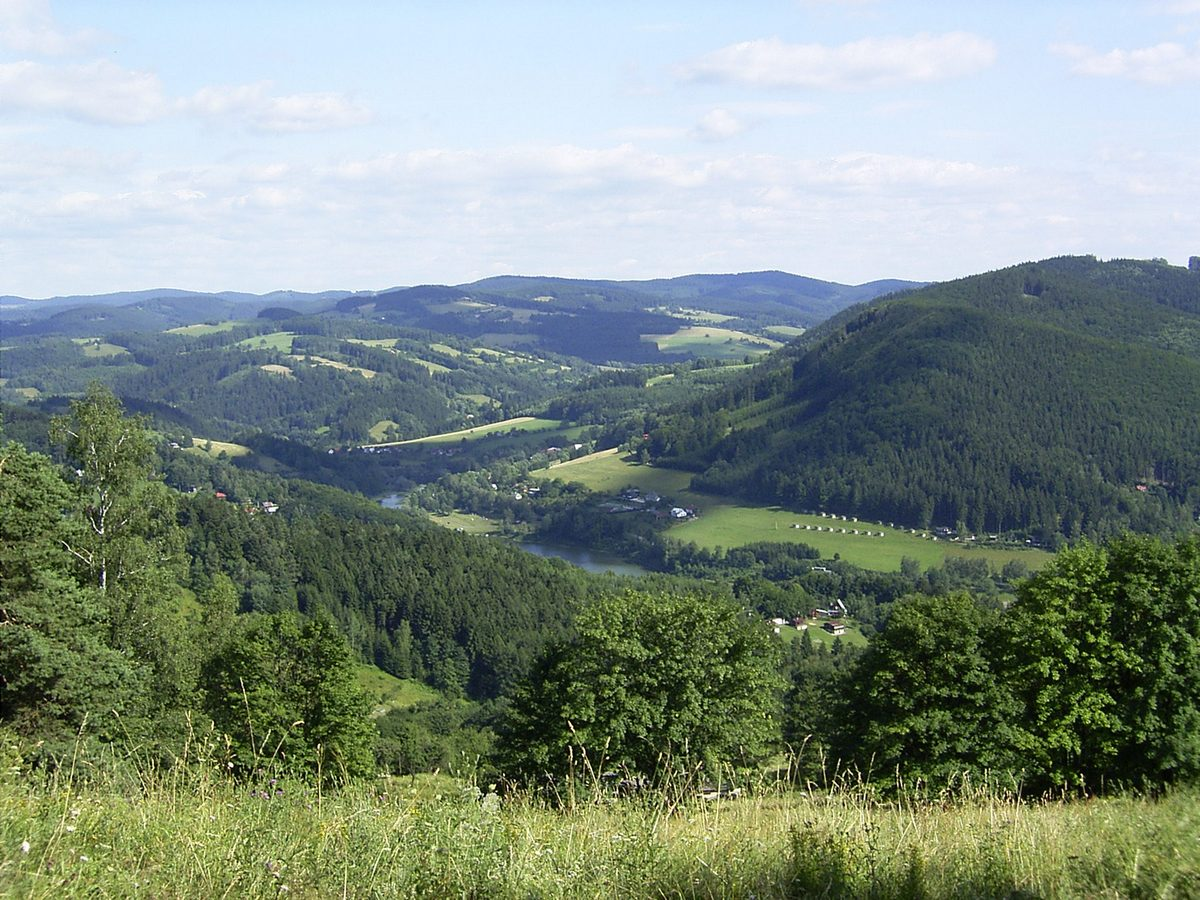
- Vsetínské vrchy with the Klenov massif on the right and Bystřička Dam on the left

Highest point
- Peak: Vysoká
- Elevation: 1,024 m (3,360 ft)
- Coordinates: 49°24′14″N 18°21′40″E

Dimensions
- Width: 55 km (34 mi) West-East

Geography
- Location within Czech Republic
- Country: Czech Republic
- Region: Zlín Region
- Subdivisions: Hostýnské vrchy and Vsetínské vrchy
- Parent range: Western Carpathians

Geology
- Rock type: flysch

Hostýn-Vsetín Mountains (Czech: Hostýnsko-vsetínská hornatina) is a mountain range in the Zlín Region of the Czech Republic.

The mountains are densely forested mainly by secondary spruce plantations. Most visited are the bordering Rožnovská Bečva river valley in the north (with Valašské Meziříčí and Rožnov pod Radhoštěm towns and Dolní, Prostřední and Horní (i.e. Lower, Middle and Upper) Bečva resorts) and the southern Vsetínská Bečva river valley starting in the town of Vsetín with the resort of Velké Karlovice.

The Hostýn-Vsetín Mountains are part of the Western Carpathians, it is divided by the Bečva River valley into the lower western Hostýnské vrchy and the higher eastern Vsetínské vrchy which are a part of the Beskydy Landscape Protected Area. They are built mainly of flysch deposits and their high sediments in both Bečva rivers valleys. The flysch slopes are rather unstable and thus small landslides are typical for this area. The highest point is Vysoká (i.e. High Mountain), at 1,024 m (3,360 ft), in the easternmost part of the range.

== Resources ==
- Rohlík, Jiří (2001). Moravskoslezské Beskydy, Soubor turistických map 1:50 000. Prague: TRASA, s.r.o. ISBN 80-85999-29-3.
- Ludvík, Marcel (1987). Beskydy, Turistický průvodce ČSSR. Prague: Olympia. 27-031-87.
