= Vařákovy Paseky =

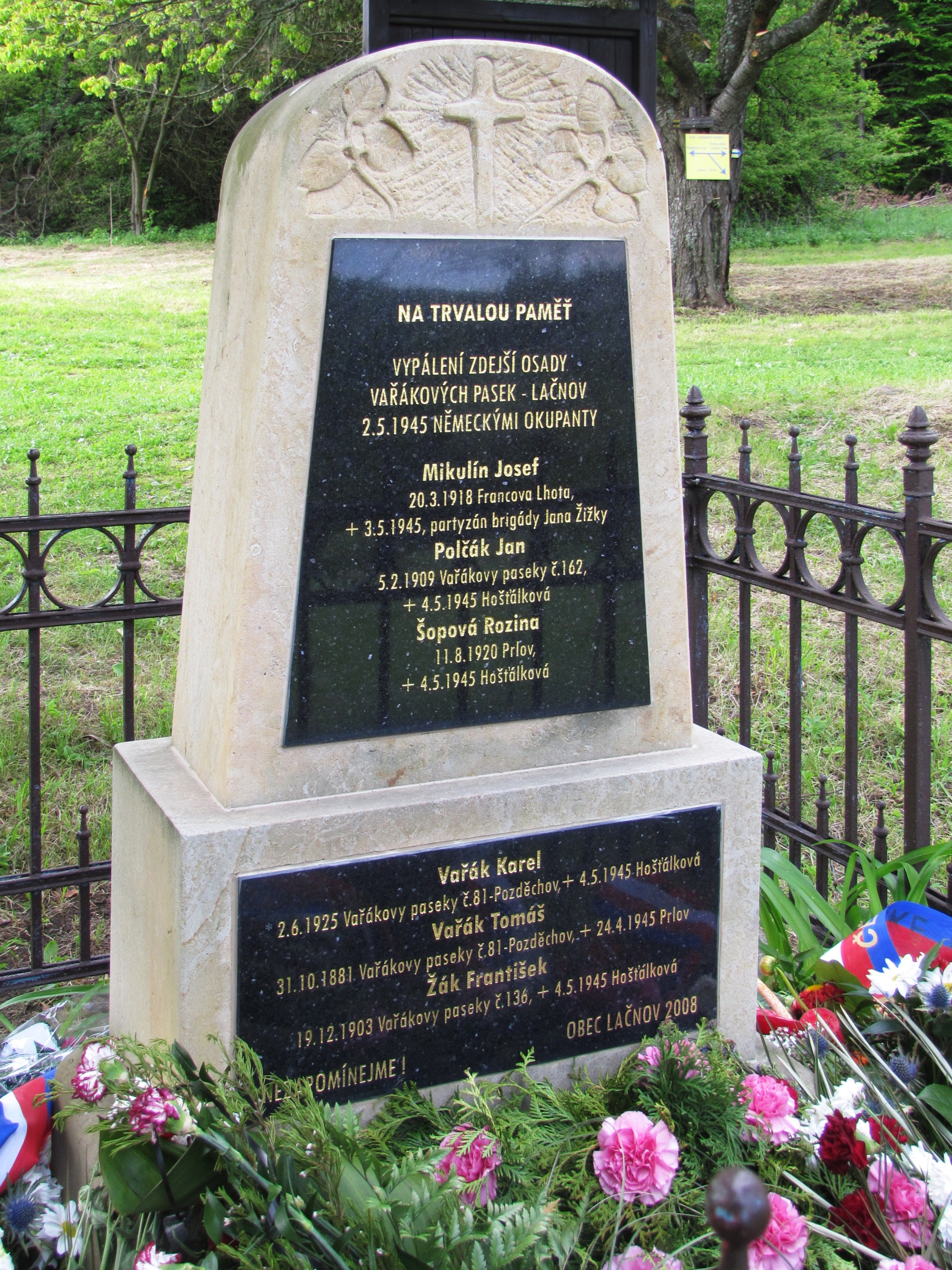
Memorial of Vařákovy Paseky

Vařákovy Paseky was a settlement in what is today the Lačnov municipality in Vsetín District in the Zlín Region of the Czech Republic. At end of World War II, it was burned down by Nazis and several of its inhabitants were massacred.

== Early history ==
Vařákovy Paseky was first settled in the mid-19th century. The first cottage, numbered 81, was built by Jiří Hrabina from Lačnov and his wife Kateřina. It was constructed on cadastral land belonging to Pozděchov, on property owned by Jiří Hrabina's father-in-law, Jan Zvonek, the miller of Lačnov. After 1870, the first wooden cottage numbered 103 within the cadastral territory of Lačnov was built by Martin Vařák, born Hrabina, the son of Martin Vařák from Pozděchov and his wife Anna, née Hrabinová. After the death of Anna's parents, cottage number 81 was purchased by Martin Vařák's brother, Tomáš. By the 1940s, ten cottages had already been built in Vařákovy Paseky.

== World War II events ==
On 27 April, the Ploština partisan detachment ambushed a German unit near Vařákovy Paseky. During the attack, the partisans destroyed two cars, one truck, a field transmitter, and a meteorological station. Three German soldiers were also killed in the clash.

At the end of World War II, the area of the Vizovice Highlands served as a retreat route for the German army as it withdrew before the advancing Royal Romanian Army and Red Army. On 1 May the liberation forces broke through the defenses at the Moravian–Slovak border in the Lysá and Vlára passes and continued toward Vizovice and Zlín.

Beginning on 1 May, the Romanian army led an advance from Horní Lideč toward Valašské Klobouky, Vlachovice, Haluzice, and Loučka. Due to the location of Vařákovy Paseky, the German army constructed observation posts with radio transmitters on the surrounding mountain heights to coordinate artillery fire. In the morning hours of 2 May 1945, four soldiers from the artillery regiment of the 153rd Wehrmacht Division, commanded by General Karl Edelmann, arrived at Vařákovy Paseky. Two radio operators set up a transmitter in the home of Františka Vařáková (house no. 81) and asked her to show them the view toward Lačnov, Tichov, Drnovice, and Vysoké Pole. Two other soldiers went to build an observation post at a nearby triangulation point in Pulcov.

At that time, members of the 1st Czechoslovak Partisan Brigade of Jan Žižka, from the Ploština detachment, were returning from nearby Ryliska. The day before, they had celebrated the end of the war in Valašské Klobouky and had been assigned to relocate to Haluzice, near Barák Hill by Loučka. The partisans surrounded house no. 81, and a brief exchange of gunfire followed, during which bullets narrowly missed some children. The partisans captured one German soldier, dragged him into the forest, and executed him. One partisan was also killed, accidentally shot by his own comrades.

Local residents were well aware of the massacres that had taken place on 19 April in Ploština (just 2.5 km (1.6 mi) away and visible from the site), and on 23 April in Prlov, when the special anti-partisan unit SS-Einheit Josef from Slovakia, along with other ZbV units from Vizovice, brutally murdered civilians and burned down both villages. Following the advice of the partisans, the inhabitants of the farmsteads were urged to leave and stay with relatives or acquaintances, as it was certain the Germans would return. Most of the more than 50 residents heeded this advice and left. Some gathered essential personal belongings, food, and bedding, and went into hiding in the forest around noon.

=== Wehrmacht punitive expedition ===
In the evening of 2 May, German forces unexpectedly surrounded Vařákovy Paseky once again. They drove the livestock out of the barns and set eight houses on fire using Panzerfausts. The remaining two houses were left untouched, likely because they were off to the side and obscured by thick ground fog, making them hard to see. As the cottages burned, the asbestos roofing began to explode, which the Germans mistook for hidden partisan munitions. Believing there was an ammunition cache, they decided to massacre all the inhabitants of Vařákovy Paseky. The children, in despair, began to scream and cry. The residents explained to the Germans that the explosions were not caused by grenades or ammunition. As a result, the German commander canceled the extermination order.

== Remarks ==
In the autumn of 2011, Czech Television broadcast an episode dedicated to the village as part of the documentary series Ztracené adresy ('Lost Addresses').
