= Lidice massacre =

1942 Nazi destruction of Czech village

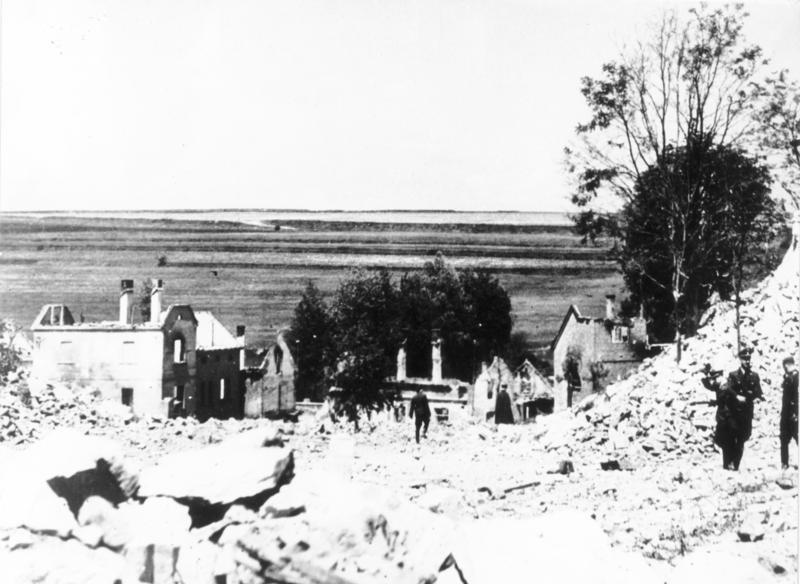
- Lidice in 1942 after its destruction by the Nazis
- Location: 50°08′35″N 14°11′25″E; Protectorate of Bohemia and Moravia
- Date: 10 June 1942
- Target: Czechs
- Attack type: Massacre
- Weapons: Firearms, gas
- Deaths: 340 including 82 children murdered later after transfer to Chełmno
- Perpetrator: Nazi Germany
- Motive: Reprisal attack following the assassination of Reinhard Heydrich

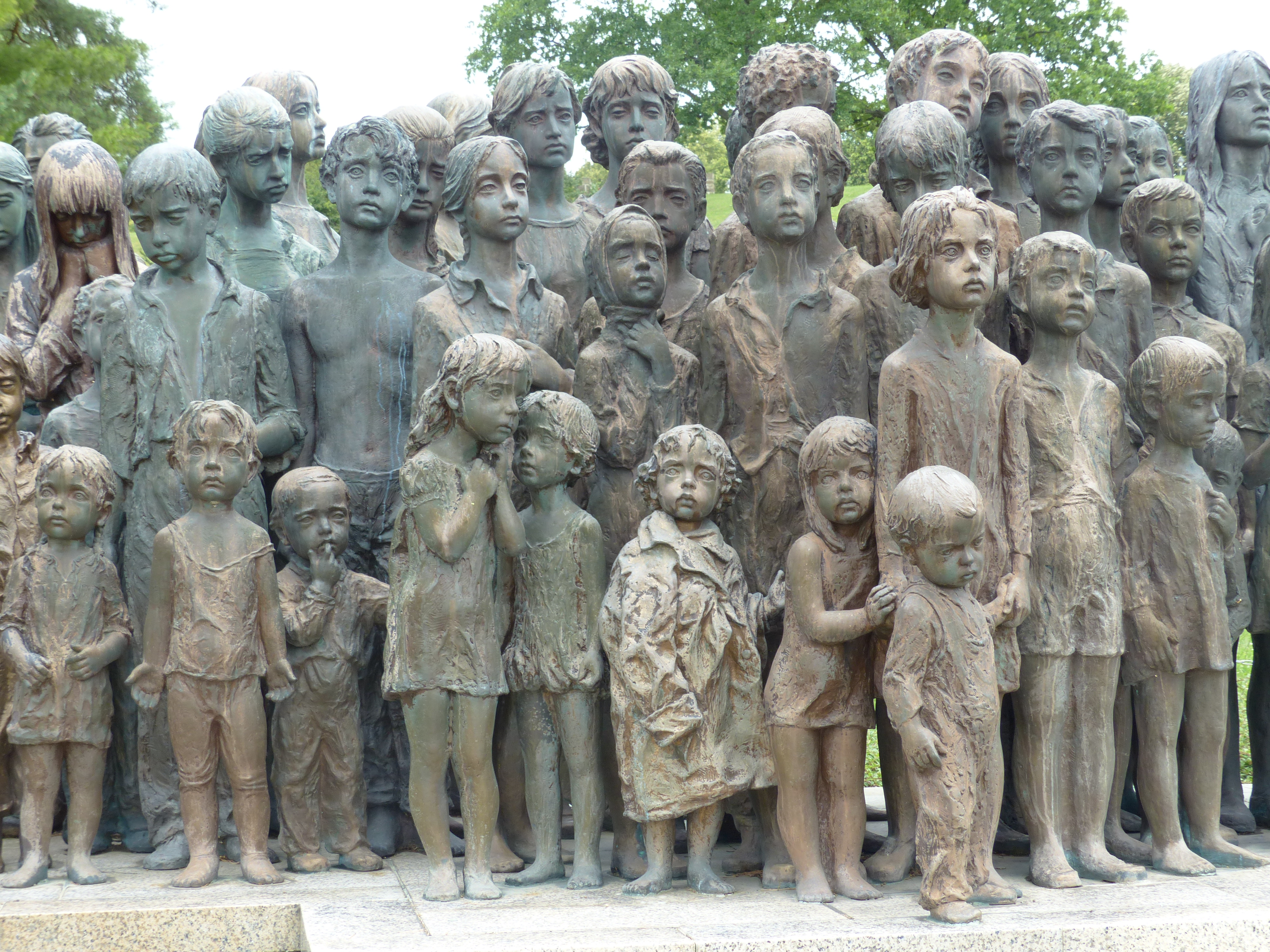
Memorial to the murdered children of Lidice

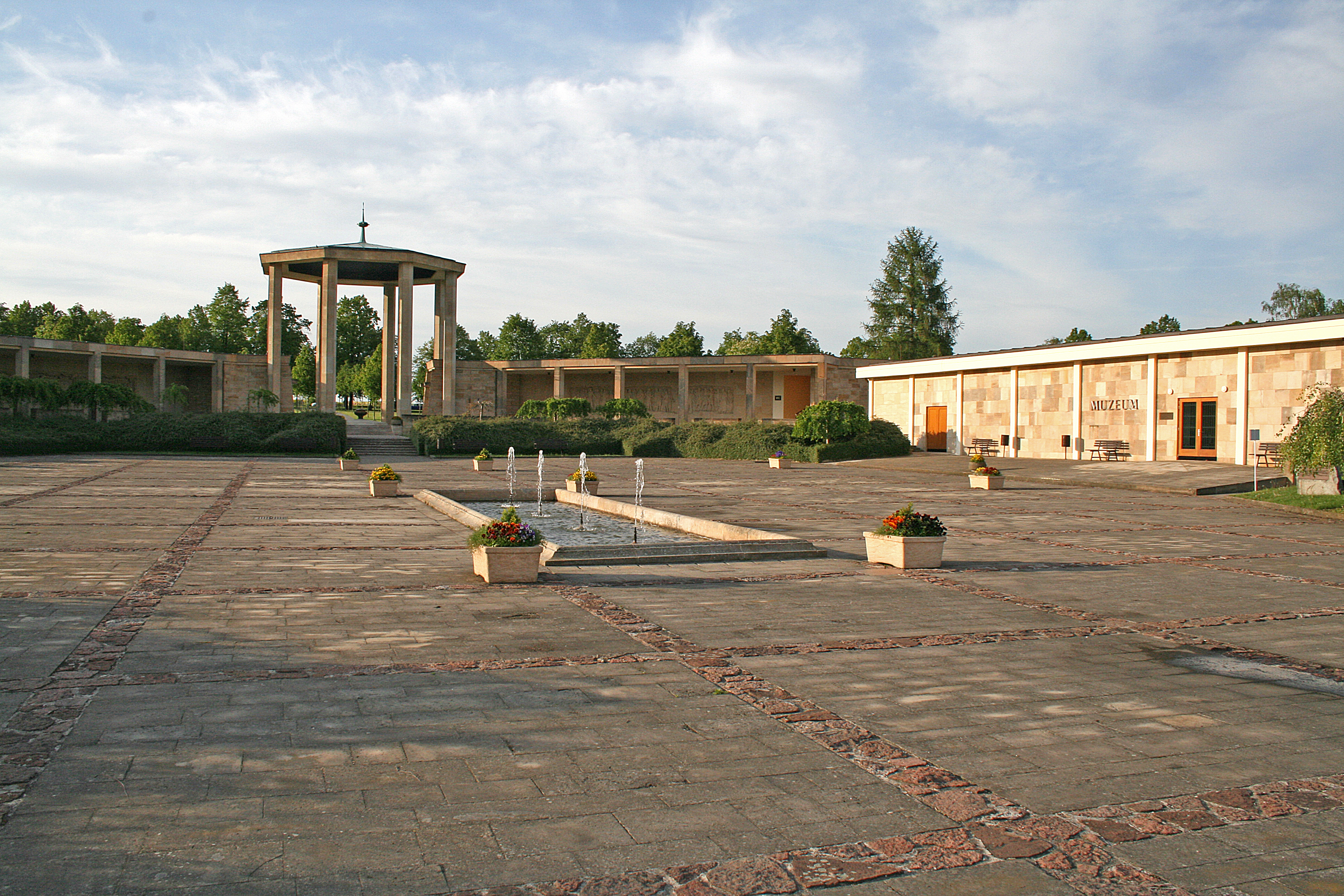
Lidice museum

The Lidice massacre (Czech: Vyhlazení Lidic) was the complete destruction of the village of Lidice in the Protectorate of Bohemia and Moravia, which is now a part of the Czech Republic, in June 1942 on orders from Nazi leader Adolf Hitler and acting Reichsprotektor Kurt Daluege, successor to Reinhard Heydrich. It has gained historical attention as one of the most documented instances of German war crimes during World War II, particularly given the deliberate killing of children.

In reprisal for the assassination of Reinhard Heydrich in the late spring of 1942, all 173 men and boys from the village aged 15 years or older were killed on 10 June 1942. A further nine men from the village, who were not present at the time, were arrested and executed soon afterwards, along with eight men and seven women, who were already under arrest, and two boys, who had recently turned 15. Most of the 203 women and 105 children were sent to a makeshift detention center in a Kladno school, after which the women were deported to concentration camps. Nine children, who were considered racially suitable and thus eligible for Germanisation, were handed over to German families, and 82 (excluding 14 children either under a year old or born after the massacre) were sent to the Chełmno extermination camp, where they were gassed to death.

The Associated Press, quoting German radio transmissions it received in New York, said: "All male grownups of the town were shot, while the women were placed in a concentration camp, and the children were entrusted to appropriate educational institutions." Approximately 340 people from Lidice were murdered in the German reprisal (192 men, 60 women and 88 children). After the war ended, only 143 women and 17 children returned.

Nazi propaganda openly and proudly announced the events at Lidice in direct contrast to the disinformation and secrecy involved with other crimes against civilian populations, with intense outrage occurring among Allied nations and particularly Anglosphere countries. The history has been depicted in multiple forms of media since the end of the conflict. Examples include two Hollywood movies made the year after the massacre, Hangmen Also Die! and Hitler's Madman, the internationally known drama film Operation Daybreak, and the composer Bohuslav Martinů composed the orchestral work Memorial to Lidice.

== Background ==
=== Assassination of Reinhard Heydrich ===
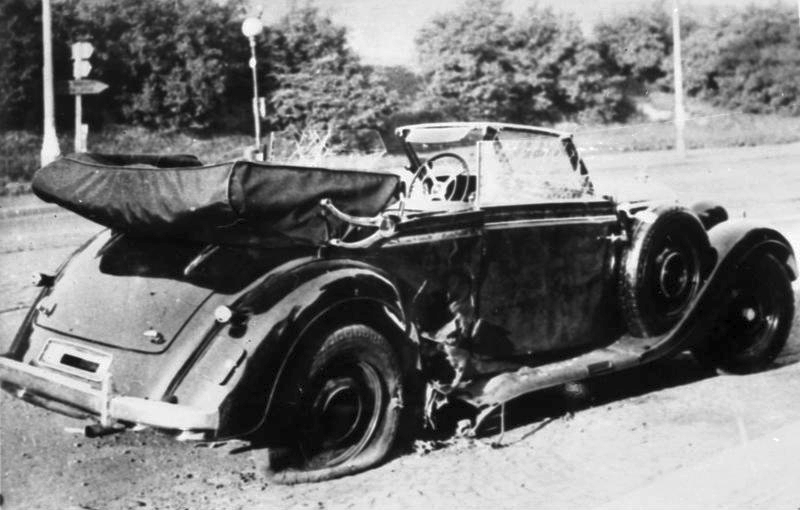
Heydrich's car at the scene of the attack.

From 27 September 1941, SS-Obergruppenführer and General of Police Reinhard Heydrich had been acting as Reichsprotektor of the Nazi Protectorate of Bohemia and Moravia. This area of the former state of Czechoslovakia had been occupied by Nazi Germany since 5 April 1939.

On the morning of 27 May 1942, Heydrich was being driven from his country villa at Panenské Břežany to his office at Prague Castle. When he reached the Kobylisy area of Prague, his car was attacked (on behalf of the Czechoslovak government-in-exile) by the Slovak and Czech soldiers Jozef Gabčík and Jan Kubiš. Part of a team trained in Great Britain, the duo had parachuted into Bohemia in December 1941 as part of Operation Anthropoid.

After Gabčík's Sten gun jammed, Heydrich ordered his driver, SS-Oberscharführer Klein, to stop the car. When Heydrich stood up to shoot Gabčík, Kubiš threw a modified anti-tank grenade at Heydrich's car. The resulting explosion wounded both Heydrich and Kubiš. Heydrich sent Klein to chase Gabčík on foot and, in an exchange of fire, Gabčík shot Klein below the knee. Kubiš and Gabčík managed to escape the scene. A Czech woman went to Heydrich's aid and flagged down a delivery van. Heydrich was placed on his stomach in the back of the van and taken to the emergency room at Bulovka Hospital. A splenectomy was performed, and the chest wound, left lung, and diaphragm were debrided. Himmler ordered Karl Gebhardt to fly to Prague to assume care. Despite a fever, Heydrich's recovery appeared to progress well. Hitler's personal doctor Theodor Morell suggested the use of the new antibacterial drug sulfonamide, but Gebhardt thought that Heydrich would recover and declined the suggestion. On 4 June Heydrich died from septicaemia caused by pieces of horsehair from the upholstery and his clothing entering his body when the bomb exploded.

=== Reprisals ===
Late in the afternoon of 27 May, SS-Gruppenführer Karl Hermann Frank proclaimed a state of emergency and placed a curfew in Prague. Anyone who helped the attackers was to be executed along with their families. A search involving 21,000 men began and 36,000 houses were checked. By 4 June, 157 people had been executed as a result of the reprisals but the assassins had not been found and no information was forthcoming.

The eulogies at Heydrich's funeral in Berlin were not yet over when, on 9 June, the decision was made to "make up for his death". Frank, Secretary of State for the Nazi Protectorate of Bohemia and Moravia, reported from Berlin that the Führer had commanded the following concerning any village found to have harbored Heydrich's killers:

1. Execute all men
2. Transport all women to a concentration camp
3. Gather the children suitable for Germanisation, then place them in SS families in the Reich and bring the rest of the children up in other ways
4. Burn down the village and level it entirely

=== Václav Říha letter ===
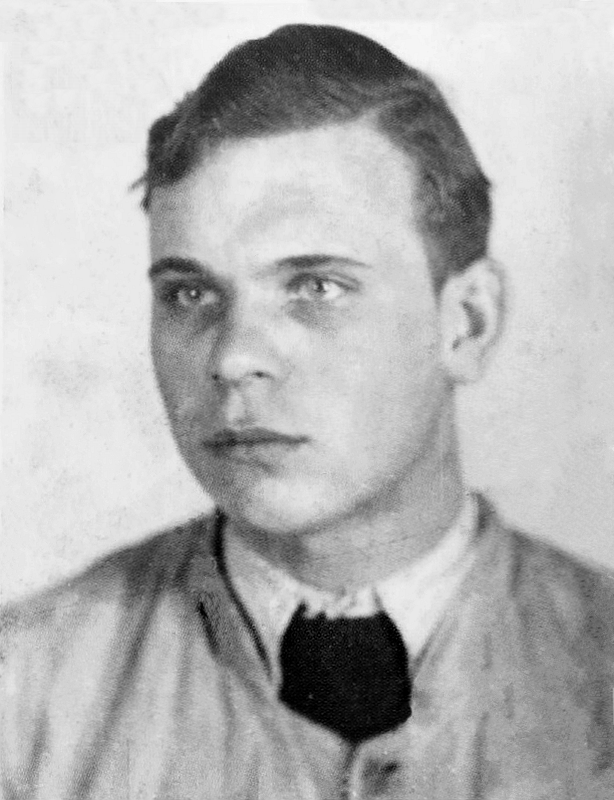
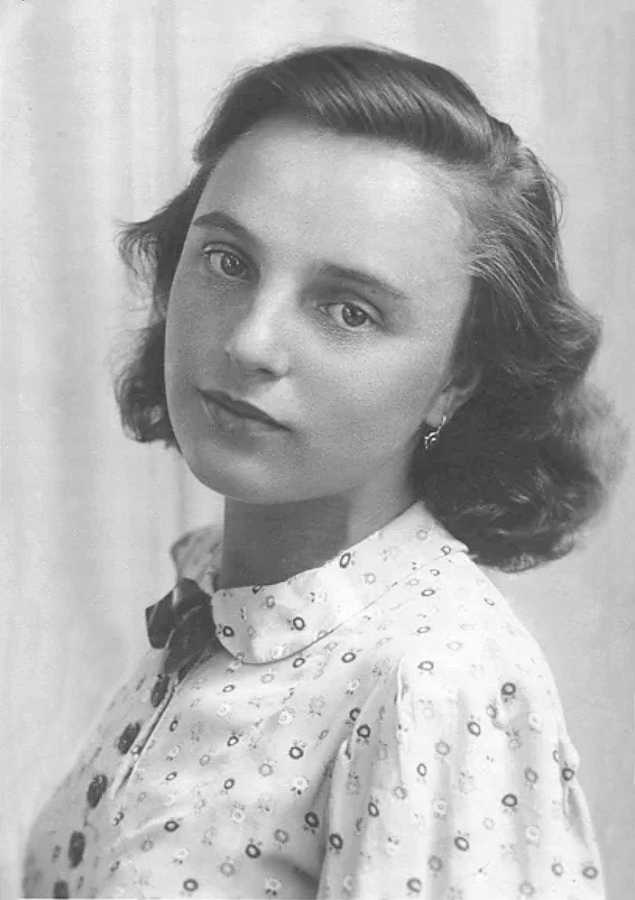
Václav Říha and Anna Maruščáková.

Lidice was targeted due to events stemming from a love letter sent by a man named Václav Říha to his lover Anna Maruščáková, neither of whom were from Lidice. Seeking to end his extramarital affair with Maruščáková, Říha wrote to her implying he had taken part in the Heydrich assassination, stating he had done "what he wanted to do" and that the two would never see each other again. He formulated the text of the letter in such a way that Maruščáková would interpret his "disappearance" as the departure of a resistance member or perhaps the assassin himself into the underground. The letter was delivered on 3 June 1942 to the factory where Maruščáková worked, but because Maruščáková was sick and at home that day, factory owner Jaroslav Pála opened the letter instead. Pála contacted the police, who in turn notified the Gestapo. Even though it was subsequently revealed that Říha had nothing to do with the assassination, Maruščáková when interrogated said that Říha had asked her to send greetings to the parents of Josef Horák, a Lidice man who had left to join the British Royal Air Force. This gave the Gestapo the pretext to target Lidice.

== Massacre ==
=== Men ===
Horst Böhme, the SiPo chief for the Protectorate of Bohemia and Moravia, immediately acted on Frank's orders. On the evening of 9 June 1942, members of the Ordnungspolizei and SD (Sicherheitsdienst) surrounded the village of Lidice, blocking all avenues of escape. The Nazi regime claimed it chose this village because its residents were suspected of harbouring local partisans and were associated with aiding Operation Anthropoid team members.

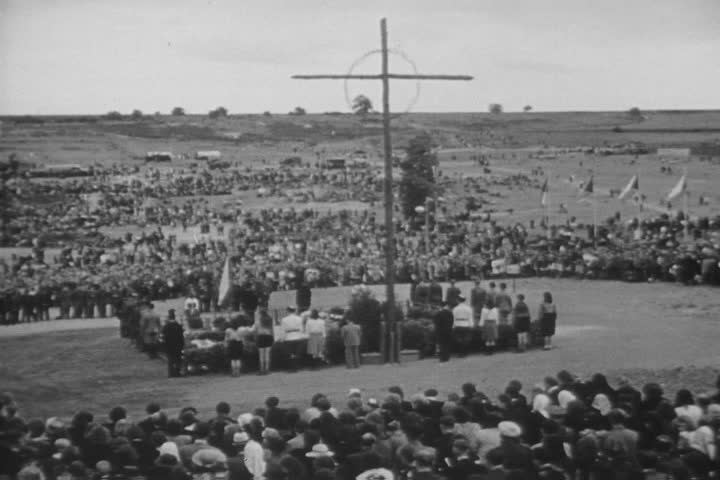
Post-war memorial ceremony to honour victims

All men of the village 15 years of age or older (and one 14-year-old) were rounded up and taken to the farm of the Horák family on the edge of the village. Mattresses were taken from neighbouring houses where they were stood up against the wall of the Horáks' barn to prevent ricochets. The shooting of the men commenced at about 7:00 am on 10 June. At first the men were shot in groups of five, but Böhme thought the executions were proceeding too slowly and ordered that ten men be shot at a time. The dead were left lying where they fell. This continued until the afternoon hours when there were 173 dead. Another nine men, who were not in the village that day (seven workers on a night shift, one in hospital, and one who hid for several days in the forest) were arrested and executed in Prague-Kobylisy soon afterwards. Also executed were eight men and seven women who had already been arrested because they had relations serving with the Czechoslovak armies in exile in the United Kingdom, and two boys who were discovered to have recently turned 15.

Only three male inhabitants of the village survived the massacre, two of whom were in the Czechoslovak Air Force and stationed in England at the time. The only adult man from Lidice who was actually in Czechoslovakia and survived the massacre was František Saidl (1887–1961), Lidice's former deputy mayor, who had been arrested at the end of 1938 for accidentally killing his son Eduard Saidl. He was imprisoned for four years and had no knowledge of the massacre until he returned home on 23 December 1942. Upon discovering the massacre, he was so distraught he turned himself in to SS officers in the nearby town of Kladno, confessed to being from Lidice, and even said he approved of the assassination of Heydrich. Despite confirming his identity, the SS officers laughed at him and turned him away; he went on to survive the war.

=== Women and children ===
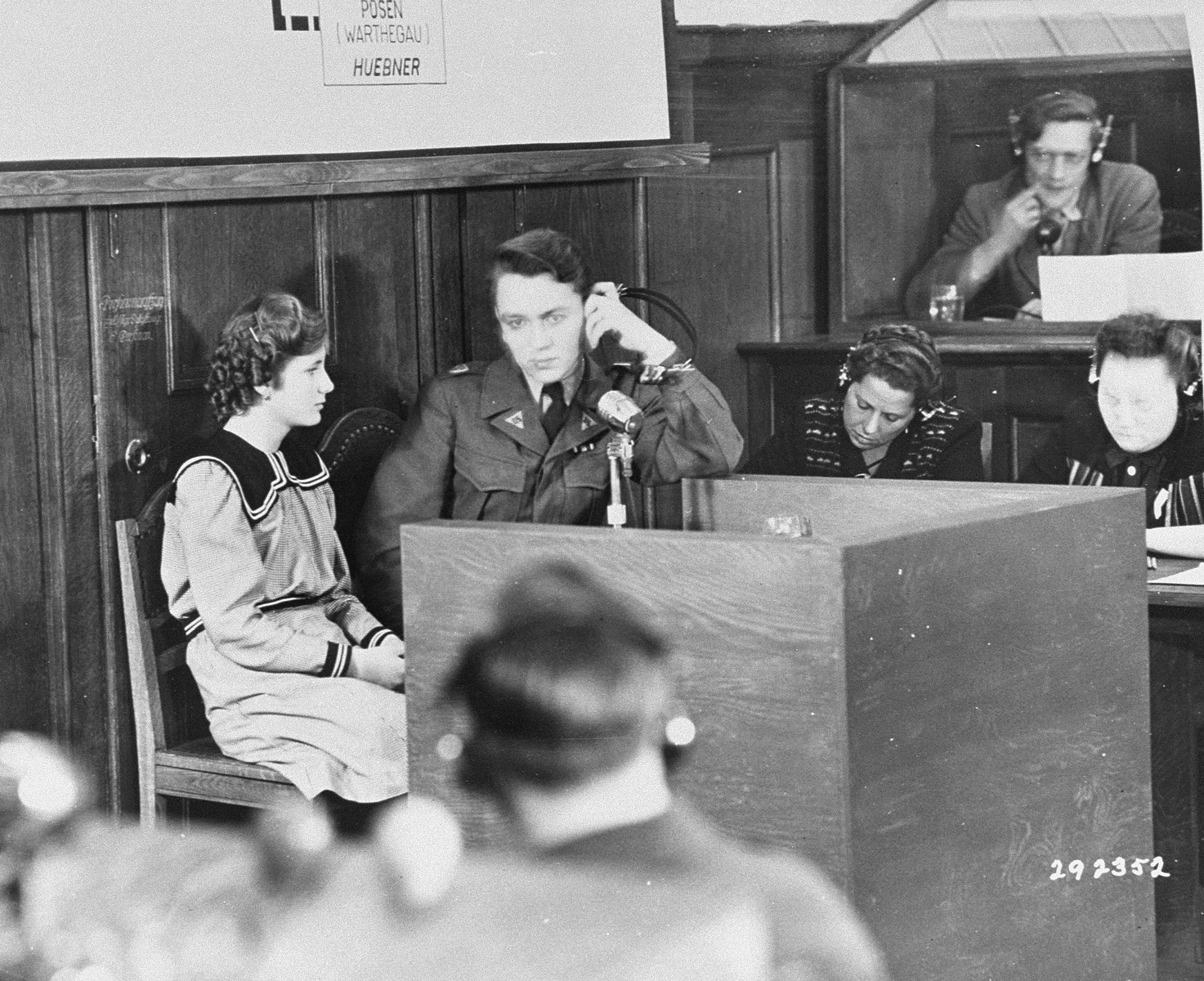
Marie Šupíková, one of the children kidnapped from Lidice, testifies at the RuSHA trial

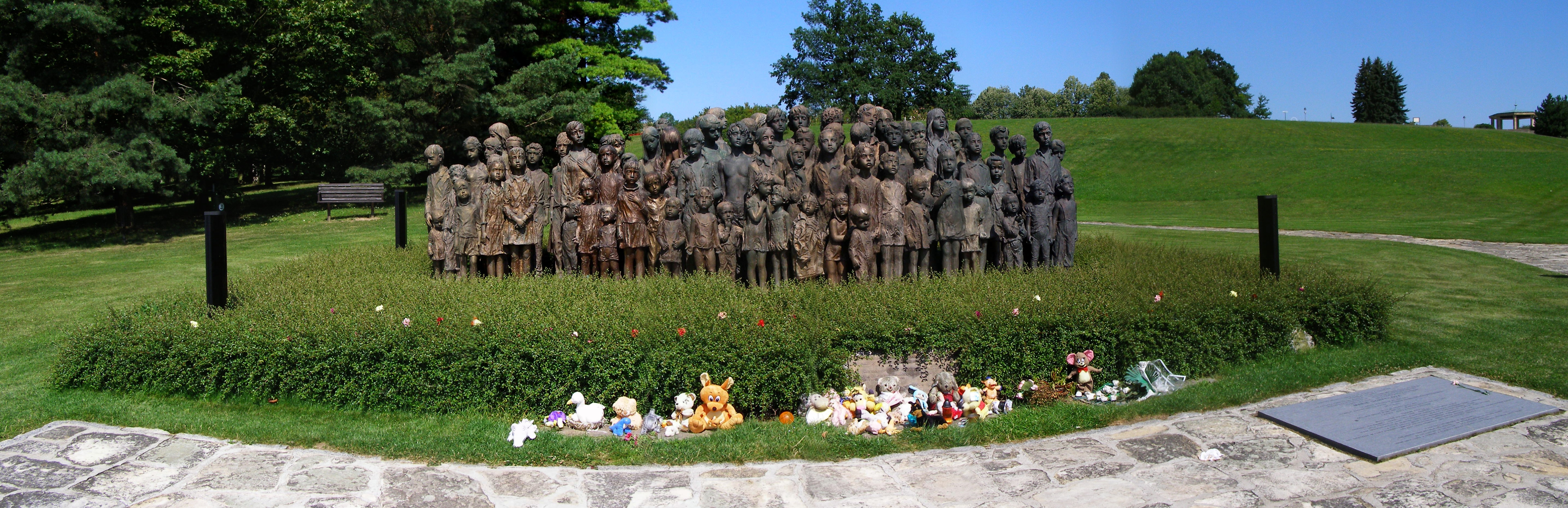
Memorial to the murdered children of Lidice

The women and children of Lidice were first taken to Lidice village school, then to the nearby town of Kladno, where they were detained in the grammar school for three days. In Kladno, the children were separated from their mothers. On 12 June 1942, 184 women of Lidice were loaded on trucks, driven to Kladno railway station and forced into a special passenger train guarded by an escort. On the morning of 14 June, the train arrived at the concentration camp at Ravensbrück. The camp authorities tried to keep the Lidice women isolated, but were prevented from doing so by other inmates. The women were forced to work in leather processing, road building, textile and ammunition factories. 12 remaining Lidice women were sent to Ravensbrück in the following months.

In Kladno, three children judged to possess Nordic features were selected on the spot for Germanisation. Seven children younger than one year old were taken to a foundling hospital in Prague-Vinohrady, and in August 1943 (except one child who died) were moved to a children's shelter in Prague-Krč. On 13 June, 88 Lidice children were transported to the area of the former textile factory in Gneisenau Street in Łódź. Their arrival was announced by a telegram from Horst Böhme's Prague office which ended with: the children are only bringing what they wear. No special care is desirable. The care was minimal and they suffered from a lack of hygiene and from illnesses. By order of the camp management, no medical care was given to the children. Shortly after their arrival in Łódź, officials from the Central Race and Settlement branch chose seven additional children for Germanisation. The few children considered racially suitable for Germanisation were handed over to SS or other German families.

The furore over Lidice caused some hesitation over the fate of the remaining children, but in late June Adolf Eichmann ordered the massacre of the remainder of the children. However, Eichmann was not convicted of this crime at his trial in Jerusalem, as the judges deemed that "... it has not been proven to us beyond reasonable doubt, according to the evidence before us, that they were murdered." On 1 July, the children were allowed to write letters to their families, which would later be returned as undeliverable. On 2 July, all of the remaining 81 Lidice children were handed over to the Łódź Gestapo office, who sent them to the Chełmno extermination camp 70 kilometres (43 miles) away, where they were gassed to death in Magirus gas vans. One girl who had been selected for Germanisation in Kladno was later deemed unsuitable and gassed in Chełmno, alongside the children from Ležáky, another destroyed Czech village. Seven children were born to Lidice mothers after the massacre; one in Ravensbrück concentration camp who was immediately killed, and six in a Prague maternity ward, of whom two survived the war.

Of the 203 Lidice women, 53 died in concentration camps, seven others were executed, and 143 survived. 82 of the 105 Lidice children were murdered in Chełmno, six others died during the war, and 17 returned home.

=== Lidice ===
The village was set on fire and the remains of the buildings destroyed with explosives. All animals in the village—pets and beasts of burden—were slaughtered. Even those buried in the town cemetery were not spared; their remains were dug up, looted for gold fillings and jewellery, and destroyed. A 100-strong German work party was then sent in to remove all visible remains of the village, re-route the stream running through it and the roads in and out. They then covered the entire area the village had occupied with topsoil and planted crops, and set up a barbed-wire fence around the site which had notices reading, in both Czech and German, "Anyone approaching this fence who does not halt when challenged will be shot". A film was made of the process by Franz Treml, a collaborator with German intelligence. Treml had run a Zeiss-Ikon shop in Lucerna Palace in Prague and after the Nazi occupation, he became a film adviser for the Nazi Party.

=== Further reprisals ===
The small Czech village of Ležáky was destroyed two weeks after Lidice, when Gestapo agents found a radio transmitter there that had belonged to an underground team who parachuted in with Kubiš and Gabčík. All 33 adults (both men and women) from the village were shot. The children were sent to concentration camps or "Aryanised". The death toll resulting from the effort to avenge Heydrich is estimated at over 1,300 people. This count includes relatives of the partisans, their supporters, Czech elites suspected of disloyalty and arbitrary victims like those from Lidice.

Between 19 April and 5 May 1945, the Nazis destroyed and massacred the populations of four Czech settlements as retribution for their support of anti-Nazi partisans: Javoříčko, Ploština, Prlov and Vařákovy Paseky.

== Commemorations ==
=== International response ===
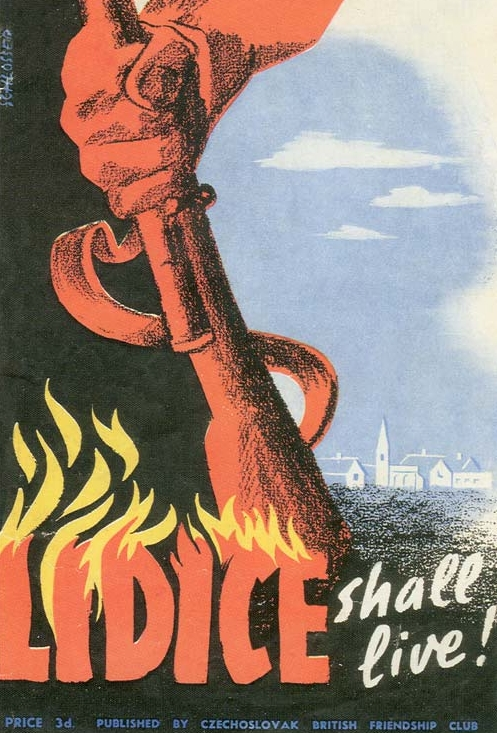
British poster commemorating Lidice

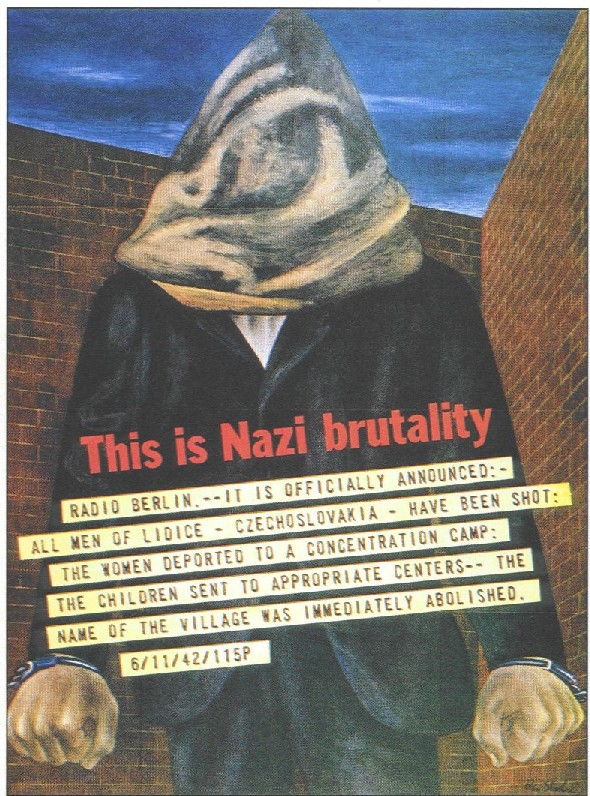
Poster by Ben Shahn, This is Nazi Brutality, referencing the massacre at Lidice.

Nazi propaganda had openly and proudly announced the events in Lidice, unlike other massacres in occupied Europe which were kept secret. The information was instantly picked up by Allied media. After the massacre Winston Churchill proposed destroying three German villages with incendiary bombing for every village destroyed in reprisals by the Wehrmacht. Anthony Eden, Leo Amery, and Ernest Bevin were supportive of the idea, but Archibald Sinclair, Clement Attlee, Herbert Morrison, and Stafford Cripps convinced him that it would waste resources and open the risk to similar Luftwaffe reprisals against British communities. In September 1942, coal miners in Stoke-on-Trent, Staffordshire, in Great Britain led by Barnett Stross, a doctor, who in 1945 became a local MP, founded the organisation Lidice Shall Live to raise funds for the rebuilding of the village after the war.

Soon after the razing of the village, towns and quarters (neighbourhoods) in various countries were renamed, San Jerónimo Lídice in Mexico City, Barrio Obrero de Lídice (workers quarter of Lidice) and its hospital in Caracas, Venezuela, Lídice de Capira in Panama and towns in Brazil so that the name would live on in spite of Hitler's intentions. A neighbourhood in Crest Hill, Illinois, U.S., was renamed from Stern Park to Lidice. There is a shrine at Lidice park on Prairie Avenue in Crest Hill; the original shrine was at the end of Kelly Avenue at Elsie Street. A square in the English city of Coventry, devastated by Luftwaffe bombing, is named after Lidice. An alley in a very crowded area of downtown Santiago, Chile, is named after Lidice and one of the buildings has a small plaque that explains its tragic story. A street in Sofia, Bulgaria, is named to commemorate the massacre and the Lidice Memorial in Phillips, Wisconsin, U.S., was built in memory of the village.

In the wake of the massacre, Humphrey Jennings directed The Silent Village (1943), using amateur actors from a Welsh mining village, Cwmgiedd, near the small South Wales town of Ystradgynlais. An American film was made in 1943 called Hitler's Madman, but it contained a number of inaccuracies in the story. A more accurate British film, Operation Daybreak, starring Timothy Bottoms as Kubiš, Martin Shaw as Čurda and Anthony Andrews as Gabčík, was released in 1975.

American poet Edna St. Vincent Millay wrote a book-length verse play on the massacre, The Murder of Lidice, which was excerpted in the 17 October 1942, edition of Saturday Review, a larger version of which was published in the 19 October 1942 Life magazine, and published in full as a book later that year by Harper.

There is a memorial sculpture and small information panel commemorating the Lidice massacre, in Wallanlagen Park in Bremen, Germany.

=== Local response and the new Lidice ===
Czech composer Bohuslav Martinů composed his Memorial to Lidice, an 8-minute orchestral work, in 1943, as a response to the massacre. The piece quotes from the Czech St Wenceslas Chorale and in the climax of the piece, the opening notes (dot-dot-dot-dash = V in Morse code) of Beethoven's 5th Symphony.

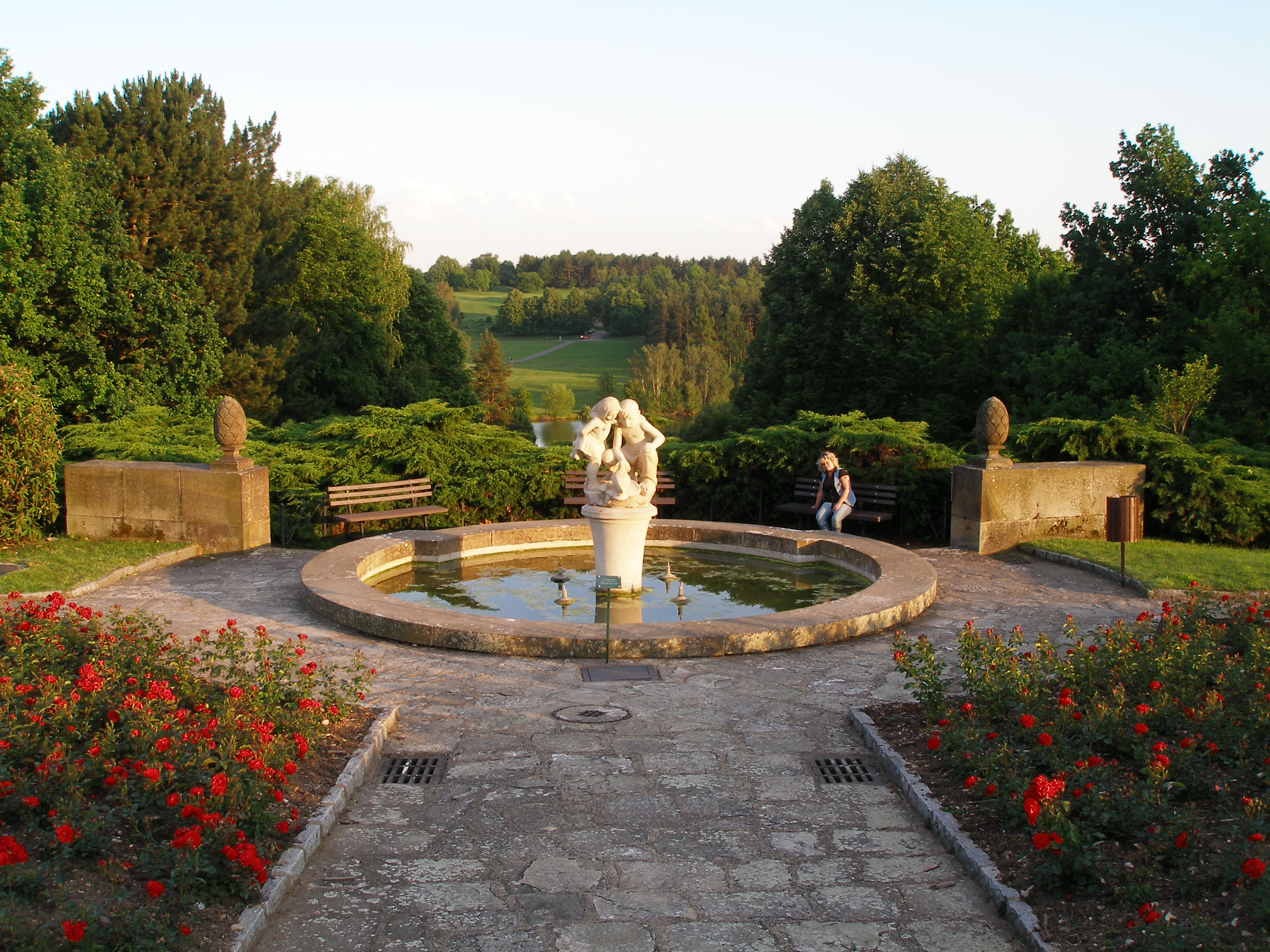
Lidice rose garden fountain

Women from Lidice who survived imprisonment at Ravensbrück returned after the Second World War and were rehoused in the new village of Lidice that was built overlooking the original site. The first part of the new village was completed in 1949. Two men from Lidice were in the United Kingdom serving in the Royal Air Force at the time of the massacre. After 1945 Pilot Officer Josef Horák and Flight Lieutenant Josef Stříbrný returned to Czechoslovakia to serve in the Czechoslovak Air Force.

After the 1948 Czechoslovak coup d'état the new Communist Party government would not allow them to apply to be housed in the new Lidice, because they had served in the forces of one of the western powers. Horák and his family returned to Britain and the RAF; he died in a flying accident in December 1948.

A sculpture from the 1990s by Marie Uchytilová overlooks the site of the old village of Lidice. Entitled "The Memorial to the Children Victims of the War", it comprises 82 bronze statues of children (42 girls and 40 boys) aged one to 16, to honour the children who were murdered at Chełmno in the summer of 1942. A cross with a crown of thorns marks the mass grave of the Lidice men. Overlooking the site is a memorial area flanked by a museum and a small exhibition hall. The memorial area is linked to the new village by an avenue of linden trees. In 1955 a "Rosarium" of 29,000 rose bushes was created beside the avenue of lindens overlooking the site of the old village. In the 1990s the Rosarium was neglected but after 2001 a new Rosarium with 21,000 bushes was created.

In 2024, as the monument was damaged by time and conditions, a public collection started raising funds to restore it. A surprise donation of $165,000 was made by an American donor, Donald R. Yadesky, a long-time supporter and member of the Friends of History Society.

== See also ==
- Lidice (also known as Fall of the Innocent), a 2011 Czech drama film

== Books ==
- Gerwarth, Robert (2011). Hitler's Hangman: The Life of Heydrich. New Haven, CT: Yale University Press. ISBN 978-0-300-11575-8.
- Jan Kaplan and Krystyna Nosarzewska, Prague: The Turbulent Century, Koenemann Verlagsgesellschaft mbH, Koeln, (1997) ISBN 3-89508-528-6
- Joan M. Wolf: Someone Named Eva. 2007. ISBN 0-618-53579-9
- Eduard Stehlík: Lidice, The Story of a Czech Village. 2004. ISBN 80-86758-14-1
- Zena Irma Trinka: A little village called Lidice: Story of the return of the women and children of Lidice. International Book Publishers, Western Office, Lidgerwood, North Dakota, 1947.
- Maureen Myant: The Search. Alma Books, 2010. ISBN 978-1-84688-103-9
- Williams, Max (2003). Reinhard Heydrich: The Biography, Volume 2 – Enigma. Church Stretton: Ulric Publishing. ISBN 978-0-9537577-6-3.
- Williamson, Gordon (1995). Loyalty is my Honor. Motorbooks International. ISBN 0-7603-0012-7.
