= Javoříčko =

- Village
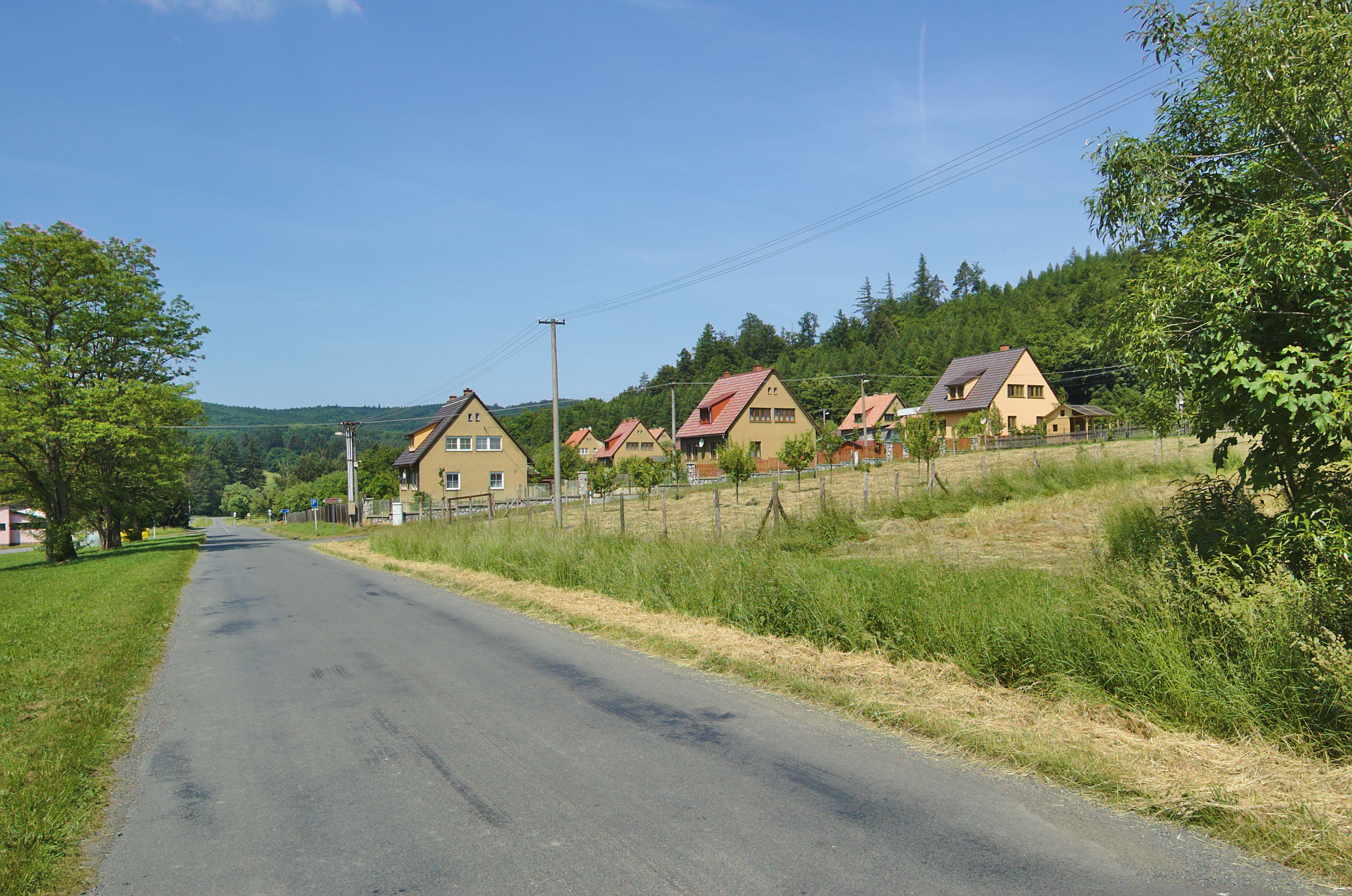
- View from the east

- Location in the Czech Republic
- Coordinates: 49°40′24″N 16°55′12″E
- Country: Czech Republic
- Region: Olomouc
- District: Olomouc
- Municipality: Luká
- First mentioned: 1348

Area
  - Total: 0.63 km^{2} (0.24 sq mi)
- Elevation: 375 m (1,230 ft)

Population (2021)
  - Total: 42
  - Density: 67/km^{2} (170/sq mi)
- Time zone: UTC+1 (CET)
  - Summer (DST): UTC+2 (CEST)
- Postal code: 783 24

Javoříčko is a village and municipal part of Luká in Olomouc District in the Olomouc Region of the Czech Republic. It has about 40 inhabitants. The village is known as the site of a Nazi massacre during World War II, which left it almost completely destroyed.

== History ==
The first written mention of Javoříčko is from 1348. In 1464–1538, the village belonged to the Bílá Lhota estate.

=== World War II events ===
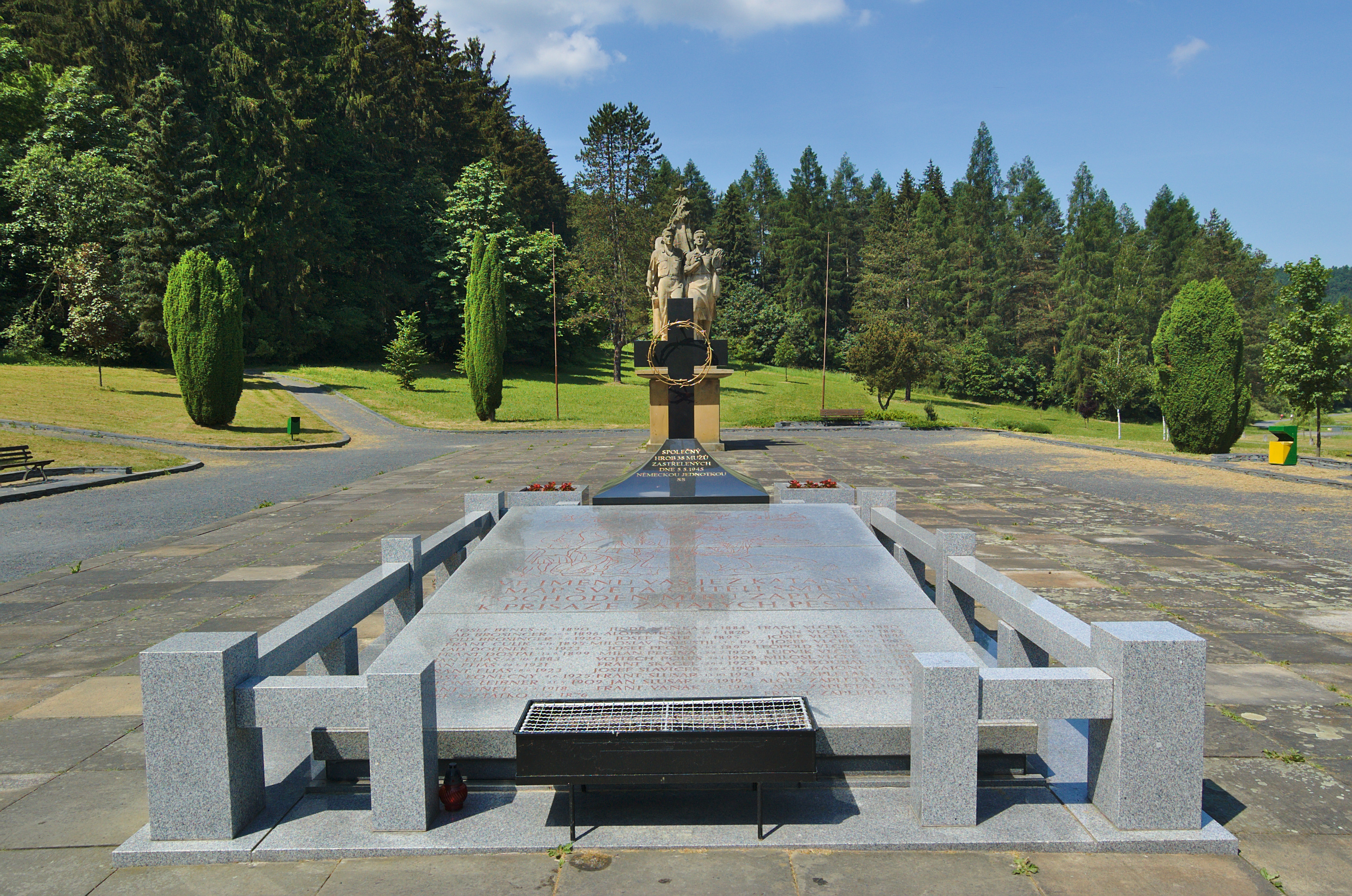
Memorial and mass grave of the 38 men who were killed

On 5 May 1945 towards the end of World War II, the village was burned down by the Nazis. The exact motive for the destruction of Javoříčko is not clear, though it was likely related to activities of Soviet partisans stationed in the village. In February 1945, Javoříčko became the base for a Soviet partisan group. On 10 April 1945, one of the partisans in a drunken state murdered the wife of a local Nazi Oberscharführer and her two children, and subsequently murdered three others who intervened. This incident is thought to have contributed to the Nazi retribution. There was also an incident on 4 May 1945 where the partisan group clashed with Nazi forces.

On 5 May 1945, the Nazis rounded up and shot 38 men in Javoříčko, and burned down the village. The youngest victim was 15 years old and the oldest was 75. The oldest adult male resident was left alive. The women and children were moved out of the village while this took place. After the massacre, only a few buildings such as the school remained standing.

Javoříčko is sometimes referred to as the "Moravian Lidice" due to similarities with the Lidice massacre of June 1942.

== Demographics ==
Historical population

Year	Pop.	±%
1869	172	—
1880	172	+0.0%
1890	183	+6.4%
1900	196	+7.1%
1910	163	−16.8%

Year	Pop.	±%
1921	149	−8.6%
1930	174	+16.8%
1950	12	−93.1%
1961	67	+458.3%
1970	71	+6.0%

Year	Pop.	±%
1980	75	+5.6%
1991	60	−20.0%
2001	52	−13.3%
2011	40	−23.1%
2021	42	+5.0%

Source: Censuses

== Sights ==
An important monument is the memorial to the victims of World War II. It is a memorial area that commemorated the massacre of the inhabitants and the destruction of Javoříčko. The memorial area comprises a park and a memorial called Vítězství ("Victory"). It is protected as a national cultural monument. Next to the site of the massacre is a small museum.
