= Luká =

- Municipality
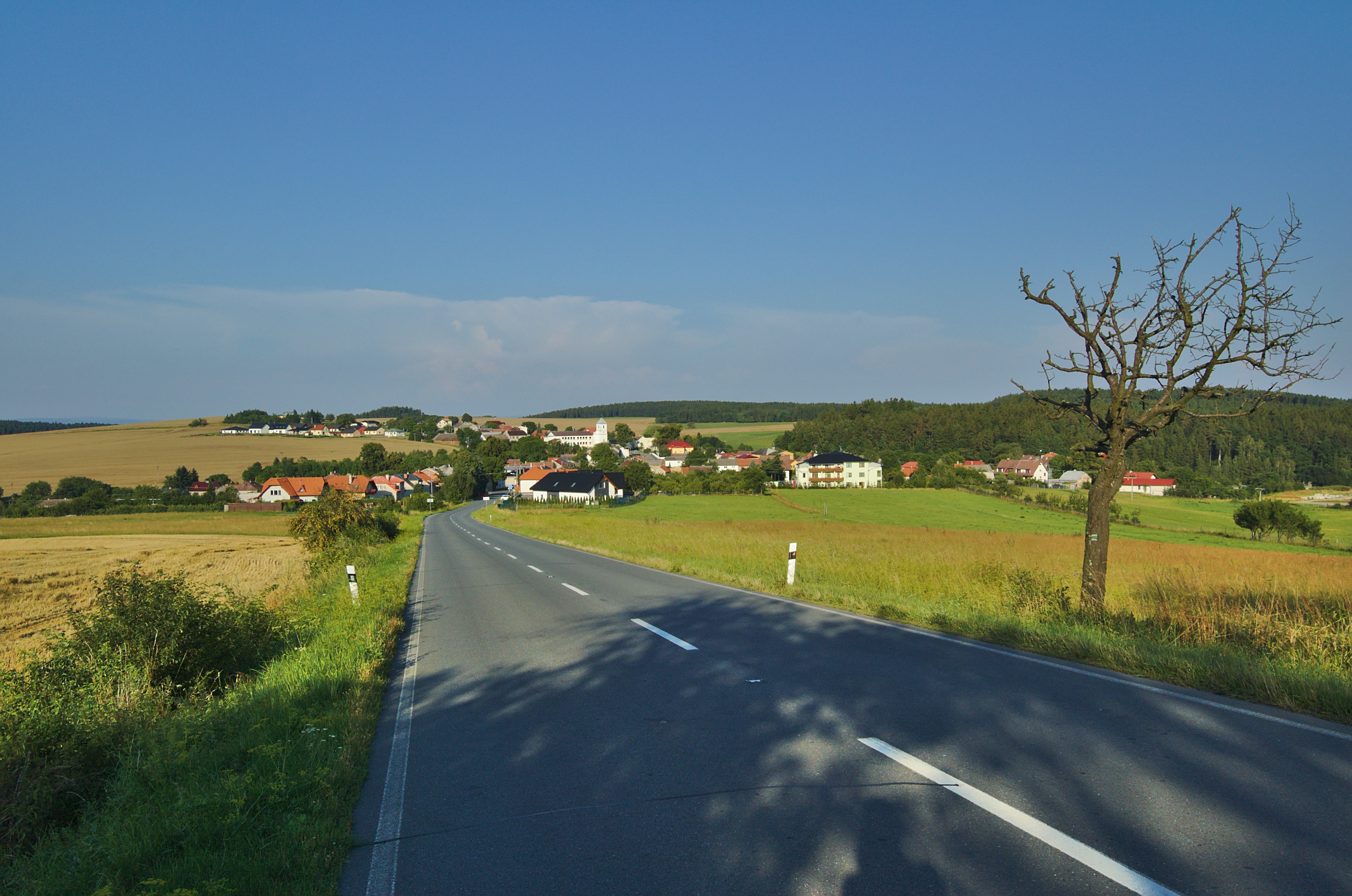
- View from the southwest

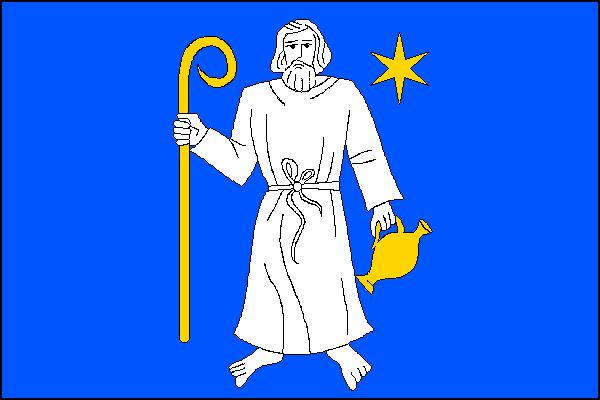
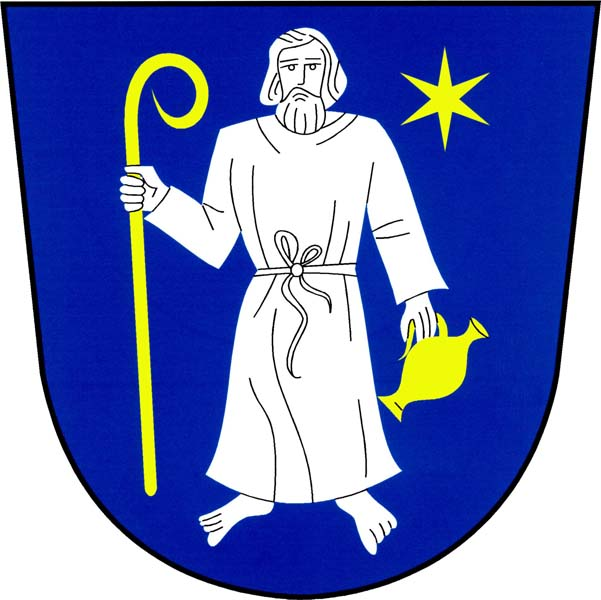
- Flag Coat of arms

- Location in the Czech Republic
- Coordinates: 49°38′57″N 16°56′50″E
- Country: Czech Republic
- Region: Olomouc
- District: Olomouc
- First mentioned: 1313

Area
  - Total: 14.84 km^{2} (5.73 sq mi)
- Elevation: 483 m (1,585 ft)

Population (2026-01-01)
  - Total: 901
  - Density: 60.7/km^{2} (157/sq mi)
- Time zone: UTC+1 (CET)
  - Summer (DST): UTC+2 (CEST)
- Postal code: 783 24
- Website: www.obec-luka.cz

Luká (Czech pronunciation: [ˈlukaː]; German: Luk) is a municipality and village in Olomouc District in the Olomouc Region of the Czech Republic. It has about 900 inhabitants. The municipality is located on the Javoříčka Stream in the Zábřeh Highlands.

The village of Javoříčko, which was destroyed during World War II, is located within the municipality. The memorial area that commemorates this event is protected as a national cultural monument.

== Administrative division ==
Luká consists of six municipal parts (in brackets population according to the 2021 census):

- Luká (529)
- Březina (22)
- Javoříčko (42)
- Ješov (153)
- Střemeníčko (74)
- Veselíčko (26)

== Geography ==
Luká is located about 22 kilometres (14 mi) west of Olomouc. It lies in the Zábřeh Highlands. The highest point is at 560 m (1,837 ft) above sea level. The Javoříčka Stream originates near the village and then flows to the north. The Šumice Stream also originates here and then flows to the south.

=== Climate ===
Luká's climate is classified as humid continental climate (Köppen Dfb). Among them, the annual average temperature is 8.1 °C (46.6 °F), the hottest month in July is 18.2 °C (64.8 °F), and the coldest month is −2.2 °C (28.0 °F) in January. The annual precipitation is 605.6 millimetres (23.84 in), of which July is the wettest with 86.2 millimetres (3.39 in), while February is the driest with only 26.3 millimetres (1.04 in). The extreme temperature throughout the year ranged from −27.3 °C (−17.1 °F) on 13 January 1987 to 35.7 °C (96.3 °F) on 20 August 2012.

Climate data for Luká (1991−2020 normals, extremes 1974−present)
Month	Jan	Feb	Mar	Apr	May	Jun	Jul	Aug	Sep	Oct	Nov	Dec	Year
Record high °C (°F)	13.5 (56.3)	15.7 (60.3)	21.8 (71.2)	26.2 (79.2)	29.4 (84.9)	32.0 (89.6)	34.8 (94.6)	35.7 (96.3)	30.4 (86.7)	24.8 (76.6)	18.0 (64.4)	12.6 (54.7)	35.7 (96.3)
Mean daily maximum °C (°F)	0.3 (32.5)	2.4 (36.3)	6.8 (44.2)	13.5 (56.3)	18.0 (64.4)	21.6 (70.9)	24.0 (75.2)	23.9 (75.0)	18.1 (64.6)	11.8 (53.2)	5.6 (42.1)	1.0 (33.8)	12.2 (54.0)
Daily mean °C (°F)	−2.2 (28.0)	−0.8 (30.6)	2.8 (37.0)	8.4 (47.1)	12.9 (55.2)	16.3 (61.3)	18.2 (64.8)	18.2 (64.8)	13.2 (55.8)	8.1 (46.6)	3.2 (37.8)	−1.2 (29.8)	8.1 (46.6)
Mean daily minimum °C (°F)	−4.4 (24.1)	−3.4 (25.9)	−0.3 (31.5)	4.1 (39.4)	8.4 (47.1)	11.8 (53.2)	13.6 (56.5)	13.5 (56.3)	9.6 (49.3)	5.2 (41.4)	1.1 (34.0)	−3.2 (26.2)	4.7 (40.5)
Record low °C (°F)	−27.3 (−17.1)	−22.4 (−8.3)	−16.1 (3.0)	−6.8 (19.8)	−2.9 (26.8)	0.0 (32.0)	5.2 (41.4)	4.8 (40.6)	−0.4 (31.3)	−6.0 (21.2)	−12.8 (9.0)	−17.8 (0.0)	−27.3 (−17.1)
Average precipitation mm (inches)	31.7 (1.25)	26.3 (1.04)	39.1 (1.54)	39.2 (1.54)	63.6 (2.50)	73.1 (2.88)	86.2 (3.39)	74.7 (2.94)	60.0 (2.36)	42.8 (1.69)	37.5 (1.48)	31.4 (1.24)	605.6 (23.84)
Average precipitation days (≥ 1.0 mm)	8.0	6.8	8.1	6.9	10.2	9.2	9.8	8.2	7.7	7.2	7.8	7.9	97.8
Mean monthly sunshine hours	56.8	81.6	133.4	195.7	227.4	228.5	245.4	240.9	170.8	110.7	53.5	42.2	1,786.9
Source 1: NOAA
Source 2: Czech Hydrometeorological Institute (extremes)

== History ==
The first written mention of Luká is from 1313.

On 5 May 1945, the village of Javoříčko was burned down by the SS and all 38 men were shot dead.

== Demographics ==
Historical population

Year	Pop.	±%
1869	1,476	—
1880	1,394	−5.6%
1890	1,471	+5.5%
1900	1,502	+2.1%
1910	1,358	−9.6%

Year	Pop.	±%
1921	1,389	+2.3%
1930	1,330	−4.2%
1950	944	−29.0%
1961	1,015	+7.5%
1970	985	−3.0%

Year	Pop.	±%
1980	932	−5.4%
1991	809	−13.2%
2001	764	−5.6%
2011	800	+4.7%
2021	846	+5.8%

Source: Censuses

== Transport ==
There are no railways or major roads passing through the municipality.

== Sights ==
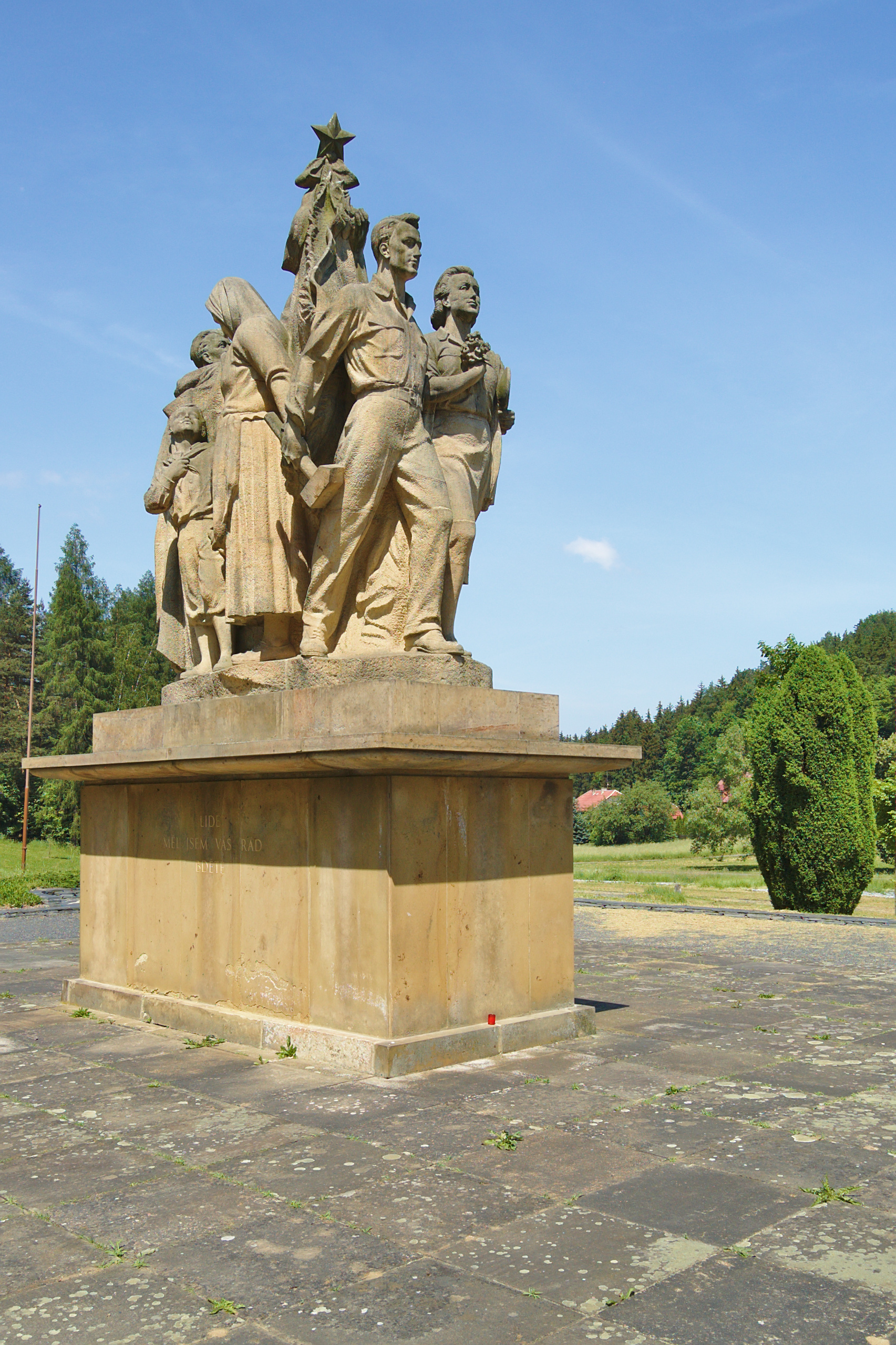
Vítězství memorial

An important monument is the memorial to the victims of World War II in Javoříčko. It is a memorial area that commemorated the massacre of the inhabitants and the destruction of the village of Javoříčko at the end of World War II. The memorial area comprises a park and a memorial called Vítězství ('victory'). It is protected as a national cultural monument.
