= Someone Named Eva =

2007 novel by Joan M. Wolf

- Author: Joan M. Wolf
- Original title: Someone Named Eva
- Genre: Historical fiction
- Publisher: Clarion Books
- Publication date: 2007
- Media type: Print (Hardcover and Paperback)
- Pages: 200
- ISBN: 0-618-53579-9
- OCLC: 71266346
- LC Class: PZ7.W819157 Som 2007

Someone Named Eva is a young adult novel by Joan M. Wolf. It follows life of Milada, an eleven-year-old Czech girl who is placed in the Lebensborn program during World War II, after Hitler annexes Czechoslovakia during the years 1942–1945.

== Plot summary ==
Milada, a young Czechoslovak girl, lives in the village of Lidice. The book starts with her and her friends hanging out on her 11th birthday when Milada receives a telescope. The next days, Nazis break into their home. She doesn't understand at first when Nazi soldiers come to her house, ordering them to pack belongings for three days and leave the house. Her father and her older brother, Jaroslav, are separated from the rest of the family to be taken elsewhere; Milada, her mother, baby sister Anechka, and grandmother, are subsequently held together with the rest of the female inhabitants of Lidice, in a building.

Milada is taken to a health examination where her facial features are measured and checked by doctors. With her "perfect" features, blue eyes, and blonde hair, Milada fits the "Aryan ideal" and is separated from her family, and is sent to a center outside of Puschkau, Poland. At the center, Milada is renamed Eva, a more "German" name, and the other girls are renamed too. The center employs harsh disciplinary methods and the girls are schooled in the German language, Nazi philosophies, and home economics so they can eventually join the German society. As hard as she works to remember, she forgets a little about herself in the process, like her language Czech.

Eva is adopted by a German family. The Werner family is composed of Vater, (father in German), a high official at the Nazi government, Mutter (mother), Elsbeth and Peter, her new adoptive siblings, and their dog, Kaiser. One day, as she is walking back to the house after a picnic with Elsbeth, Eva hears the Czech anthem being sung. Coming closer, she discovers a concentration camp with female prisoners. This brings back memories, enabling Milada to see clearly who she is. Elsbeth explains to her that this is the Ravensbrück concentration camp and that her Vater is the head of the camp.

The Nazis are losing on all fronts and Berlin is encircled by Russian troops. Vater decides to go into hiding and takes Peter with him, while Mutter, Elsbeth, and Eva move to the basement shelter to protect themselves. In May, Soviet Red Army troops come and ask for the documents left by Vater in his office, but Mutter tells them that she is not aware of anything. They leave without causing any harm to the family, but tear the house apart and taking everything in Vater's office. A few days later, Hitler is declared dead and the war is over.

Sometime after, representatives from the Red Cross Association come to the house and announce that Milada's mother is alive and she has launched a search for her daughter. Milada recognizes that she is the person they are looking for. At that moment Eva is Milada again. She is taken back to Czechoslovakia.

She meets her mother in Prague, discovering that she was detained in Ravensbrück, a few steps away from the Werner household. Milada also learns sadly that her father and Jaro, along with all the other adult and teenage males in the village, were killed by the Nazis on the same day they were separated. Her grandmother died in the Ravensbrück concentration camp because of her old age. Her best friend was also shot in Poland after she left for the center. Her sister Anechka was adopted into a German family and the Red Cross is looking for her, although it is never revealed whether or not she was returned. Milada's mother is ravaged from the harsh conditions of the camp and, after her recovery, the two move to live with a cousin in Prague. They return to visit Lidice but discover that their house, and pretty much the rest of the village, had been completely razed by the Germans. Milada slowly relearns the Czech language, nearly from scratch. Milada and her mother get closer again as they tell each other what happened during the horrific times of their separation. Finally, Milada manages to recover her true identity and pride.

== Awards ==
- Texas Bluebonnet Book Award Candidate
- Maryland Black Susan Award Candidate
- Illinois Rebecca Caudill Award Candidate and 2010 2nd place Honor Book
- Sunshine State Young Readers Award Candidate

== See also ==
- Lidice massacre
