= Haluzice (Zlín District) =

- Municipality
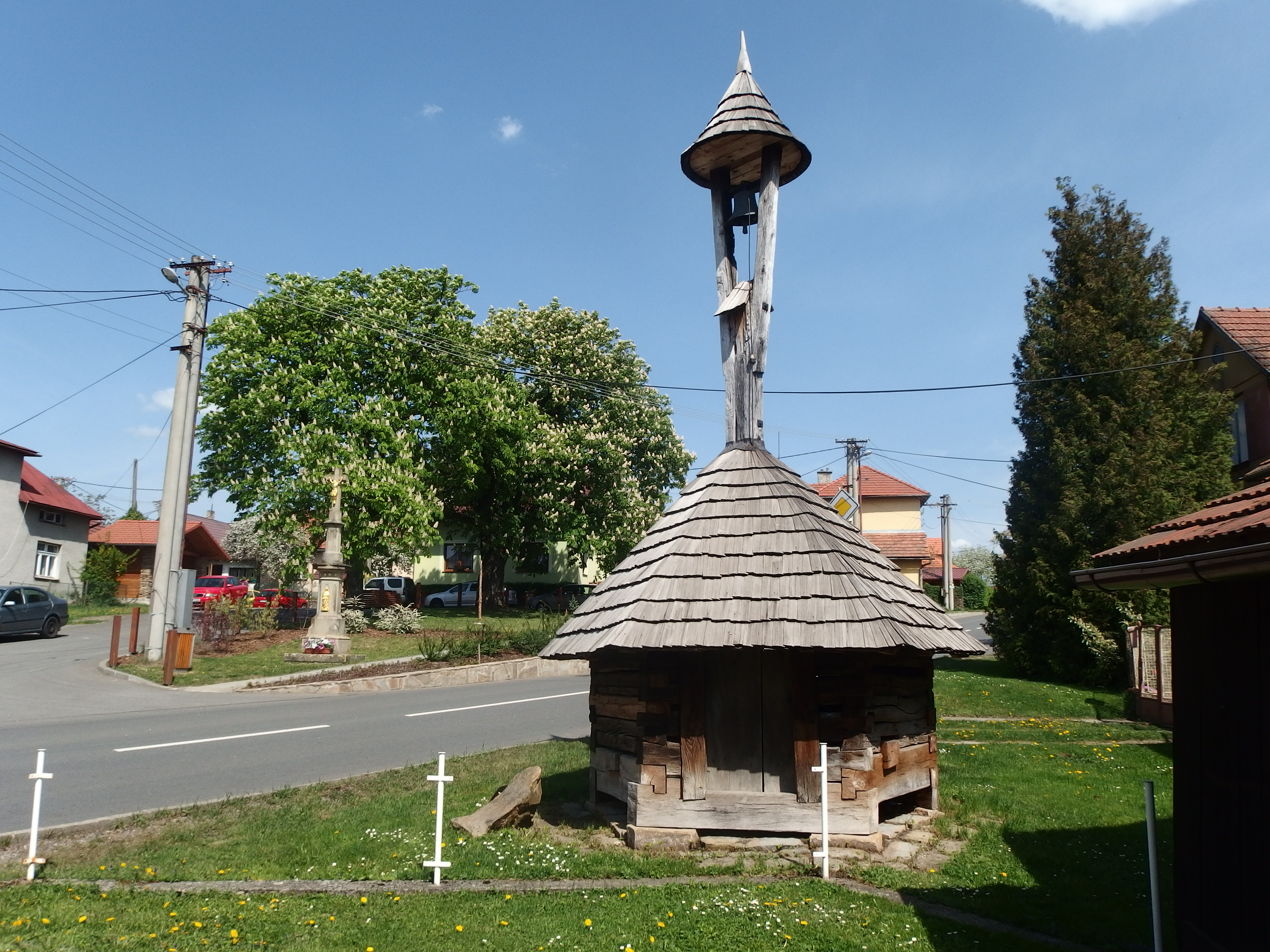
- Centre of Haluzice with a belfry

- Flag Coat of arms

- Location in the Czech Republic
- Coordinates: 49°8′16″N 17°53′50″E
- Country: Czech Republic
- Region: Zlín
- District: Zlín
- First mentioned: 1261

Area
  - Total: 4.08 km^{2} (1.58 sq mi)
- Elevation: 506 m (1,660 ft)

Population (2026-01-01)
  - Total: 85
  - Density: 21/km^{2} (54/sq mi)
- Time zone: UTC+1 (CET)
  - Summer (DST): UTC+2 (CEST)
- Postal code: 763 24
- Website: www.obechaluzice.cz

Haluzice is a municipality and village in Zlín District in the Zlín Region of the Czech Republic. It has about 90 inhabitants.

Haluzice lies approximately 20 kilometres (12 mi) south-east of Zlín and 272 km (169 mi) south-east of Prague.

== Demographics ==
Historical population
| Year | Pop. | ±% |
|---|---|---|
| 1869 | 140 | — |
| 1880 | 176 | +25.7% |
| 1890 | 164 | −6.8% |
| 1900 | 158 | −3.7% |
| 1910 | 161 | +1.9% |
| 1921 | 150 | −6.8% |
| 1930 | 156 | +4.0% |
| 1950 | 113 | −27.6% |
| 1961 | 141 | +24.8% |
| 1970 | 124 | −12.1% |
| 1980 | 99 | −20.2% |
| 1991 | 86 | −13.1% |
| 2001 | 74 | −14.0% |
| 2011 | 82 | +10.8% |
| 2021 | 83 | +1.2% |
Source: Censuses
