= Tichov =

- Municipality
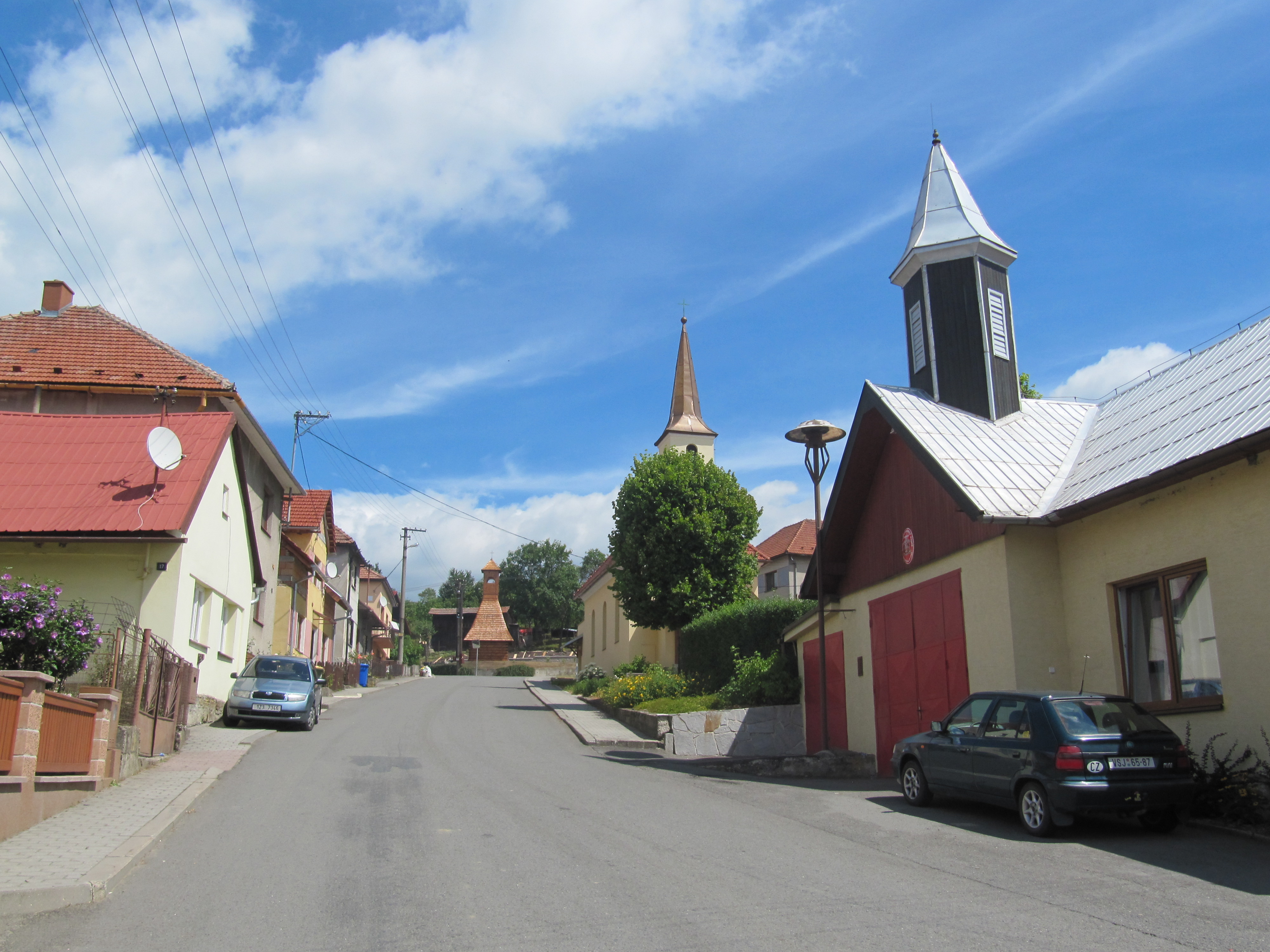
- Centre of Tichov

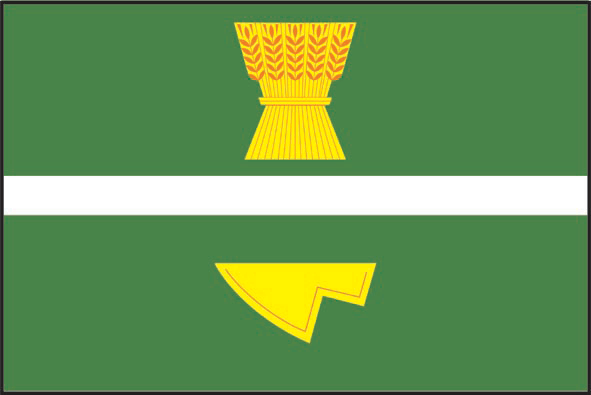
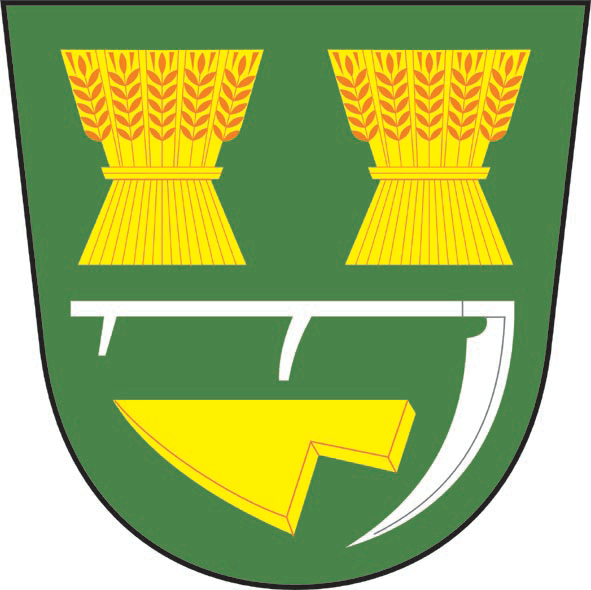
- Flag Coat of arms

- Location in the Czech Republic
- Coordinates: 49°10′39″N 17°58′58″E
- Country: Czech Republic
- Region: Zlín
- District: Zlín
- First mentioned: 1422

Area
  - Total: 7.32 km^{2} (2.83 sq mi)
- Elevation: 466 m (1,529 ft)

Population (2026-01-01)
  - Total: 347
  - Density: 47.4/km^{2} (123/sq mi)
- Time zone: UTC+1 (CET)
  - Summer (DST): UTC+2 (CEST)
- Postal code: 766 01
- Website: www.tichov.cz

Tichov is a municipality and village in Zlín District in the Zlín Region of the Czech Republic. It has about 300 inhabitants.

Tichov lies approximately 24 kilometres (15 mi) east of Zlín and 276 km (171 mi) east of Prague.

== Demographics ==
Historical population
Year	Pop.	±%
1869	381	—
1880	419	+10.0%
1890	442	+5.5%
1900	465	+5.2%
1910	436	−6.2%
1921	444	+1.8%
1930	487	+9.7%
1950	502	+3.1%
1961	562	+12.0%
1970	522	−7.1%
1980	415	−20.5%
1991	322	−22.4%
2001	327	+1.6%
2011	330	+0.9%
2021	298	−9.7%
Source: Censuses
