= Lačnov =

- Municipality
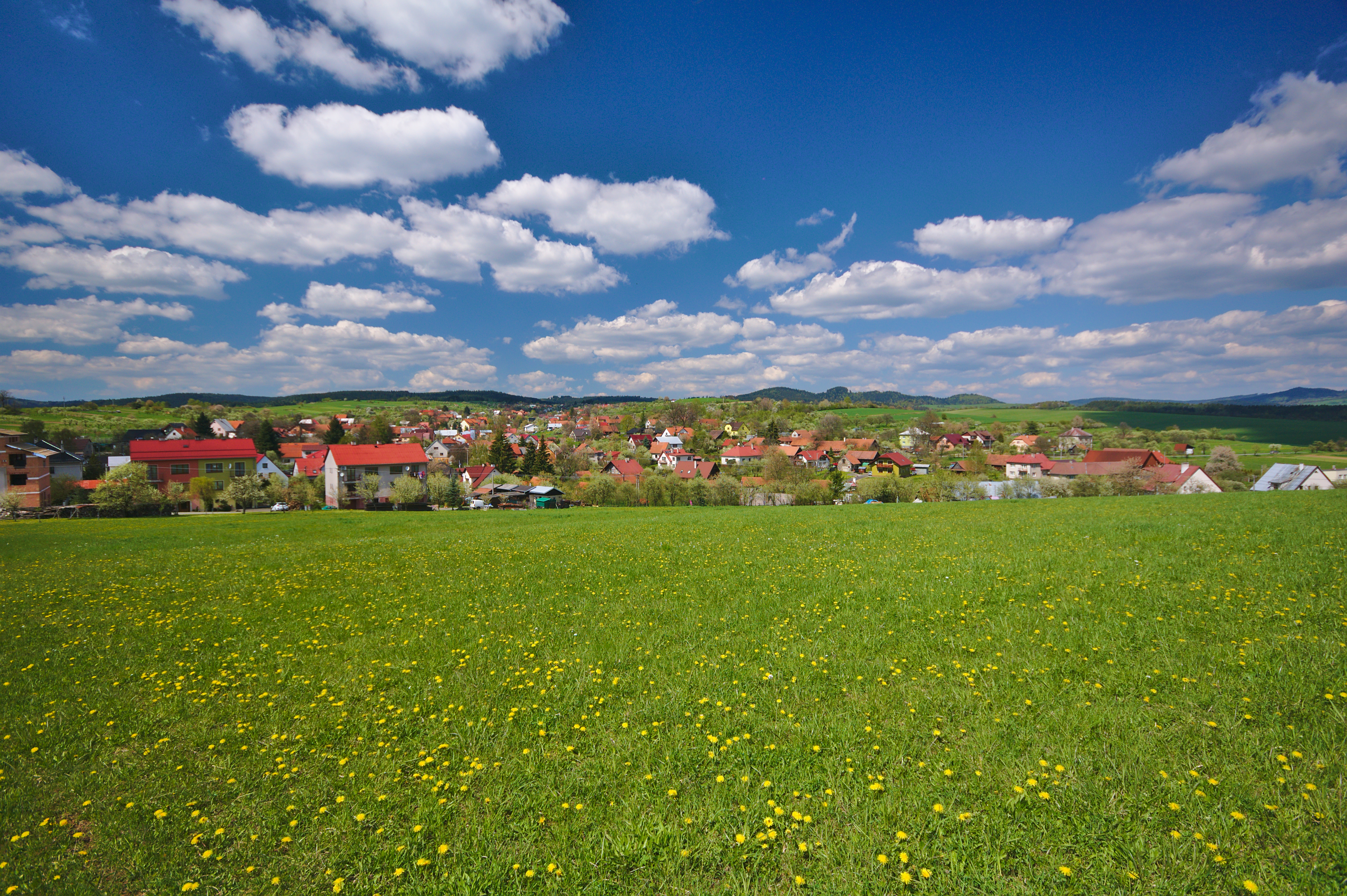
- General view

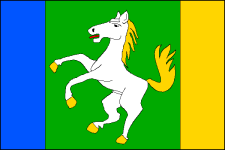
- Flag Coat of arms

- Location in the Czech Republic
- Coordinates: 49°10′44″N 18°0′59″E
- Country: Czech Republic
- Region: Zlín
- District: Vsetín
- First mentioned: 1422

Area
  - Total: 15.33 km^{2} (5.92 sq mi)
- Elevation: 520 m (1,710 ft)

Population (2026-01-01)
  - Total: 851
  - Density: 55.5/km^{2} (144/sq mi)
- Time zone: UTC+1 (CET)
  - Summer (DST): UTC+2 (CEST)
- Postal code: 756 12
- Website: www.lacnov.eu

Lačnov is a municipality and village in Vsetín District in the Zlín Region of the Czech Republic. It has about 900 inhabitants.

Lačnov lies approximately 18 kilometres (11 mi) south of Vsetín, 27 km (17 mi) east of Zlín, and 278 km (173 mi) east of Prague.

== Demographics ==
Historical population
| Year | Pop. | ±% |
|---|---|---|
| 1869 | 839 | — |
| 1880 | 864 | +3.0% |
| 1890 | 846 | −2.1% |
| 1900 | 829 | −2.0% |
| 1910 | 933 | +12.5% |
| 1921 | 851 | −8.8% |
| 1930 | 881 | +3.5% |
| 1950 | 858 | −2.6% |
| 1961 | 953 | +11.1% |
| 1970 | 918 | −3.7% |
| 1980 | 956 | +4.1% |
| 1991 | 894 | −6.5% |
| 2001 | 872 | −2.5% |
| 2011 | 894 | +2.5% |
| 2021 | 829 | −7.3% |
Source: Censuses
