= Ploština =

Abandoned village in the Czech Republic

Coordinates: 49°11′51″N 17°57′29″E

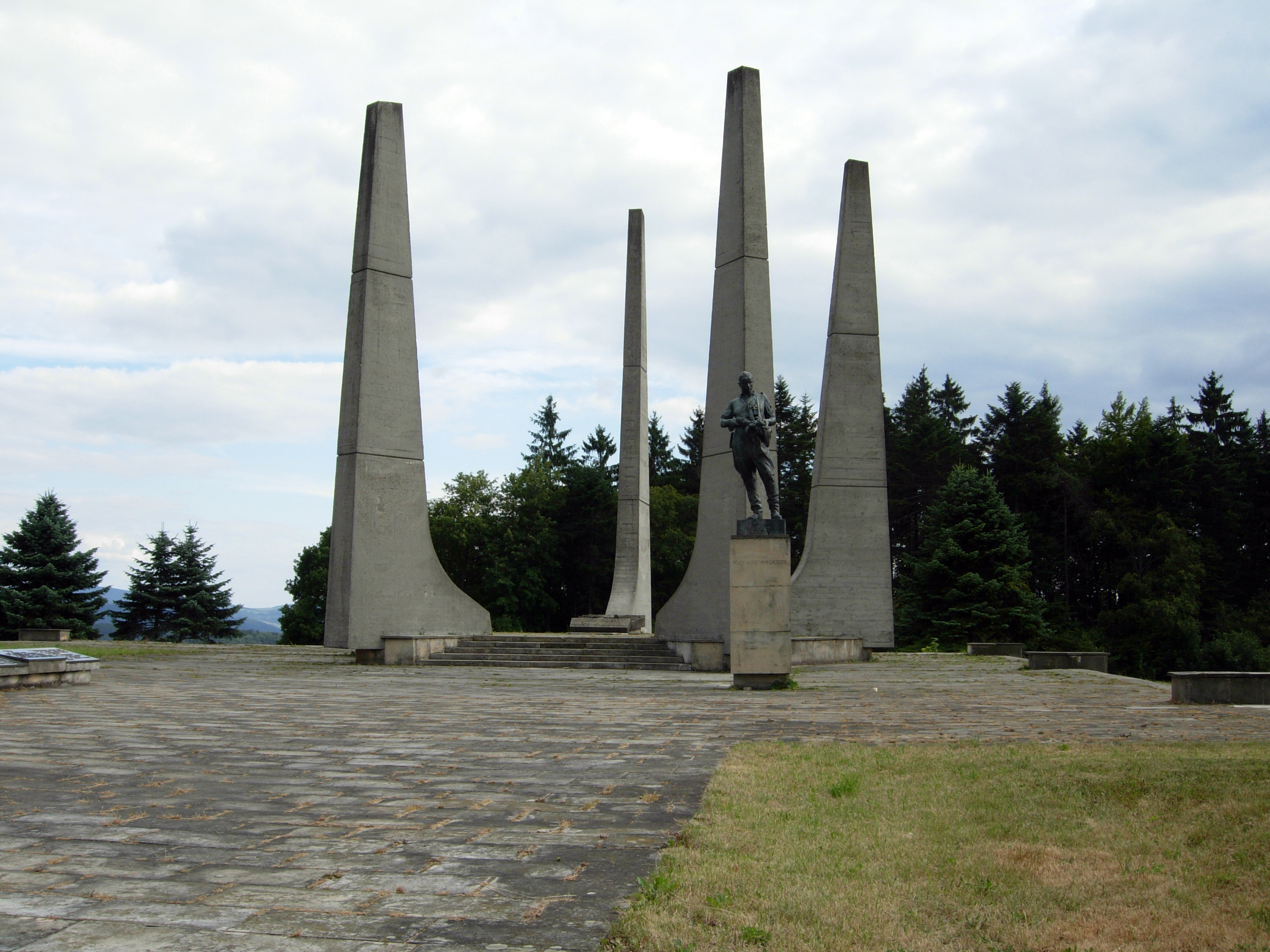
Ploština memorial

Ploština was a small settlement in what is today the municipality of Drnovice in the Zlín Region of the Czech Republic. On 19 April 1945, at the end of World War II, it was burned and its people were massacred by Nazis in response to their support of the anti-Nazi resistance movement. The massacre was conducted by the German special SS unit Zur besonderen Verwendung-Kommando Nr. 31, led by Walter Pawlofski, and by the SS anti-partisan unit Josef consisting of members of Slovak Hlinka Guard, whose headquarters was in Vizovice.

Twenty-four people were burned alive, three more people were executed, and one person was tortured to death during interrogation.

== Background ==
After the unsuccessful Slovak National Uprising, part of the resistance movement centered in Moravian Wallachia. Partisans formed armed groups along with local volunteers under Soviet commanders. They searched for help from villagers from surrounding settlements, who provided them with food, shelter, and basic treatment, and sometimes even helped them with military actions. The unit operating near Ploština was, however, infiltrated by Gestapo confidants and traitors who informed Nazis about the collaboration. This led to the punitive action conducted by Nazis on 19 April 1945, a few days before the end of World War II. According to Božena Húšťová, a witness whose brother was killed during the massacre, the men were forced to enter burning houses after a detonation of hidden ammunition in one of the houses. Those who attempted to escape were shot.

A similar tragedy occurred on 23 April 1945 in the nearby village of Prlov, where fifteen people were burned, three hanged and one shot. The last Nazi punitive action occurred in the settlement Vařákovy Paseky on 2 and 3 May 1945. Four people were killed and eight houses burned.

SS-Mann Werner Tutter (1909–1983), a commander of the unit Josef during the massacre in Ploština, was sentenced to six years in prison in 1948. While serving his sentence, he was contacted by the Communist Czechoslovak State Security Service (StB). In 1953, he became an agent of StB and worked for Communist Czechoslovakia in West Germany, under the code name Konrad II. His criminal past was revealed again in 1962, but the investigation was interrupted and Tutter died as an honorable German citizen in 1983. There were other SS commanders who evaded post-war justice, including Josef Pawlofski, a former teacher who lived freely in Munich, and Erich Wienecke, who was also never prosecuted for his crimes.

== Legacy ==
Ladislav Mňačko, writer and a member of the partisan group "Ploština", described this tragedy in his book Death Is Called Engelchen. The topic was also developed in the 1963 Czechoslovak war film Death Is Called Engelchen, directed by Ján Kadár and Elmar Klos.

A memorial was built on the site of the former Ploština settlement. It has been a national cultural monument of the Czech Republic.

== See also ==
- Lidice
- Ležáky
