= Bílá Lhota =

- Municipality
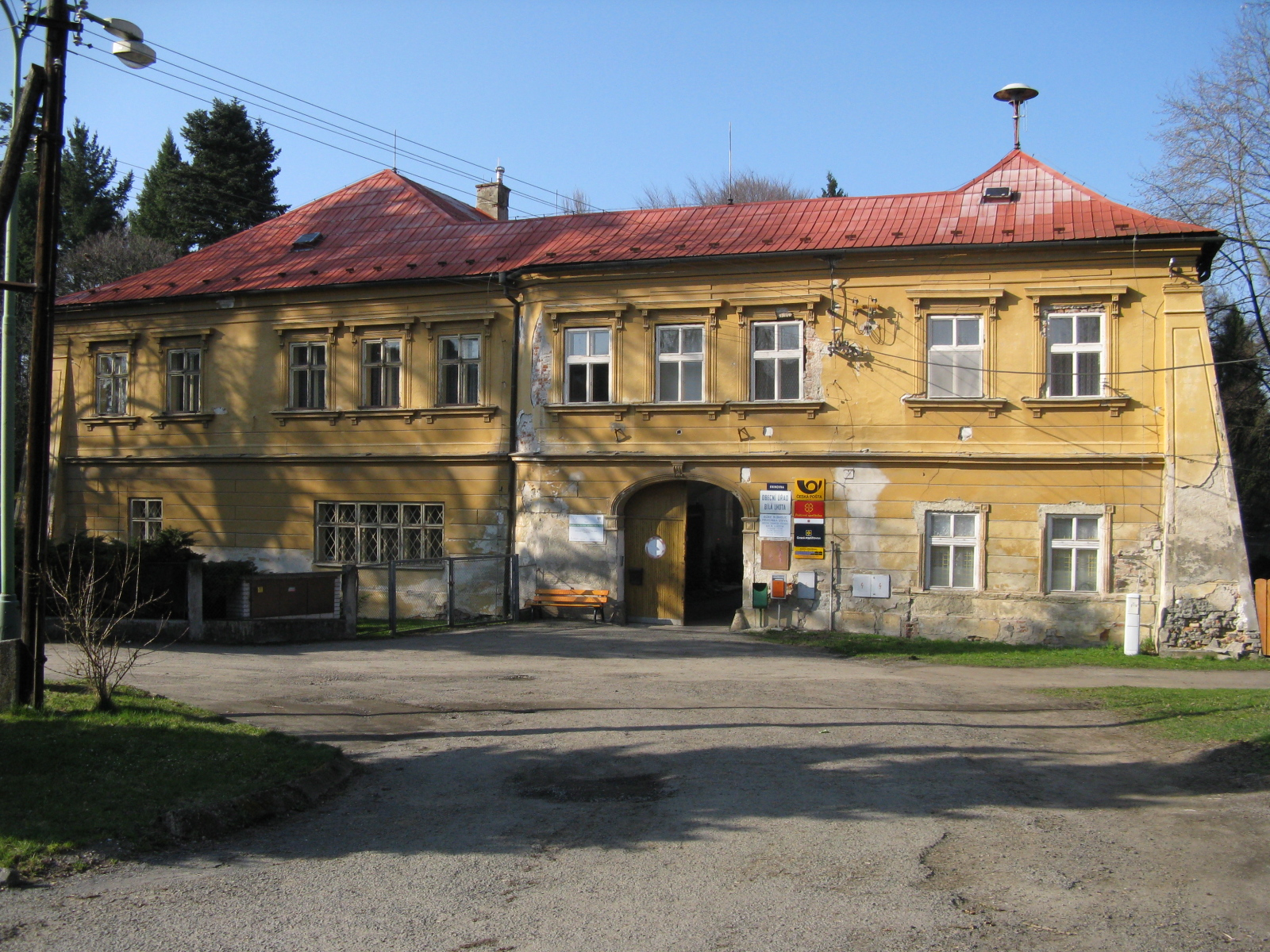
- Bílá Lhota Castle, now the municipal office

- Flag Coat of arms

- Location in the Czech Republic
- Coordinates: 49°42′34″N 16°58′30″E
- Country: Czech Republic
- Region: Olomouc
- District: Olomouc
- First mentioned: 1350

Area
  - Total: 18.22 km^{2} (7.03 sq mi)
- Elevation: 395 m (1,296 ft)

Population (2026-01-01)
  - Total: 1,146
  - Density: 62.90/km^{2} (162.9/sq mi)
- Time zone: UTC+1 (CET)
  - Summer (DST): UTC+2 (CEST)
- Postal codes: 783 21, 783 24
- Website: www.bilalhota.cz

Bílá Lhota (German: Weissöhlhütten) is a municipality and village in Olomouc District in the Olomouc Region of the Czech Republic. It has about 1,100 inhabitants.

== Administrative division ==
Bílá Lhota consists of seven municipal parts (in brackets population according to the 2021 census):

- Bílá Lhota (158)
- Červená Lhota (199)
- Hrabí (121)
- Hradečná (139)
- Měník (119)
- Pateřín (92)
- Řimice (278)

== Demographics ==
Historical population
Year	Pop.	±%
1869	1,852	—
1880	1,933	+4.4%
1890	2,004	+3.7%
1900	2,102	+4.9%
1910	2,041	−2.9%
1921	2,130	+4.4%
1930	2,046	−3.9%
1950	1,653	−19.2%
1961	1,705	+3.1%
1970	1,488	−12.7%
1980	1,295	−13.0%
1991	1,119	−13.6%
2001	1,117	−0.2%
2011	1,080	−3.3%
2021	1,106	+2.4%
Source: Censuses
