= Vysoké Pole =

- Municipality
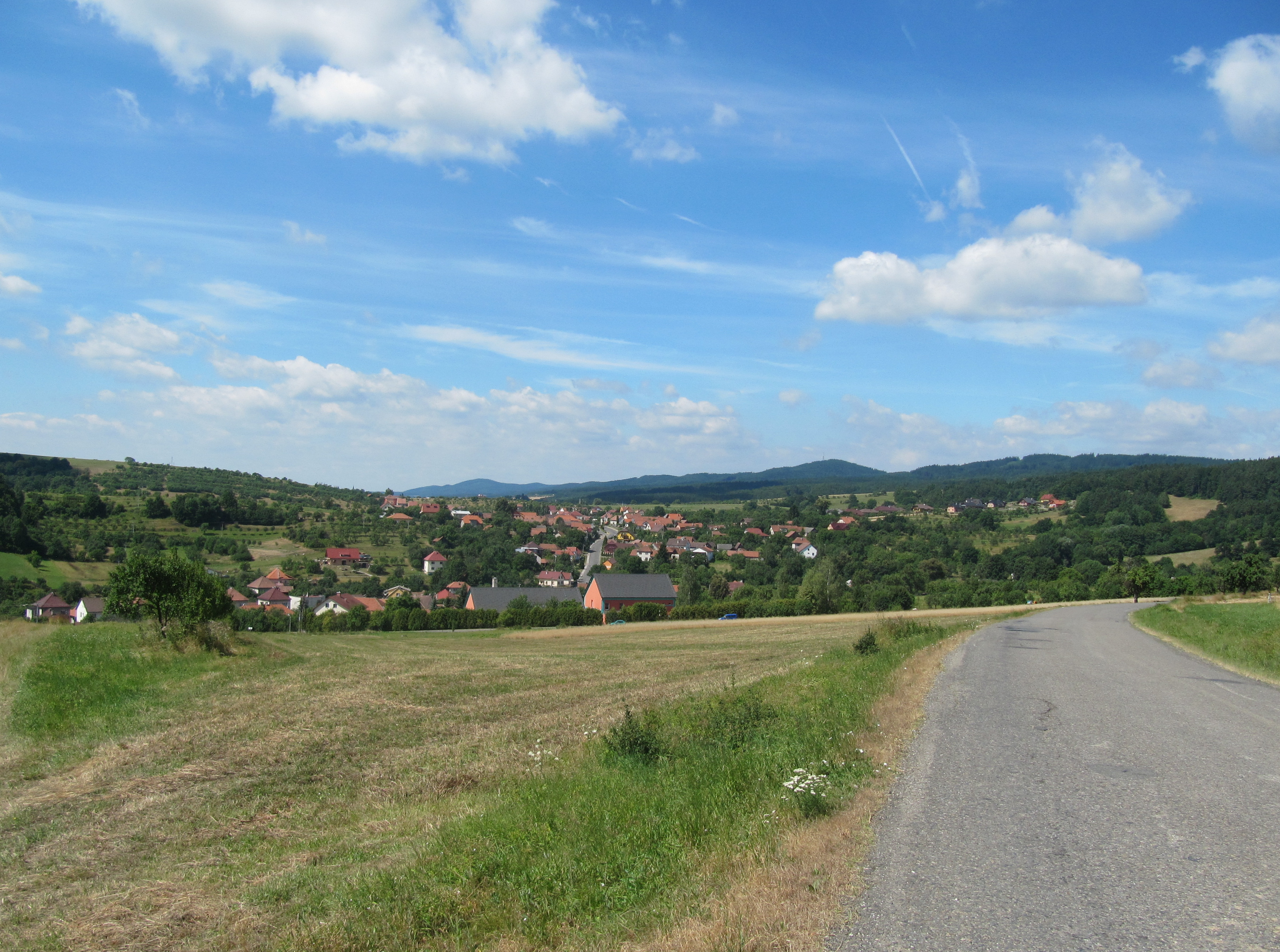
- View from the east

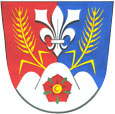
- Flag Coat of arms

- Location in the Czech Republic
- Coordinates: 49°10′39″N 17°56′14″E
- Country: Czech Republic
- Region: Zlín
- District: Zlín
- First mentioned: 1261

Area
  - Total: 12.10 km^{2} (4.67 sq mi)
- Elevation: 423 m (1,388 ft)

Population (2026-01-01)
  - Total: 855
  - Density: 70.7/km^{2} (183/sq mi)
- Time zone: UTC+1 (CET)
  - Summer (DST): UTC+2 (CEST)
- Postal code: 763 25
- Website: www.vysokepole.cz

Vysoké Pole is a municipality and village in Zlín District in the Zlín Region of the Czech Republic. It has about 900 inhabitants.

Vysoké Pole lies approximately 21 kilometres (13 mi) east of Zlín and 273 km (170 mi) east of Prague.

== Demographics ==
Historical population
Year	Pop.	±%
1869	565	—
1880	577	+2.1%
1890	627	+8.7%
1900	636	+1.4%
1910	663	+4.2%
1921	661	−0.3%
1930	674	+2.0%
1950	743	+10.2%
1961	926	+24.6%
1970	932	+0.6%
1980	857	−8.0%
1991	772	−9.9%
2001	759	−1.7%
2011	780	+2.8%
2021	811	+4.0%
Source: Censuses
