= Prlov =

- Municipality
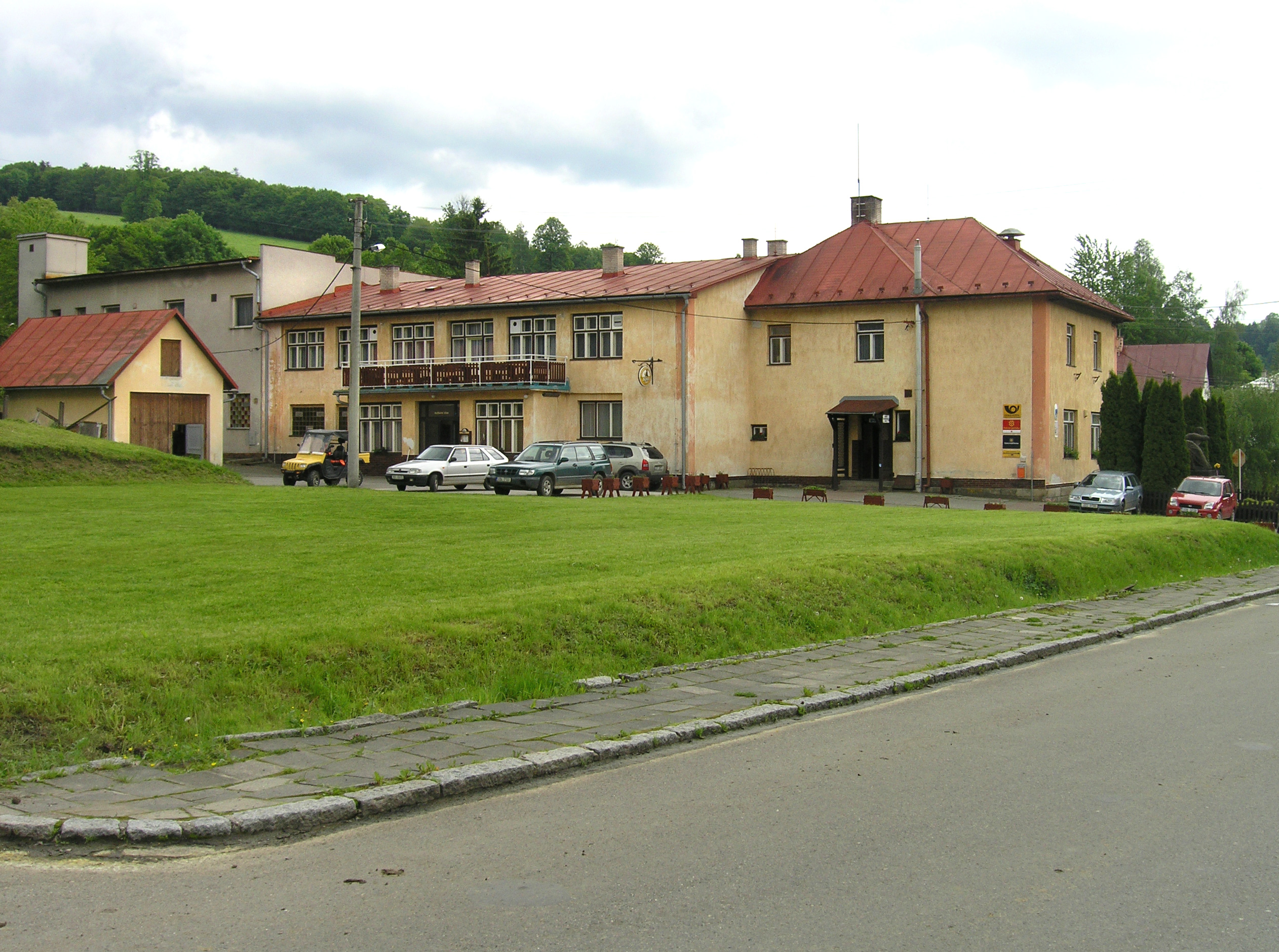
- Municipal office

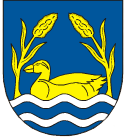
- Flag Coat of arms

- Location in the Czech Republic
- Coordinates: 49°14′52″N 17°57′41″E
- Country: Czech Republic
- Region: Zlín
- District: Vsetín
- First mentioned: 1361

Area
  - Total: 7.14 km^{2} (2.76 sq mi)
- Elevation: 414 m (1,358 ft)

Population (2026-01-01)
  - Total: 505
  - Density: 70.7/km^{2} (183/sq mi)
- Time zone: UTC+1 (CET)
  - Summer (DST): UTC+2 (CEST)
- Postal code: 756 13
- Website: www.obecprlov.cz

Prlov is a municipality and village in Vsetín District in the Zlín Region of the Czech Republic. It has about 500 inhabitants.

== Etymology ==
The origin of the name is uncertain. According to one theory, the name is derived from the Czech words perlit, perlivý ('to sparkle', 'sparkling'), referring to local streams. In the oldest documents, the name was written as Perlow.

== Geography ==
Prlov is located about 10 kilometres (6 mi) south of Vsetín and 20 km (12 mi) east of Zlín. It lies in the Vizovice Highlands. The highest point is the hill Široká at 645 m (2,116 ft) above sea level. The Pozděchůvka Stream flows through the municipality.

In the eastern part of the municipality is the fishpond Neratov. Together with its immediate surroundings, it is protected as a nature monument with an area of 1.9 ha (4.7 acres). It is a preserved wetland ecosystem with the occurrence of many endangered species within the country, especially amphibians.

== History ==
The first written mention of Prlov is in a deed of Pope Innocent VI from 1361, when it was property of the Cistercian Smilheim Monastery. The village was probably founded around 1300. From 1467, Prlov belonged to the Vizovice estate and shared its owners.

During World War II, on 23 April 1945, the village was the site of a tragic massacre. Nazi German SS units and members of the Slovak Hlinka Guard, retaliating against local support for partisans, burned eight houses and killed 23 inhabitants.

== Demographics ==
Historical population

Year	Pop.	±%
1869	435	—
1880	492	+13.1%
1890	519	+5.5%
1900	544	+4.8%
1910	581	+6.8%

Year	Pop.	±%
1921	598	+2.9%
1930	556	−7.0%
1950	501	−9.9%
1961	664	+32.5%
1970	642	−3.3%

Year	Pop.	±%
1980	582	−9.3%
1991	544	−6.5%
2001	549	+0.9%
2011	517	−5.8%
2021	502	−2.9%

Source: Censuses

== Transport ==
The I/49 road, which connects Zlín with the Czech–Slovak border in Střelná, runs through the municipality.

== Sights ==
There are no protected cultural monuments in the municipality.

The Prlov Tragedy is commemorated by a memorial room at the municipal office.
