= Sedlice =

Sedlice may refer to places in the Czech Republic:

== Czech Republic ==
- Sedlice, Pelhřimov District, a municipality and village in the Vysočina Region
- Sedlice, Příbram District, a municipality and village in the Central Bohemian Region
- Sedlice (Strakonice District), a town in the South Bohemian Region
- Sedlice, a village and part of Keblov in the Central Bohemian Region
- Sedlice, a village and part of Praskačka in the Hradec Králové Region
- Sedlice, a village and part of Přídolí in the South Bohemian Region
- Sedlice, a village and part of Zahořany (Domažlice District) in the Plzeň Region
- Nové Sedlice, a municipality and village in the Moravian-Silesian Region

== Slovakia ==
- Sedlice, Prešov District, a municipality and village in the Prešov Region
