= Zahořany =

Zahořany may refer to places in the Czech Republic:

- Zahořany (Domažlice District), a municipality and village in the Plzeň Region
- Zahořany (Prague-West District), a municipality and village in the Central Bohemian Region
- Zahořany, a village and part of Bystřice (Benešov District) in the Central Bohemian Region
- Zahořany, a village and part of Kovářov in the South Bohemian Region
- Zahořany, a village and part of Králův Dvůr in the Central Bohemian Region
- Zahořany, a village and part of Křešice in the Ústí nad Labem Region
- Zahořany, a village and part of Okrouhlo in the Central Bohemian Region
- Zahořany, a village and part of Vilémov (Chomutov District) in the Ústí nad Labem Region
