= Jaroslav Křička =

Czech composer (1882–1969)

Olympic medal record

Art competitions
Bronze medal – third place	1936 Berlin	Orchestra

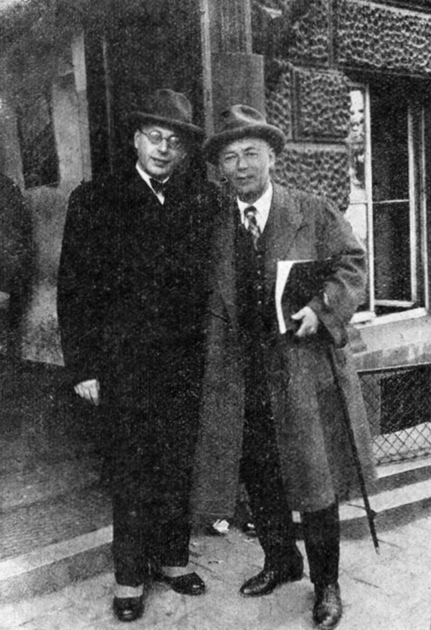
Conductor George Szell and composer Jaroslav Křička (right) during the staging of Křička's opera Bílý pán (The Gentleman in White) in Prague, April 1932

Jaroslav Křička (Czech: [ˈjaroslaf ˈkr̝̊ɪt͡ʃka]; 27 August 1882 – 23 January 1969) was a Czech composer, conductor and music teacher. He was the brother of poet Petr Křička.

== Life ==
Jaroslav Křička was born on 27 August 1882 in Kelč, Moravia, Austria-Hungary. He was born into the family of the Kelč village cantor and headmaster František Křička (1848–1891) as the oldest of three siblings. His mother was Františka Křičková (1861–1936). His brother Petr Křička (1884–1949) later became a well-known poet, and his sister Pavla Křičková (1886–1972) became a writer. Their father enthusiastically supported the musical education of his children; Jaroslav received violin, piano, and voice lessons as a child.

He attended high school in Havlíčkův Brod and graduated in 1900. As a high school student, he founded his own vocal quartet, string quartet, and student orchestra and began to compose. After graduating from high school, he moved to Prague and studied at the Prague Conservatory from 1902 to 1905. Under the tutelage of Josef Klička, he studied organ, orchestration, and harmony. He studied conducting with Karel Knittl and composition with Karel Stecker^{[cs]}. His musical role models were the famous Czech composers Antonín Dvořák, Bedřich Smetana, and Zdeněk Fibich, and later also the Czech modernists Vítězslav Novák and Josef Suk.

After studying for a year in Berlin (1905–1906), he moved to Russia for three years (1906–1909) and taught music theory, harmony, and chamber music at the Imperial Music School in Yekaterinoslav. There he founded an orchestra with which he performed works by Antonín Dvořák and Bedřich Smetana. In Russia, he developed friendships with the composers Alexander Glazunov and Sergei Tanejev. Křička was inspired by Russian poetry and music, and the work of composers Mikhail Glinka and Modest Mussorgsky particularly influenced his compositions. It was in Ekaterinoslav that he penned one of his most famous songs, "Albatross," from the cycle Severní noci (Northern Nights). Mussorgsky's song cycles for children also inspired him to compose his own children's songs.

Křička moved to Prague in 1909, and from 1911 to 1920 he directed the Prague choir Hlahol^{[cs]}. His tenure as director afforded him the opportunity to study numerous works by contemporary Czech composers such as Leoš Janáček, Vítězslav Novák, and Otakar Jeremiáš, in addition to premiering Novák's cantata Svatební košile (The Wedding Shirt), Op.48. During this period, he also began his first major work: the opera Hipolyta. From 1911 he championed his former teacher Karel Stecker at the Prague Conservatory, and after Stecker's death in 1919 he was appointed as a full professor of composition.

On 14 October 1918, he married Marie Krbová, a pianist and singer in the Hlahol choir who studied under Josef Bohuslav Foerster. Together with his student Jaroslav Řídký, Křička conducted the choir of the Czech Philharmonic from 1922 to 1930. During the critical years of World War II and the German occupation (1942–1945), he also served as rector of the Conservatory.

During his many years of teaching at the Prague Conservatory, Jaroslav Křička trained numerous composers, including Jaroslav Řídký, Karel Hába, Emil Hlobil, Karel Janeček, Václav Trojan, Ján Cikker, Jan Kapr and Jarmil Burghauser. He spent the last years of his life in the Bohemian Forest Foothills, where he dedicated himself to his composing in the village of Červené Dvorce near Sušice. He died on 23 January 1969 in Prague. He is buried at the Vyšehrad Cemetery in Prague.

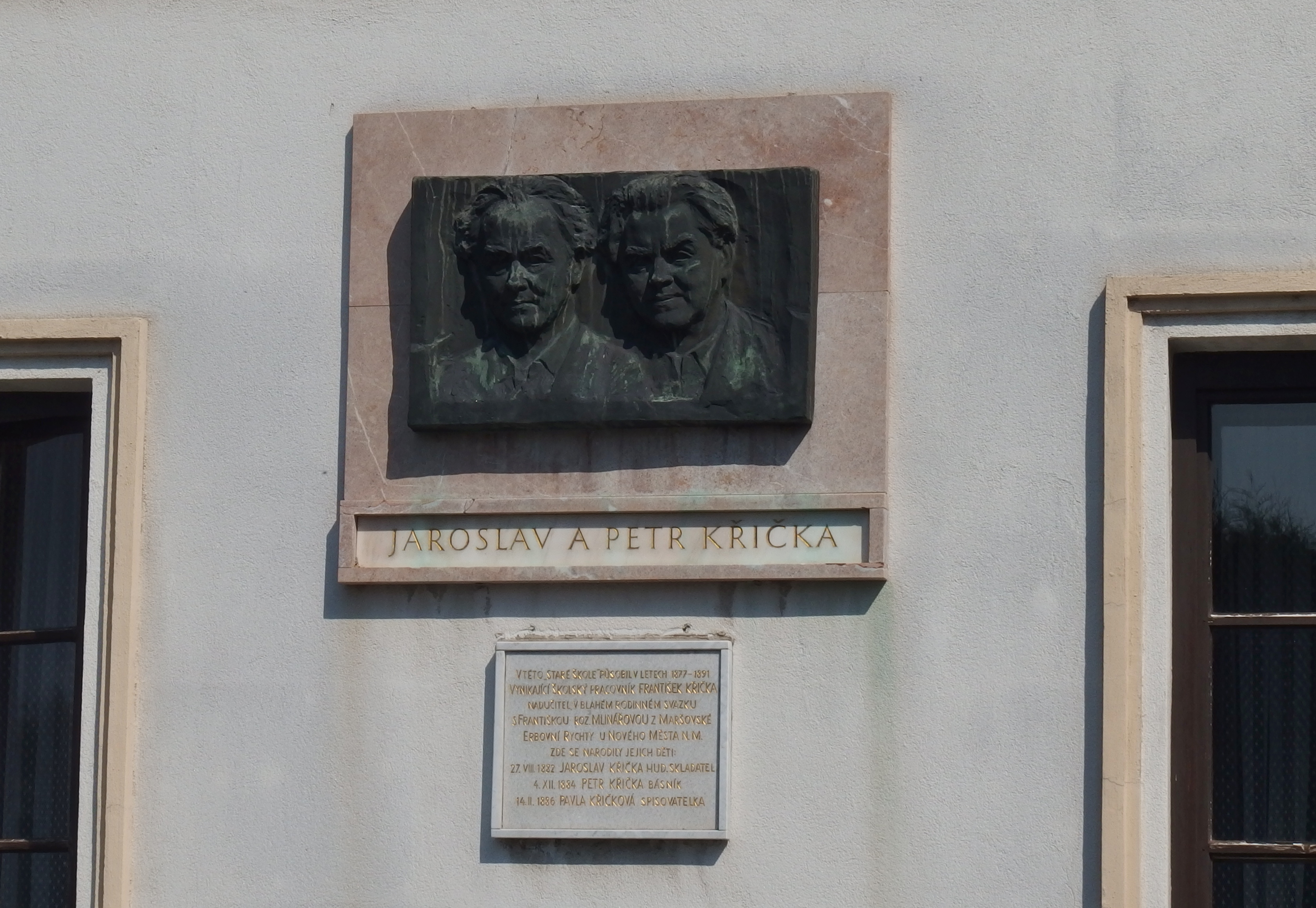
A plaque commemorating the family home of the Křička brothers in Kelč

== Honours ==
In 1936, Jaroslav Křička won a bronze medal in the art competitions of the Olympic Games for his Horácká suita (Horácko Suite a.k.a. Mountain Suite), Op. 63.

He was elected a member of the Czech Academy of Sciences and Arts in 1921, and in 1957 he received the esteemed title of Honored Artist (Zasloužilý umělec). The Křička Brothers Museum is located in his hometown of Kelč.

== Works ==
Jaroslav Křička's work encompasses almost all musical genres, in his words, “from passions to operetta,” with a distinct emphasis on vocal compositions. In addition to song cycles and cantatas, he also composed operas, operettas, incidental music, symphonies, string quartets, and chamber music works. His compositions for children were significant and unique for his time; he wrote numerous children's song cycles and the first Czech children's opera, Ogaři (1918). At the end of the silent film era, Křička began composing film scores; in 1929, he wrote the music for the historical film Svatý Václav, which commemorated one thousand years since the death of the Bohemian ruler Wenceslaus I. He began composing operettas after 1945.

In addition to his musical compositions, Křička wrote many treatises on music and published regularly in the music periodicals Hudební revue and Hudební rozhledy.

=== Song cycles ===
- Severní noci (Northern Nights), Op. 14 (1909/1910), four songs based on poetry by Konstantin Balmont
  - 1. Albatros (Albatross)
  - 2. Labuť (Swan)
  - 3. Ukolébavka (Lullaby)
  - 4. U skandinávských skal (By the cliffs of Scandinavia)
- O lásce a smrti (On Love and Death), Op. 15 (1910), four songs on texts by Konstantin Balmont
- Písně rozchodu (Farewell Songs), Op. 19 (1916), four songs based on texts by Otakar Theer^{[cs]}
- Tři bajky pro soprán a klavír (Three Fables for soprano and piano), (1917), based on fairytales by Božena Němcová and Alexander Afanasyev's fables
- Jaro pacholátko (Spring Child), Op. 29 (1919), three recitatives for high voice and piano
- Jiříčkovy písničky (Little Jiří's Songs), Op. 36 (1917, 1922-1923), collection of children's songs
- Daniny písničky a říkadla (Dana's Songs and Rhymes), Op. 49 (1928), children's songs and rhymes for toddlers
- Míšovy písničky (Míša's Songs) (1932), collection of children's songs
- Naše paní Božena Němcová (Our Lady Božena Němcová), Op. 112 (1954), five songs for mezzo-soprano and orchestra based on texts by František Halas.

=== Cantatas ===
- Pokušení na poušti (Temptation in the Desert), Op. 34 (1922), cantata for soli, choir, orchestra, and organ based on the Gospel of Matthew (text from the Kralice Bible)
- Studentské vzpomínky (Student Memories), cantata for soli, choir, and orchestra
- Tyrolské elegie (Tyrolean Elegies), Op. 52 (1930), cantata for soli, male choir, and orchestra based on a poem by Karel Havlíček Borovský
- Moravská kantáta (Moravian Cantata), Op. 65 (1935) for mixed choir, soli, and orchestra
- Valašská jitřní mše (Wallachian Morning Mass) (1941) for soli, mixed choir, and orchestra on a text by František Táborský
- Requiem in memoriam fratris dilectissimi, op. 96 (1949) in memory of his brother Petr Křička

=== Orchestral works ===
- 1. Symphony in D minor ("Jarní") (1905), "Spring Symphony"
- 2nd symphony in a minor ("Letní") (1907), "Summer Symphony"
- Modrý pták (Blue Bird), Op. 16 (1911), overture to the fairytale play by Maurice Maeterlinck.
- Adventus, Op. 33 (1921)
- Horácká suita (Horácko Suite a.k.a. Mountain Suite), Op. 63 (1936) won 3rd prize in the composition competition in the 1936 Summer Olympics

=== Chamber music ===
- 1st String Quartet in D major ("Ruský") (1907), "Russian String Quartet"
- Divertimento Novodvorico (1921), serenade for string quartet
- Sonata in E minor for violin and piano ("Památce Jana Štursy"), Op. 40 (1925), "In Memory of Jan Štursa"
- Piano Trio ("Malé domácí trio"), Op. 38 (1934), "Little domestic trio"
- 2nd String Quartet in E minor (1938)
- 3rd String Quartet ("Valašský") (1949), "Wallachian String Quartet"

=== Stage works ===
- Zmoudření Dona Quijota (Don Quixote Gains His Wisdom), Op. 18 (1914), music for the stage play by Viktor Dyk
- Hipolyta (Hippolyta), Op. 20 (1916), opera (premiered at the National Theatre in Prague on 10 October 1917)
- Ogaři (The Boys), Op. 27 (1918), children's opera based on texts by Ozef Kalda
- Bílý pán aneb Těžko se dnes duchům straší (The Gentleman in White, or It's Tough Scaring Ghosts Today), Op. 50 (1929), musical comedy based on Oscar Wilde's short story "The Canterville Ghost"
- Tlustý pradědeček, lupiči a detektývové aneb Dobře to dopadlo (The Fat Great-Grandpa, the Robbers, and the Detectives, or It Turned Out Well), Op. 56 (1932), children's Singspiel
- České jesličky (Czech Nativity), Op. 69 (1937), Christmas Singspiel
- Hra na květinky. A-o-i-e-u, jaro již je tu! (A Flower Play. A-E-I-O-U, Spring is upon us!), Op. 71 (1937), Singspiel for children's choirs
- Král Lávra (King Lávra), Op. 73 (1939), sung ballet based on a poem by Karel Havlíček Borovský
- Psaníčko na cestách aneb Pošťácká pohádka (A Letter on A Journey, or The Postman's Fairy Tale), Op. 79 (1941), children's Singspiel based on a fairy tale by Karel Čapek
- Jáchym a Juliana (Joachim and Julianna), Op. 90 (1948), opera
- Zahořanský hon (The Hunt of Zahořany), Op. 98a (1949), musical comedy based on a story by Alois Jirásek
- Český Paganini aneb Slavík a Chopin (Czech Paganini, or Slavík and Chopin) (1951), operetta
- Kolébka (The Cradle), Op. 101 (1950), musical comedy with songs and dances based on a story by Alois Jirásek
- Tichý dům (The Silent House), Op. 105 (1952), operetta based on a story by Jan Neruda
- Polka vítězí (The Polka Wins), Op. 111 (1954), operetta
- Cirkus Humberto (Circus Humberto), Op. 118 (1955), operetta
- Kalhoty (The Pants) (1962), Singspiel
- Pohádka o 12 měsíčkách (Fairy Tale of the 12 Months) (1962), Singspiel for school children based on a fairy tale by Božena Němcová
- Dvě komedie televizní: 1. Měsíc divů; 2. Šlechetný kasař aneb s poctivostí nejdál dojdeš (Two TV Comedies: 1. The Month of Marvels; 2. The Noble Safecracker, or Honesty is the Best Policy) (1963), two opera miniatures

=== Film music ===
- Svatý Václav (1929)
- Naši furianti (1937)
- Cech panen kutnohorských (1938)
- Gabriela (1942)
- Jarní píseň (1944)
- Nikola Šuhaj (1947)
- Štika v rybníce (1951)
