= Keltz =

Keltz may refer to:

- Kielce, Poland
- Keltz Arena, a sports gymnasium for University of Montana Western
- Jonathan Keltz, American actor
- James Keltz, husband to news reporter Jennie Bond
- Kelč, a town in the Czech Republic

== See also ==
- Celts
- Keltzene, former name of Erzincan, a city in Turkey
