= Horácko =

- Cultural and ethnographic region
- Location in the Czech Republic
- Country: Czech Republic
- Regions: Vysočina Region, parts of South Moravian and South Bohemian regions
- Seat: Jihlava
- Boroughs: Podhorácko, Northern Highlands, Jihlava Highlands, Southern Highlands
- Time zone: UTC+1 (CET)
  - Summer (DST): UTC+2 (CEST)

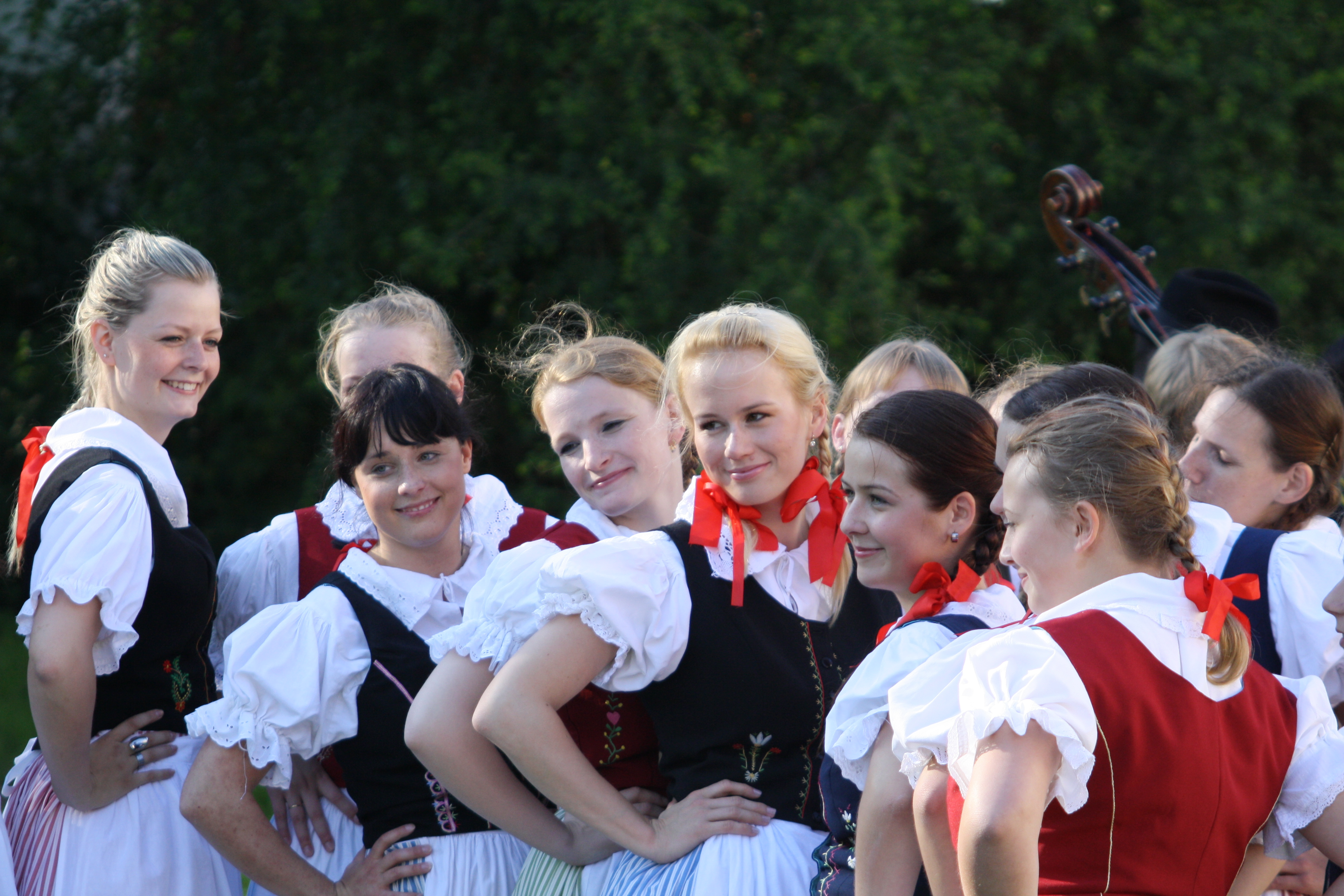
Dance ensemble dressed in traditional folk costumes of the Horácko region

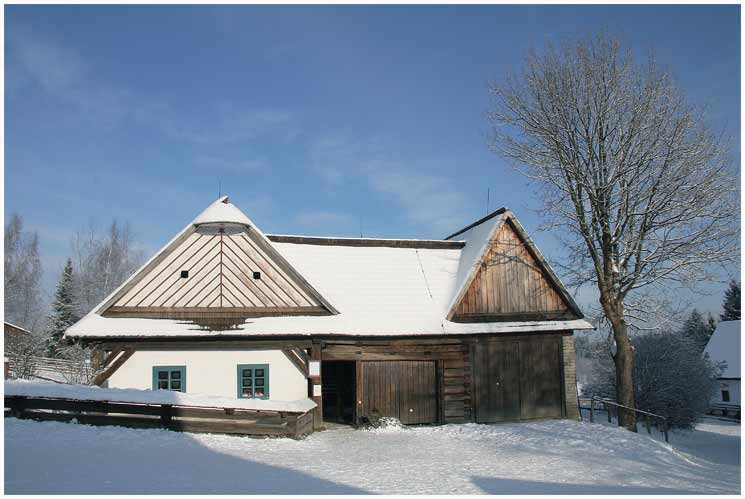
Veselý kopec Museum with traditional buildings of Horácko

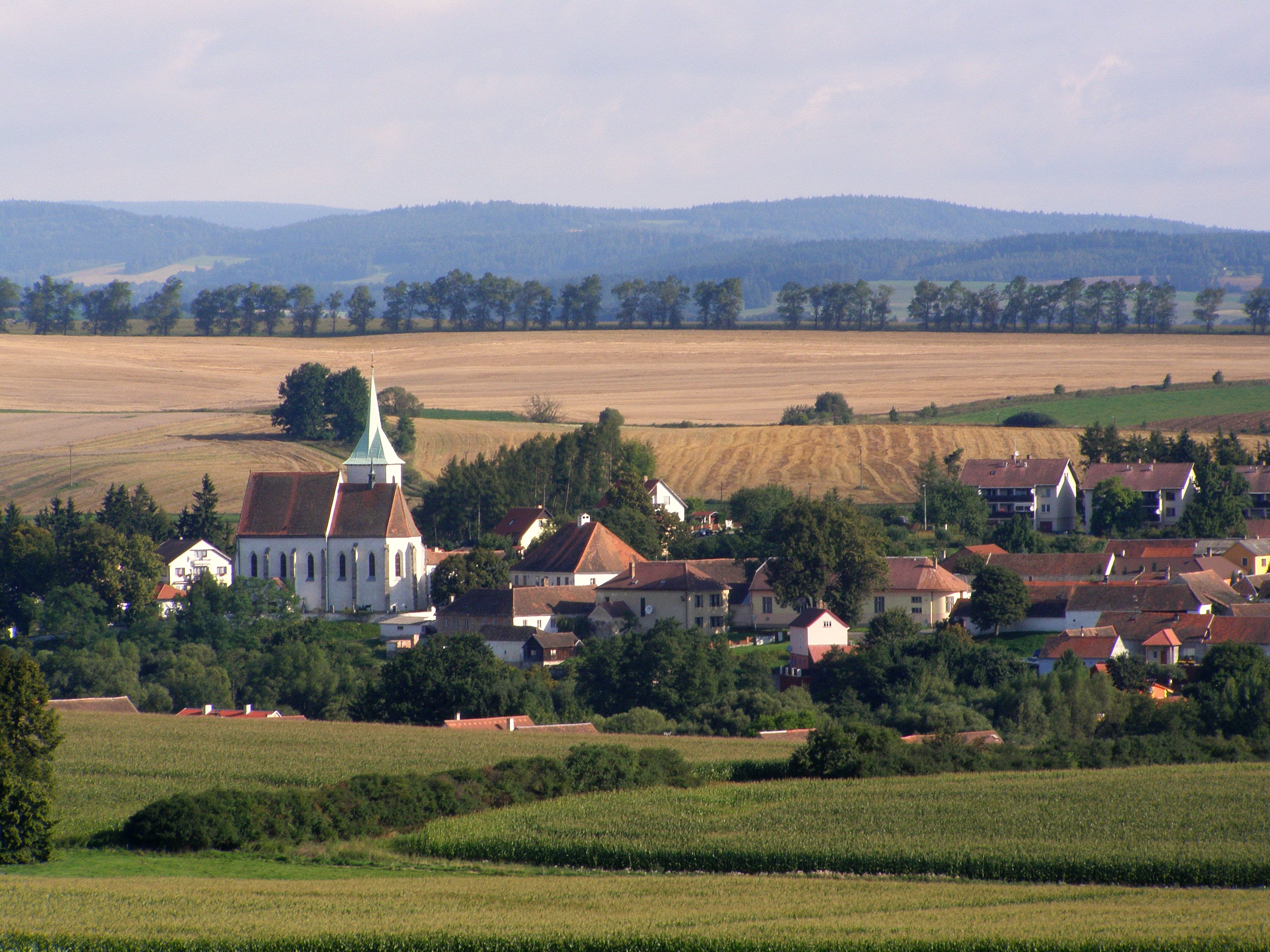
Cizkrajov – example of Horácko landscape

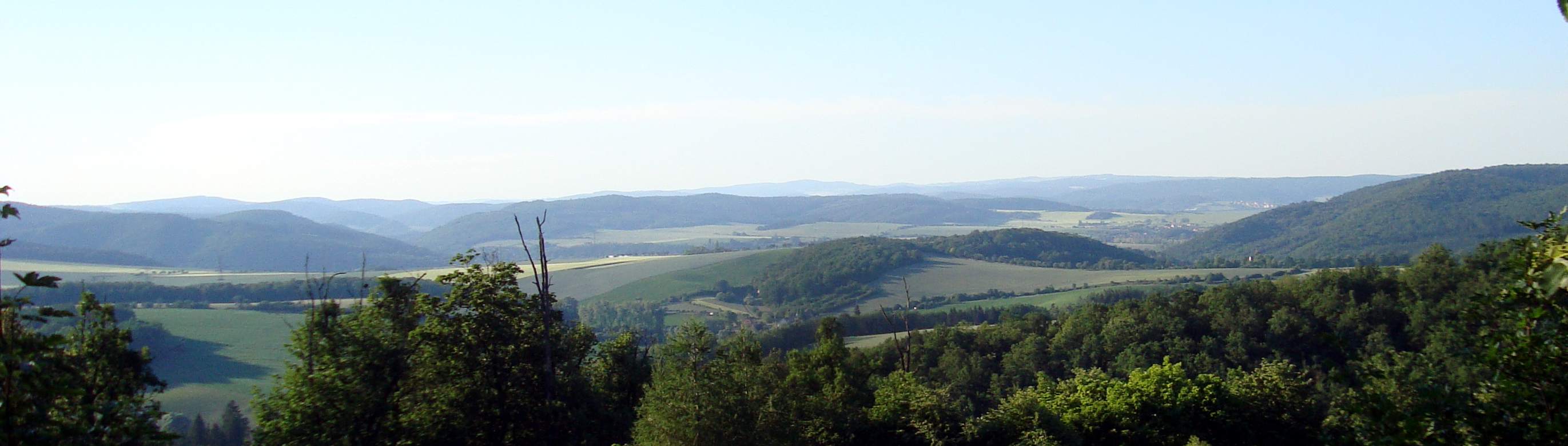
Eastern part of Horácko

Horácko is a cultural and ethnographic region in the southeast Bohemia and southwest Moravia and middle part of present-day Czech Republic.

== Geography ==
The area forms the eastern part of the administrative region of Vysočina and small parts of South Moravian and South Bohemian regions. Horácko is divided into several subregions, with the main parts being Northern Highlands, Jihlava Highlands, Southern Highlands and Low Highlands (Czech: Podhorácko).

Its most important centre is the city of Jihlava which is located on the Bohemian-Moravian border. Other important centres include Velké Meziříčí, Žďár nad Sázavou, Třebíč, Telč, Dačice, Slavonice, Moravské Budějovice and Moravský Krumlov.

The northern and western parts of the region form rolling, densely forested, hilly country with traditional wooden rural architecture. Some timbered cottages are now used as weekend-houses. In keeping with the character of the landscape and the available local raw materials, industry is concentrated on woodwork, iron ore and stone processing, and manufacture of glass and textiles.

== Agriculture ==
In the Southern Highlands agriculture has been focused on cattle breeding and fish farming. Farming prevails across the entire territory, especially in the fertile areas in the southern part of Low Highlands. In difficult mountainous areas, only resistant strains of corn, fodder plants and especially flax and potatoes can be grown.

== Notable people ==
- Josef Hoffmann, architect
- Saint Zdislava Berka, altruist
- Jan Kubiš, soldier, member of Operation Anthropoid
- Gustav Mahler, composer
- Ludvík Svoboda, president of Czechoslovakia
- Joseph Schumpeter, economist and political scientist

== Literature ==
- B. Pernica: Lidové umění výtvarné. Horácko – Podhorácko. Havlíčkův Brod 1954. (in Czech)
- J. Dufek: Naše Horácko jindy a nyní, Velké Meziříčí 1893. (in Czech)
- J. Kopáč: Bývalý horácký kroj Vysočiny českomoravské v Čechách, Humpolec 1929. (in Czech)
- V. Kovářů - J. Kuča: Venkovské stavby na Moravském Horácku, Nové Město na Moravě - Tišnov 2009. (in Czech)
- J. Mátlová - Divoká: Horácký kroj z Telečska, Dačicka a Třešťska. Ženský kroj, Prague-Jihlava 1983. (in Czech)
- J. F. Svoboda: Horácká osada, Nové Město na Moravě 1928. (in Czech)
- J. F. Svoboda: Moravské Horácko. Lidové umění výtvarné, Prague 1930. (in Czech)
- J. F. Svoboda: Moravské Horácko, Jihlava 1940 (in Czech)
- V. Svobodová: O lidovém kroji na Moravském Horácku, Nové Město na Moravě 1977. (in Czech)
