= Keblov =

- Municipality
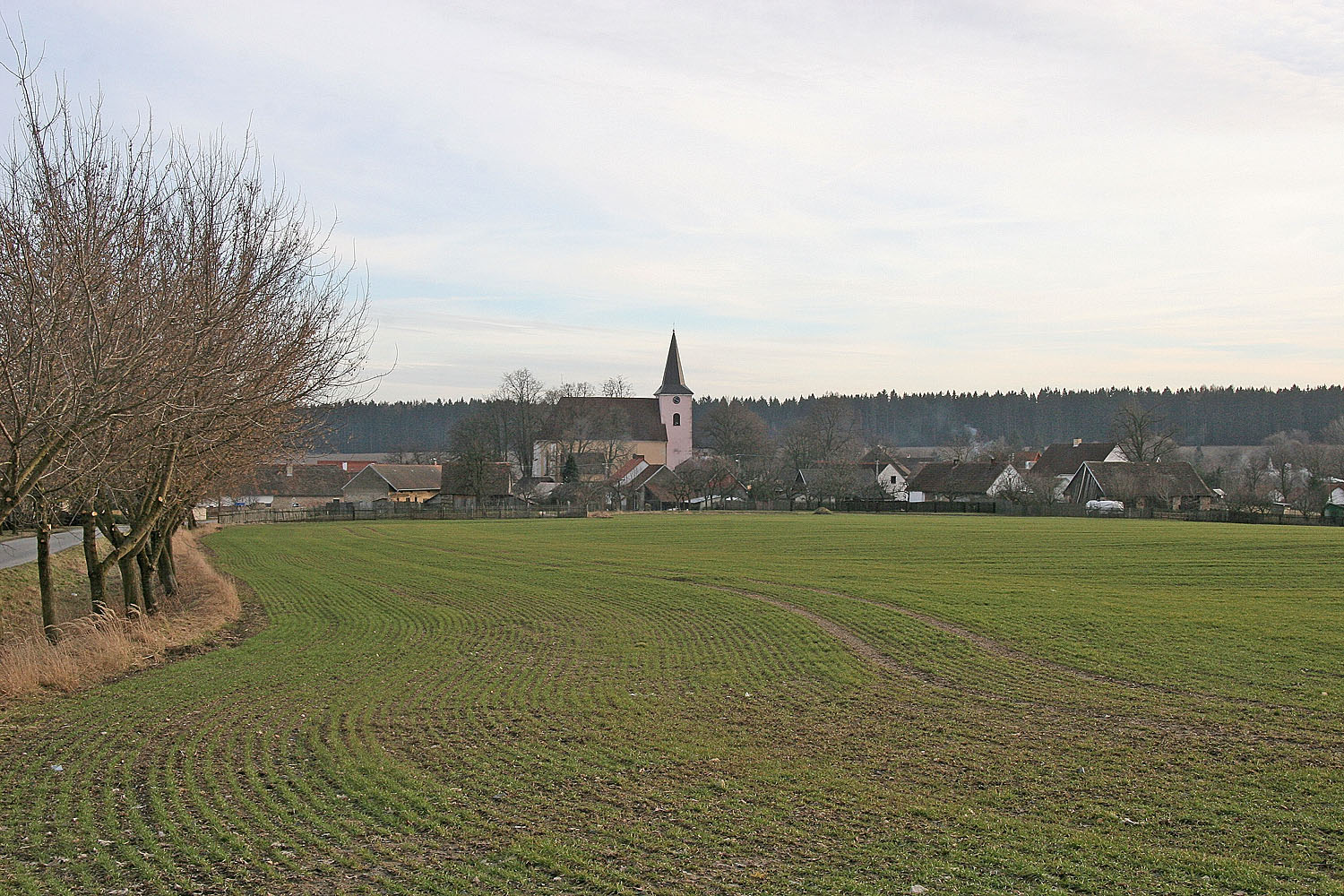
- View from the north

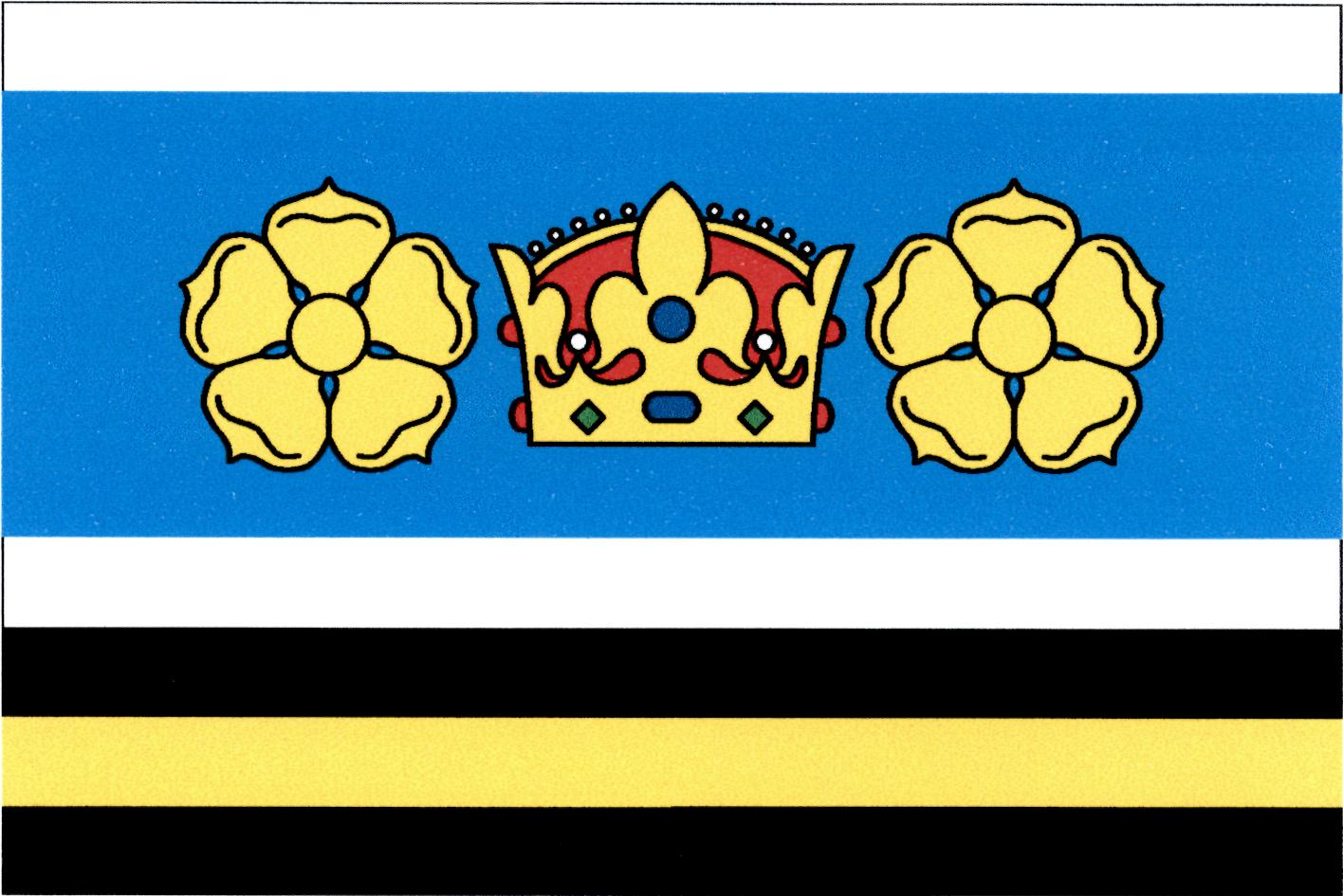
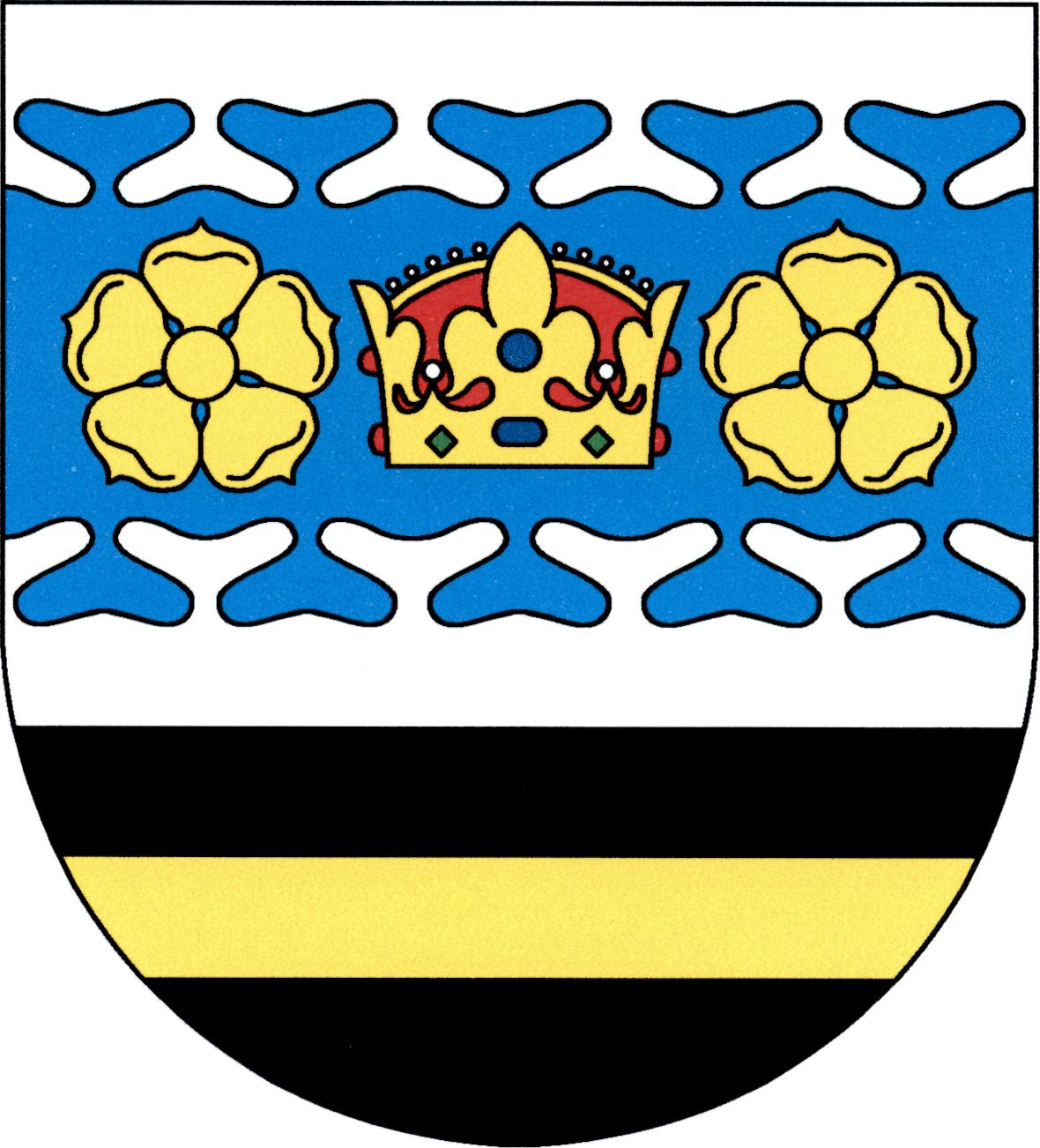
- Flag Coat of arms

- Location in the Czech Republic
- Coordinates: 49°40′40″N 15°4′19″E
- Country: Czech Republic
- Region: Central Bohemian
- District: Benešov
- First mentioned: 1290

Area
  - Total: 7.11 km^{2} (2.75 sq mi)
- Elevation: 436 m (1,430 ft)

Population (2026-01-01)
  - Total: 188
  - Density: 26.4/km^{2} (68.5/sq mi)
- Time zone: UTC+1 (CET)
  - Summer (DST): UTC+2 (CEST)
- Postal code: 257 65
- Website: www.obeckeblov.cz

Keblov is a municipality and village in Benešov District in the Central Bohemian Region of the Czech Republic. It has about 200 inhabitants.

== Administrative division ==
Keblov consists of two municipal parts (in brackets population according to the 2021 census):

- Keblov (165)
- Sedlice (22)

== Etymology ==
The name Keblov is derived from the surname Kebl, meaning "Kebl's (court)".

== Geography ==
Keblov is located about 30 kilometres (19 mi) southeast of Benešov. It lies in the Vlašim Uplands. The highest point is the hill Hůrka at 459 m (1,506 ft) above sea level. The municipal territory is situated on the shores of the Švihov and Němčice reservoirs.

== History ==
The first written mention of Keblov is from 1290, when it was a property of the Prague bishops. In 1436, it was acquired by the Trčka of Lípa noble family. After they sold the village in 1547, its owners changed frequently. In the 17th century, the village of Sedlice was annexed to Keblov. In 1703, Keblov was bought by Count John Leopold of Trautson and Falkenstein, who annexed the village to the Křivsoudov estate.

== Demographics ==
Historical population

Year	Pop.	±%
1869	438	—
1880	497	+13.5%
1890	477	−4.0%
1900	477	+0.0%
1910	485	+1.7%

Year	Pop.	±%
1921	470	−3.1%
1930	449	−4.5%
1950	328	−26.9%
1961	307	−6.4%
1970	285	−7.2%

Year	Pop.	±%
1980	255	−10.5%
1991	204	−20.0%
2001	203	−0.5%
2011	175	−13.8%
2021	187	+6.9%

Source: Censuses

== Transport ==
There are no railways or major roads passing through the municipality. The D1 motorway runs along the northern municipal border just outside the municipal territory.

== Sights ==
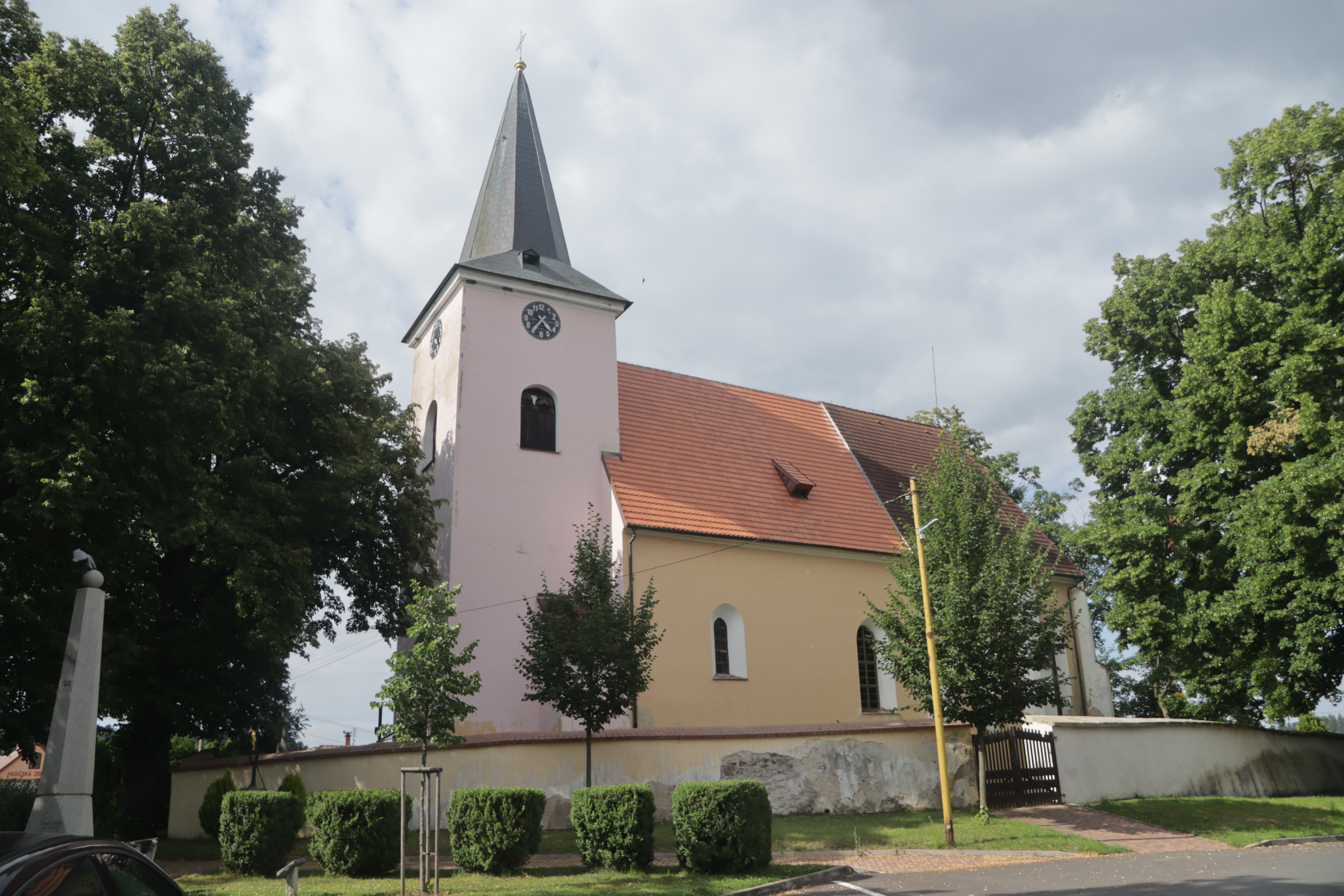
Church of the Assumption of the Virgin Mary

The main landmark of Keblov is the parish Church of the Assumption of the Virgin Mary. The Gothic church is as old as the village. It was destroyed by a fire in 1895 and rebuilt in 1897.
