= Cizkrajov =

- Municipality
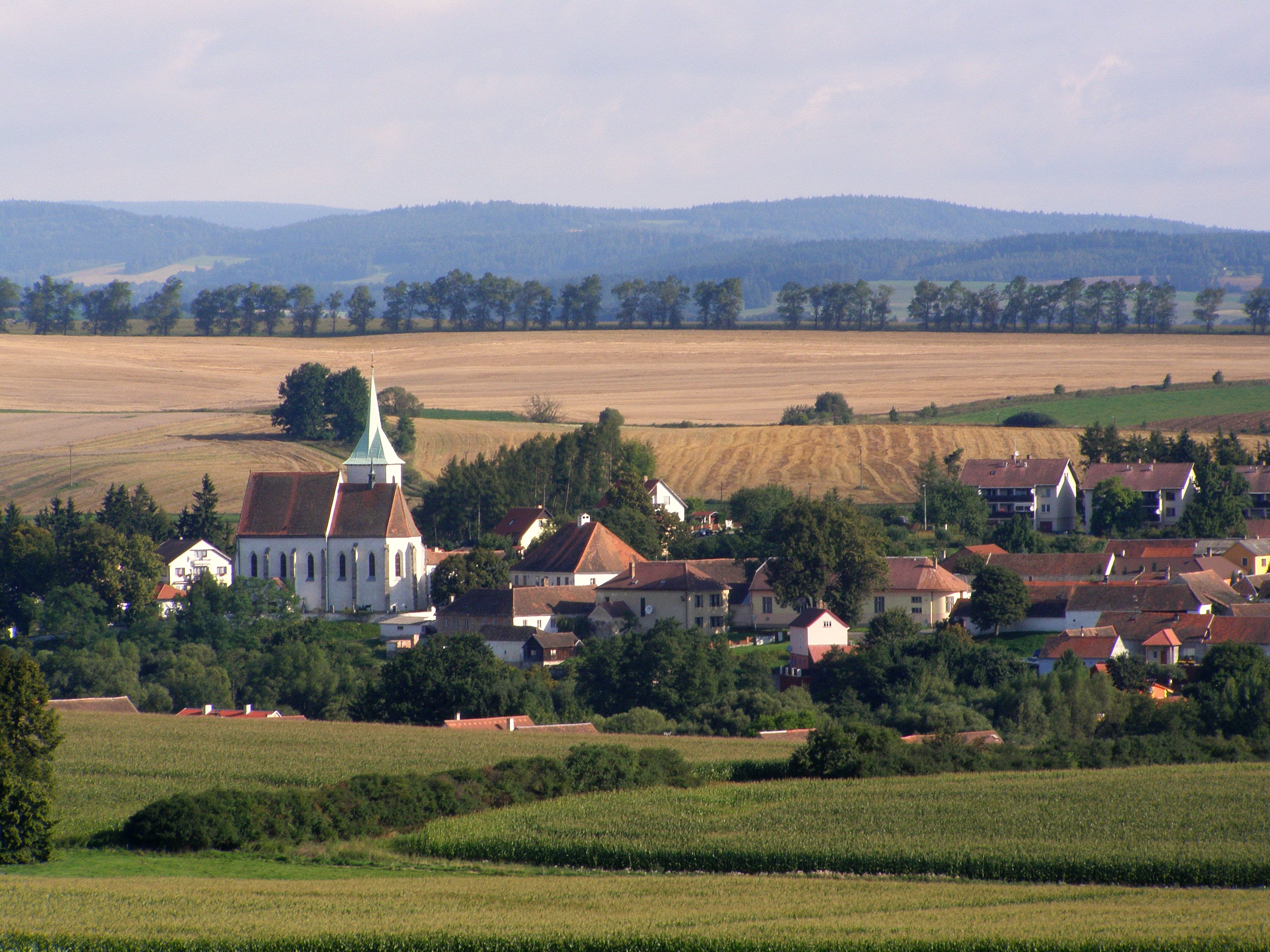
- General view

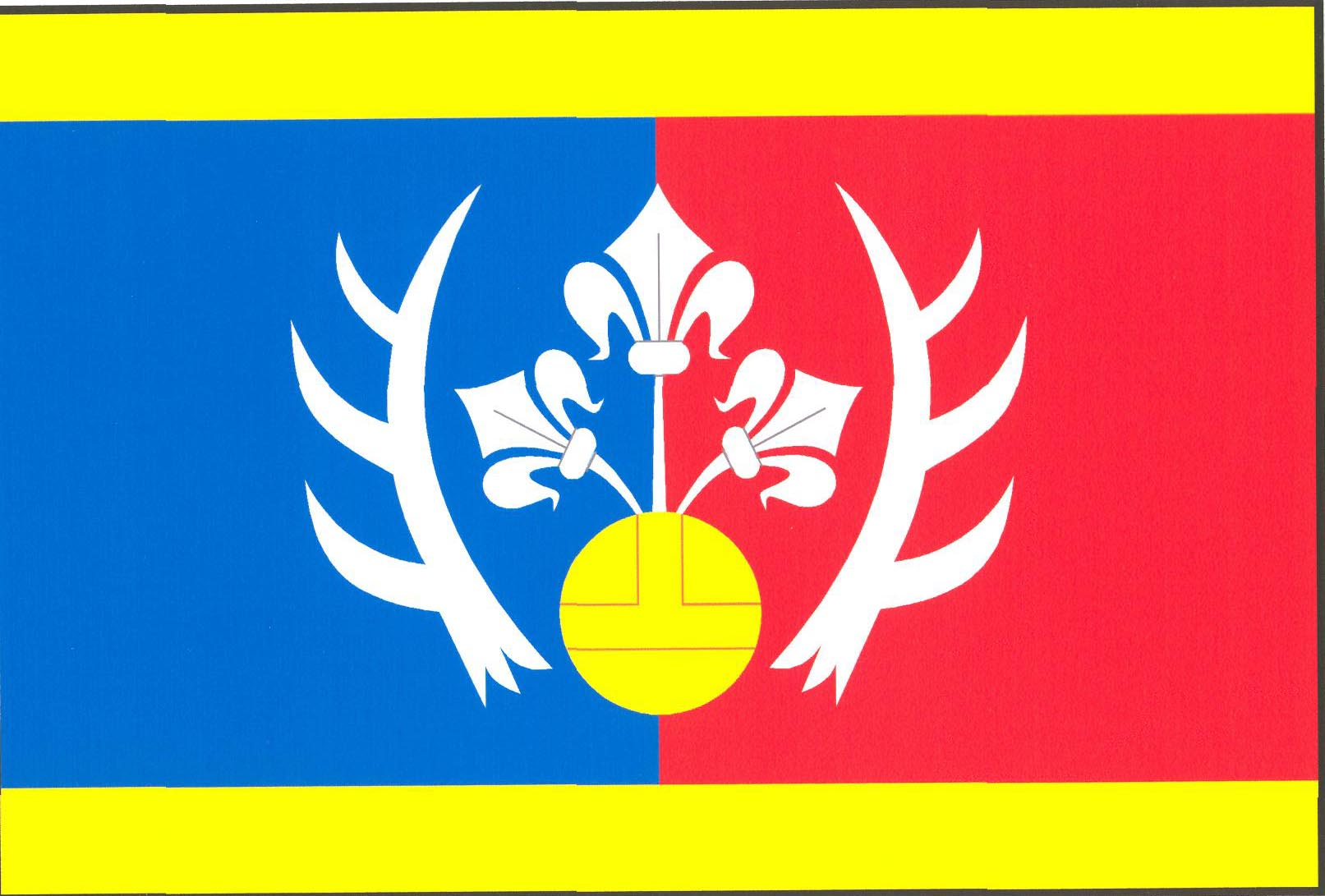
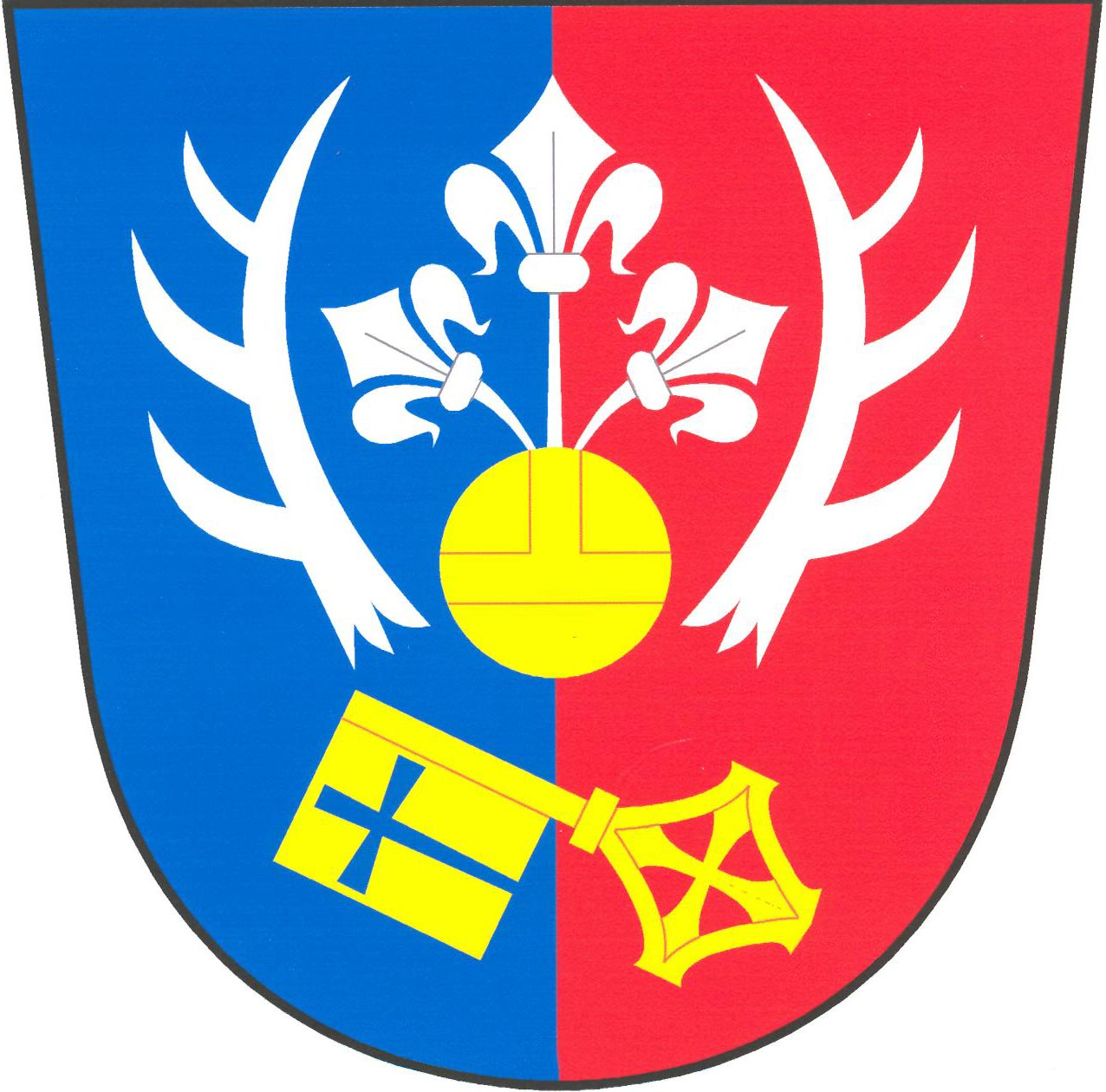
- Flag Coat of arms

- Location in the Czech Republic
- Coordinates: 49°1′50″N 15°23′23″E
- Country: Czech Republic
- Region: South Bohemian
- District: Jindřichův Hradec
- First mentioned: 1301

Area
  - Total: 25.76 km^{2} (9.95 sq mi)
- Elevation: 477 m (1,565 ft)

Population (2026-01-01)
  - Total: 513
  - Density: 19.9/km^{2} (51.6/sq mi)
- Time zone: UTC+1 (CET)
  - Summer (DST): UTC+2 (CEST)
- Postal code: 378 81
- Website: www.cizkrajov.cz

Cizkrajov (German: Sitzgras) is a municipality and village in Jindřichův Hradec District in the South Bohemian Region of the Czech Republic. It has about 500 inhabitants.

== Administrative division ==
Cizkrajov consists of four municipal parts (in brackets population according to the 2021 census):

- Cizkrajov (297)
- Dolní Bolíkov (86)
- Holešice (43)
- Mutná (65)

== History ==
The first written mention of Cizkrajov is from 1301. The village was founded at the turn of the 12th and 13th centuries.

== Demographics ==
Historical population
Year	Pop.	±%
1869	1,166	—
1880	1,142	−2.1%
1890	1,104	−3.3%
1900	1,090	−1.3%
1910	1,022	−6.2%
1921	1,033	+1.1%
1930	1,033	+0.0%
1950	761	−26.3%
1961	769	+1.1%
1970	698	−9.2%
1980	592	−15.2%
1991	582	−1.7%
2001	578	−0.7%
2011	505	−12.6%
2021	491	−2.8%
Source: Censuses
