= Sedlice (Příbram District) =

- Municipality
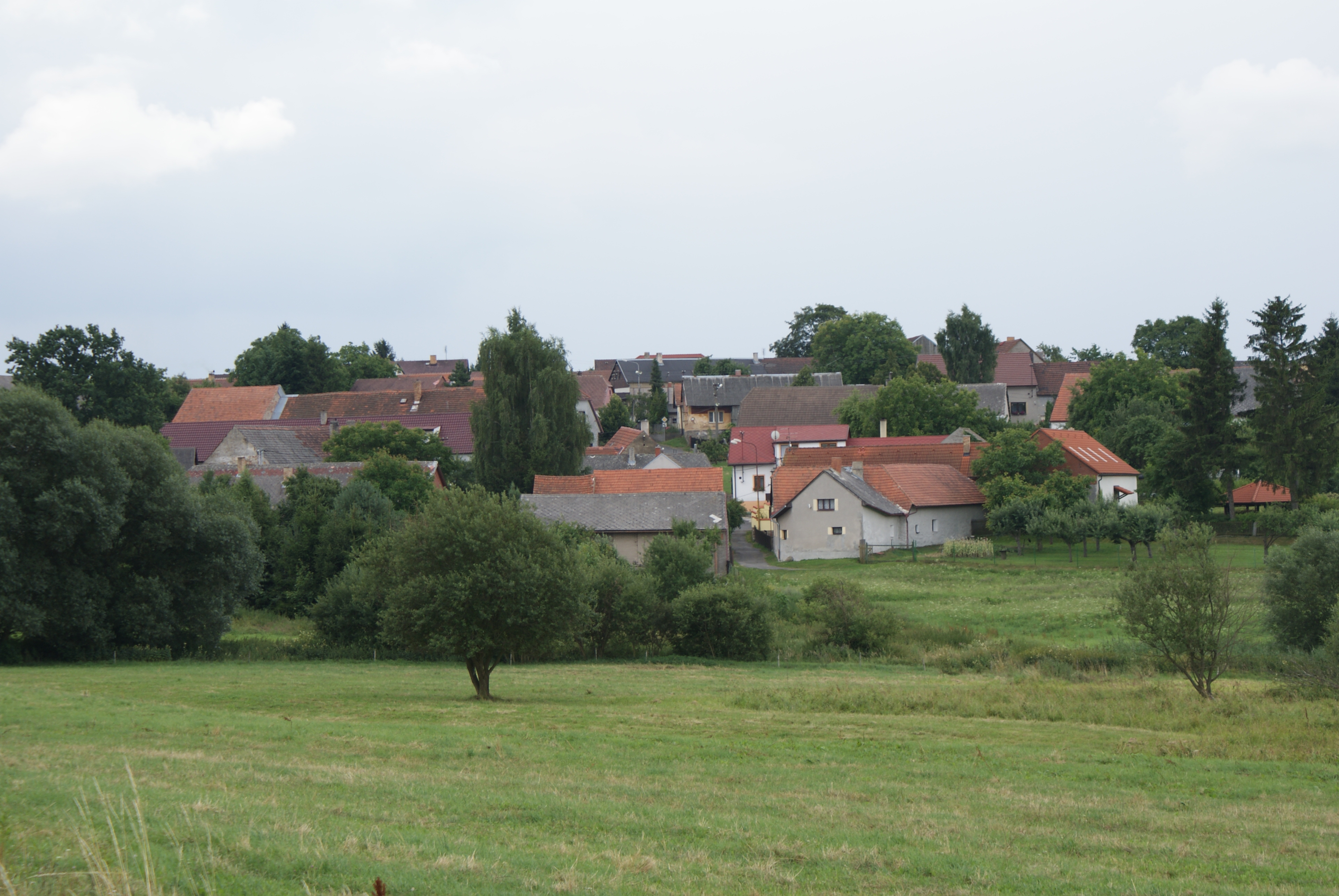
- Hoděmyšl, a part of Sedlice

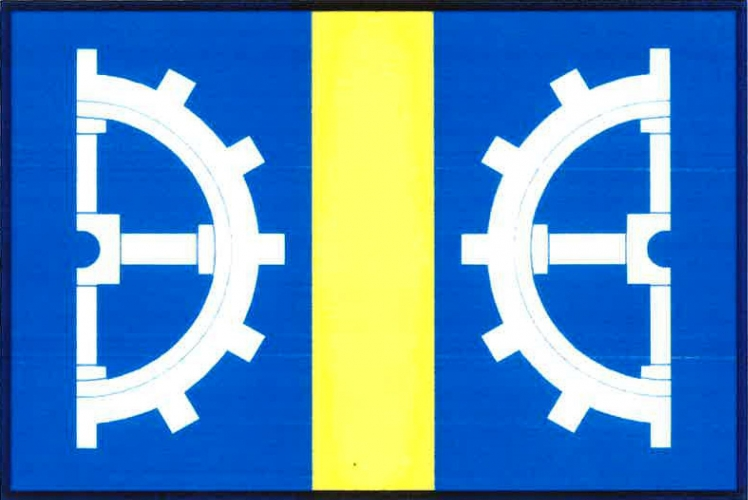
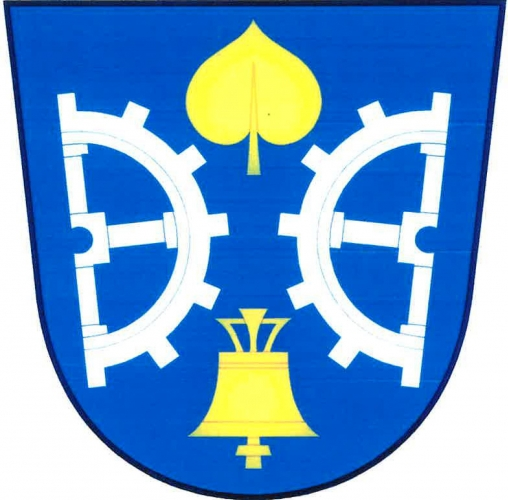
- Flag Coat of arms

- Location in the Czech Republic
- Coordinates: 49°37′19″N 13°52′51″E
- Country: Czech Republic
- Region: Central Bohemian
- District: Příbram
- First mentioned: 1349

Area
  - Total: 5.72 km^{2} (2.21 sq mi)
- Elevation: 550 m (1,800 ft)

Population (2026-01-01)
  - Total: 277
  - Density: 48.4/km^{2} (125/sq mi)
- Time zone: UTC+1 (CET)
  - Summer (DST): UTC+2 (CEST)
- Postal code: 262 42
- Website: www.sedlice-obec.cz

Sedlice is a municipality and village in Příbram District in the Central Bohemian Region of the Czech Republic. It has about 300 inhabitants.

== Administrative division ==
Sedlice consists of two municipal parts (in brackets population according to the 2021 census):

- Sedlice (150)
- Hoděmyšl (113)

== Demographics ==
Historical population
| Year | Pop. | ±% |
|---|---|---|
| 1869 | 489 | — |
| 1880 | 538 | +10.0% |
| 1890 | 538 | +0.0% |
| 1900 | 528 | −1.9% |
| 1910 | 517 | −2.1% |
| 1921 | 497 | −3.9% |
| 1930 | 422 | −15.1% |
| 1950 | 339 | −19.7% |
| 1961 | 337 | −0.6% |
| 1970 | 268 | −20.5% |
| 1980 | 226 | −15.7% |
| 1991 | 203 | −10.2% |
| 2001 | 207 | +2.0% |
| 2011 | 231 | +11.6% |
| 2021 | 263 | +13.9% |
Source: Censuses
