= Kelč =

- Town
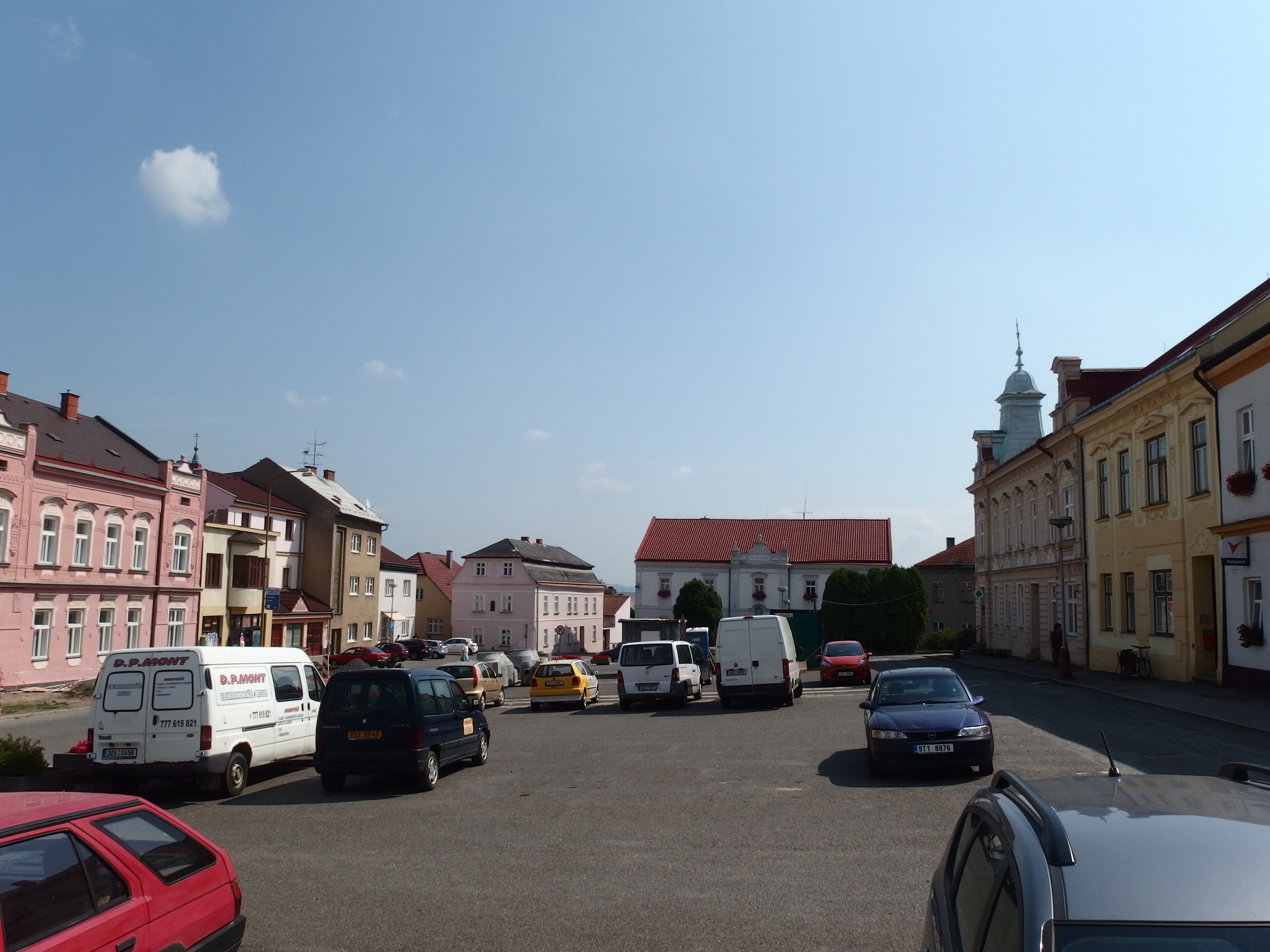
- Town square

- Flag Coat of arms

- Location in the Czech Republic
- Coordinates: 49°28′42″N 17°48′55″E
- Country: Czech Republic
- Region: Zlín
- District: Vsetín
- First mentioned: 1131

Government
  - Mayor: Karel David

Area
  - Total: 27.84 km^{2} (10.75 sq mi)
- Elevation: 307 m (1,007 ft)

Population (2026-01-01)
  - Total: 2,700
  - Density: 97/km^{2} (250/sq mi)
- Time zone: UTC+1 (CET)
  - Summer (DST): UTC+2 (CEST)
- Postal code: 756 43
- Website: www.kelc.cz

Kelč (Czech pronunciation: [kɛltʃ]; German: Keltsch) is a town in Vsetín District in the Zlín Region of the Czech Republic. It has about 2,700 inhabitants. It is located in the Moravian-Silesian Foothills.

Kelč was already a town in the Middle Ages, but it lost its town status twice. The historic town centre is well preserved and is protected as an urban monument zone. Among the main landmarks of Kelč are the Kelč Castle and the Church of Saints Peter and Paul.

== Administrative division ==
Kelč consists of five municipal parts (in brackets population according to the 2021 census):

- Kelč (1,936)
- Babice (101)
- Komárovice (150)
- Lhota (137)
- Němetice (254)

== Etymology ==
According to older theories, the name of the settlement was derived from the personal name Kelek or Keleč, but this theory was disproved. The name of the settlement is derived from the Slavic (including modern Czech) word kel, which means 'tusk'. According to Ptolemy's map, the predecessor of Kelč was a settlement called Eburum, whose name came from the Latin ebur ('mammoth tusk'), and later Slavic settlers probably derived the name of the new settlement from the old name.

== Geography ==
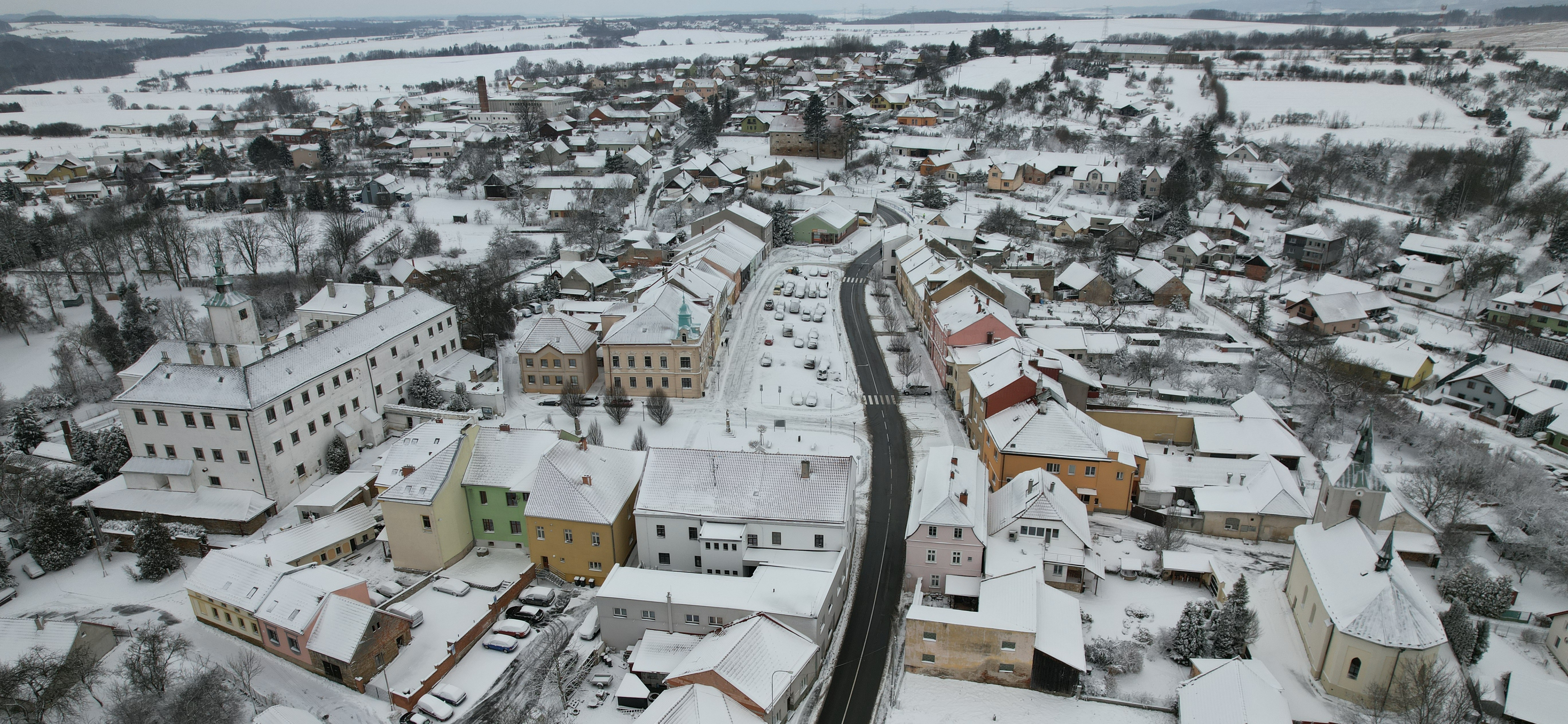
Aerial view

Kelč is located about 20 kilometres (12 mi) northwest of Vsetín and 29 km (18 mi) northeast of Zlín. It lies in an agricultural landscape in the Moravian-Silesian Foothills. The highest point is at 412 m (1,352 ft) above sea level. The town is situated on the left bank of the Juhyně Stream.

== History ==
The first written mention of Kelč is from 1131, when it was owned by the Olomouc diocese. The greatest development occurred from 1251 during the rule of bishop Bruno von Schauenburg, who had the space around the parish church rearranged, and founded a new town part called "New Kelč" around the new town square.

Kelč was severely affected by wars between Jobst of Moravia and Prokop of Moravia in the late 14th century, and by the Hussite Wars in the 15th century. The town recovered in the 16th century and a brewery was founded, which became a major source of income for the townspeople. The prosperity ended with the Thirty Years' War, when the town was burned and looted several times and the population decreased by 80%. Kelč became insignificant and lost its town title. The village was restored the title of town until the end of the 18th century.

In the early 19th century, Kelč was known for its production of tobacco pipes. In the second half of the 19th century, branches of furniture-making companies of Jacob & Josef Kohn and Gebrüder Thonet were established in Kelč, however, Kelč was not a very industrial town. With restructuring after World War II, Kelč again lost its town status. The status of the town was restored only in 1994.

== Demographics ==
Historical population

Year	Pop.	±%
1869	3,320	—
1880	3,593	+8.2%
1890	3,504	−2.5%
1900	3,282	−6.3%
1910	3,277	−0.2%

Year	Pop.	±%
1921	3,063	−6.5%
1930	3,048	−0.5%
1950	2,775	−9.0%
1961	2,820	+1.6%
1970	2,625	−6.9%

Year	Pop.	±%
1980	2,479	−5.6%
1991	2,599	+4.8%
2001	2,581	−0.7%
2011	2,587	+0.2%
2021	2,578	−0.3%

Source: Censuses

== Transport ==
There are no railways or major roads passing through the municipal territory. The II/439 road connects the town with Hranice and Kunovice.

== Sights ==
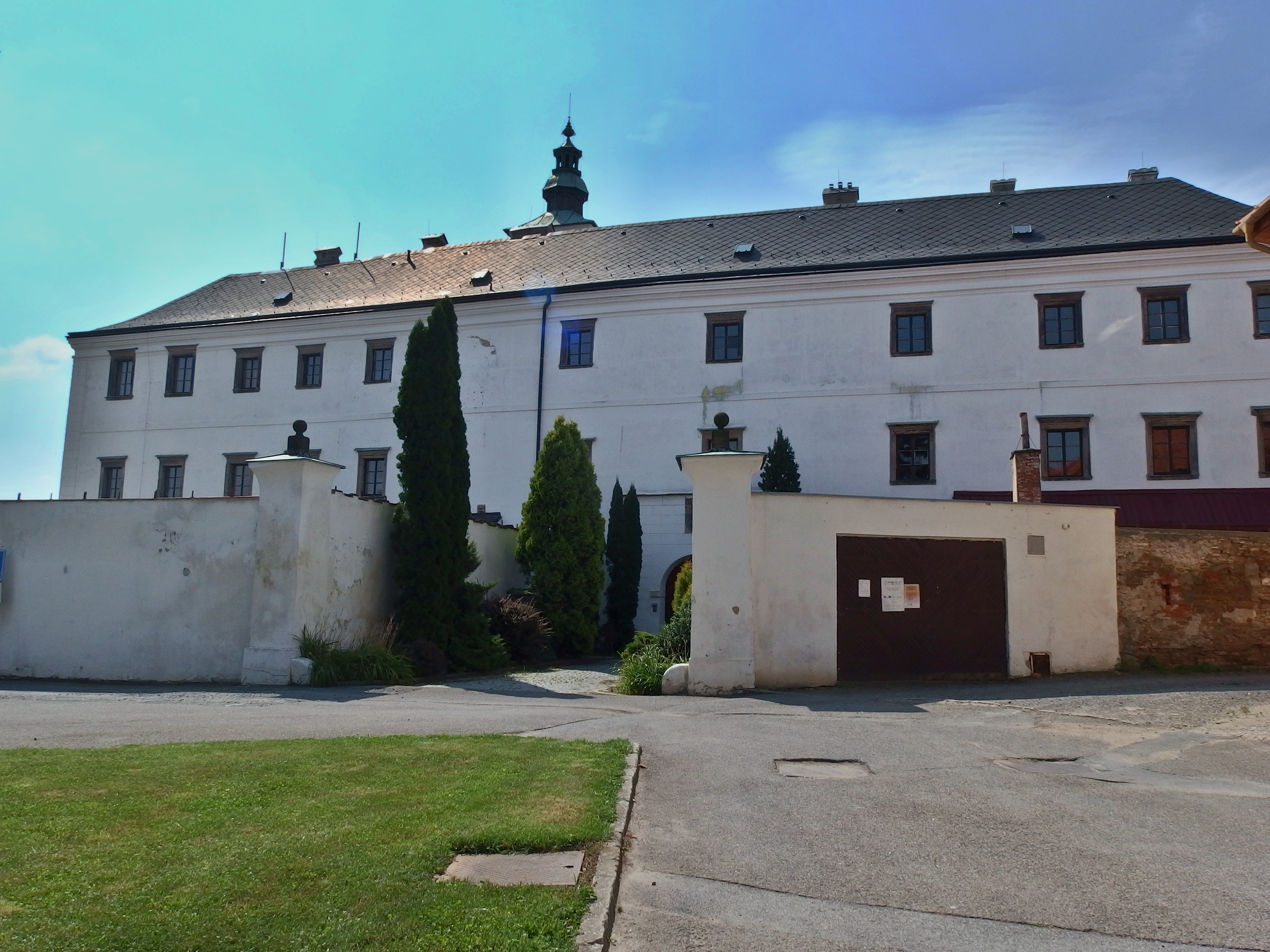
Kelč Castle

The main landmark of Kelč is the Kelč Castle. The originally late Gothic castle, built in 1585–1596, was rebuilt in the 17th century in the Renaissance and later in the Baroque style. Today it houses a secondary vocational school.

The Church of Saints Peter and Paul was first mentioned in 1247. The present appearance of the parish church dates from the 1780s, when it was rebuilt in the late Baroque style. It has a valuable interior, mostly in the Empire style.

The town hall was built in the early 17th century.

== Notable people ==
- Jaroslav Křička (1882–1969), composer and conductor
- Vojtěch Jasný (1925–2019), director and screenwriter
- Vlastimil Bubník (1931–2015), ice hockey player and footballer

== Twin towns – sister cities ==
Kelč is twinned with:

- Ladce, Slovakia
