= Okrouhlo =

- Municipality
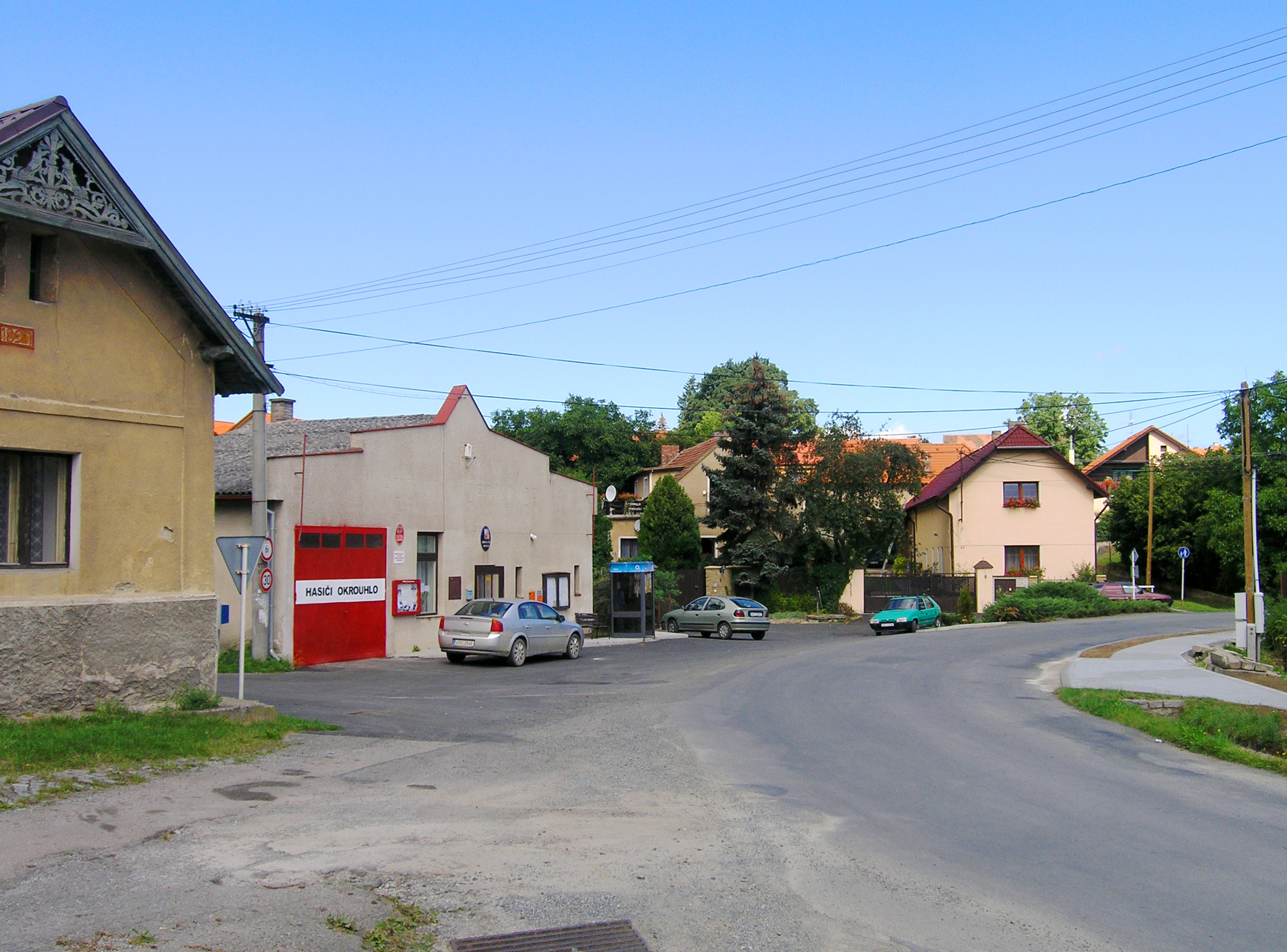
- Centre of Okrouhlo

- Location in the Czech Republic
- Coordinates: 49°55′8″N 14°26′51″E
- Country: Czech Republic
- Region: Central Bohemian
- District: Prague-West
- First mentioned: 1228

Area
  - Total: 8.32 km^{2} (3.21 sq mi)
- Elevation: 333 m (1,093 ft)

Population (2026-01-01)
  - Total: 813
  - Density: 97.7/km^{2} (253/sq mi)
- Time zone: UTC+1 (CET)
  - Summer (DST): UTC+2 (CEST)
- Postal code: 254 01
- Website: www.okrouhlo.cz

Okrouhlo is a municipality and village in Prague-West District in the Central Bohemian Region of the Czech Republic. It has about 800 inhabitants.

== Administrative division ==
Okrouhlo consists of five municipal parts (in brackets population according to the 2021 census):

- Okrouhlo (663)
- Zahořany (168)

== Etymology ==
The name is derived from the Czech word okrouhlý (i.e. 'rounded'). According to one theory, it was the shape of the charcoal piles that were built here. According to another theory, the name was derived from the shaping of the wood used to support the shafts of the nearby gold mines.

== Geography ==
Okrouhlo is located about 10 kilometres (6 mi) south of Prague. It lies in the Prague Plateau. The highest point is at 378 m (1,240 ft) above sea level. The stream Zahořanský potok flows along the eastern and southern municipal border.

== History ==
The first written mention of Okrouhlo is in a deed of the St. George's Convent at Prague Castle from 1228, according to which the village is a property of the Ostrov Monastery in Davle.

== Demographics ==
Historical population

Year	Pop.	±%
1869	432	—
1880	483	+11.8%
1890	536	+11.0%
1900	515	−3.9%
1910	545	+5.8%

Year	Pop.	±%
1921	564	+3.5%
1930	549	−2.7%
1950	461	−16.0%
1961	466	+1.1%
1970	429	−7.9%

Year	Pop.	±%
1980	400	−6.8%
1991	370	−7.5%
2001	470	+27.0%
2011	657	+39.8%
2021	831	+26.5%

Source: Censuses

== Transport ==
There are no railways or major roads passing through the municipality.

== Sights ==
The only protected cultural monument in the municipality is a homestead that is a valuable example of the original village architecture.
