= Zahořany (Prague-West District) =

- Municipality
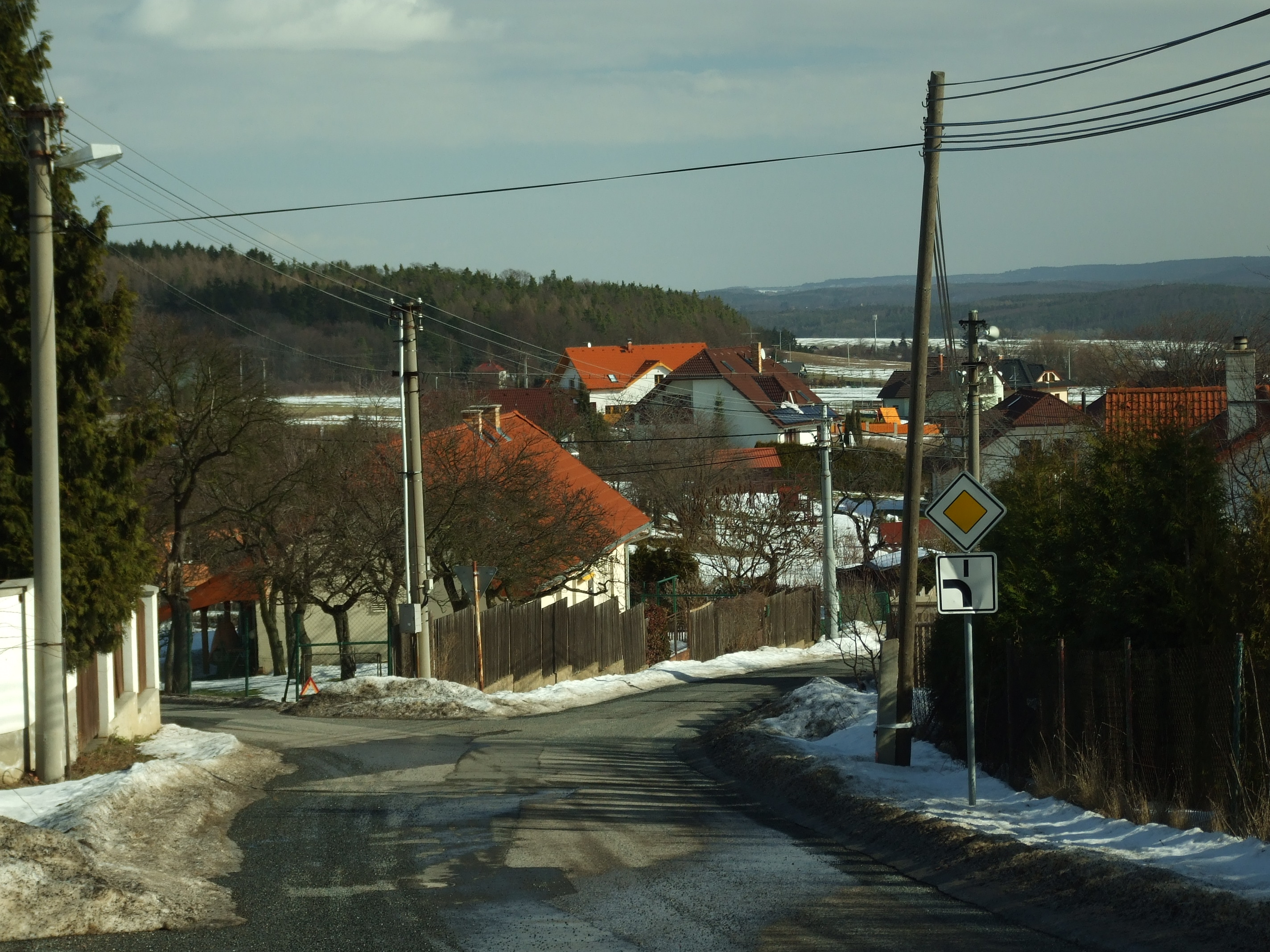
- Houses in Zahořany

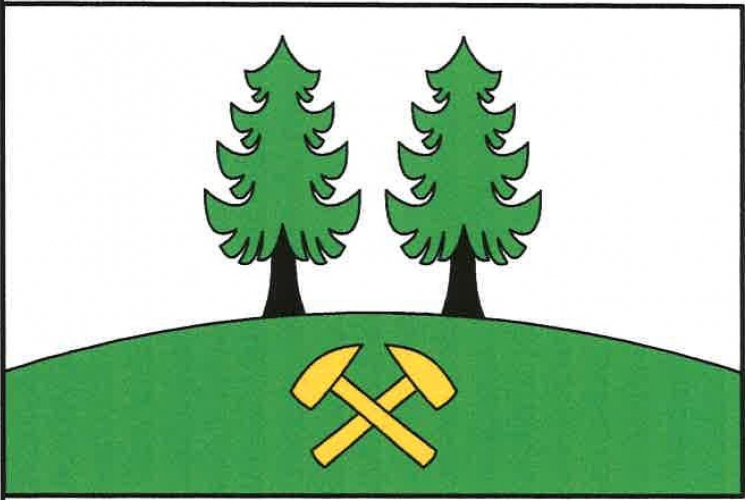
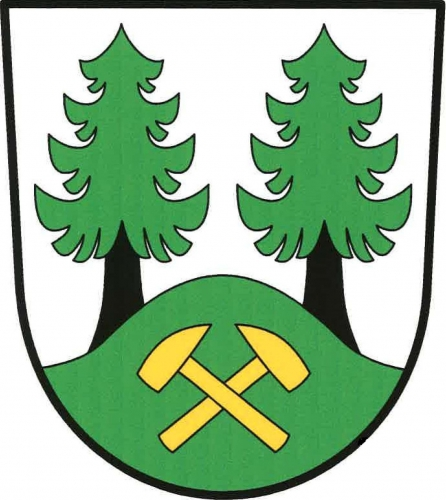
- Flag Coat of arms

- Location in the Czech Republic
- Coordinates: 49°50′58″N 14°17′43″E
- Country: Czech Republic
- Region: Central Bohemian
- District: Prague-West
- First mentioned: 1348

Area
  - Total: 2.72 km^{2} (1.05 sq mi)
- Elevation: 385 m (1,263 ft)

Population (2026-01-01)
  - Total: 363
  - Density: 133/km^{2} (346/sq mi)
- Time zone: UTC+1 (CET)
  - Summer (DST): UTC+2 (CEST)
- Postal code: 252 10
- Website: www.zahorany.cz

Zahořany is a municipality and village in Prague-West District in the Central Bohemian Region of the Czech Republic. It has about 400 inhabitants.

== Demographics ==
Historical population
Year	Pop.	±%
1869	277	—
1880	313	+13.0%
1890	278	−11.2%
1900	264	−5.0%
1910	253	−4.2%
1921	235	−7.1%
1930	207	−11.9%
1950	243	+17.4%
1961	220	−9.5%
1970	201	−8.6%
1980	149	−25.9%
1991	106	−28.9%
2001	165	+55.7%
2011	257	+55.8%
2021	344	+33.9%
Source: Censuses
