= Zahořany (Domažlice District) =

- Municipality
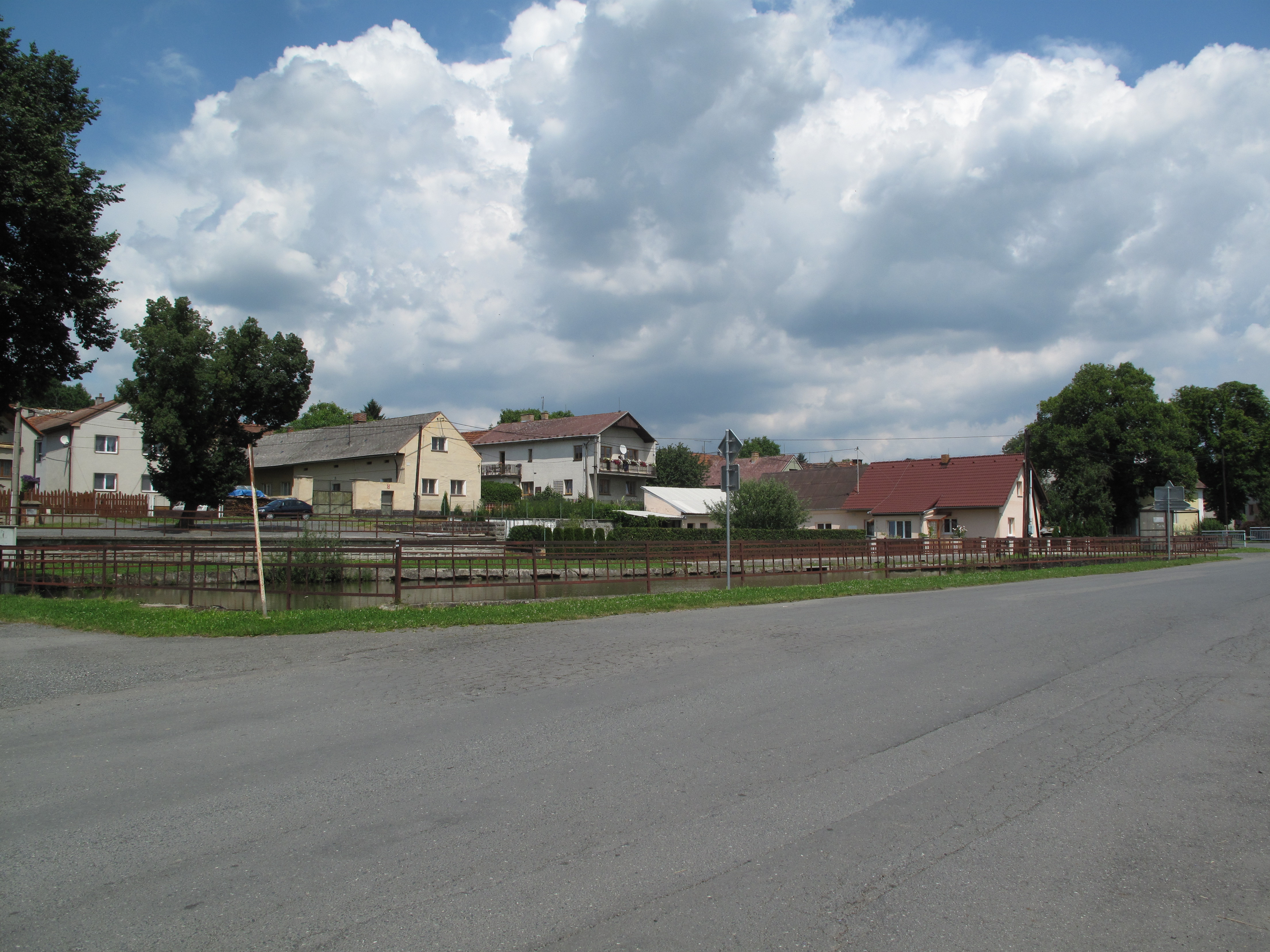
- Common in Zahořany

- Location in the Czech Republic
- Coordinates: 49°25′56″N 12°59′53″E
- Country: Czech Republic
- Region: Plzeň
- District: Domažlice
- First mentioned: 1239

Area
  - Total: 21.17 km^{2} (8.17 sq mi)
- Elevation: 408 m (1,339 ft)

Population (2026-01-01)
  - Total: 1,070
  - Density: 50.5/km^{2} (131/sq mi)
- Time zone: UTC+1 (CET)
  - Summer (DST): UTC+2 (CEST)
- Postal codes: 344 01, 345 06, 345 43
- Website: www.obeczahorany.cz

Zahořany is a municipality and village in the Domažlice District in the Plzeň Region of the Czech Republic. It has about 1,100 inhabitants.

Zahořany lies approximately 6 kilometres (4 mi) east of Domažlice, 45 km (28 mi) south-west of Plzeň, and 126 km (78 mi) south-west of Prague.

== Administrative division ==
Zahořany consists of six municipal parts (in brackets population according to the 2021 census):

- Zahořany (421)
- Bořice (180)
- Hříchovice (76)
- Oprechtice (151)
- Sedlice (65)
- Stanětice (131)

== Demographics ==
Historical population
Year	Pop.	±%
1869	1,855	—
1880	1,911	+3.0%
1890	1,806	−5.5%
1900	1,807	+0.1%
1910	1,895	+4.9%
1921	1,881	−0.7%
1930	1,830	−2.7%
1950	1,304	−28.7%
1961	1,263	−3.1%
1970	1,050	−16.9%
1980	898	−14.5%
1991	911	+1.4%
2001	918	+0.8%
2011	961	+4.7%
2021	1,024	+6.6%
Source: Censuses
